= List of townlands of County Wexford =

This is a sortable table of the approximately 2,384 townlands in County Wexford, Ireland.

Duplicate names occur where there is more than one townland with the same name in the county. Names marked in bold typeface are towns and villages, and the word Town appears for those entries in the Acres column.

== Townland list ==
Townland	Acres	Barony	Civil parish	Poor law union
Abbeydown	454	Scarawalsh	Moyacomb	Shillelagh
Ablintown	95	Forth	Kildavin	Wexford
Aclamon	477	Shelburne	Tellarought	New Ross
Adamstown	1,076	Bantry	Adamstown	New Ross
Ahare	267	Gorey	Kilgorman	Gorey
Ahare	53	Gorey	Kilcavan	Gorey
Aldridge	96	Shelburne	Templetown	New Ross
Allenstown Big	176	Forth	St. Iberius	Wexford
Allenstown Little	64	Forth	St. Iberius	Wexford
Ambrosetown	277	Bargy	Ambrosetown	Wexford
Anagh More	295	Gorey	Kilnahue	Gorey
Annagh	289	Gorey	Monamolin	Gorey
Annagh Central	340	Gorey	Kilnahue	Gorey
Annagh Hill	303	Gorey	Kilnahue	Gorey
Annagh Long	303	Gorey	Kilnahue	Gorey
Annagh Lower	295	Gorey	Kilnahue	Gorey
Annagh Middle	270	Gorey	Kilnahue	Gorey
Annagh Upper	239	Gorey	Kilnahue	Gorey
Annaghfin	53	Ballaghkeen	Ballyhuskard	Enniscorthy
Annaghgap	379	Gorey	Kilnahue	Gorey
Ardcandrisk	83	Shelmaliere West	Ardcandrisk	Wexford
Ardcavan	308	Shelmaliere East	Ardcavan	Wexford
Ardcolm	131	Shelmaliere East	Ardcolm	Wexford
Ardenagh Great	277	Shelmaliere West	Taghmon	Wexford
Ardenagh Little	277	Shelmaliere West	Taghmon	Wexford
Ardross	5	Bantry	St. Mary's	New Ross
Arklow	128	Shelburne	Clonmines	New Ross
Arnestown	614	Bantry	St. Mary's	New Ross
Arnestown	294	Shelmaliere West	Ballingly	Wexford
Arpinstown	8	Bargy	Kilmannan	Wexford
Arragorteen	216	Ballaghkeen	Killenagh	Gorey
**Arthurstown**	Town	Shelburne	St. James & Dunbrody	New Ross
Artramon	543	Shelmaliere East	Artramon	Wexford
Ashwood Lower	183	Gorey	Kilgorman	Gorey
Ashwood Upper	167	Gorey	Kilgorman	Gorey
Ask	398	Gorey	Kilcavan	Gorey
Aska Beg	358	Scarawalsh	Carnew	Gorey
Aska More	807	Scarawalsh	Carnew	Gorey
Askabeg	151	Ballaghkeen	Castle-ellis	Enniscorthy
Askaheige	14	Scarawalsh	Moyacomb	Shillelagh
Askakeel	82	Gorey	Kilnahue	Gorey
Askasilla	299	Ballaghkeen	Castle-ellis	Enniscorthy
Askinamoe	320	Scarawalsh	Ferns	Enniscorthy
Askinch Lower	161	Gorey	Inch	Gorey
Askinch Upper	240	Gorey	Inch	Gorey
Askinfarney	199	Bantry	Templeludigan	New Ross
Askinfarney	121	Bantry	Rossdroit	Enniscorthy
Askingarran Lower	122	Ballaghkeen	Donaghmore	Gorey
Askingarran Upper	192	Ballaghkeen	Donaghmore	Gorey
Askinvillar Lower	309	Bantry	Killann	Enniscorthy
Askinvillar Upper	632	Bantry	Killann	Enniscorthy
Askunshin	250	Scarawalsh	Monart	Enniscorthy
Assagart	588	Shelmaliere West	Kilgarvan	New Ross
Assaly Great	110	Forth	Killinick	Wexford
Assaly Little	99	Forth	Killinick	Wexford
Aughathlappa	355	Scarawalsh	Monart	Enniscorthy
Aughclare	508	Shelburne	Ballybrazil	New Ross
Aughermon	326	Shelmaliere West	Taghmon	Wexford
Aughfad	435	Shelmaliere West	Coolstuff	Wexford
Aughmore	111	Ballaghkeen	Killisk	Enniscorthy
Aughmore	39	Forth	St. Iberius	Wexford
Aughnagalley	170	Ballaghkeen	Templeshannon	Enniscorthy
Aughnagan	138	Shelmaliere West	Coolstuff	Wexford
Aughnamaulmeen	219	Gorey	Kilnahue	Gorey
Aughullen	242	Gorey	Kilnenor	Gorey
Bachelorshall	48	Forth	Rathaspick	Wexford
Balcarrig	318	Gorey	Ballycanew	Gorey
Balcarrighill	109	Gorey	Ballycanew	Gorey
**Baldwinstown**	Town	Bargy	Kilcowan	Wexford
Baldwinstown	205	Bargy	Kilcowan	Wexford
Ballagh	705	Bantry	Adamstown	New Ross
Ballagh	69	Bargy	Tomhaggard	Wexford
Ballagh Burrow	38	Bargy	Tomhaggard	Wexford
Ballaghablake	206	Shelmaliere East	St. Margaret's	Wexford
Ballaghboy	243	Gorey	Liskinfere	Gorey
**Ballaghkeen**	Town	Ballaghkeen	Ballyhuskard	Enniscorthy
Ballaman	645	Scarawalsh	Kilrush	Enniscorthy
Ballare	84	Forth	St. Margaret's	Wexford
Ballask	172	Bargy	Kilturk	Wexford
Ballask	68	Forth	Carn	Wexford
Ballina	237	Shelmaliere East	Ardcolm	Wexford
Ballina	112	Shelmaliere East	Skreen	Wexford
Ballina	19	Ballaghkeen	Castle-ellis	Enniscorthy
Ballina Lower	342	Ballaghkeen	Kilmallock	Enniscorthy
Ballina Lower	96	Ballaghkeen	Ballyvalloo	Enniscorthy
Ballina Upper	302	Ballaghkeen	Ballyvalloo	Enniscorthy
Ballina Upper	214	Ballaghkeen	Kilmallock	Enniscorthy
Ballina Upper	20	Ballaghkeen	Castle-ellis	Enniscorthy
Ballinacarrig	234	Ballaghkeen	Kiltennell	Gorey
Ballinacoola	399	Gorey	Kilnahue	Gorey
Ballinacoola	201	Scarawalsh	Templeshanbo	Enniscorthy
Ballinacoola Beg	81	Shelmaliere East	Ardcolm	Wexford
Ballinacoola More	140	Shelmaliere East	Ardcolm	Wexford
Ballinacrane	119	Gorey	Kiltrisk	Gorey
Ballinacur	253	Ballaghkeen	Ardamine	Gorey
Ballinacur	201	Gorey	Liskinfere	Gorey
Ballinadrummin	229	Gorey	Monamolin	Gorey
Ballinagam Lower	191	Ballaghkeen	Donaghmore	Gorey
Ballinagam Upper	158	Ballaghkeen	Donaghmore	Gorey
Ballinageeloge	170	Ballaghkeen	Ardamine	Gorey
Ballinagrann Lower	211	Ballaghkeen	Ardamine	Gorey
Ballinagrann Upper	259	Ballaghkeen	Ardamine	Gorey
Ballinahorna	153	Ballaghkeen	Killenagh	Gorey
Ballinakill	215	Ballaghkeen	Ardamine	Gorey
Ballinakill	96	Gorey	Ballycanew	Gorey
Ballinamona	327	Gorey	Toome	Gorey
Ballinamona	279	Gorey	Ballycanew	Gorey
Ballinamorragh	155	Shelmaliere East	Ardcolm	Wexford
Ballinapark	308	Scarawalsh	Kilrush	Enniscorthy
Ballinasilloge	82	Gorey	Monamolin	Gorey
Ballinastraw Lower	362	Gorey	Monamolin	Gorey
Ballinastraw Upper	340	Gorey	Monamolin	Gorey
Ballinastudd	204	Gorey	Kiltrisk	Gorey
Ballinatray Lower	257	Ballaghkeen	Ardamine	Gorey
Ballinatray Upper	138	Ballaghkeen	Ardamine	Gorey
Ballinavary	680	Bantry	Clonmore	Enniscorthy
Ballincash Lower	302	Ballaghkeen	Kilcormick	Enniscorthy
Ballincash Upper	486	Ballaghkeen	Kilcormick	Enniscorthy
Ballinclare	402	Gorey	Toome	Gorey
Ballinclare	241	Gorey	Ballycanew	Gorey
Ballinclay	137	Gorey	Liskinfere	Gorey
Ballinclay Lower	212	Bantry	Whitechurchglynn	Wexford
Ballinclay Upper	291	Bantry	Whitechurchglynn	Wexford
Ballindaggan	431	Scarawalsh	Templeshanbo	Enniscorthy
Ballindinas	265	Shelmaliere West	Carrick	Wexford
Ballindoney	1,143	Bantry	Templeludigan	New Ross
Ballinesker	142	Ballaghkeen	St. Margaret's	Wexford
Ballingale	358	Scarawalsh	Ballycarney	Enniscorthy
Ballingarry Lower	239	Gorey	Kilnahue	Gorey
Ballingarry Upper	316	Gorey	Kilnahue	Gorey
Ballingarry Wood	77	Gorey	Kilnahue	Gorey
Ballinglin	181	Gorey	Kilcavan	Gorey
Ballinglinbeg	99	Gorey	Kilcavan	Gorey
Ballingly	470	Shelmaliere West	Ballingly	Wexford
Ballingowan	228	Ballaghkeen	Ballyvaldon	Enniscorthy
Ballingowan	86	Ballaghkeen	Meelnagh	Enniscorthy
Balliniry	254	Shelburne	Fethard	New Ross
Ballinkeel	377	Ballaghkeen	Kilmallock	Enniscorthy
Ballinlow	205	Ballaghkeen	Kilmuckridge	Gorey
Ballinlug East	511	Bantry	Killann	Enniscorthy
Ballinlug West	233	Bantry	Killann	Enniscorthy
Ballinoulart	407	Ballaghkeen	Donaghmore	Gorey
Ballinphile	149	Shelburne	Templetown	New Ross
Ballinra	179	Ballaghkeen	Castle-ellis	Enniscorthy
Ballinra	100	Ballaghkeen	Ballyvalloo	Enniscorthy
Ballinra	25	Ballaghkeen	Skreen	Wexford
Ballinree	226	Gorey	Toome	Gorey
Ballinroad	427	Ballaghkeen	Kilcormick	Enniscorthy
Ballinrooaun	353	Ballaghkeen	Ballyvalloo	Enniscorthy
Ballinrooaun	227	Ballaghkeen	Skreen	Wexford
Ballinruan	232	Shelburne	Templetown	New Ross
Ballinruane	477	Shelburne	Tintern	New Ross
Ballintaggart	148	Ballaghkeen	Killisk	Enniscorthy
Ballintarton	104	Shelmaliere West	Coolstuff	Wexford
Ballinteskin	352	Shelburne	Whitechurch	New Ross
Ballintim	178	Gorey	Toome	Gorey
Ballintlea	237	Gorey	Kilnahue	Gorey
Ballintlea	145	Shelmaliere West	Coolstuff	Wexford
Ballintlea	134	Shelmaliere West	Taghmon	Wexford
Ballintober	385	Bantry	Ballyanne	New Ross
Ballintore	287	Scarawalsh	Kilbride	Enniscorthy
Ballintubbrid	179	Ballaghkeen	Ballyvaldon	Enniscorthy
Ballinturner (or Mountfin Lower)	437	Scarawalsh	Ballycarney	Enniscorthy
Ballinure	284	Scarawalsh	Monart	Enniscorthy
Ballinvack	116	Ballaghkeen	Kilnamanagh	Gorey
Ballinvally	277	Gorey	Monamolin	Gorey
Ballinvally	61	Ballaghkeen	Kilnamanagh	Gorey
Ballinvegga	521	Bantry	Ballyanne	New Ross
Ballinvunnia	91	Ballaghkeen	Donaghmore	Gorey
Ballinvunnia	41	Ballaghkeen	Kiltrisk	Gorey
Balloughter	246	Gorey	Toome	Gorey
Balloughton	420	Bargy	Kilcavan	Wexford
Ballowen (or Ramsfortpark)	324	Gorey	Kilmakilloge	Gorey
Ballyadam	430	Ballaghkeen	Kilmuckridge	Gorey
Ballyaddragh	85	Forth	Kilrane	Wexford
Ballyandrew	389	Scarawalsh	Ferns	Enniscorthy
Ballyandrew	191	Scarawalsh	Kilrush	Enniscorthy
Ballyanne	714	Bantry	Ballyanne	New Ross
Ballyart	382	Gorey	Kiltrisk	Gorey
Ballybanoge	289	Gorey	Toome	Gorey
Ballybanoge	285	Ballaghkeen	Edermine	Enniscorthy
Ballybaun	457	Bantry	Templeludigan	New Ross
Ballybaun	168	Ballaghkeen	Killisk	Enniscorthy
Ballybeg	1,970	Scarawalsh	Ferns	Gorey
Ballybeg	155	Forth	Ballymore	Wexford
Ballybeg	101	Bantry	Whitechurchglynn	Wexford
Ballybeg	87	Ballaghkeen	Ballyhuskard	Enniscorthy
Ballybeg Great	226	Ballaghkeen	Killisk	Enniscorthy
Ballybeg Small	199	Ballaghkeen	Killisk	Enniscorthy
Ballybing	37	Forth	Kilscoran	Wexford
Ballyboggan	202	Shelmaliere West	Carrick	Wexford
Ballyboggan Lower	395	Shelmaliere East	Tikillin	Wexford
Ballyboggan Upper	218	Shelmaliere East	Tikillin	Wexford
Ballyboher	59	Forth	Ballymore	Wexford
Ballyboher	45	Forth	Ishartmon	Wexford
Ballyboro	204	Bantry	Killegney	Enniscorthy
Ballybought	136	Bargy	Kilmore	Wexford
Ballyboy	506	Scarawalsh	Ballycarney	Enniscorthy
Ballyboy	148	Forth	Ballymore	Wexford
Ballybrack	232	Shelmaliere West	Clongeen	New Ross
Ballybracken	97	Ballaghkeen	Ardamine	Gorey
Ballybrannis	149	Scarawalsh	Monart	Enniscorthy
Ballybrazil	386	Shelburne	Ballybrazil	New Ross
Ballybreen	365	Scarawalsh	Templeshanbo	Enniscorthy
Ballybregagh	268	Ballaghkeen	Castle-ellis	Enniscorthy
Ballybrennan	997	Bantry	Kilcowanmore	Enniscorthy
Ballybrennan Big	160	Forth	Ballybrennan	Wexford
Ballybrennan Little	143	Forth	Ballybrennan	Wexford
Ballybrittas	382	Bantry	Kilcowanmore	Enniscorthy
Ballybrittas	2	Bantry	Clonmore	Enniscorthy
Ballybro	105	Forth	Rosslare	Wexford
Ballybuckley	227	Bantry	Clonmore	Enniscorthy
Ballycadden Lower	162	Scarawalsh	Kilrush	Enniscorthy
Ballycadden Upper	225	Scarawalsh	Kilrush	Enniscorthy
**Ballycanew**	Town	Gorey	Ballycanew	Gorey
Ballycanew	366	Gorey	Ballycanew	Gorey
Ballycappoge	293	Bargy	Mulrankin	Wexford
Ballycarney	739	Scarawalsh	Ballycarney	Enniscorthy
Ballycarran	94	Forth	Ballybrennan	Wexford
Ballycarrigeen Lower	376	Gorey	Kilcormick	Enniscorthy
Ballycarrigeen Upper	242	Gorey	Kilcormick	Enniscorthy
Ballycleary	224	Bargy	Kilturk	Wexford
Ballyclemock	1,340	Shelmaliere West	Newbawn	New Ross
Ballyclogh	139	Gorey	Toome	Gorey
Ballycogly	226	Forth	Mayglass	Wexford
Ballycomclone	337	Ballaghkeen	Kiltennell	Gorey
Ballyconlore	173	Gorey	Kilcavan	Gorey
Ballyconlore	151	Gorey	Inch	Gorey
Ballyconlore	98	Gorey	Kilnenor	Gorey
Ballyconnick	206	Bargy	Ballyconnick	Wexford
Ballyconnigar Lower	469	Ballaghkeen	Ballyvaldon	Enniscorthy
Ballyconnigar Upper	320	Ballaghkeen	Ballyvaldon	Enniscorthy
Ballyconor Big	74	Forth	Kilrane	Wexford
Ballyconor Little	79	Forth	Kilrane	Wexford
Ballyconran	459	Scarawalsh	Carnew	Gorey
Ballycorboys Big	97	Forth	Killinick	Wexford
Ballycorboys Little	41	Forth	Killinick	Wexford
Ballycourcy Beg	281	Ballaghkeen	Ballyhuskard	Enniscorthy
Ballycourcy More	445	Ballaghkeen	Ballyhuskard	Enniscorthy
Ballycowan	118	Forth	Kilscoran	Wexford
Ballycrane	175	Shelmaliere East	Ardcolm	Wexford
Ballycronigan	103	Forth	Kilrane	Wexford
Ballycronigan	84	Forth	St. Helen's	Wexford
Ballycross	273	Bargy	Kilmore	Wexford
Ballycrystal	1,779	Scarawalsh	Templeshanbo	Enniscorthy
Ballycullane	544	Shelburne	Tintern	New Ross
Ballycushlane Big	72	Forth	Ladysisland	Wexford
Ballycushlane Little	83	Forth	Ladysisland	Wexford
Ballydane	142	Ballaghkeen	Ardamine	Gorey
Ballydaniel	351	Gorey	Toome	Gorey
Ballydarragh	511	Gorey	Kilnahue	Gorey
Ballydaw (or Davidstown)	328	Scarawalsh	Monart	Enniscorthy
Ballydawmore	187	Scarawalsh	Clone	Enniscorthy
Ballydawmore	49	Scarawalsh	Templeshannon	Enniscorthy
Ballyday	164	Gorey	Kilpipe	Gorey
Ballydermot	74	Gorey	Kilcavan	Gorey
Ballydicken Lower	54	Shelmaliere East	Tikillin	Wexford
Ballydicken Upper	156	Shelmaliere East	Tikillin	Wexford
Ballydonfin	383	Ballaghkeen	Ballyhuskard	Enniscorthy
Ballydonigan	271	Scarawalsh	Clone	Enniscorthy
Ballydoyle	95	Forth	Mayglass	Wexford
Ballydrane	57	Forth	Rosslare	Wexford
Ballyduboy	210	Ballaghkeen	Killincooly	Gorey
Ballyduff	711	Scarawalsh	Kilcomb	Gorey
Ballyduff	332	Scarawalsh	Ballycarney	Enniscorthy
Ballyduff	182	Gorey	Ballycanew	Gorey
Ballyduff	90	Gorey	Monamolin	Gorey
Ballyduff	87	Ballaghkeen	Meelnagh	Gorey
Ballyduff Lower	173	Ballaghkeen	Ardamine	Gorey
Ballyduff Upper	223	Ballaghkeen	Ardamine	Gorey
Ballyduffbeg	247	Gorey	Toome	Gorey
Ballyduffbeg	87	Ballaghkeen	Kilnamanagh	Gorey
Ballydungan	106	Forth	Kilscoran	Wexford
Ballydusker	89	Forth	Killinick	Wexford
Ballyeaton	115	Shelmaliere West	Ardcandrisk	Wexford
Ballyeden	766	Bantry	Rossdroit	Enniscorthy
Ballyeden	149	Gorey	Toome	Gorey
Ballyedmond	143	Ballaghkeen	Monamolin	Gorey
Ballyedmond	41	Ballaghkeen	Kilnamanagh	Gorey
Ballyedock	214	Shelburne	Kilmokea	New Ross
Ballyeland	491	Bantry	Clonmore	Enniscorthy
Ballyell Big	128	Forth	Kilscoran	Wexford
Ballyell Little	66	Forth	Kilscoran	Wexford
Ballyellin	115	Gorey	Kilgorman	Gorey
Ballyellin Lower	100	Gorey	Inch	Gorey
Ballyellin Upper	120	Gorey	Inch	Gorey
Ballyellis	84	Scarawalsh	Carnew	Gorey
Ballyfad	214	Gorey	Kilnenor	Gorey
Ballyfad	145	Gorey	Inch	Gorey
Ballyfane	85	Forth	Carn	Wexford
Ballyfarnoge	264	Shelburne	Whitechurch	New Ross
Ballyfarnoge	226	Ballaghkeen	Killisk	Enniscorthy
Ballyfarnoge	58	Shelburne	Ballybrazil	New Ross
Ballyfin	132	Gorey	Ballycanew	Gorey
Ballyfinoge Great	230	Forth	Kilmacree	Wexford
Ballyfinoge Little	155	Forth	Kilmacree	Wexford
Ballyfoley	287	Scarawalsh	Kilbride	Enniscorthy
Ballyfoley	133	Scarawalsh	Kilbride	Enniscorthy
Ballyfrory	260	Bargy	Bannow	Wexford
Ballygalvert	1,200	Bantry	Clonleigh	New Ross
Ballygarra	58	Forth	Carn	Wexford
Ballygarran	221	Ballaghkeen	Kilmuckridge	Gorey
Ballygarrett	284	Gorey	Kilnahue	Gorey
Ballygarrett	167	Shelburne	Tintern	New Ross
Ballygarrett	161	Ballaghkeen	Donaghmore	Gorey
Ballygarrett	43	Shelburne	Fethard	New Ross
Ballygarrett Little	91	Ballaghkeen	Donaghmore	Gorey
Ballygarvan	681	Shelburne	Owenduff	New Ross
Ballygarvey	180	Forth	Kilscoran	Wexford
Ballygerry	139	Forth	Kilrane	Wexford
Ballygibbon	213	Bantry	Templeludigan	New Ross
Ballygillane Big	158	Forth	Kilrane	Wexford
Ballygillane Little	128	Forth	Kilrane	Wexford
Ballygillistown	315	Bantry	Rossdroit	Enniscorthy
Ballygoman	320	Shelmaliere West	Carrick	Wexford
Ballygortin	182	Ballaghkeen	Killincooly	Gorey
Ballygow	327	Bargy	Bannow	Wexford
Ballygow	291	Shelburne	St. James & Dunbrody	New Ross
Ballygowny	161	Shelburne	Tintern	New Ross
Ballygrangans	270	Bargy	Kilmore	Wexford
Ballygullen	378	Gorey	Kilnahue	Gorey
Ballygullen	171	Gorey	Liskinfere	Gorey
Ballygullick	106	Forth	Ishartmon	Wexford
**Ballyhack**	Town	Shelburne	St. James & Dunbrody	New Ross
Ballyhack	267	Shelburne	St. James & Dunbrody	New Ross
Ballyhackbeg	234	Shelburne	Tintern	New Ross
Ballyhaddock	388	Gorey	Ferns	Enniscorthy
Ballyhamilton	163	Scarawalsh	Templeshanbo	Enniscorthy
Ballyharran Lower	117	Shelmaliere East	Tikillin	Wexford
Ballyharran Upper	156	Shelmaliere East	Tikillin	Wexford
Ballyharty	249	Bargy	Kilmore	Wexford
Ballyhast	337	Gorey	Liskinfere	Gorey
Ballyhealy North	147	Bargy	Kilturk	Wexford
Ballyhealy South	133	Bargy	Kilturk	Wexford
Ballyhealycastle	89	Bargy	Kilturk	Wexford
Ballyheige	248	Ballaghkeen	Skreen	Wexford
Ballyhennigan	166	Shelmaliere West	Taghmon	Wexford
Ballyhigh	89	Ballaghkeen	Meelnagh	Gorey
Ballyhighland	874	Bantry	Rossdroit	Enniscorthy
Ballyhiho	81	Forth	Tacumshin	Wexford
Ballyhine	141	Shelmaliere West	Kilbrideglynn	Wexford
Ballyhire	178	Forth	St. Helen's	Wexford
Ballyhit	38	Shelmaliere West	Kilbrideglynn	Wexford
Ballyhitt	86	Forth	Ladysisland	Wexford
Ballyhoge	1,489	Shelmaliere West	Ballyhoge	Enniscorthy
Ballyhote	82	Forth	Kilrane	Wexford
Ballyhought	23	Ballaghkeen	Castle-ellis	Enniscorthy
Ballyhow Beg	74	Shelmaliere East	Skreen	Wexford
Ballyhow Lower	110	Shelmaliere East	Skreen	Wexford
Ballyhow Middle	151	Shelmaliere East	Skreen	Wexford
Ballyhubbock	156	Ballaghkeen	Kilmuckridge	Gorey
Ballyhubbock	26	Ballaghkeen	Meelnagh	Enniscorthy
Ballyhust	220	Shelmaliere West	Coolstuff	Wexford
Ballykale	268	Ballaghkeen	Kilmakilloge	Gorey
Ballykeeroge	271	Shelburne	Kilmokea	New Ross
Ballykeerogebeg	422	Shelburne	Kilmokea	New Ross
Ballykeerogemore	759	Shelburne	Ballybrazil	New Ross
Ballykelly	607	Shelburne	Whitechurch	New Ross
Ballykelly	370	Ballaghkeen	Kilmallock	Enniscorthy
Ballykelly	152	Forth	Killiane	Wexford
Ballykelly	2	Shelburne	Ballybrazil	New Ross
Ballykelsh	62	Forth	Kilscoran	Wexford
Ballykereen	130	Forth	Ballybrennan	Wexford
Ballykilliane	255	Forth	Killiane	Wexford
Ballykilty Lower	284	Gorey	Inch	Gorey
Ballykilty Upper	165	Gorey	Inch	Gorey
Ballyknock	262	Shelmaliere West	Ballymitty	Wexford
Ballyknockan	272	Ballaghkeen	Castle-ellis	Enniscorthy
Ballyknockan	85	Forth	St. Michael's	Wexford
Ballyknockan	78	Bantry	Rossdroit	Enniscorthy
Ballyknockan	78	Forth	Kilrane	Wexford
Ballyknockan	60	Forth	St. Margaret's	Wexford
Ballyla	91	Shelmaliere East	Ardcolm	Wexford
Ballylacy	204	Gorey	Kilcavan	Gorey
Ballylane East	320	Bantry	Oldross	New Ross
Ballylane West	334	Bantry	Oldross	New Ross
Ballylannan	548	Shelmaliere West	Ballylannan	New Ross
Ballylarkin	203	Gorey	Inch	Gorey
Ballyleigh	1,248	Bantry	St. Mullin's	New Ross
Ballylemin	69	Ballaghkeen	Skreen	Wexford
Ballyliamgow	183	Shelmaliere West	Inch	New Ross
Ballylibernagh	168	Bargy	Mulrankin	Wexford
Ballylough	444	Scarawalsh	Ferns	Enniscorthy
Ballyloughan	74	Gorey	Kilmakilloge	Gorey
Ballyloughlin	120	Gorey	Kilnahue	Gorey
Ballylucas	345	Ballaghkeen	Kilmallock	Enniscorthy
Ballylucas	291	Ballaghkeen	Killisk	Enniscorthy
Ballylurkin	164	Ballaghkeen	Killincooly	Gorey
Ballylusk	274	Gorey	Kilnahue	Gorey
Ballylusk	265	Scarawalsh	Templeshanbo	Enniscorthy
Ballylusk	145	Ballaghkeen	Ardamine	Gorey
Ballymacane	113	Forth	Tacumshin	Wexford
Ballymacar	610	Bantry	Oldross	New Ross
Ballymackesy	516	Bantry	Chapel	Enniscorthy
Ballymacky	76	Gorey	Kilcavan	Gorey
Ballymacky	6	Gorey	Kilgorman	Gorey
Ballymaclare	257	Shelburne	Whitechurch	New Ross
Ballymacoonoge	196	Ballaghkeen	Killisk	Enniscorthy
Ballymacshoneen	17	Shelmaliere East	Tikillin	Wexford
Ballymacshoneen	5	Shelmaliere East	Kilpatrick	Wexford
Ballymacsimon	241	Ballaghkeen	Killincooly	Enniscorthy
Ballymacushin	112	Forth	Kilscoran	Wexford
Ballymacushin	12	Forth	Ballybrennan	Wexford
Ballymadder	215	Bargy	Bannow	Wexford
Ballymartin	91	Shelmaliere East	Ardcavan	Wexford
Ballymaunhill	198	Gorey	Liskinfere	Gorey
Ballymichael	41	Shelmaliere West	Ardcandrisk	Wexford
Ballyminaun	165	Gorey	Liskinfere	Gorey
Ballyminaun Big	114	Forth	Killinick	Wexford
Ballyminaun Little	70	Forth	Killinick	Wexford
Ballymitty	241	Shelmaliere West	Ballymitty	Wexford
Ballymoney Lower	236	Ballaghkeen	Kiltennell	Gorey
Ballymoney Upper	185	Ballaghkeen	Kiltennell	Gorey
Ballymore	451	Scarawalsh	Kilbride	Enniscorthy
Ballymore	231	Ballaghkeen	Skreen	Wexford
Ballymore Demesne	364	Scarawalsh	Kilbride	Enniscorthy
Ballymorgan	122	Scarawalsh	Ballycarney	Enniscorthy
Ballymorris	272	Bantry	Ballyhoge	Enniscorthy
Ballymorris	142	Forth	St. Peter's	Wexford
Ballymoty Beg	302	Ballaghkeen	Ballyhuskard	Enniscorthy
Ballymoty Beg	302	Ballaghkeen	Ballyhuskard	Enniscorthy
Ballymoty More	270	Ballaghkeen	Ballyhuskard	Enniscorthy
Ballymoty More	270	Ballaghkeen	Ballyhuskard	Enniscorthy
Ballymurn Lower	181	Ballaghkeen	Kilmallock	Enniscorthy
Ballymurn Upper	198	Ballaghkeen	Kilmallock	Enniscorthy
Ballymurragh	72	Ballaghkeen	Kilnamanagh	Gorey
Ballymurragh	66	Ballaghkeen	Killincooly	Gorey
Ballymurragh	35	Forth	Kilscoran	Wexford
Ballymurry	207	Ballaghkeen	Ballyhuskard	Enniscorthy
Ballymurry	73	Forth	Tacumshin	Wexford
Ballymurtagh	195	Scarawalsh	Clone	Enniscorthy
Ballynaas Great	103	Forth	Rathmacknee	Wexford
Ballynaas Little	58	Forth	Rathmacknee	Wexford
Ballynabanoge	542	Bantry	Ballyanne	New Ross
Ballynabarney	720	Gorey	Kilpipe	Gorey
Ballynabarny	466	Scarawalsh	Templeshannon	Enniscorthy
Ballynabearna	803	Bantry	St. Mullin's	New Ross
Ballynaberny	532	Scarawalsh	Kilrush	Enniscorthy
Ballynabola	626	Bantry	Kilscanlan	New Ross
Ballynabrigadane	214	Ballaghkeen	Kilmallock	Enniscorthy
Ballynacarrig	283	Shelmaliere East	Kilpatrick	Enniscorthy
Ballynacarrig	102	Shelmaliere East	Ballynaslaney	Enniscorthy
Ballynaclash	171	Ballaghkeen	Ballyvalloo	Enniscorthy
Ballynaclash	102	Ballaghkeen	Killila	Enniscorthy
Ballynacoolagh	371	Bantry	St. Mullin's	New Ross
Ballynacree	173	Gorey	Kilgorman	Gorey
Ballynadrishoge	158	Ballaghkeen	Ballyvaldon	Enniscorthy
Ballynagale	265	Bargy	Taghmon	Wexford
Ballynagee	95	Forth	St. Peter's	Wexford
Ballynaglogh	194	Bargy	Ballyconnick	Wexford
Ballynaglogh	143	Shelmaliere West	Ardcandrisk	Wexford
Ballynaglogh	68	Ballaghkeen	Killila	Enniscorthy
Ballynaglogh	67	Ballaghkeen	Ballyvaldon	Enniscorthy
Ballynagore	191	Ballaghkeen	Killila	Enniscorthy
Ballynagore	106	Ballaghkeen	Castle-ellis	Enniscorthy
Ballynagrallagh	414	Bantry	Newbawn	New Ross
Ballynahallin	358	Scarawalsh	St. Mary's, Enniscorthy	Enniscorthy
Ballynahask	210	Ballaghkeen	Killincooly	Enniscorthy
Ballynahask	30	Ballaghkeen	Meelnagh	Enniscorthy
Ballynahask	29	Ballaghkeen	Ballyvaldon	Enniscorthy
Ballynahillen	284	Gorey	Liskinfere	Gorey
Ballynahown	172	Ballaghkeen	Kilnamanagh	Gorey
Ballynahown	145	Ballaghkeen	Killincooly	Gorey
Ballynakill	824	Scarawalsh	Monart	Enniscorthy
Ballynakill	351	Scarawalsh	Kilbride	Enniscorthy
Ballynaleck	26	Shelmaliere East	Artramon	Wexford
Ballynaminnan	364	Scarawalsh	Templeshanbo	Enniscorthy
Ballynamire	53	Ballaghkeen	Kilnamanagh	Gorey
Ballynamona	459	Shelburne	Kilmokea	New Ross
Ballynamona	346	Shelmaliere West	Clongeen	New Ross
Ballynamona	243	Ballaghkeen	Castle-ellis	Enniscorthy
Ballynamona	200	Ballaghkeen	Killincooly	Enniscorthy
Ballynamona	87	Ballaghkeen	Ballyvaldon	Enniscorthy
Ballynamonabeg	155	Ballaghkeen	Killisk	Enniscorthy
Ballynamonabeg	29	Ballaghkeen	Castle-ellis	Enniscorthy
Ballynamony	171	Gorey	Ballycanew	Gorey
**Ballynamuddagh**	Town	Ballaghkeen	Ballyhuskard	Enniscorthy
Ballynamuddagh	450	Ballaghkeen	Ballyhuskard	Enniscorthy
Ballynancoran	370	Scarawalsh	Carnew	Gorey
Ballynapierce	385	Bantry	St. John's	Enniscorthy
Ballynaslaney	355	Shelmaliere East	Ballynaslaney	Enniscorthy
Ballynaslaney	7	Shelmaliere East	Kilpatrick	Enniscorthy
Ballynastraw	795	Scarawalsh	Moyacomb	Shillelagh
Ballynastraw	750	Ballaghkeen	Ballyhuskard	Enniscorthy
Ballynelahill	331	Scarawalsh	Monart	Enniscorthy
Ballynellard	390	Ballaghkeen	Castle-ellis	Enniscorthy
Ballynellard	50	Ballaghkeen	Killila	Enniscorthy
Ballynestragh	166	Gorey	Kilcavan	Gorey
Ballynestragh Demesne	401	Gorey	Kilcavan	Gorey
Ballynure	175	Ballaghkeen	Kilmuckridge	Gorey
Ballyorley Lower	275	Gorey	Kilcormick	Enniscorthy
Ballyorley Upper	309	Gorey	Kilcormick	Enniscorthy
Ballyorril	568	Scarawalsh	Monart	Enniscorthy
Ballyoughna	380	Gorey	Kiltrisk	Gorey
Ballyowen	352	Shelmaliere West	Ballylannan	New Ross
Ballyowen	290	Gorey	Kilnahue	Gorey
Ballyphilip	433	Scarawalsh	St. Mary's, Enniscorthy	Enniscorthy
Ballyprecas	943	Scarawalsh	St. Mary's, Enniscorthy	Enniscorthy
Ballyrahan	202	Gorey	Kilnahue	Gorey
Ballyrahin	192	Ballaghkeen	Killincooly	Gorey
Ballyrane	112	Forth	Killinick	Wexford
Ballyrankin	557	Scarawalsh	Kilrush	Enniscorthy
Ballyrannel	343	Ballaghkeen	Ballyhuskard	Enniscorthy
Ballyrea	180	Ballaghkeen	Kilnamanagh	Gorey
Ballyregan	415	Scarawalsh	Kilbride	Enniscorthy
Ballyregan	229	Gorey	Rossminoge	Gorey
Ballyregan	119	Forth	Ballymore	Wexford
Ballyregan (or Fairyhill)	133	Shelmaliere East	Artramon	Wexford
Ballyreilly	116	Forth	Kilrane	Wexford
Ballyroe	199	Ballaghkeen	Edermine	Enniscorthy
Ballyroe (Annesley)	220	Ballaghkeen	Castle-ellis	Enniscorthy
Ballyroe (Nunn)	239	Ballaghkeen	Castle-ellis	Enniscorthy
Ballyroe Lower	162	Bantry	St. Mary's	New Ross
Ballyroe Upper	152	Bantry	St. Mary's	New Ross
Ballyroebeg	106	Ballaghkeen	Castle-ellis	Enniscorthy
Ballyroebuck	574	Scarawalsh	Kilrush	Enniscorthy
Ballyrooaun	83	Ballaghkeen	Ballynaslaney	Enniscorthy
Ballyrory	236	Gorey	Kilpipe	Gorey
Ballysampson	152	Forth	Tacumshin	Wexford
Ballyscartin	314	Ballaghkeen	Kilmakilloge	Gorey
Ballyscough	111	Ballaghkeen	Meelnagh	Gorey
Ballyseskin	226	Bargy	Kilmore	Wexford
Ballyshane	97	Shelmaliere East	Artramon	Wexford
Ballyshane	59	Ballaghkeen	Kilnamanagh	Gorey
Ballyshannon	497	Shelmaliere West	Newbawn	New Ross
Ballyshaun	314	Gorey	Toome	Gorey
Ballysheen	154	Forth	Killinick	Wexford
Ballysheen	130	Forth	Carn	Wexford
Ballyshelin	206	Shelmaliere West	Taghmon	Wexford
Ballyshonock	287	Scarawalsh	Moyacomb	Shillelagh
Ballysilla	335	Ballaghkeen	Kilmallock	Enniscorthy
Ballysillagh	70	Ballaghkeen	Edermine	Enniscorthy
Ballysimon	310	Scarawalsh	Clone	Enniscorthy
Ballysop	353	Shelburne	Ballybrazil	New Ross
Ballystraw	177	Shelburne	Templetown	New Ross
Ballytarsna	505	Scarawalsh	Carnew	Gorey
Ballytarsna	482	Ballaghkeen	Meelnagh	Enniscorthy
Ballytarsna	382	Shelburne	Owenduff	New Ross
Ballytarsna Little	79	Ballaghkeen	Meelnagh	Enniscorthy
Ballytegan	332	Gorey	Kilcavan	Gorey
Ballyteganpark	126	Gorey	Kilcavan	Gorey
Ballyteige	208	Gorey	Ballycanew	Gorey
Ballyteige	169	Bargy	Kilmore	Wexford
Ballyteige	117	Ballaghkeen	Kilmuckridge	Gorey
Ballyteige Burrow	666	Bargy	Kilmore	Wexford
Ballythomas	355	Gorey	Kilpipe	Gorey
Ballythomashill	646	Gorey	Kilpipe	Gorey
Ballytory Lower	147	Forth	Tacumshin	Wexford
Ballytory Upper	141	Forth	Tacumshin	Wexford
Ballytra	89	Forth	Carn	Wexford
Ballytracey	453	Gorey	Kilcormick	Enniscorthy
Ballytramon	336	Shelmaliere East	Ardcavan	Wexford
Ballytrent	107	Forth	Kilrane	Wexford
Ballyvadden	219	Ballaghkeen	Kilmuckridge	Gorey
Ballyvake	340	Ballaghkeen	Edermine	Enniscorthy
Ballyvaldon	467	Ballaghkeen	Ballyvaldon	Enniscorthy
Ballyvalloge	184	Shelmaliere West	Ardcandrisk	Wexford
Ballyvalloo Lower	302	Ballaghkeen	Ballyvalloo	Enniscorthy
Ballyvalloo Upper	421	Ballaghkeen	Ballyvalloo	Enniscorthy
Ballyvaroge	235	Shelburne	Fethard	New Ross
Ballyvelig	425	Shelburne	St. James & Dunbrody	New Ross
Ballyvergin	549	Shelmaliere West	Kilgarvan	New Ross
Ballyverroge	423	Shelburne	Whitechurch	New Ross
Ballyvoodock	283	Ballaghkeen	Ballyvaldon	Enniscorthy
Ballyvoodrane	214	Ballaghkeen	Ballyvaldon	Enniscorthy
Ballywalter	160	Ballaghkeen	Killenagh	Gorey
Ballywalter Beg	249	Ballaghkeen	Killenagh	Gorey
Ballywalter More	319	Ballaghkeen	Killenagh	Gorey
Ballywater	66	Shelmaliere East	Tikillin	Wexford
Ballywater Lower	441	Ballaghkeen	Donaghmore	Gorey
Ballywater Upper	109	Ballaghkeen	Donaghmore	Gorey
Ballywether	211	Shelmaliere West	Kilbrideglynn	Wexford
Ballywilliam	736	Bantry	Templeludigan	New Ross
Ballywilliam	288	Gorey	Kilcavan	Gorey
Ballywilliamroe	232	Scarawalsh	Monart	Enniscorthy
Ballywish	43	Shelmaliere East	Ardcavan	Wexford
Ballywitch	83	Forth	St. Helen's	Wexford
Baltyfarrell	172	Gorey	Kilnahue	Gorey
Bannow	389	Bargy	Bannow	Wexford
Bannow Island	143	Bargy	Bannow	Wexford
Bannow Moor	120	Bargy	Bannow	Wexford
Bannpark	185	Gorey	Rossminoge	Gorey
Banntown	217	Gorey	Liskinfere	Gorey
Banoge	310	Ballaghkeen	Kiltennell	Gorey
Banoge	82	Forth	Ballymore	Wexford
Banogehill	197	Ballaghkeen	Kilmakilloge	Gorey
Bantry Commons	1,640	Bantry	Killann	Enniscorthy
Bantry Commons	1,514	Bantry	Templeludigan	New Ross
Bantry Commons	545	Bantry	St. Mullin's	New Ross
Bargy	62	Bargy	Tomhaggard	Wexford
Bargy Commons	732	Bargy	Kilmannan	Wexford
Barmona	195	Ballaghkeen	Monamolin	Gorey
Barmona	100	Scarawalsh	Clone	Enniscorthy
Barmoney	835	Bantry	Whitechurchglynn	Wexford
Barnadown	311	Gorey	Kilpipe	Gorey
Barnadown Lower	291	Gorey	Liskinfere	Gorey
Barnadown Upper	169	Gorey	Liskinfere	Gorey
Barnahask	159	Shelmaliere East	St. Margaret's	Wexford
Barnaree	81	Gorey	Kiltrisk	Gorey
Barnariddery	142	Ballaghkeen	Ballyvalloo	Enniscorthy
Barnawheel	33	Forth	Carn	Wexford
Barnland	158	Gorey	Kilcavan	Gorey
Barntown	194	Shelmaliere West	Carrick	Wexford
Barrackcroghan	201	Gorey	Kilnenor	Gorey
Barracurragh	265	Gorey	Kilcavan	Gorey
Barraglan	312	Ballaghkeen	Monamolin	Gorey
Barratober (or Farmhill)	131	Shelmaliere East	Artramon	Wexford
Barrettspark	15	Bantry	St. Mary's	New Ross
Barroge	66	Gorey	Kilgorman	Gorey
Barrystown	519	Bargy	Bannow	Wexford
Bastardstown	191	Bargy	Kilmore	Wexford
Battlestown	1,291	Shelburne	St. James & Dunbrody	New Ross
Baurela	122	Ballaghkeen	Ballyhuskard	Enniscorthy
Bawnmore	101	Bantry	St. Mary's	New Ross
Bayland	299	Scarawalsh	Ferns	Enniscorthy
Baylestown	236	Shelburne	Tintern	New Ross
Beak	68	Bargy	Kilmore	Wexford
Bearlough	137	Forth	Rosslare	Wexford
Beaufield	280	Scarawalsh	Moyacomb	Shillelagh
Beckville	30	Bargy	Kilcowan	Wexford
Begerin (Lloyd)	200	Bantry	Oldross	New Ross
Begerin (Loftus)	359	Bantry	Oldross	New Ross
Begerin Island	21	Shelmaliere East	St. Margaret's	Wexford
Bellary	77	Bargy	Duncormick	Wexford
Bellgrove	219	Bargy	Duncormick	Wexford
Bellgrovecross	129	Bargy	Duncormick	Wexford
Bennettsknock	7	Bantry	St. Mary's	New Ross
Bennettstown	115	Forth	Tacumshin	Wexford
Berkeley	374	Bantry	Ballyanne	New Ross
Bessmount	258	Scarawalsh	Monart	Enniscorthy
Big Island	124	Shelmaliere East	St. Margaret's	Wexford
Big Island	28	Bargy	Kilcowan	Wexford
Bigwood	81	Bantry	St. Mullin's	New Ross
Bing	94	Forth	St. Helen's	Wexford
Birdstown	12	Forth	St. Margaret's	Wexford
Bishopland	60	Ballaghkeen	St. Nicholas	Enniscorthy
Bishopsland	44	Bantry	St. Mary's	New Ross
Blackhall	602	Bantry	Whitechurchglynn	Wexford
Blackhall	113	Bargy	Bannow	Wexford
Blackhorse	64	Forth	Drinagh	Wexford
Blackmoor	95	Bargy	Kilmannan	Wexford
Blackstairs Commons	532	Bantry	Killann	Enniscorthy
Blackstone	100	Bargy	Killag	Wexford
Blackstoops	203	Scarawalsh	St. Mary's, Enniscorthy	Enniscorthy
**Blackwater (or Part)**	Town	Ballaghkeen	Ballyvaldon	Enniscorthy
**Blackwater (or Part)**	Town	Ballaghkeen	Killila	Enniscorthy
Blastknock	224	Shelmaliere West	Taghmon	Wexford
Bleachlands	56	Ballaghkeen	Ballynaslaney	Enniscorthy
Bloomfield	158	Bantry	St. John's	Enniscorthy
Bloomhill	96	Forth	Rathmacknee	Wexford
Blunsheens	69	Forth	Ballybrennan	Wexford
Boarmona	94	Scarawalsh	Templeshanbo	Enniscorthy
Boderan	489	Shelburne	Killesk	New Ross
Bog and Warren	97	Ballaghkeen	Donaghmore	Gorey
Bog East	105	Forth	Mayglass	Wexford
Bog West	177	Forth	Mayglass	Wexford
Bogganstown Lower	37	Forth	Drinagh	Wexford
Bogganstown Upper	26	Forth	Drinagh	Wexford
Boher	31	Forth	St. Helen's	Wexford
Bohercreen	1	Forth	Carn	Wexford
Boherstooka	169	Bantry	Ballyanne	New Ross
Boira North	251	Gorey	Kiltrisk	Gorey
Boira South	355	Gorey	Kiltrisk	Gorey
Bola Beg	429	Scarawalsh	Templeshanbo	Enniscorthy
Bola More	288	Scarawalsh	Templeshanbo	Enniscorthy
Bolabaun	278	Shelmaliere West	Killurin	Wexford
Bolaboy Beg	184	Ballaghkeen	Castle-ellis	Enniscorthy
Bolaboy Beg	28	Ballaghkeen	Meelnagh	Enniscorthy
Bolaboy More	369	Ballaghkeen	Meelnagh	Enniscorthy
Bolabradda	160	Gorey	Inch	Gorey
Bolacaheer	308	Scarawalsh	Ferns	Enniscorthy
Bolacaheer	174	Bantry	Ballyanne	New Ross
Bolacreen	336	Scarawalsh	Kilbride	Enniscorthy
Bolacreen	336	Gorey	Kilnahue	Gorey
Boladurragh	727	Scarawalsh	Templeshanbo	Enniscorthy
Bolany	300	Gorey	Kilnahue	Gorey
Boleany	191	Ballaghkeen	Ardamine	Gorey
Boley	1,193	Shelburne	Owenduff	New Ross
Boley	322	Gorey	Ballycanew	Gorey
Boley Lower	225	Gorey	Rossminoge	Gorey
Boley Upper	206	Gorey	Rossminoge	Gorey
Boleybaun	155	Gorey	Kilcavan	Gorey
Bolgerstown	130	Shelmaliere West	Ardcandrisk	Wexford
Bolinahaney	605	Scarawalsh	Kilrush	Enniscorthy
Bolinaspick	237	Scarawalsh	Ferns	Enniscorthy
Bolinready	303	Gorey	Ballycanew	Gorey
Bolinrush	913	Scarawalsh	Carnew	Gorey
Boolabaun	783	Bantry	Rossdroit	Enniscorthy
Booley	227	Shelburne	Templetown	New Ross
Boolnadrum	270	Scarawalsh	Kilrush	Enniscorthy
Boolycreen	34	Scarawalsh	St. Mary's, Newtownbarry	Enniscorthy
Boolynavoughran	375	Scarawalsh	St. Mary's, Newtownbarry	Enniscorthy
Borehovel	104	Ballaghkeen	Killenagh	Gorey
Borleagh	206	Gorey	Kilcavan	Gorey
Borleagh Demesne	188	Gorey	Kilcavan	Gorey
Bornacourtia	89	Ballaghkeen	Killincooly	Enniscorthy
Borris	288	Scarawalsh	Kilrush	Enniscorthy
Borrmount	348	Bantry	Clonmore	Enniscorthy
Bowling Green	8	Bantry	St. Mary's	New Ross
Brackernagh	214	Gorey	Ballycanew	Gorey
Braestown	60	Forth	Mayglass	Wexford
Brandane	242	Bargy	Bannow	Wexford
Breast Island	3	Shelmaliere East	St. Margaret's	Wexford
Breast Island, Little	1	Shelmaliere East	St. Margaret's	Wexford
Bree	498	Bantry	Clonmore	Enniscorthy
Bregorteen	205	Shelmaliere West	Kilbrideglynn	Wexford
Bricketstown	514	Bantry	Whitechurchglynn	Wexford
Brickpark	40	Ballaghkeen	Killenagh	Gorey
Brideswell	170	Bargy	Mulrankin	Wexford
Brideswell Big	637	Scarawalsh	Carnew	Gorey
Brideswell Little	331	Scarawalsh	Carnew	Gorey
**Bridgetown**	Town	Bargy	Mulrankin	Wexford
Bridgetown	41	Bantry	Clonmore	Enniscorthy
Bridgetown North	29	Bargy	Mulrankin	Wexford
Bridgetown South	130	Bargy	Mulrankin	Wexford
Brittas	128	Forth	Kilscoran	Wexford
**Broadway**	Town	Forth	St. Iberius	Wexford
Brocorrow	505	Bantry	Adamstown	New Ross
Brookfield	25	Forth	Rathaspick	Wexford
Broomhill	364	Shelburne	Templetown	New Ross
Brownscastle	224	Shelmaliere West	Taghmon	Wexford
Brownstown	624	Shelmaliere West	Newbawn	New Ross
Brownstown	117	Bargy	Kilcowan	Wexford
Brownswood	519	Ballaghkeen	Templeshannon	Enniscorthy
Bruce	93	Gorey	Kiltrisk	Gorey
Bruce	54	Gorey	Donaghmore	Gorey
Bryanstown	441	Shelmaliere West	Clongeen	New Ross
Buckstown	234	Gorey	Carnew	Gorey
Bulgan	562	Bantry	Whitechurchglynn	Wexford
Bunargate	66	Forth	Tacumshin	Wexford
Bunargate Strand	23	Forth	Tacumshin	Wexford
Bunarge	17	Forth	Carn	Wexford
Buncarrick	90	Forth	Carn	Wexford
Burgess	27	Shelmaliere East	Ardcavan	Wexford
Burkestown	290	Shelburne	Tintern	New Ross
Burrow	246	Scarawalsh	Carnew	Gorey
Burrow	188	Forth	Rosslare	Wexford
Burrow	155	Forth	Carn	Wexford
Burrow	12	Forth	St. Helen's	Wexford
Bush	97	Forth	St. Michael's	Wexford
Bush	20	Forth	Carn	Wexford
Busherstown	254	Bargy	Kilcavan	Wexford
Busherstown	50	Forth	Mayglass	Wexford
Bushpark	229	Bantry	Oldross	New Ross
Butlersland	92	Bantry	St. Mary's	New Ross
Butlerstown	171	Forth	St. Iberius	Wexford
Butlerstown	103	Forth	Ishartmon	Wexford
Butlerstown	44	Forth	Ballymore	Wexford
Cahore	275	Ballaghkeen	Donaghmore	Gorey
Caim	642	Scarawalsh	Monart	Enniscorthy
Cain	128	Gorey	Liskinfere	Gorey
Camaross	1,385	Shelmaliere West	Kilgarvan	New Ross
Camlin	578	Bantry	Oldross	New Ross
**Camolin**	Town	Scarawalsh	Toome	Gorey
Camolin	336	Scarawalsh	Toome	Gorey
Camolin Park	974	Scarawalsh	Kilcomb	Gorey
Camteige	226	Scarawalsh	St. Mary's, Newtownbarry	Enniscorthy
Carna	25	Forth	Carn	Wexford
Carnagh	753	Bantry	Carnagh	New Ross
Carranroe	397	Scarawalsh	Monart	Enniscorthy
Carrhill	222	Scarawalsh	Moyacomb	Enniscorthy
**Carrick**	Town	Bargy	Bannow	Wexford
Carrick	189	Bargy	Bannow	Wexford
Carricklawn	83	Shelmaliere West	Carrick	Wexford
Carrig	437	Gorey	Kilpipe	Gorey
Carrig	189	Bantry	Clonmore	Enniscorthy
Carrigabruse	123	Scarawalsh	Monart	Enniscorthy
Carrigabruse	14	Scarawalsh	St. Mary's, Enniscorthy	Enniscorthy
Carrigadaggan	233	Bantry	Newbawn	New Ross
Carriganeagh	197	Ballaghkeen	Kilmakilloge	Gorey
Carrigbeg	250	Gorey	Rossminoge	Gorey
Carrigbeg	237	Gorey	Kilnahue	Gorey
Carrigeen	219	Gorey	Kilcormick	Enniscorthy
Carriglegan	365	Scarawalsh	Kilcomb	Gorey
Carrigmacoge	27	Bantry	Clonmore	Enniscorthy
Carrigmannon	207	Shelmaliere West	Killurin	Wexford
Carrigunane	159	Bantry	Kilcowanmore	Enniscorthy
Carrowanree	79	Shelburne	Killesk	New Ross
Carrowreagh	219	Shelmaliere West	Kilgarvan	New Ross
Cashel	113	Scarawalsh	St. Mary's, Newtownbarry	Enniscorthy
Castleannesley	266	Ballaghkeen	Kilmuckridge	Gorey
Castleboro Demesne	745	Bantry	Killegney	Enniscorthy
**Castlebridge**	Town	Shelmaliere East	Ardcavan	Wexford
**Castlebridge**	Town	Shelmaliere East	Ardcolm	Wexford
**Castlebridge**	Town	Shelmaliere East	Tikillin	Wexford
Castlebridge	57	Shelmaliere East	Ardcavan	Wexford
Castlebridge	38	Shelmaliere East	Ardcolm	Wexford
Castleellis	130	Ballaghkeen	Castle-ellis	Enniscorthy
Castlehaystown	442	Bantry	Whitechurchglynn	Wexford
Castleland	227	Scarawalsh	Ferns	Enniscorthy
Castleland	133	Gorey	Kilcavan	Gorey
Castlemoyle	42	Bantry	St. Mary's	New Ross
Castlepaliser	30	Forth	Carn	Wexford
Castlequarter	224	Scarawalsh	Kilrush	Enniscorthy
Castlesow	95	Shelmaliere East	Tikillin	Wexford
Castletalbot	183	Ballaghkeen	Killila	Enniscorthy
Castletown	219	Gorey	Kilgorman	Gorey
Castletown	119	Forth	Carn	Wexford
Castletown	92	Bargy	Kilmore	Wexford
Castlewhite	234	Scarawalsh	Carnew	Gorey
Castleworkhouse	224	Shelburne	Tintern	New Ross
Chambersland	68	Bantry	St. Mary's	New Ross
Chapel	743	Bantry	Chapel	Enniscorthy
Chapel	90	Bargy	Kilmore	Wexford
Cherriestown	106	Bargy	Kilmannan	Wexford
Cherryorchard	116	Scarawalsh	Monart	Enniscorthy
Cherryorchard	1	Scarawalsh	St. Mary's, Enniscorthy	Enniscorthy
Chour	39	Forth	Carn	Wexford
Churchlands	116	Forth	Mayglass	Wexford
**Churchtown**	Town	Shelburne	Hook	New Ross
Churchtown	247	Gorey	Liskinfere	Gorey
Churchtown	234	Forth	Kilrane	Wexford
Churchtown	221	Shelburne	Hook	New Ross
Churchtown	191	Forth	Rosslare	Wexford
Churchtown	132	Forth	Carn	Wexford
Churchtown	93	Forth	Tacumshin	Wexford
Churchtown	92	Forth	Ballymore	Wexford
Churchtown	75	Bargy	Mulrankin	Wexford
Churchtown	62	Forth	Rathaspick	Wexford
Clasheen	126	Gorey	Monamolin	Gorey
Clavass	157	Scarawalsh	St. Mary's, Enniscorthy	Enniscorthy
Cleristown North	241	Bargy	Kilmannan	Wexford
Cleristown South	393	Bargy	Kilmannan	Wexford
Clobemon	222	Scarawalsh	Ballycarney	Enniscorthy
Clogh	301	Gorey	Liskinfere	Gorey
Cloghnamallaght	189	Gorey	Monamolin	Gorey
Cloghulatagh	273	Shelmaliere West	Taghmon	Wexford
**Clohamon**	Town	Scarawalsh	Kilrush	Enniscorthy
Clohamon	350	Scarawalsh	Kilrush	Enniscorthy
Clohass	266	Bantry	Templescoby	Enniscorthy
Cloheden	264	Bantry	Rossdroit	Enniscorthy
Clologe	250	Scarawalsh	Toome	Gorey
Clologe Little	96	Scarawalsh	Kilbride	Gorey
Clologe Lower	217	Scarawalsh	Kilbride	Enniscorthy
Clologe Upper	120	Scarawalsh	Kilbride	Gorey
Clolourish	21	Scarawalsh	Clone	Enniscorthy
Clolourish	17	Scarawalsh	Templeshannon	Enniscorthy
Clonamona Lower	296	Gorey	Rossminoge	Gorey
Clonamona Upper	358	Gorey	Rossminoge	Gorey
Clonard Great	148	Forth	St. Peter's	Wexford
Clonard Little	147	Forth	St. Peter's	Wexford
Clonatin Lower	257	Gorey	Kilmakilloge	Gorey
Clonatin Upper	213	Gorey	Kilmakilloge	Gorey
Clondarragh	78	Gorey	Kilcavan	Gorey
Clondaw	315	Ballaghkeen	Kilcormick	Enniscorthy
Clone	1,009	Scarawalsh	Clone	Enniscorthy
Clone East	291	Ballaghkeen	Monamolin	Gorey
Clone West	424	Ballaghkeen	Monamolin	Gorey
Clonee Lower	433	Scarawalsh	Kilcomb	Gorey
Clonee Upper	549	Scarawalsh	Kilcomb	Gorey
Cloneranny	310	Gorey	Kilgorman	Gorey
Clones Lower	113	Gorey	Kilgorman	Gorey
Clones Middle	175	Gorey	Kilgorman	Gorey
Clones Upper	203	Gorey	Kilgorman	Gorey
Clonevin	206	Ballaghkeen	Donaghmore	Gorey
Clongaddy	93	Bargy	Kilturk	Wexford
Clonganny	245	Gorey	Kiltrisk	Gorey
Clonganny	39	Ballaghkeen	Donaghmore	Gorey
**Clongeen**	Town	Shelmaliere West	Clongeen	New Ross
Clongeen	528	Shelmaliere West	Clongeen	New Ross
Clonhasten	477	Ballaghkeen	Templeshannon	Enniscorthy
Clonhenret	205	Scarawalsh	Toome	Gorey
Clonjordan	702	Scarawalsh	Templeshanbo	Enniscorthy
Clonlard	274	Shelburne	St. James & Dunbrody	New Ross
Clonleigh	991	Bantry	Clonleigh	New Ross
Clonmines	1,251	Shelburne	Clonmines	New Ross
Clonmore	315	Bantry	Clonmore	Enniscorthy
Clonmore	230	Gorey	Toome	Gorey
Clonmore	207	Gorey	Liskinfere	Gorey
Clonmore Lower	369	Ballaghkeen	Ballyhuskard	Enniscorthy
Clonmore Upper	384	Ballaghkeen	Ballyhuskard	Enniscorthy
Clonnasheege	163	Ballaghkeen	Kilmallock	Enniscorthy
Clonough	162	Gorey	Kilgorman	Gorey
**Clonroche**	Town	Bantry	Chapel	Enniscorthy
Clonroche	773	Bantry	Chapel	Enniscorthy
Clonroe	230	Gorey	Kilnenor	Gorey
Clonroe	225	Gorey	Kilnenor	Gorey
Clonsharragh	527	Shelburne	St. James & Dunbrody	New Ross
Clonsilla East	300	Gorey	Kilcavan	Gorey
Clonsilla West	271	Gorey	Kilcavan	Gorey
Clonyburn	204	Scarawalsh	St. Mary's, Newtownbarry	Enniscorthy
Cloon	54	Forth	Mayglass	Wexford
Cloonagh	326	Shelburne	Owenduff	New Ross
Cloonerane	388	Shelmaliere West	Taghmon	Wexford
Cloroge Beg	1,195	Scarawalsh	Templeshanbo	Enniscorthy
Cloroge More	953	Scarawalsh	Templeshanbo	Enniscorthy
Clough	25	Bantry	Clonmore	Enniscorthy
Clougheast	106	Forth	Carn	Wexford
Coalspit	53	Forth	Mayglass	Wexford
Coddstown Great	99	Forth	Ballymore	Wexford
Coddstown Little	153	Forth	Ballymore	Wexford
Coldblow	37	Forth	Ladysisland	Wexford
Coldblow	16	Forth	Tacumshin	Wexford
Coleman	551	Shelburne	St. James & Dunbrody	New Ross
Colestown	180	Shelmaliere West	Carrick	Wexford
College	112	Shelmaliere West	Carrick	Wexford
Common	114	Bargy	Mulrankin	Wexford
Common	15	Forth	Killinick	Wexford
Commons	121	Bargy	Duncormick	Wexford
Commons	4	Bargy	Ambrosetown	Wexford
Commons Lower (or Newtown)	698	Bantry	St. Mary's	New Ross
Connagh	410	Shelburne	Fethard	New Ross
Connahill	311	Gorey	Kilnahue	Gorey
Cookstown	172	Ballaghkeen	Donaghmore	Gorey
Cooladine	572	Ballaghkeen	Ballyhuskard	Enniscorthy
Coolafullaun	219	Bantry	Ballyhoge	Enniscorthy
Coolakip	227	Ballaghkeen	Ballynaslaney	Enniscorthy
Coolaknick	265	Ballaghkeen	Edermine	Enniscorthy
Coolaknick Beg	61	Ballaghkeen	Edermine	Enniscorthy
Coolamain	604	Ballaghkeen	Ballynaslaney	Enniscorthy
Coolamurry	419	Bantry	Rossdroit	Enniscorthy
Coolateggart	165	Shelmaliere West	Taghmon	Wexford
Coolatin	256	Scarawalsh	St. Mary's, Newtownbarry	Enniscorthy
Coolatore	221	Gorey	Kiltrisk	Gorey
Coolatrindle	216	Gorey	Kiltrisk	Gorey
Coolaught	444	Bantry	Killegney	Enniscorthy
Coolaw	301	Shelmaliere West	Taghmon	Wexford
Coolback	204	Bantry	Ballyanne	New Ross
Coolballow	125	Forth	Kerloge	Wexford
Coolbaun	332	Scarawalsh	Ferns	Enniscorthy
Coolbawn Demesne	559	Bantry	Templeludigan	New Ross
Coolboy	417	Shelmaliere West	Inch	New Ross
Coolbrock	174	Bargy	Kilcavan	Wexford
Coolcam	14	Forth	Carn	Wexford
Coolcliffe	220	Shelmaliere West	Ballymitty	Wexford
Coolcots	459	Shelmaliere West	Carrick	Wexford
Coolcull Big	229	Shelmaliere West	Taghmon	Wexford
Coolcull(Moylers)	132	Shelmaliere West	Taghmon	Wexford
Coolcull(Sheas)	119	Shelmaliere West	Taghmon	Wexford
Coole	690	Shelburne	Killesk	New Ross
Coole	133	Ballaghkeen	Kilmallock	Enniscorthy
Coolerin	117	Shelburne	Kilmokea	New Ross
Coolerin North	38	Shelburne	Ballybrazil	New Ross
Coolerin South	24	Shelburne	Ballybrazil	New Ross
Coolgarrow	404	Ballaghkeen	Templeshannon	Enniscorthy
Coolgarrow	265	Scarawalsh	St. Mary's, Newtownbarry	Enniscorthy
**Coolgreany**	Town	Gorey	Inch	Gorey
Coolgreany	123	Gorey	Inch	Gorey
Coolgreany Demesne	147	Gorey	Inch	Gorey
Coolharbour	123	Ballaghkeen	Kilnamanagh	Gorey
Coolhull	292	Bargy	Bannow	Wexford
Coolintaggart	218	Gorey	Kilcavan	Gorey
Coolintaggarthill	170	Gorey	Kilcavan	Gorey
Coolishal	295	Bargy	Bannow	Wexford
Coolishal Lower	259	Gorey	Kilnahue	Gorey
Coolishal Upper	269	Gorey	Kilnahue	Gorey
Coolkeeran	60	Forth	Killinick	Wexford
Coolmela (or Prospect)	1,059	Scarawalsh	Moyacomb	Shillelagh
Coolnaboy	507	Ballaghkeen	Edermine	Enniscorthy
Coolnacon	360	Bantry	Killegney	Enniscorthy
Coolnagloose	203	Gorey	Kilcavan	Gorey
Coolnagree	397	Bantry	Doonooney	Wexford
Coolnahinch	165	Ballaghkeen	Kilmakilloge	Gorey
Coolnahorna	590	Scarawalsh	Monart	Enniscorthy
Coolnaleen	547	Scarawalsh	Kilcomb	Gorey
Coolnastudd	243	Gorey	Kilnahue	Gorey
Coolnaveagh	226	Ballaghkeen	Kilmakilloge	Gorey
Coolook Beg	145	Ballaghkeen	Killenagh	Gorey
Coolook More	369	Ballaghkeen	Killenagh	Gorey
Coolougher	109	Forth	Mayglass	Wexford
Coolpeach	33	Forth	Drinagh	Wexford
Coolpuck	217	Scarawalsh	Ferns	Enniscorthy
Coolraheen	334	Shelmaliere West	Taghmon	Wexford
Coolrainey	177	Shelmaliere East	St. Margaret's	Wexford
Coolree	569	Scarawalsh	Templeshanbo	Enniscorthy
Coolree	45	Forth	St. Peter's	Wexford
Coolroe	433	Shelburne	Tintern	New Ross
Coolroe	336	Bantry	Chapel	Enniscorthy
Coolroe	334	Ballaghkeen	Killincooly	Gorey
Coolroe	84	Scarawalsh	Ferns	Enniscorthy
Coolroe Great	176	Gorey	Kilgorman	Gorey
Coolroe Little	112	Gorey	Kilgorman	Gorey
Cools	488	Shelmaliere West	Kilbrideglynn	Wexford
Cools	148	Shelmaliere West	Coolstuff	Wexford
Cools	22	Forth	Carn	Wexford
Coolsallagh	186	Bargy	Kilmannan	Wexford
Coolseskin	172	Bargy	Bannow	Wexford
Coolstuff	155	Shelmaliere West	Coolstuff	Wexford
Coolteen	115	Shelmaliere West	Kilbrideglynn	Wexford
Coolteige	242	Shelmaliere West	Clonmore	Enniscorthy
Coolthawn	109	Gorey	Kilnahue	Gorey
Coolycall	139	Bargy	Kilcowan	Wexford
Coolycarney	522	Scarawalsh	Templeshanbo	Enniscorthy
Coonoge	460	Bantry	Adamstown	New Ross
Cooperstown	143	Ballaghkeen	Donaghmore	Gorey
Cooraun	158	Ballaghkeen	Edermine	Enniscorthy
Coorduff	330	Scarawalsh	St. Mary's, Newtownbarry	Enniscorthy
Corah	469	Scarawalsh	Ballycarney	Enniscorthy
Corbally	292	Scarawalsh	Templeshannon	Enniscorthy
Corbally	195	Gorey	Kiltrisk	Gorey
Corbetstown	58	Scarawalsh	Kilbride	Enniscorthy
Corcanon	306	Gorey	Kilcavan	Gorey
Corderraun	140	Shelburne	Owenduff	New Ross
Corlican	729	Bantry	Whitechurchglynn	Wexford
Cornerstown	51	Forth	Mayglass	Wexford
Cornwall	199	Shelmaliere West	Killurin	Wexford
Corrageen	686	Bantry	Killann	Enniscorthy
Corragh	752	Scarawalsh	Moyacomb	Shillelagh
Corramacorra	132	Forth	Kildavin	Wexford
Cosher	47	Ballaghkeen	Killincooly	Gorey
Cottage	37	Forth	Ballybrennan	Wexford
Cotts	135	Forth	Tacumshin	Wexford
Courtballyedmond	312	Ballaghkeen	Monamolin	Gorey
Courtclogh Lower	289	Ballaghkeen	Castle-ellis	Enniscorthy
Courtclogh Upper	356	Ballaghkeen	Castle-ellis	Enniscorthy
Courteencurragh	337	Gorey	Kilmakilloge	Gorey
Courthoyle New	466	Bantry	Newbawn	New Ross
Courthoyle Old	394	Bantry	Newbawn	New Ross
Courtlands East	80	Forth	Mayglass	Wexford
Courtlands West	79	Forth	Mayglass	Wexford
Courtnacuddy	1,078	Bantry	Rossdroit	Enniscorthy
Courtown	295	Ballaghkeen	Kiltennell	Gorey
**Courtown Harbour**	Town	Ballaghkeen	Ardamine	Gorey
Cousinstown	230	Bargy	Tomhaggard	Wexford
Cousinstown	46	Forth	St. Margaret's	Wexford
Craan	1,612	Scarawalsh	St. Mary's, Newtownbarry	Enniscorthy
Craan	306	Scarawalsh	Ferns	Enniscorthy
Craan	276	Gorey	Kilpipe	Gorey
Craan	184	Ballaghkeen	Kilnamanagh	Gorey
Craan Lower	320	Gorey	Kilnahue	Gorey
Craan Upper	447	Gorey	Kilnahue	Gorey
Craanagam	102	Shelmaliere East	Ardcavan	Wexford
Craanatore	9	Shelmaliere East	Ardcolm	Wexford
Craane	187	Bantry	Clonmore	Enniscorthy
Craanhill	320	Gorey	Kilnahue	Gorey
Craanroe	123	Ballaghkeen	Edermine	Enniscorthy
Craigue Little	237	Bargy	Bannow	Wexford
Cranacrower	146	Gorey	Ballycanew	Gorey
Crandaniel	6	Ballaghkeen	Donaghmore	Gorey
Crandaniel Great	201	Gorey	Kiltrisk	Gorey
Crandaniel Little	170	Gorey	Kiltrisk	Gorey
Crandonnell	167	Shelmaliere West	Kilbrideglynn	Wexford
Crane	425	Scarawalsh	Clone	Enniscorthy
Craywell	11	Bantry	St. Mary's	New Ross
Creagh Demesne	298	Gorey	Kilnahue	Gorey
Creagh Lower	167	Gorey	Kilnahue	Gorey
Creagh Upper	296	Gorey	Kilnahue	Gorey
Creakan Lower	271	Bantry	Oldross	New Ross
Creakan Upper	220	Bantry	Oldross	New Ross
Creemore	145	Ballaghkeen	Meelnagh	Gorey
Creemore	118	Ballaghkeen	Kilmuckridge	Gorey
Crefoge	281	Ballaghkeen	Templeshannon	Enniscorthy
Cregg	88	Forth	Mayglass	Wexford
Cribstown	43	Forth	Rathaspick	Wexford
Croase	351	Bargy	Ballyconnick	Wexford
Croghan Middle	202	Gorey	Kilnenor	Gorey
Croghan Mountain	653	Gorey	Kilnenor	Gorey
Croghan Upper	177	Gorey	Kilnenor	Gorey
Cromoge	591	Scarawalsh	St. Mary's, Newtownbarry	Enniscorthy
Cromwellsfort	32	Forth	Maudlintown	Wexford
Cronecribbin	144	Gorey	Inch	Gorey
Cronecribbin	90	Gorey	Kilgorman	Gorey
Cronellard	121	Ballaghkeen	Kilcavan	Gorey
Cronyhorn	128	Scarawalsh	Kilbride	Enniscorthy
Crory	416	Scarawalsh	Ferns	Enniscorthy
Crory Lower	125	Shelmaliere East	Artramon	Wexford
Crory Middle	174	Shelmaliere East	Artramon	Wexford
Crory Upper	215	Shelmaliere East	Artramon	Wexford
Crossabeg	57	Shelmaliere East	Artramon	Wexford
Crossfarnoge	59	Bargy	Kilmore	Wexford
Crosshue	291	Ballaghkeen	Killila	Enniscorthy
Crosslands	12	Forth	Carn	Wexford
Crossscales	155	Bargy	Tomhaggard	Wexford
Crosstown	348	Shelmaliere East	Ardcavan	Wexford
Crosstown	66	Forth	Mayglass	Wexford
Crylough	56	Forth	Ballymore	Wexford
Cubslough	32	Forth	Mayglass	Wexford
Cull	280	Bargy	Killag	Wexford
Cull Island	4	Bargy	Killag	Wexford
Cullenoge	305	Gorey	Kilcavan	Gorey
Cullenstown	545	Shelmaliere West	Horetown	New Ross
Cullenstown	339	Bargy	Bannow	Wexford
Cullentra	575	Gorey	Monamolin	Gorey
Cullentra	177	Ballaghkeen	Donaghmore	Gorey
Cullentra	111	Shelmaliere West	Carrick	Wexford
Cullentragh	734	Scarawalsh	Templeshanbo	Enniscorthy
Cummer	352	Gorey	Kilnahue	Gorey
Cummerduff	644	Gorey	Crosspatrick	Gorey
Cumshinstown	100	Forth	Tacumshin	Wexford
Curelogh	304	Ballaghkeen	Killisk	Enniscorthy
Curracloe	192	Shelmaliere East	St. Margaret's	Wexford
Curraduff	394	Scarawalsh	Kilrush	Enniscorthy
Curraduff	386	Scarawalsh	Templeshanbo	Enniscorthy
Curragh	124	Gorey	Kilcavan	Gorey
Curraghduff	187	Shelburne	Ballybrazil	New Ross
Curraghduff	106	Gorey	Monamolin	Gorey
Curraghgraigue	655	Scarawalsh	Templeshanbo	Enniscorthy
Curraghmore	461	Shelburne	Tintern	New Ross
Curraghmore	320	Shelburne	Rathroe	New Ross
Curraghnabola	269	Bantry	Kilcowanmore	Enniscorthy
Curraghwood	63	Gorey	Kilcavan	Gorey
Curralane	372	Scarawalsh	Kilrush	Enniscorthy
Curralane Oldtown	145	Scarawalsh	Kilrush	Enniscorthy
Curratubbin Lower	138	Gorey	Monamolin	Gorey
Curratubbin Upper	183	Gorey	Monamolin	Gorey
Curraun	296	Bantry	St. Mullin's	New Ross
Cushenstown (or Cushinstown)	1,352	Bantry	Carnagh	New Ross
Custodium	144	Gorey	Kilnenor	Gorey
Damptown	46	Forth	Mayglass	Wexford
Danescastle	456	Bargy	Bannow	Wexford
Daphney	37	Scarawalsh	Monart	Enniscorthy
Davidstown	455	Shelmaliere West	Kilbrideglynn	Wexford
Davidstown	455	Bantry	Whitechurchglynn	Wexford
Davidstown	292	Bantry	Rossdroit	Enniscorthy
Davidstown (or Ballydaw)	328	Scarawalsh	Monart	Enniscorthy
Deeps	236	Shelmaliere East	Tikillin	Wexford
Deerpark	247	Gorey	Kilnahue	Gorey
Deerpark	132	Shelmaliere West	Horetown	New Ross
Dennistown	144	Forth	Kildavin	Wexford
Derry	295	Ballaghkeen	Ballyhuskard	Enniscorthy
Donaghmore	76	Ballaghkeen	Donaghmore	Gorey
Donard	525	Bantry	Clonleigh	New Ross
Doogans Warren	64	Forth	Rosslare	Wexford
Doonooney	684	Bantry	Doonooney	Wexford
Doughal	118	Ballaghkeen	Ardamine	Gorey
Dranagh	568	Ballaghkeen	Kilcormick	Enniscorthy
Dranagh	403	Bantry	Rossdroit	Enniscorthy
Drillistown	156	Shelburne	Killesk	New Ross
Drimagh	11	Forth	Rosslare	Wexford
Drinagh	31	Forth	St. Margaret's	Wexford
Drinagh North	109	Forth	Drinagh	Wexford
Drinagh South	74	Forth	Drinagh	Wexford
Drumderry	592	Scarawalsh	Moyacomb	Shillelagh
Drumgold	702	Ballaghkeen	Templeshannon	Enniscorthy
Drummond	298	Scarawalsh	Carnew	Gorey
Duffcarrick	81	Ballaghkeen	Kiltennell	Gorey
Dughlone	146	Ballaghkeen	Kilmuckridge	Gorey
Dunanore	326	Bantry	Clonmore	Enniscorthy
Dunanore (or Goldentown)	432	Bantry	Oldross	New Ross
Dunbrody	325	Shelburne	St. James & Dunbrody	New Ross
**Duncannon**	Town	Shelburne	St. James & Dunbrody	New Ross
Duncannon	243	Shelburne	St. James & Dunbrody	New Ross
**Duncormick**	Town	Bargy	Duncormick	Wexford
Duncormick	202	Bargy	Duncormick	Wexford
Duncormick Hill	166	Bargy	Duncormick	Wexford
Dundrum	273	Ballaghkeen	Kilmuckridge	Gorey
Dunganstown	771	Shelburne	Whitechurch	New Ross
Dungeer	411	Shelmaliere West	Taghmon	Wexford
Dungeer	22	Shelmaliere West	Whitechurchglynn	Wexford
Dungulph	271	Shelburne	Fethard	New Ross
Dunishal	442	Scarawalsh	Carnew	Gorey
Dunmain	688	Shelburne	Owenduff	New Ross
Dunsinane	222	Bantry	Templescoby	Enniscorthy
Durra Big	139	Shelmaliere West	Taghmon	Wexford
Durra Little	86	Shelmaliere West	Taghmon	Wexford
Eardownes Great	161	Forth	Ladysisland	Wexford
Eardownes Little	25	Forth	Ladysisland	Wexford
Ecclestown	79	Forth	Tacumshin	Wexford
Edermine	99	Ballaghkeen	Edermine	Enniscorthy
Edwardstown	294	Bargy	Ballyconnick	Wexford
Effernoge	1,099	Scarawalsh	Ferns	Enniscorthy
Elevenacre	23	Forth	Killinick	Wexford
Enniscorthy	934	Scarawalsh	St. Mary's, Enniscorthy	Enniscorthy
**Enniscorthy (1.)**	Town	Ballaghkeen	Templeshannon	Enniscorthy
**Enniscorthy (2.)**	Town	Scarawalsh	St. Mary's, Enniscorthy	Enniscorthy
Fairfield	27	Forth	Rathaspick	Wexford
Fairfield (or Forgelands)	124	Scarawalsh	Monart	Enniscorthy
Fairyhill (or Ballyregan)	133	Shelmaliere East	Artramon	Wexford
Fannystown	153	Bargy	Duncormick	Wexford
Fardystown	326	Forth	Kildavin	Wexford
Farmhill (or Barratober)	131	Shelmaliere East	Artramon	Wexford
Farmley (or Skeahanagh)	330	Scarawalsh	Ballycarney	Enniscorthy
Farnatrane	59	Ballaghkeen	Ballyhuskard	Enniscorthy
Fary	94	Shelmaliere West	Clongeen	New Ross
Fasagh	16	Forth	Kilrane	Wexford
Faythe	60	Forth	Tacumshin	Wexford
Fence	48	Forth	Tacumshin	Wexford
**Ferns**	Town	Scarawalsh	Ferns	Enniscorthy
Ferns	5	Scarawalsh	Kilbride	Enniscorthy
Ferns Demesne	381	Scarawalsh	Ferns	Enniscorthy
Ferns Demesne	13	Scarawalsh	Kilbride	Enniscorthy
Ferns Lower	235	Scarawalsh	Ferns	Enniscorthy
Ferns Upper	174	Scarawalsh	Ferns	Enniscorthy
Fernyhill	54	Forth	Killinick	Wexford
Ferrybank North	4	Shelmaliere East	Ardcavan	Wexford
Ferrybank South	3	Shelmaliere East	Ardcavan	Wexford
Ferrycarrig	78	Shelmaliere East	Tikillin	Wexford
Ferrycarrig	23	Shelmaliere East	Kilpatrick	Wexford
**Fethard**	Town	Shelburne	Fethard	New Ross
Fethard	336	Shelburne	Fethard	New Ross
Finshoge	139	Bantry	Oldross	New Ross
Fisherstown	379	Shelburne	Kilmokea	New Ross
Fiveacre	10	Forth	Rosslare	Wexford
Fodagh	109	Ballaghkeen	Donaghmore	Gorey
**Ford**	Town	Ballaghkeen	Killincooly	Gorey
**Ford**	Town	Ballaghkeen	Kilmuckridge	Gorey
Ford of Ling	45	Forth	Kilscoran	Wexford
Ford of Ling	18	Forth	Ballybrennan	Wexford
Forest	251	Shelmaliere West	Taghmon	Wexford
Forestwood	195	Bantry	Killegney	Mountmellick
Forgelands (or Fairfield)	124	Scarawalsh	Monart	Enniscorthy
Forrestalstown	772	Bantry	Killegney	Enniscorthy
Fortchester Lower	295	Gorey	Inch	Gorey
Fortchester Upper	183	Gorey	Inch	Gorey
Forth Commons	835	Forth	Kildavin	Wexford
Forth Commons	331	Forth	Rathaspick	Wexford
Forth Commons	122	Forth	St. Peter's	Wexford
Forties	203	Scarawalsh	Kilbride	Enniscorthy
Fortyacres	72	Forth	Rathaspick	Wexford
**Foulkesmill**	Town	Shelmaliere West	Ballylannan	New Ross
**Foulkesmill**	Town	Shelmaliere West	Clongeen & Horetown	New Ross
Foxcover	269	Gorey	Kilnahue	Gorey
Frankfort	188	Gorey	Liskinfere	Gorey
Fuddletown	99	Forth	Mayglass	Wexford
Funshoge	114	Ballaghkeen	Killincooly	Gorey
Furlongstown	278	Shelmaliere West	Coolstuff	Wexford
Furziestown	128	Forth	Tacumshin	Wexford
Galbally	805	Bantry	Ballyhoge	Enniscorthy
Galbally	242	Shelmaliere East	Ardcolm	Wexford
Galbally	65	Shelmaliere East	Artramon	Wexford
Galbally East	32	Shelmaliere East	Kilpatrick	Wexford
Galbally North	12	Shelmaliere East	Kilpatrick	Wexford
Galbally West	25	Shelmaliere East	Kilpatrick	Wexford
Galballybeg	81	Shelmaliere East	Skreen	Wexford
Galgystown	122	Shelburne	Hook	New Ross
Gallagh	179	Bargy	Kilturk	Wexford
Gardamus Great	207	Forth	Mayglass	Wexford
Gardamus Little	116	Forth	Mayglass	Wexford
Garnakill	87	Ballaghkeen	Killenagh	Gorey
Garr	116	Bantry	Clonmore	Enniscorthy
Garra	110	Ballaghkeen	Meelnagh	Enniscorthy
Garradreen	163	Shelmaliere West	Coolstuff	Wexford
Garranstackle	640	Bantry	Ballyhoge	Enniscorthy
Garrantrowlan	175	Ballaghkeen	Ballyhuskard	Enniscorthy
Garraun	275	Ballaghkeen	Meelnagh	Enniscorthy
Garraun	66	Ballaghkeen	Ballyvaldon	Enniscorthy
Garraun Lower	450	Bantry	Killann	Enniscorthy
Garraun Upper	496	Bantry	Killann	Enniscorthy
Garrison	164	Bargy	Duncormick	Wexford
Garrybran	244	Ballaghkeen	Meelnagh	Enniscorthy
Garrybrit Lower	256	Gorey	Kilcormick	Enniscorthy
Garrybrit Upper	103	Gorey	Kilcormick	Enniscorthy
Garrycleary	205	Shelmaliere East	Kilpatrick	Wexford
Garrycullen	383	Shelburne	Tintern	New Ross
Garrydaniel	420	Ballaghkeen	Monamolin	Gorey
Garryduff	412	Shelburne	Owenduff	New Ross
Garryduff	321	Ballaghkeen	Kilcormick	Enniscorthy
Garrygibbon	115	Shelmaliere East	Ardcolm	Wexford
Garryhack	126	Forth	Ballymore	Wexford
Garryhasten	904	Scarawalsh	Moyacomb	Shillelagh
Garryhubbock	210	Ballaghkeen	St. Nicholas	Enniscorthy
Garrylough Lower	394	Ballaghkeen	St. Nicholas	Enniscorthy
Garrylough Upper	126	Ballaghkeen	St. Nicholas	Enniscorthy
Garrymile	383	Ballaghkeen	Ballyhuskard	Enniscorthy
Garrymore	81	Ballaghkeen	Castle-ellis	Enniscorthy
Garrymoyle	63	Ballaghkeen	Ballyvaldon	Enniscorthy
Garrynew	376	Ballaghkeen	Ardamine	Gorey
Garrynisk	263	Ballaghkeen	Castle-ellis	Enniscorthy
Garrynisk	148	Ballaghkeen	Edermine	Enniscorthy
Garryniskbeg	71	Ballaghkeen	Castle-ellis	Enniscorthy
Garryntinodagh	133	Ballaghkeen	Killisk	Enniscorthy
Garryphelim	184	Scarawalsh	Clone	Enniscorthy
Garryrichard	265	Shelmaliere West	Clongeen	New Ross
Garryvadden	268	Ballaghkeen	Castle-ellis	Enniscorthy
Garryvadden Lower	271	Ballaghkeen	Castle-ellis	Enniscorthy
Garryvadden Upper	279	Ballaghkeen	Castle-ellis	Enniscorthy
Garryvaddenbeg	57	Ballaghkeen	Castle-ellis	Enniscorthy
Garryvarren	370	Ballaghkeen	Kilmallock	Enniscorthy
Garrywilliam	176	Shelmaliere East	Kilpatrick	Wexford
Gaynestown	177	Bargy	Kilmannan	Wexford
Genstown	148	Bargy	Tomhaggard	Wexford
Gerry	92	Ballaghkeen	Donaghmore	Gorey
Gibberpatrick	202	Bargy	Duncormick	Wexford
Gibberwell	196	Bargy	Duncormick	Wexford
Gibboghstown	37	Forth	Ballymore	Wexford
Gibletstown	110	Bargy	Ambrosetown	Wexford
Glaglig	27	Forth	St. Iberius	Wexford
Glandoran Lower	153	Gorey	Kilnahue	Gorey
Glandoran Upper	75	Gorey	Kilnahue	Gorey
Glascarrig North	189	Ballaghkeen	Donaghmore	Gorey
Glascarrig South	352	Ballaghkeen	Donaghmore	Gorey
Glasganny	226	Shelmaliere East	Ardcavan	Wexford
Glaslacken	237	Scarawalsh	St. Mary's, Newtownbarry	Enniscorthy
Glebe	52	Shelmaliere East	Ardcolm	Wexford
Glebe	48	Ballaghkeen	Meelnagh	Enniscorthy
Glebe	43	Ballaghkeen	Monamolin	Gorey
Glebe	33	Ballaghkeen	Edermine	Enniscorthy
Glebe	33	Ballaghkeen	Killisk	Enniscorthy
Glebe	33	Ballaghkeen	Skreen	Wexford
Glebe	31	Ballaghkeen	Killila	Enniscorthy
Glebe	29	Gorey	Kilnenor	Gorey
Glebe	26	Gorey	Kiltrisk	Gorey
Glebe	26	Bargy	Kilturk	Wexford
Glebe	15	Bargy	Duncormick	Wexford
Glebe	14	Forth	Mayglass	Wexford
Glebe	9	Bargy	Kilmannan	Wexford
Glebe	5	Ballaghkeen	St. Nicholas	Enniscorthy
Glen (Doyne)	162	Ballaghkeen	Ardamine	Gorey
Glen (Richards)	297	Ballaghkeen	Ardamine	Gorey
Glenbaun	124	Gorey	Kilcormick	Enniscorthy
Glenbough	213	Shelmaliere East	St. Margaret's	Wexford
Glenbullock	34	Bargy	Kilmannan	Wexford
Glendrislagh	15	Bargy	Kilmanman	Wexford
Glenduff	65	Shelmaliere West	Kilbrideglynn	Wexford
Glengass	440	Bantry	Killann	Enniscorthy
Glennagark	260	Ballaghkeen	Kilcormick	Enniscorthy
Glennaglogh	122	Ballaghkeen	Kiltennell	Gorey
Glennameenagh (or Springvale)	283	Scarawalsh	Ballycarney	Enniscorthy
Glenoge	257	Gorey	Inch	Gorey
Glenoge	234	Gorey	Kilnenor	Gorey
Glenour	273	Shelmaliere West	Kilgarvan	New Ross
Glenranny	374	Ballaghkeen	Kilcormick	Gorey
Glenroe	107	Shelmaliere West	Clongeen	New Ross
Glenteige	71	Ballaghkeen	Edermine	Enniscorthy
Glentire	116	Ballaghkeen	Killisk	Enniscorthy
Gobbinstown	649	Bantry	Ballyanne	New Ross
Goldentown (or Dunanore)	432	Bantry	Oldross	New Ross
**Gorey**	Town	Gorey	Kilmakilloge	Gorey
**Gorey**	Town	Ballaghkeen	Kilmakilloge	Gorey
Gorey Corporation Lands	402	Gorey	Kilmakilloge	Gorey
Goreybridge	118	Gorey	Kilmakilloge	Gorey
Goreyhill	200	Gorey	Kilmakilloge	Gorey
Gorteen	880	Scarawalsh	Templeshanbo	Enniscorthy
Gorteen	414	Scarawalsh	Kilrush	Enniscorthy
Gorteen Lower	244	Gorey	Inch	Gorey
Gorteen Upper	330	Gorey	Inch	Gorey
Gorteencrin	19	Forth	Kilscoran	Wexford
Gorteenminoge Lower	236	Forth	Kildavin	Wexford
Gorteenminoge Upper	238	Forth	Kildavin	Wexford
Gorteens	283	Shelburne	Fethard	New Ross
Gortins	79	Bargy	Duncormick	Wexford
Gortins Great	143	Bargy	Kilmannan	Wexford
Gortins Little	143	Bargy	Kilmannan	Wexford
Grageelagh	129	Forth	Ballymore	Wexford
Grageen	56	Forth	Ballymore	Wexford
Grageen Little	22	Forth	Ballymore	Wexford
Graheeroge	150	Forth	Ballymore	Wexford
Grahormack	114	Forth	Rosslare	Wexford
Grahormick	199	Forth	Ballymore	Wexford
Graigue	230	Bargy	Kilcavan	Wexford
Graigue	197	Bargy	Bannow	Wexford
Graigue Beg	645	Scarawalsh	Kilrush	Enniscorthy
Graigue Great	343	Shelburne	Templetown	New Ross
Graigue Little	284	Shelburne	Templetown	New Ross
Graigue More	960	Scarawalsh	Kilrush	Enniscorthy
Graiguesallagh	142	Bargy	Duncormick	Wexford
Grange	869	Shelburne	Fethard	New Ross
Grange	579	Bargy	Bannow	Wexford
Grange	497	Shelburne	St. James & Dunbrody	New Ross
Grange	322	Ballaghkeen	Kilcormick	Enniscorthy
Grange	189	Bargy	Kilmore	Wexford
Grange	167	Forth	Kilmacree	Wexford
Grange	162	Forth	Ishartmon	Wexford
Grange	101	Forth	St. Iberius	Wexford
Grange Big	111	Forth	Rosslare	Wexford
Grange Demesne	253	Bantry	Killann	Enniscorthy
Grange Little	90	Forth	Rosslare	Wexford
Grange Lower	444	Bantry	Killann	Enniscorthy
Grange Upper	571	Bantry	Killann	Enniscorthy
Granisk	120	Forth	Mayglass	Wexford
Grascur Great	80	Bargy	Kilcowan	Wexford
Grascur Little	38	Bargy	Kilcowan	Wexford
Grayrobin	241	Bargy	Tomhaggard	Wexford
Greatisland	799	Shelburne	Kilmokea	New Ross
Greenan	316	Bantry	Killann	Enniscorthy
Greenfield	66	Forth	Ballymore	Wexford
Greenhall	80	Ballaghkeen	Kilnamanagh	Gorey
Greenville	92	Scarawalsh	St. Mary's, Enniscorthy	Enniscorthy
Gregorystown	31	Forth	Rathmacknee	Wexford
Grogan	78	Forth	Tacumshin	Wexford
Grogan Burrow	134	Forth	Tacumshin	Wexford
Grove Great	184	Gorey	Kilnahue	Gorey
Grove Little	99	Gorey	Kilnahue	Gorey
Grovemill	49	Gorey	Kilnahue	Gorey
Growtown Lower	233	Shelmaliere West	Coolstuff	Wexford
Growtown Upper	335	Shelmaliere West	Coolstuff	Wexford
Gurlins	125	Bargy	Duncormick	Wexford
Haggard	620	Shelburne	Rathroe	New Ross
Haggard	294	Shelburne	Templetown	New Ross
Haggard	240	Bargy	Bannow	Wexford
Haggardtown	59	Forth	Mayglass	Wexford
Halseyrath	131	Bargy	Ambrosetown	Wexford
Hardyglass	49	Forth	Tacumshin	Wexford
Hardygregan	44	Forth	Mayglass	Wexford
Haresmead	302	Shelmaliere West	Horetown	New Ross
Harperstown	370	Bargy	Taghmon	Wexford
Harpoonstown	182	Bargy	Mulrankin	Wexford
Harristown	273	Bargy	Kilcavan	Wexford
Harristown	101	Forth	Kilrane	Wexford
Harristown (or Reask)	116	Bargy	Kilcavan	Wexford
Harristown Big	307	Shelmaliere West	Kilbrideglynn	Wexford
Harristown Little	276	Shelmaliere West	Kilbrideglynn	Wexford
Harveystown	217	Shelmaliere West	Coolstuff	Wexford
Harveystown	62	Forth	Ballymore	Wexford
Hayesland	157	Forth	Kilrane	Wexford
Hayestown Great	502	Forth	Rathaspick	Wexford
Hayestown Little	156	Forth	Rathaspick	Wexford
Haystown	421	Bantry	Whitechurchglynn	Wexford
Haytown	127	Shelburne	Templetown	New Ross
Healthfield	790	Shelmaliere West	Killurin	Wexford
Healysland	21	Bantry	St. Mary's	New Ross
Heathpark	324	Bantry	Oldross	New Ross
Heaths	19	Forth	Tacumshin	Wexford
Heavenstown	124	Bargy	Kilmannan	Wexford
Hermitage (or Whitestown Lower)	37	Forth	Drinagh	Wexford
Hewitsland	52	Bantry	St. Mary's	New Ross
Hightown	76	Bargy	Duncormick	Wexford
Hill	158	Bargy	Kilturk	Wexford
Hill of Sea	89	Forth	Rosslare	Wexford
Hillburn	117	Shelmaliere West	Taghmon	New Ross
Hillcastle	145	Forth	Kilscoran	Wexford
Hilltown	277	Shelmaliere West	Ballymitty	Wexford
Hilltown	126	Forth	Ballymore	Wexford
Hilltown	117	Forth	Kilrane	Wexford
Hilltown	70	Forth	Tacumshin	Wexford
Hilltown	15	Forth	Carn	Wexford
Hilltown	12	Forth	Ladysisland	Wexford
Hobbinstown	62	Forth	Rathmacknee	Wexford
Hodgesmill	48	Forth	Rathmacknee	Wexford
Hollyfort	118	Gorey	Kilnahue	Gorey
Hollyfort	115	Scarawalsh	Monart	Enniscorthy
Hollyfort	43	Gorey	Kilgorman	Gorey
Holmanhill	69	Bargy	Ambrosetown	Wexford
Holmestown Great	170	Shelmaliere West	Kilbrideglynn	Wexford
Holmestown Little	172	Shelmaliere West	Kilbrideglynn	Wexford
Hooks	113	Bargy	Kilcowan	Wexford
Hopefield	119	Shelmaliere West	Horetown	New Ross
Hopeland	214	Forth	Rosslare	Wexford
Horesland	191	Bargy	Duncormick	Wexford
Horeswood	266	Shelburne	Kilmokea	New Ross
Horetown	84	Forth	Killinick	Wexford
Horetown North	860	Shelmaliere West	Horetown	New Ross
Horetown South	301	Shelmaliere West	Horetown	New Ross
Houseland	289	Shelburne	Templetown	New Ross
Huntingtown	278	Gorey	Liskinfere	Gorey
Hydepark	182	Gorey	Kilgorman	Gorey
Inch	770	Ballaghkeen	Killila	Enniscorthy
Inch	117	Gorey	Inch	Gorey
Inish	114	Bargy	Killag	Wexford
Inish	19	Forth	Ladysisland	Wexford
Inish	4	Forth	Carn	Wexford
Irishtown	41	Bantry	St. Mary's	New Ross
Islafalcon	84	Shelmaliere East	Artramon	Wexford
Island	137	Ballaghkeen	Meelnagh	Gorey
Island	123	Ballaghkeen	Kilmuckridge	Gorey
Island	38	Ballaghkeen	Kilmallock	Enniscorthy
Island	10	Forth	Rosslare	Wexford
Island Lower	222	Gorey	Rossminoge	Gorey
Island Middle	133	Gorey	Rossminoge	Gorey
Island Upper	368	Gorey	Rossminoge	Gorey
Jacketstown	112	Forth	Drinagh	Wexford
Jamestown	294	Ballaghkeen	Edermine	Enniscorthy
Jamestown	153	Bantry	Templescoby	Enniscorthy
Johnstown	528	Bargy	Duncormick	Wexford
Johnstown	444	Scarawalsh	Moyacomb	Shillelagh
Johnstown	342	Shelmaliere East	Ardcolm	Wexford
Johnstown	152	Forth	Rathaspick	Wexford
Johnstown	57	Bargy	Mulrankin	Wexford
Jonastown	73	Forth	Ballymore	Wexford
Kavanaghspark	77	Shelmaliere East	Kilpatrick	Wexford
Kayle	440	Shelmaliere West	Inch	New Ross
Keeloges	97	Shelmaliere West	Kilbrideglynn	Wexford
Kellystown	917	Bantry	Adamstown	New Ross
Kellystown	93	Forth	Rathaspick	Wexford
Kellystown	92	Forth	Drinagh	Wexford
Kereight	840	Bantry	Ballyhoge	Enniscorthy
Kereight	185	Shelmaliere East	Kilpatrick	Wexford
Kereight	60	Shelmaliere East	Tikillin	Wexford
Kerloge	84	Forth	Kerloge	Wexford
Kilbegnet	105	Gorey	Kilgorman	Gorey
Kilbora	647	Scarawalsh	Ferns	Enniscorthy
Kilbraney	974	Shelmaliere West	Clongeen	New Ross
Kilbride	456	Shelburne	St. James & Dunbrody	New Ross
Kilbride	417	Ballaghkeen	Ballyhuskard	Enniscorthy
Kilbride	204	Ballaghkeen	Kiltennell	Gorey
Kilcannon	528	Scarawalsh	St. Mary's, Enniscorthy	Enniscorthy
Kilcarbry	17	Bantry	Clonmore	Enniscorthy
Kilcasey Lower	148	Scarawalsh	Kilbride	Enniscorthy
Kilcasey Upper	175	Scarawalsh	Kilbride	Enniscorthy
Kilcavan	179	Bargy	Kilcavan	Wexford
Kilcavan (Old Mill)	265	Bargy	Kilcavan	Wexford
Kilcavan (Retrenched)	141	Bargy	Kilcavan	Wexford
Kilcavan (Tree)	75	Bargy	Kilcavan	Wexford
Kilcavan Lower	220	Gorey	Kilcavan	Gorey
Kilcavan Upper	279	Gorey	Kilcavan	Gorey
Kilcaysan	47	Scarawalsh	Kilbride	Enniscorthy
Kilclammon	147	Bantry	Oldross	New Ross
Kilcloggan	326	Shelburne	Templetown	New Ross
Kilcloran	430	Scarawalsh	Kilcomb	Gorey
Kilcoilshy	172	Gorey	Kilcormick	Enniscorthy
Kilconnib	435	Ballaghkeen	Kilcormick	Enniscorthy
Kilcorkey	430	Gorey	Monamolin	Gorey
Kilcormick	389	Ballaghkeen	Kilcormick	Enniscorthy
Kilcorral	365	Shelmaliere East	Ardcavan	Wexford
Kilcotty Beg	216	Ballaghkeen	Ballyhuskard	Enniscorthy
Kilcotty More	303	Ballaghkeen	Ballyhuskard	Enniscorthy
Kilcowan Lower	79	Bargy	Kilcowan	Wexford
Kilcowan Upper	96	Bargy	Kilcowan	Wexford
Kilcullen	521	Scarawalsh	Templeshanbo	Enniscorthy
Kildalloo	206	Scarawalsh	Ballycarney	Enniscorthy
Kildavin Lower	182	Forth	Kildavin	Wexford
Kildavin Upper	106	Forth	Kildavin	Wexford
Kildermot	410	Ballaghkeen	Kiltennell	Gorey
Kildermot	223	Ballaghkeen	Kilcavan	Gorey
Kilderry	154	Bargy	Kilcavan	Wexford
Kildrimeen	98	Gorey	Monamolin	Gorey
Kilgarvan	316	Shelmaliere West	Kilgarvan	New Ross
Kilgibbon	480	Shelmaliere West	Clonmore	Enniscorthy
Kilgorman	53	Gorey	Kilgorman	Gorey
Kilhile	446	Shelburne	St. James & Dunbrody	New Ross
Killabeg	800	Scarawalsh	Clone	Enniscorthy
Killag	327	Bargy	Killag	Wexford
Killagoley	304	Ballaghkeen	Templeshannon	Enniscorthy
Killagowan	274	Ballaghkeen	Meelnagh	Gorey
Killahard	80	Ballaghkeen	Castle-ellis	Enniscorthy
Killalligan North	146	Scarawalsh	Monart	Enniscorthy
Killalligan South	90	Scarawalsh	Monart	Enniscorthy
Killann	563	Bantry	Killann	Enniscorthy
Killannaduff	121	Ballaghkeen	Donaghmore	Gorey
Killanure	251	Scarawalsh	St. Mary's, Newtownbarry	Enniscorthy
Killeagh	187	Ballaghkeen	Ballyvaldon	Enniscorthy
Killeen	134	Shelmaliere East	Kilpatrick	Wexford
Killeens	147	Forth	St. Peter's	Wexford
Killegney	1,014	Bantry	Killegney	Enniscorthy
Killegran	102	Ballaghkeen	Ardamine	Gorey
Killelan	274	Ballaghkeen	St. Nicholas	Enniscorthy
**Killenagh**	Town	Ballaghkeen	Killenagh	Gorey
Killenagh	38	Ballaghkeen	Killenagh	Gorey
Killesk	467	Shelburne	Killesk	New Ross
Killiane	259	Forth	Killiane	Wexford
Killiane Little	259	Forth	Killiane	Wexford
Killillane	92	Forth	St. Helen's	Wexford
Killincolly Beg	275	Ballaghkeen	Killincooly	Enniscorthy
Killincooly More	315	Ballaghkeen	Killincooly	Enniscorthy
**Killinick**	Town	Forth	Killinick	Wexford
Killinick	24	Forth	Killinick	Wexford
Killinierin	249	Gorey	Kilcavan	Gorey
Killisk	787	Ballaghkeen	Killisk	Enniscorthy
Killoughrum	926	Scarawalsh	Monart	Enniscorthy
Killowen	349	Gorey	Kilnahue	Gorey
Killowen	348	Shelmaliere East	Tikillin	Wexford
Killowen	233	Shelburne	Whitechurch	New Ross
Killowen Lower	273	Gorey	Kilgorman	Gorey
Killowen Upper	197	Gorey	Kilgorman	Gorey
Killugger	47	Forth	Kilmacree	Wexford
Killurin	366	Shelmaliere West	Killurin	Wexford
Killybegs	215	Gorey	Inch	Gorey
Killybegs	213	Gorey	Kilgorman	Gorey
Killynann	137	Gorey	Kilmakilloge	Gorey
Kilmacdermot	255	Scarawalsh	St. Mary's, Newtownbarry	Enniscorthy
Kilmacoe	625	Shelmaliere East	St. Margaret's	Wexford
Kilmacot	68	Ballaghkeen	Ballyvaldon	Enniscorthy
Kilmacree	108	Forth	Kilmacree	Wexford
Kilmallock	434	Ballaghkeen	Kilmallock	Enniscorthy
Kilmannan	99	Bargy	Kilmannan	Wexford
Kilmannan Little	13	Bargy	Kilmannan	Wexford
Kilmannock	239	Shelburne	Kilmokea	New Ross
Kilmichael	342	Gorey	Kilgorman	Gorey
Kilmichael	182	Ballaghkeen	Donaghmore	Gorey
Kilmichael Lower	247	Gorey	Kilnahue	Gorey
Kilmichael Upper	189	Gorey	Kilnahue	Gorey
Kilmichaelhill	213	Gorey	Kilnahue	Gorey
Kilmisten	92	Shelmaliere East	Ardcolm	Wexford
**Kilmore**	Town	Bargy	Kilmore	Wexford
Kilmuckridge	291	Ballaghkeen	Kilmuckridge	Enniscorthy
Kilmurry	437	Gorey	Kilmakilloge	Gorey
Kilnahue	302	Gorey	Kilnahue	Gorey
Kilnamanagh Lower	200	Ballaghkeen	Kilnamanagh	Gorey
Kilnamanagh Upper	313	Ballaghkeen	Kilnamanagh	Gorey
Kilnasmuttaun	160	Ballaghkeen	Killincooly	Enniscorthy
Kilnew	194	Ballaghkeen	Meelnagh	Enniscorthy
Kilnew	191	Ballaghkeen	Ballyvaldon	Enniscorthy
Kilpatrick	248	Gorey	Kilgorman	Gorey
Kilpatrick	238	Ballaghkeen	Kilnamanagh	Gorey
Kilpierce	267	Ballaghkeen	Templeshannon	Enniscorthy
Kilscanlan	527	Bantry	Kilscanlan	New Ross
Kilscoran	115	Forth	Kilscoran	Wexford
**Kiltealy**	Town	Scarawalsh	Templeshanbo	Enniscorthy
Kiltealy	1,080	Scarawalsh	Templeshanbo	Enniscorthy
Kiltennell	170	Ballaghkeen	Kiltennell	Gorey
Kilthomas	449	Scarawalsh	Ferns	Enniscorthy
Kiltillahan	570	Scarawalsh	Carnew	Gorey
Kiltilly	816	Scarawalsh	Kilrush	Enniscorthy
Kiltown	200	Scarawalsh	Ferns	Enniscorthy
Kiltra	305	Bargy	Bannow	Wexford
Kiltrea	443	Scarawalsh	Monart	Enniscorthy
King's Island	26	Shelmaliere West	Clonmore	Enniscorthy
Kinnagh	415	Shelburne	Tintern	New Ross
Kisha	74	Forth	St. Iberius	Wexford
Kitestown	113	Shelmaliere East	Kilpatrick	Wexford
Knock	23	Forth	Rathaspick	Wexford
Knock of the Rocks	27	Bargy	Kilmannan	Wexford
Knockadawk	268	Gorey	Kiltrisk	Gorey
Knockadilly	80	Ballaghkeen	Killincooly	Gorey
Knockahone	27	Shelmaliere West	Carrick	Wexford
Knockanduff	100	Shelburne	Templetown	New Ross
Knockaneasy	6	Forth	Carn	Wexford
Knockanevin	48	Ballaghkeen	Castle-ellis	Enniscorthy
Knockangall	55	Forth	Rathmacknee	Wexford
Knockanure	1,055	Scarawalsh	Kilrush	Enniscorthy
Knockaree	245	Scarawalsh	Kilrush	Enniscorthy
Knockataylor	47	Shelmaliere West	Ardcandrisk	Wexford
Knockatober	441	Bantry	Killann	Enniscorthy
Knockavilla	106	Bantry	St. Mary's	New Ross
Knockavocka	213	Gorey	Kilcormick	Enniscorthy
Knockavota	170	Gorey	Kilcavan	Gorey
Knockbaun	106	Gorey	Inch	Gorey
Knockbaun	68	Ballaghkeen	Castle-ellis	Enniscorthy
Knockbine	205	Bargy	Ambrosetown	Wexford
Knockbrack	172	Gorey	Kilnahue	Gorey
Knockbrack	54	Bargy	Kilmannan	Wexford
Knockbrandon Lower	351	Gorey	Rossminoge	Gorey
Knockbrandon Upper	357	Gorey	Rossminoge	Gorey
Knockbroad	78	Shelmaliere West	Coolstuff	Wexford
Knockcumshin	24	Shelmaliere West	Carrick	Wexford
Knockduff	471	Scarawalsh	Templeshanbo	Enniscorthy
Knockduff	331	Shelmaliere East	Clonmore	Enniscorthy
Knockduff	321	Scarawalsh	Clone	Enniscorthy
Knockduff	94	Shelmaliere East	Artramon	Wexford
Knockduff	66	Ballaghkeen	Kilmakilloge	Gorey
Knockduff	21	Shelmaliere East	Ballynaslaney	Enniscorthy
Knockea	407	Shelburne	Killesk	New Ross
Knockeen	83	Shelmaliere West	Kilbrideglynn	Wexford
Knockgreany	182	Gorey	Inch	Gorey
Knockhowlin	95	Forth	Ishartmon	Wexford
Knockhowlin	24	Forth	Ballymore	Wexford
Knockina	240	Gorey	Kilcavan	Gorey
Knocklahaun	106	Gorey	Kilcavan	Gorey
Knockmarshal	255	Bantry	St. John's	Enniscorthy
Knockmore	573	Bantry	Rossdroit	Enniscorthy
Knockmore	74	Shelmaliere East	Ardcolm	Wexford
Knockmullen	96	Gorey	Kilmakilloge	Gorey
Knockmullin	260	Bantry	St. Mary's	New Ross
Knocknagapple	173	Gorey	Kilnahue	Gorey
Knocknagross	122	Bantry	Clonmore	Enniscorthy
Knocknalour	453	Scarawalsh	Kilrush	Enniscorthy
Knocknamarshal	23	Shelmaliere West	Taghmon	Wexford
Knocknamota	261	Scarawalsh	Carnew	Gorey
Knocknasilloge	491	Ballaghkeen	Ballyvaldon	Enniscorthy
Knocknaskeagh	304	Gorey	Kilcormick	Enniscorthy
Knocknavey	246	Ballaghkeen	Killisk	Enniscorthy
Knocknell	14	Forth	Killinick	Wexford
Knocknoran	105	Bargy	Kilmore	Wexford
Knockrathkyle	77	Ballaghkeen	Ballyhuskard	Enniscorthy
Knockreagh	150	Scarawalsh	Ballycarney	Enniscorthy
Knockredmond	127	Bantry	Rossdroit	Enniscorthy
Knockrobin Lower	205	Scarawalsh	Toome	Gorey
Knockrobin Upper	250	Scarawalsh	Toome	Gorey
Knockroe	471	Bantry	Oldross	New Ross
Knockroe	89	Ballaghkeen	Ardamine	Gorey
Knockruth	72	Forth	Rathmacknee	Wexford
Knocks	108	Bargy	Tomhaggard	Wexford
Knockshaunfin	91	Scarawalsh	Carnew	Gorey
Knockskemolin	151	Ballaghkeen	Kilnamanagh	Gorey
Knockstown	558	Bantry	Killegney	Enniscorthy
Knocktarton	196	Shelmaliere West	Ballymitty	Wexford
Knocktown	226	Bargy	Duncormick	Wexford
Knottown	228	Shelmaliere East	Ardcavan	Wexford
Kyle	365	Scarawalsh	Templeshanbo	Enniscorthy
Kyle	296	Ballaghkeen	Meelnagh	Enniscorthy
Kyle Little	122	Ballaghkeen	Meelnagh	Enniscorthy
Kyle Lower	149	Shelmaliere East	Kilpatrick	Wexford
Kyle Middle	268	Shelmaliere East	Kilpatrick	Wexford
Kyle Upper	229	Shelmaliere East	Kilpatrick	Wexford
Lackan	112	Gorey	Kilmakilloge	Gorey
Lacken	1,112	Bantry	Oldross	New Ross
Lacken	309	Ballaghkeen	Kilmallock	Enniscorthy
Lacken	189	Bargy	Duncormick	Wexford
Lackendarragh	179	Scarawalsh	Kilrush	Enniscorthy
Ladys Island	30	Forth	Ladysisland	Wexford
Lake	143	Bargy	Mulrankin	Wexford
Lake Big	116	Forth	Rosslare	Wexford
Lake Little	41	Forth	Rosslare	Wexford
Lambertstown	83	Forth	Mayglass	Wexford
Lambstown	245	Shelburne	Templetown	New Ross
Lambstown Great	439	Bantry	Whitechurchglynn	Wexford
Lambstown Little	139	Bantry	Whitechurchglynn	Wexford
Landscape	160	Bantry	Whitechurch	New Ross
Lannagh	218	Bargy	Kilmore	Wexford
Laraheen	253	Gorey	Kilcavan	Gorey
Laraheenhill	144	Gorey	Kilcavan	Gorey
Larkinstown	87	Forth	St. Peters	Wexford
Latimerstown	129	Forth	Rathaspick	Wexford
Laurstown	169	Forth	St. Peters	Wexford
Leachestown	122	Forth	Mayglass	Wexford
Leegane	102	Shelmaliere West	Clongeen	New Ross
Legnaglogh	205	Ballaghkeen	Monamolin	Gorey
Levitstown	139	Bargy	Duncormick	Wexford
Levitstown	91	Forth	Drinagh	Wexford
Lewistown	209	Shelburne	Templetown	New Ross
Libgate	118	Bargy	Kilmore	Wexford
Limerick	172	Gorey	Kilcavan	Gorey
Ling, Ford of	45	Forth	Kilscoran	Wexford
Ling, Ford of	18	Forth	Ballybrennan	Wexford
Lingstown Lower	58	Forth	Ishartmon	Wexford
Lingstown Upper	72	Forth	Ishartmon	Wexford
Linnanagh	154	Gorey	Kilcavan	Gorey
Linziestown	102	Forth	Ishartmon	Wexford
Linziestown	69	Forth	Ballymore	Wexford
Litter Beg	124	Ballaghkeen	Kilmuckridge	Gorey
Litter More	122	Ballaghkeen	Kilmuckridge	Gorey
Little Island	10	Bargy	Kilcowan	Wexford
Littlebridge	87	Forth	Ballymore	Wexford
Littlebridge	21	Forth	Ishartmon	Wexford
Littletown	90	Bargy	Tomhaggard	Wexford
Lodgewood	246	Scarawalsh	Ferns	Enniscorthy
Loftusacre	2	Bargy	Bannow	Wexford
Loftushall	305	Shelburne	Hook	New Ross
Loggan Lower	401	Gorey	Crosspatrick	Gorey
Loggan Upper	748	Gorey	Crosspatrick	Gorey
Loginsherd	38	Forth	Carn	Wexford
Longgraigue	537	Shelmaliere West	Clongeen	New Ross
Longridge	68	Bargy	Kilcowan	Wexford
Lough	213	Bargy	Bannow	Wexford
Lough	163	Bargy	Duncormick	Wexford
Lough	64	Forth	Kilscoran	Wexford
Loughard	75	Forth	Ballybrennan	Wexford
Loughgerald	107	Bantry	Clonmore	Enniscorthy
Loughgunnen Great	137	Forth	Mayglass	Wexford
Loughgunnen Little	79	Forth	Mayglass	Wexford
Loughnageer	902	Shelmaliere West	Clongeen	New Ross
Lowlough	53	Ballaghkeen	Meelnagh	Enniscorthy
Lucas's Park	68	Bantry	St. John's	Enniscorthy
Lyrane	298	Gorey	Kilnahue	Gorey
Lyre	90	Scarawalsh	Monart	Enniscorthy
Mackenstown	13	Forth	Mayglass	Wexford
Mackmine	863	Shelmaliere West	Clonmore	Enniscorthy
Macmurroughs	162	Bantry	St. Mary's	New Ross
Macmurroughsisland	135	Bantry	St. Mary's	New Ross
Macoyle Lower	116	Gorey	Kilgorman	Gorey
Macoyle Upper	159	Gorey	Kilgorman	Gorey
Magmore	31	Ballaghkeen	Kilnamanagh	Gorey
Mahanagh	35	Ballaghkeen	Castle-ellis	Enniscorthy
Mandoran	488	Scarawalsh	St. Mary's, Newtownbarry	Enniscorthy
Mangan	786	Scarawalsh	Templeshanbo	Enniscorthy
Mangan	253	Gorey	Kilnahue	Gorey
Mangan	51	Gorey	Kiltrisk	Gorey
Mangan Lower	261	Ballaghkeen	Donaghmore	Gorey
Mangan Upper	128	Ballaghkeen	Donaghmore	Gorey
Marley	132	Scarawalsh	Monart	Enniscorthy
Marshalstown	695	Scarawalsh	Monart	Enniscorthy
Marshalstown	166	Shelmaliere West	Ballymitty	Wexford
Marshmeadows	160	Bantry	St. Mary's	New Ross
Martingale	120	Ballaghkeen	Ballynaslaney	Enniscorthy
Martinstown	48	Forth	Ballybrennan	Wexford
**Maudlins**	Town	Bantry	St. Mary's	New Ross
Maudlins	83	Bantry	St. Mary's	New Ross
Maudlintown	258	Bargy	Kilcavan	New Ross
Maudlintown	125	Forth	Maudlintown	Wexford
Mauritiustown	68	Forth	Rosslare	Wexford
Maxboley	187	Bargy	Ambrosetown	Wexford
Maytown	133	Forth	Rosslare	Wexford
Medophall	256	Scarawalsh	Toome	Gorey
Medophall Demesne	163	Scarawalsh	Toome	Gorey
Meelgarrow	254	Bantry	Templeludigan	New Ross
Meelnagh	11	Ballaghkeen	Meelnagh	Enniscorthy
Mersheen	243	Shelburne	St. James & Dunbrody	New Ross
Middletown	260	Ballaghkeen	Ballyhuskard	Enniscorthy
Middletown	177	Ballaghkeen	Ardamine	Gorey
Middletown	79	Forth	Mayglass	Wexford
Milehouse	246	Scarawalsh	Monart	Enniscorthy
Milestown	38	Forth	Rathmacknee	Wexford
Mill Lands	156	Ballaghkeen	Ballynaslaney	Enniscorthy
Mill Lands	137	Ballaghkeen	Kilmakilloge	Gorey
Millknock	46	Forth	Tacumshin	Wexford
Millquarter	647	Bantry	Oldross	New Ross
Millquarter	145	Gorey	Kilnahue	Gorey
Milltown	199	Scarawalsh	Kilbride	Enniscorthy
Milltown	161	Shelburne	Tintern	New Ross
Milltown	121	Forth	Kilscoran	Wexford
Milltown	118	Bantry	Killann	Enniscorthy
Milltown	87	Forth	Kildavin	Wexford
Milltown	30	Shelburne	Ballybrazil	New Ross
Milshoge	217	Scarawalsh	Toome	Gorey
Misterin	548	Bantry	Adamstown	New Ross
Mocurry East	243	Scarawalsh	Templeshanbo	Enniscorthy
Mocurry West	449	Scarawalsh	Templeshanbo	Enniscorthy
Moddybeg	45	Shelmaliere West	Taghmon	Wexford
Monacahee	303	Shelburne	Rathroe	New Ross
Monagarrow Little	71	Gorey	Kilgorman	Gorey
Monagarrow Lower	195	Gorey	Kilgorman	Gorey
Monagarrow Upper	182	Gorey	Kilgorman	Gorey
Monagear	196	Scarawalsh	Clone	Enniscorthy
Monagreany Lower	306	Gorey	Monamolin	Gorey
Monagreany Upper	352	Gorey	Monamolin	Gorey
Monalee	390	Scarawalsh	Templeshanbo	Enniscorthy
Monalee	256	Gorey	Kilnenor	Gorey
Monaleehill	434	Gorey	Kilnenor	Gorey
Monalug	75	Gorey	Kilgorman	Gorey
**Monamolin**	Town	Ballaghkeen	Monamolin	Gorey
Monamolin	714	Bantry	Templeludigan	New Ross
Monanarrig	289	Ballaghkeen	Ballyvaldon	Enniscorthy
Monareagh	95	Gorey	Inch	Gorey
Monart East	836	Scarawalsh	Monart	Enniscorthy
Monart West	252	Scarawalsh	Monart	Enniscorthy
Monaseed	143	Gorey	Kilnahue	Gorey
Monaseed Demesne	267	Gorey	Kilnahue	Gorey
Monasootagh	793	Scarawalsh	Kilcomb	Gorey
Monature	232	Gorey	Inch	Gorey
Monavoddagh	49	Ballaghkeen	Ballynaslaney	Enniscorthy
Monawilling Lower	254	Ballaghkeen	Kilcormick	Enniscorthy
Monawilling Upper	223	Ballaghkeen	Kilcormick	Enniscorthy
Monbay Lower	283	Gorey	Rossminoge	Gorey
Monbay Upper	281	Gorey	Rossminoge	Gorey
Monbeg	595	Scarawalsh	Templeshanbo	Enniscorthy
Mondaniel	197	Ballaghkeen	Ballyhuskard	Enniscorthy
Money	698	Scarawalsh	Carnew	Gorey
Moneyboe	210	Ballaghkeen	Meelnagh	Gorey
Moneycross Lower	164	Gorey	Liskinfere	Gorey
Moneycross Upper	196	Gorey	Liskinfere	Gorey
Moneydurtlow	306	Scarawalsh	Kilrush	Enniscorthy
Moneyheer	291	Bantry	St. John's	Enniscorthy
Moneyhore	323	Bantry	Rossdroit	Enniscorthy
Moneylawn Lower	161	Gorey	Liskinfere	Gorey
Moneylawn Upper	173	Gorey	Liskinfere	Gorey
Moneynamough	391	Bantry	Templeludigan	New Ross
Moneyribbin	198	Gorey	Inch	Gorey
Moneytucker	711	Bantry	Rossdroit	Enniscorthy
Monfin	206	Bantry	St. John's	Enniscorthy
Mongaun	109	Shelmaliere West	Taghmon	Wexford
Monglass	382	Scarawalsh	Monart	Enniscorthy
Monmore	319	Shelmaliere East	Artramon	Wexford
Monmore	181	Ballaghkeen	Donaghmore	Gorey
Monmore	41	Shelmaliere East	Kilpatrick	Wexford
Monroe	266	Ballaghkeen	Edermine	Enniscorthy
Monroe	160	Gorey	Ballycanew	Gorey
Monroe	155	Ballaghkeen	Killisk	Enniscorthy
Monroe	10	Shelmaliere East	Ardcavan	Wexford
Moor	156	Bargy	Mulrankin	Wexford
Moor	136	Ballaghkeen	Ardamine	Gorey
Moorfields	388	Bantry	Oldross	New Ross
Moorfields	99	Forth	Rathaspick	Wexford
Moortown	67	Forth	Mayglass	Wexford
Moortown	15	Forth	Carn	Wexford
Moortown Great	292	Bargy	Ambrosetown	Wexford
Moortown Great	232	Bargy	Tomhaggard	Wexford
Moortown Little	258	Bargy	Ambrosetown	Wexford
Moortown Little	119	Bargy	Tomhaggard	Wexford
Morriscastle	246	Ballaghkeen	Kilmuckridge	Gorey
Morrissysland	26	Bantry	St. Mary's	New Ross
Motabeg (or Salville)	140	Ballaghkeen	Templeshannon	Enniscorthy
Motabower	325	Gorey	Carnew	Shillelagh
Mountaingate	64	Bargy	Kilmannan	Wexford
Mountainmuck	252	Bantry	Whitechurchglynn	Wexford
Mountalexander	299	Ballaghkeen	Kiltennell	Gorey
Mountanna	86	Shelmaliere East	Kilpatrick	Wexford
Mountcross	41	Bargy	Mulrankin	Wexford
Mountelliott	469	Bantry	St. Mary's	New Ross
Mountfin Lower (or Ballinturner)	437	Scarawalsh	Ballycarney	Enniscorthy
Mountfin Upper	345	Scarawalsh	Ballycarney	Enniscorthy
Mountforest	164	Gorey	Liskinfere	Gorey
Mountgarrett	86	Bantry	St. Mary's	New Ross
Mountgeorge	158	Gorey	Kilcormick	Enniscorthy
Mounthanover	136	Bantry	Ballyanne	New Ross
Mounthoward Lower	435	Gorey	Monamolin	Gorey
Mounthoward Upper	200	Gorey	Monamolin	Gorey
Mountnebo	304	Gorey	Kilnahue	Gorey
Mountpill	173	Bargy	Tomhaggard	Wexford
Mountpill Burrow	29	Bargy	Tomhaggard	Wexford
Mountpleasant (or Tagunnan)	190	Forth	Mayglass	Wexford
Mountseaton	83	Scarawalsh	Kilbride	Enniscorthy
Moyeady	90	Scarawalsh	St. Mary's, Newtownbarry	Enniscorthy
Moyne Lower	261	Scarawalsh	St. Mary's, Enniscorthy	Enniscorthy
Moyne Middle	238	Scarawalsh	St. Mary's, Enniscorthy	Enniscorthy
Moyne Upper	200	Scarawalsh	St. Mary's, Enniscorthy	Enniscorthy
Muchknock	21	Forth	Killinick	Wexford
Muchrath	79	Forth	Killinick	Wexford
Muchtown	68	Bargy	Kilcowan	Wexford
Muchwood	145	Shelmaliere West	Ardcandrisk	Wexford
Mucklow	151	Ballaghkeen	Kiltennell	Gorey
Muckranstown	44	Forth	Kilscoran	Wexford
Muckstown	46	Forth	Tacumshin	Wexford
Mulgannon	210	Forth	Maudlintown	Wexford
Mullaghdarrig	63	Ballaghkeen	Kilmallock	Enniscorthy
Mullanagower	186	Shelmaliere East	Ardcavan	Wexford
Mullanour	135	Forth	Rathaspick	Wexford
Mullaun	230	Gorey	Kilnenor	Gorey
Mullaun	75	Ballaghkeen	Edermine	Enniscorthy
Mullaunfin	100	Gorey	Kilnahue	Gorey
Mullaunnasmear	327	Scarawalsh	St. Mary's, Newtownbarry	Enniscorthy
Mullaunreagh	335	Gorey	Monamolin	Gorey
Mullinderry	90	Shelmaliere West	Inch	New Ross
Mullinnagore (or Oilgate)	104	Ballaghkeen	Edermine	Enniscorthy
Mullinree	26	Shelmaliere West	Kilbrideglynn	Wexford
Mulmontry	247	Shelmaliere West	Taghmon	Wexford
Mulrankin	291	Bargy	Mulrankin	Wexford
Murntown	133	Shelmaliere West	Kilbrideglynn	Wexford
Murntown Lower	123	Forth	Kildavin	Wexford
Murntown Upper	82	Forth	Kildavin	Wexford
Myaugh	249	Gorey	Kilcormick	Enniscorthy
Myaugh	79	Scarawalsh	Clone	Enniscorthy
Mylerspark	881	Bantry	Oldross	New Ross
Nash	1,152	Shelburne	Owenduff	New Ross
Nemestown	246	Bargy	Kilmore	Wexford
Nethertown	99	Forth	Carn	Wexford
Nevillescourt	121	Gorey	Ballycanew	Gorey
**New Ross**	Town	Bantry	St. Mary's	New Ross
Newbawn	1,124	Shelmaliere West	Newbawn	New Ross
Newbay	138	Forth	St. Peter's	Wexford
Newbridge	183	Gorey	Toome	Gorey
Newcastle	845	Shelmaliere West	Clongeen	New Ross
Newcastle	237	Bargy	Kilmannan	Wexford
Newcastle	102	Shelmaliere East	Kilpatrick	Wexford
Newcastle Lower	72	Shelmaliere East	Tikillin	Wexford
Newcastle Upper	208	Shelmaliere East	Tikillin	Wexford
Newfort	195	Ballaghkeen	Castle-ellis	Enniscorthy
Newhouse	202	Bargy	Kilcowan	Wexford
Newhouse	48	Forth	Ballymore	Wexford
Newhouses	55	Forth	Kilrane	Wexford
Newhouses	46	Forth	St. Helen's	Wexford
Newross	102	Bantry	St. Mary's	New Ross
Newtown	545	Bantry	Killann	Enniscorthy
Newtown	453	Bargy	Bannow	Wexford
Newtown	422	Scarawalsh	Monart	Enniscorthy
Newtown	345	Bantry	Adamstown	New Ross
Newtown	342	Shelmaliere West	Carrick	Wexford
Newtown	247	Scarawalsh	Ferns	Enniscorthy
Newtown	245	Bargy	Taghmon	Wexford
Newtown	205	Ballaghkeen	Kilmuckridge	Gorey
Newtown	201	Ballaghkeen	Donaghmore	Gorey
Newtown	122	Bargy	Kilturk	Wexford
Newtown	114	Bargy	Kilmore	Wexford
Newtown	94	Forth	Kilscoran	Wexford
Newtown	82	Forth	Rathmacknee	Wexford
Newtown	59	Bargy	Killag	Wexford
Newtown	34	Forth	St. Peter's	Wexford
Newtown (or Commons)	698	Bantry	St. Mary's	New Ross
Newtown Big	170	Bargy	Kilcowan	Wexford
Newtown Little	63	Bargy	Kilcowan	Wexford
Newtown Lower	251	Gorey	Inch	Gorey
Newtown Lower	130	Shelmaliere East	Tikillin	Wexford
Newtown Upper	157	Gorey	Inch	Gorey
Newtown Upper	74	Shelmaliere East	Tikillin	Wexford
**Newtownbarry**	Town	Scarawalsh	St. Mary's, Newtownbarry	Enniscorthy
Newtownbarry	329	Scarawalsh	St. Mary's, Newtownbarry	Enniscorthy
Nicharee	183	Bargy	Duncormick	Wexford
Nineacres	20	Forth	Carn	Wexford
Nineteenacres	31	Forth	Carn	Wexford
Nook	517	Shelburne	St. James & Dunbrody	New Ross
Norrismount	279	Scarawalsh	Toome	Gorey
Norristown	197	Bargy	Kilmannan	Wexford
Oaklands	171	Bantry	St. Mary's	New Ross
**Oilgate**	Town	Ballaghkeen	Edermine	Enniscorthy
Oilgate (or Mullinnagore)	101	Ballaghkeen	Edermine	Enniscorthy
Oldboley	326	Shelmaliere West	Taghmon	Wexford
Oldcourt	719	Bantry	Adamstown	New Ross
Oldcourt	491	Shelburne	Whitechurch	New Ross
Oldhall	89	Bargy	Mulrankin	Wexford
Oldmill	18	Forth	Kilrane	Wexford
Oldtown	148	Ballaghkeen	Donaghmore	Gorey
Oldtown	94	Shelmaliere East	Ardcolm	Wexford
Oldtown	34	Bargy	Tomhaggard	Wexford
Oldtown Curralane	145	Scarawalsh	Kilrush	Enniscorthy
Orristown	235	Forth	Kilmacree	Wexford
**Oulart**	Town	Ballaghkeen	Meelnagh	Enniscorthy
Oulart	404	Ballaghkeen	Meelnagh	Enniscorthy
Oulart	278	Gorey	Kilnenor	Gorey
Oulartard	327	Scarawalsh	Clone	Enniscorthy
Oulartleigh	296	Ballaghkeen	Ballyhuskard	Enniscorthy
Oulartwick Beg	112	Ballaghkeen	Kilcormick	Enniscorthy
Oulartwick More	210	Ballaghkeen	Kilcormick	Enniscorthy
Owenstown	98	Forth	Rathmacknee	Wexford
Palace East	195	Bantry	Oldross	New Ross
Palace West	353	Bantry	Oldross	New Ross
Pallis Lower	340	Gorey	Kilnenor	Gorey
Pallis Upper	279	Gorey	Kilnenor	Gorey
Pallishill	211	Gorey	Kilnenor	Gorey
Paradise	56	Forth	Ishartmon	Wexford
Paradise Little	4	Forth	Ishartmon	Wexford
Park	323	Bantry	Clonmore	Enniscorthy
Park	249	Shelmaliere West	Carrick	Wexford
Park	246	Scarawalsh	Carnew	Gorey
Park	45	Bargy	Killag	Wexford
Parkannesley Lower	271	Ballaghkeen	Donaghmore	Gorey
Parkannesley Upper	182	Ballaghkeen	Donaghmore	Gorey
Parkbaun	121	Gorey	Kilcavan	Gorey
Parknacross	146	Ballaghkeen	Ardamine	Gorey
Parknashoge	199	Ballaghkeen	Killenagh	Gorey
Pembrokestown	133	Bargy	Killag	Wexford
Pembrokestown	96	Forth	Maudlintown	Wexford
Peppardscastle	392	Ballaghkeen	Donaghmore	Gorey
Perrymount	98	Gorey	Inch	Gorey
Petitstown	72	Forth	Mayglass	Wexford
Philippintown	143	Bargy	Ballyconnick	Wexford
Piercetown	92	Forth	Rathmacknee	Wexford
Pigott's (or Tanyard)	80	Bantry	St. Mary's	New Ross
Plattinstown	113	Gorey	Inch	Gorey
Plot	67	Bargy	Kilmannan	Wexford
Pludboher	23	Bargy	Tomhaggard	Wexford
Polchore	335	Shelmaliere West	Ardcandrisk	Wexford
Pollbrean	73	Forth	Drinagh	Wexford
Polldarrig	163	Shelmaliere East	Ballynaslaney	Enniscorthy
Polldoon	165	Shelmaliere West	Ballylannan	New Ross
Pollmanagh Great	135	Bargy	Kilmannan	Wexford
Pollmanagh Little	73	Bargy	Kilmannan	Wexford
Pollpeasty	361	Bantry	Killegney	Enniscorthy
Pollrane	142	Bargy	Kilturk	Wexford
Pollrankin	126	Forth	St. Michael's	Wexford
Pollregan	155	Shelmaliere East	Ardcolm	Wexford
Pollsallagh	182	Forth	Rathmacknee	Wexford
Pollwitch	20	Forth	Mayglass	Wexford
Pondfields	12	Bantry	St. Mary's	New Ross
Poplar	12	Shelmaliere East	Artramon	Wexford
Portersgate	174	Shelburne	Hook	New Ross
Portersland	81	Bantry	St. Mary's	New Ross
Poulmaloe	243	Shelburne	Whitechurch	New Ross
Poulmari	293	Shelmaliere West	Taghmon	Wexford
Poulpeasty	308	Bantry	Whitechurchglynn	Wexford
Priesthaggard	249	Shelburne	Kilmokea	New Ross
Primestown	4	Forth	Tacumshin	Wexford
Prospect	342	Ballaghkeen	Kiltennell	Gorey
Prospect (or Coolmela)	1,059	Scarawalsh	Moyacomb	Shillelagh
Pullingtown	99	Bargy	Kilmore	Wexford
Pullingtown	22	Forth	Carn	Wexford
Pullinstown Big	171	Scarawalsh	Monart	Enniscorthy
Pullinstown Little	161	Scarawalsh	Monart	Enniscorthy
Quanstown	96	Forth	Rathaspick	Wexford
Quarry	130	Scarawalsh	Kilbride	Enniscorthy
Quitchery Great	155	Bargy	Kilcavan	Wexford
Quitchery Little	106	Bargy	Kilcavan	Wexford
Racecourse	133	Gorey	Kilnahue	Gorey
Racecourse	53	Forth	St. Iberius	Wexford
Rahale	137	Ballaghkeen	Ballynaslaney	Enniscorthy
Rahard	149	Bantry	Whitechurchglynn	Wexford
Raheen	515	Scarawalsh	Kilcomb	Gorey
Raheen	494	Bantry	Chapel	Enniscorthy
Raheen	458	Scarawalsh	Kilrush	Enniscorthy
Raheen	284	Ballaghkeen	Killenagh	Gorey
Raheen	205	Shelmaliere West	Taghmon	Wexford
Raheen Beg	133	Ballaghkeen	Killenagh	Gorey
Raheen Moor	244	Ballaghkeen	Killenagh	Gorey
Raheen More	169	Ballaghkeen	Killenagh	Gorey
Raheenaclonagh	692	Bantry	Newbawn	New Ross
Raheenagurren East	187	Ballaghkeen	Kilmakilloge	Gorey
Raheenagurren West	248	Ballaghkeen	Kilmakilloge	Gorey
Raheenahennedy	306	Bantry	Newbawn	New Ross
Raheenarostia (or Rochestown)	149	Bantry	Newbawn	New Ross
Raheendarrig	367	Ballaghkeen	Monamolin	Gorey
Raheenduff	644	Bantry	Adamstown	New Ross
Raheenduff	396	Ballaghkeen	Kilcormick	Gorey
Raheenduff	368	Shelmaliere West	Horetown	New Ross
Raheenlusk	231	Ballaghkeen	Donaghmore	Gorey
Raheenmoor	67	Forth	Carn	Wexford
Raheennagee	91	Scarawalsh	Ferns	Enniscorthy
Raheennahoon	300	Bantry	Kilcowanmore	Enniscorthy
Raheennaskeagh Lower	259	Ballaghkeen	Kilnamanagh	Gorey
Raheennaskeagh Upper	166	Ballaghkeen	Kilnamanagh	Gorey
Raheenpark	135	Ballaghkeen	Killenagh	Gorey
Raheevarren	503	Shelmaliere West	Newbawn	New Ross
Ralph	288	Shelburne	Fethard	New Ross
Ralphtown	162	Bargy	Kilcowan	Wexford
Ramsfortpark (or Ballowen)	324	Gorey	Kilmakilloge	Gorey
**Ramsgrange**	Town	Shelburne	St. James & Dunbrody	New Ross
Ramsgrange	1,230	Shelburne	St. James & Dunbrody	New Ross
Ramstown	521	Shelburne	Fethard	New Ross
Ramstown Lower	200	Gorey	Kilmakilloge	Gorey
Ramstown Upper	220	Gorey	Kilmakilloge	Gorey
Randallsmill	90	Shelmaliere East	Tikillin	Wexford
Randalstown	206	Forth	Mayglass	Wexford
Rath	140	Bargy	Duncormick	Wexford
Rathangan	461	Bargy	Duncormick	Wexford
Rathaspick	216	Forth	Rathaspick	Wexford
Rathdowney	77	Forth	St. Michael's	Wexford
Rathdowney	62	Forth	Ladysisland	Wexford
Rathdowney	43	Forth	Ballybrennan	Wexford
Rathduff	517	Bantry	Killann	Enniscorthy
Rathfylane	349	Bantry	Rossdroit	Enniscorthy
Rathgaroge	494	Bantry	Ballyanne	New Ross
Rathjarney	126	Forth	Rathmacknee	Wexford
Rathkyle	474	Shelmaliere West	Kilgarvan	New Ross
Rathlannon	263	Forth	Kildavin	Wexford
Rathmacknee Great	167	Forth	Rathmacknee	Wexford
Rathmacknee Little	108	Forth	Rathmacknee	Wexford
Rathmore	121	Forth	St. Iberius	Wexford
Rathnageeragh	468	Shelburne	Owenduff	New Ross
Rathnedan	71	Forth	Ballymore	Wexford
Rathnure	265	Bantry	Rossdroit	Enniscorthy
Rathnure Lower	477	Bantry	Killann	Enniscorthy
Rathnure Upper	382	Bantry	Killann	Enniscorthy
Ratholm	97	Forth	Ballybrennan	Wexford
Rathphaudin	545	Bantry	Templeludigan	New Ross
Rathpierce Hill	315	Gorey	Kilnenor	Gorey
Rathpierce Lower	169	Gorey	Kilnenor	Gorey
Rathpierce Upper	235	Gorey	Kilnenor	Gorey
Rathrolan	67	Forth	Tacumshin	Wexford
Rathrolan	13	Forth	Ballymore	Wexford
Rathronan	207	Bargy	Mulrankin	Wexford
Rathshillane	101	Forth	Tacumshin	Wexford
Rathsillagh	466	Shelmaliere West	Kilgarvan	New Ross
Rathturtin	1,007	Bantry	Killegney	Enniscorthy
Rathumney	1,152	Shelburne	Owenduff	New Ross
Rathyark	160	Bargy	Mulrankin	Wexford
Reahouse	149	Bargy	Killag	Wexford
Reddina	206	Shelmaliere West	Killurin	Enniscorthy
Reddysland	18	Bantry	St. Mary's	New Ross
Redhouse	93	Bantry	St. Mary's	New Ross
Redmondstown	201	Shelmaliere East	Ballynaslaney	Enniscorthy
Redmondstown	131	Forth	Rathaspick	Wexford
Redmoor	219	Bargy	Killag	Wexford
Reedstown	160	Forth	Tacumshin	Wexford
Regan	116	Bargy	Kilmannan	Wexford
Richfield	247	Bargy	Killag	Wexford
Rickardstown	154	Bargy	Kilmore	Wexford
Riesk	120	Ballaghkeen	Killila	Enniscorthy
Riesk	28	Bargy	Killag	Wexford
Riesk	3	Ballaghkeen	Castle-ellis	Enniscorthy
Ring	137	Forth	Carn	Wexford
Ring	67	Forth	Tacumshin	Wexford
Ring	36	Forth	Ishartmon	Wexford
Ring Green	44	Forth	Carn	Wexford
Ring Little	20	Forth	Carn	Wexford
Ringaheen	79	Forth	Rathmacknee	Wexford
Ringbaun	121	Bargy	Kilturk	Wexford
Ringbaun Burrow	29	Bargy	Kilturk	Wexford
Ringknock	35	Forth	Tacumshin	Wexford
Ringsherane	31	Forth	Carn	Wexford
Riscrann	23	Forth	St. Helen's	Wexford
**Riverchapel**	Town	Ballaghkeen	Ardamine	Gorey
Riverstown	94	Bargy	Killag	Wexford
Riverview	100	Ballaghkeen	Edermine	Enniscorthy
Robinstown	325	Bargy	Duncormick	Wexford
Robinstown Great	661	Bantry	Oldross	New Ross
Robinstown Little	341	Bantry	Oldross	New Ross
Rochestown	685	Bantry	Oldross	New Ross
Rochestown	504	Bargy	Taghmon	Wexford
Rochestown	228	Shelmaliere West	Ballylannan	New Ross
Rochestown	140	Bargy	Duncormick	Wexford
Rochestown	89	Forth	Drinagh	Wexford
Rochestown (or Raheenarostia)	149	Bantry	Newbawn	New Ross
Rock of Ballingly	111	Bargy	Kilcavan	Wexford
Rocksborough	178	Forth	Maudlintown	Wexford
Rockspring	178	Scarawalsh	Kilbride	Enniscorthy
Roperstown	100	Ballaghkeen	Edermine	Enniscorthy
Rosegarland	752	Shelmaliere West	Ballylannan	New Ross
Rosehill	33	Forth	Rosslare	Wexford
Roseland	15	Forth	Kildavin	Wexford
Rosemaryhill	80	Scarawalsh	Ferns	Enniscorthy
Rosetown	517	Shelburne	St. James & Dunbrody	New Ross
Rosetown	71	Forth	Rosslare	Wexford
Rossard	900	Scarawalsh	Templeshanbo	Enniscorthy
Rosslarefort	17	Forth	Rosslare	Wexford
Rossminoge North	298	Gorey	Rossminoge	Gorey
Rossminoge South	238	Gorey	Rossminoge	Gorey
Rosspile	445	Shelmaliere West	Ballylannan	New Ross
Rostonstown	70	Forth	Tacumshin	Wexford
Rostonstown Burrow	65	Forth	Tacumshin	Wexford
Roughmead	8	Forth	Drinagh	Wexford
Rowestown	180	Shelmaliere West	Kilbrideglynn	Wexford
Rowestown	124	Forth	Drinagh	Wexford
Ruaunmore	238	Ballaghkeen	Killincooly	Gorey
Russellstown	179	Bargy	Kilcowan	Wexford
Ryane	255	Ballaghkeen	Edermine	Enniscorthy
Ryland Lower	428	Scarawalsh	St. Mary's, Newtownbarry	Enniscorthy
Ryland Upper	487	Scarawalsh	St. Mary's, Newtownbarry	Enniscorthy
Ryleen	521	Bantry	St. Mary's	New Ross
Saintjohns	325	Bantry	St. John's	Enniscorthy
Saintkierans	469	Shelburne	Tintern	New Ross
Saintleonards	438	Shelburne	Tintern	New Ross
Sallystown	152	Forth	Kildavin	Wexford
Saltee Island Great	215	Bargy	Kilmore	Wexford
Saltee Island Little	93	Bargy	Kilmore	Wexford
**Saltmills**	Town	Shelburne	Tintern	New Ross
Saltmills	320	Shelburne	St. James & Dunbrody	New Ross
Saltmills	272	Shelburne	Tintern	New Ross
Salville (or Motabeg)	140	Ballaghkeen	Templeshannon	Enniscorthy
Sanctuary	13	Forth	Killinick	Wexford
Sarshill	184	Bargy	Kilmore	Wexford
Saunderscourt	440	Shelmaliere East	Kilpatrick	Wexford
Scar	393	Bargy	Duncormick	Wexford
Scarawalsh	496	Scarawalsh	Ballycarney	Enniscorthy
Scark	210	Bantry	Ballyanne	New Ross
Scarnagh Lower	317	Gorey	Inch	Gorey
Scarnagh Upper	222	Gorey	Inch	Gorey
Scaughmolin	105	Forth	Rathaspick	Wexford
Scollagh	129	Ballaghkeen	Kilcormick	Enniscorthy
Scotsland	74	Bargy	Duncormick	Wexford
Scullaboge	789	Shelmaliere West	Newbawn	New Ross
Scurlocksbush	139	Ballaghkeen	Edermine	Enniscorthy
Scurlogebush	339	Bargy	Duncormick	Wexford
Sea, Hill of	89	Forth	Rosslare	Wexford
Seafield	126	Ballaghkeen	Kiltennell	Gorey
Seafield	66	Bargy	Duncormick	Wexford
Seamount	127	Ballaghkeen	Ardamine	Gorey
Seaview	178	Ballaghkeen	Donaghmore	Gorey
Shallowspark	46	Bantry	St. Mary's	New Ross
Shanacloon	61	Shelburne	St. James & Dunbrody	New Ross
Shanahona	210	Shelmaliere West	Killurin	Wexford
Shanoo	111	Bargy	Kilcowan	Wexford
Shanowle	630	Shelmaliere West	Horetown	New Ross
Shawstown	147	Shelmaliere West	Horetown	New Ross
Sheastown	180	Bargy	Kilcavan	Wexford
Sheephouse	92	Bargy	Mulrankin	Wexford
Sheepwalk	147	Forth	Killiane	Wexford
Shelbaggan	1,151	Shelburne	Rathroe	New Ross
Shelmaliere Commons	760	Shelmaliere West	Kilbrideglynn	Wexford
Shelmaliere Commons	606	Shelmaliere West	Taghmon	Wexford
Shelmaliere Commons	393	Shelmaliere West	Carrick	Wexford
Sherwood	47	Forth	Mayglass	Wexford
Shilbrack	11	Forth	Carn	Wexford
Shilmaine	171	Forth	Kilscoran	Wexford
Shilmore	57	Forth	Carn	Wexford
Shingaun	72	Scarawalsh	Monart	Enniscorthy
Shirsheen	170	Gorey	Inch	Gorey
Shortalstown	113	Forth	Rathmacknee	Wexford
Shouks	27	Bargy	Mulrankin	Wexford
Shrule	261	Gorey	Rossminoge	Gorey
Shrule	119	Scarawalsh	Kilcomb	Gorey
Shrule	109	Ballaghkeen	Donaghmore	Gorey
Sigginstown	197	Forth	Tacumshin	Wexford
Sigginstown	24	Forth	Ishartmon	Wexford
Sigginstown Island Great	24	Forth	Tacumshin	Wexford
Sigginstown Island Little	1	Forth	Tacumshin	Wexford
Siginshaggard	260	Shelmaliere West	Coolstuff	Wexford
Silverspring	166	Forth	Mayglass	Wexford
Sinnottsmill	60	Shelmaliere East	Ardcavan	Wexford
Sinnottstown	159	Forth	Drinagh	Wexford
Sion	102	Shelmaliere East	Kilpatrick	Wexford
Sixacre	13	Forth	Rosslare	Wexford
Skeahanagh (or Farmley)	330	Scarawalsh	Ballycarney	Enniscorthy
Skeaterpark	102	Bargy	Kilmannan	Wexford
Skinnew	248	Gorey	Monamolin	Gorey
Slad	123	Forth	Kilscoran	Wexford
**Slade**	Town	Shelburne	Hook	New Ross
Slade	241	Shelburne	Hook	New Ross
Slaght	213	Bantry	Oldross	New Ross
Sleedagh	284	Bargy	Kilmannan	Wexford
Slevoy	626	Shelmaliere West	Taghmon	Wexford
Slievebaun	204	Gorey	Kilnahue	Gorey
Slievebaun	161	Bantry	Killann	Enniscorthy
Slievecoiltia Commons	183	Shelburne	Whitechurch	New Ross
Slievegar	235	Scarawalsh	Templeshanbo	Enniscorthy
Slievenagorea	239	Ballaghkeen	Ballyhuskard	Enniscorthy
Slievenagrane	341	Ballaghkeen	Castle-ellis	Enniscorthy
Slipperygreen	30	Forth	St. Peter's	Wexford
Solsborough	265	Scarawalsh	Clone	Enniscorthy
Soughane	162	Bargy	Kilturk	Wexford
Southknock	116	Bantry	St. Mary's	New Ross
Sparrowsland	185	Bantry	Kilcowanmore	Enniscorthy
Sparrowsland	84	Bantry	Clonmore	Enniscorthy
Spelsherstown	81	Bargy	Kilmannan	Wexford
Springmount	460	Bantry	Killann	Enniscorthy
Springpark	531	Bantry	Oldross	New Ross
Springvale (or Glennameenagh)	283	Scarawalsh	Ballycarney	Enniscorthy
Sroughmore	310	Scarawalsh	Templeshanbo	Enniscorthy
Sroughmore	186	Scarawalsh	Monart	Enniscorthy
St Awries	6	Forth	Ladysisland	Wexford
St Edmonds	88	Shelmaliere East	Artramon	Wexford
St Helens	22	Forth	St. Helen's	Wexford
St Iberius	32	Forth	St. Iberius	Wexford
St Margarets	170	Forth	St. Margaret's	Wexford
St Tenants	189	Bargy	Ballyconnick	Wexford
St. Vogues'	25	Forth	Carn	Wexford
Stable	185	Ballaghkeen	Donaghmore	Gorey
Staplestown	20	Forth	Ballymore	Wexford
Staplestown (Greaves)	208	Forth	Kildavin	Wexford
Staplestown (Morgan)	90	Forth	Kildavin	Wexford
Staplestown (Ram)	61	Forth	Kildavin	Wexford
Starvehall	117	Forth	Rathaspick	Wexford
Stephen Land	21	Bantry	St. Mary's	New Ross
Stephenstown	71	Forth	Kilmacree	Wexford
Stokestown	604	Bantry	Whitechurch	New Ross
Stonehouse	172	Shelburne	Fethard	New Ross
Stonepark	91	Bantry	Clonmore	Enniscorthy
Stonybatter	40	Shelmaliere West	Carrick	Wexford
Stonyford	78	Forth	Kilscoran	Wexford
Strahart	171	Scarawalsh	Ballycarney	Enniscorthy
Stranfield	58	Forth	Kerloge	Wexford
Streamstown	70	Forth	Rosslare	Wexford
Summerstown	29	Forth	Carn	Wexford
Summertown	61	Forth	St. Margaret's	Wexford
Sweetfarm	161	Bantry	St. John's	Enniscorthy
Tacumshin	211	Forth	Tacumshin	Wexford
**Taghmon**	Town	Shelmaliere West	Taghmon	Wexford
Taghmon	252	Shelmaliere West	Taghmon	Wexford
Tagunnan (or Mountpleasant)	190	Forth	Mayglass	Wexford
Talbotstown	97	Forth	Kilmacree	Wexford
Tanyard (or Pigotts)	80	Bantry	St. Mary's	New Ross
Tarahill	296	Ballaghkeen	Kilcavan	Gorey
Tarahill	152	Ballaghkeen	Kiltennell	Gorey
Taulaght	240	Shelburne	Tintern	New Ross
Taylorstown	441	Shelburne	Tintern	New Ross
Tedwards	15	Forth	Carn	Wexford
Tellarought	1,176	Shelburne	Tellarought	New Ross
Templederry	174	Ballaghkeen	Donaghmore	Gorey
Templeludigan	1,108	Bantry	Templeludigan	New Ross
Templenacroha	848	Bantry	Adamstown	New Ross
Templescoby	855	Bantry	Templescoby	Enniscorthy
Templeshannon	332	Ballaghkeen	Templeshannon	Enniscorthy
Templeshelin	790	Bantry	Adamstown	New Ross
Templetown	689	Shelburne	Templetown	New Ross
Tenacre	123	Forth	Kilrane	Wexford
Tenacre	27	Bargy	Tomhaggard	Wexford
Tenchspit	122	Forth	Rathaspick	Wexford
The Raven	550	Shelmaliere East	St. Margaret's	Wexford
The Ridge	4	Shelmaliere East	St. Margaret's	Wexford
Theoil	122	Ballaghkeen	Ballynaslaney	Enniscorthy
Theoil	24	Ballaghkeen	Edermine	Enniscorthy
Threeacres	12	Forth	Carn	Wexford
Tikillin	288	Shelmaliere East	Tikillin	Wexford
Tiknock	277	Ballaghkeen	Kilcormick	Enniscorthy
Tilladavin	163	Bargy	Tomhaggard	Wexford
Tincome	48	Shelmaliere East	Ardcavan	Wexford
Tincoon	218	Ballaghkeen	Edermine	Enniscorthy
Tincurra	434	Shelmaliere West	Taghmon	Wexford
Tincurragh	67	Gorey	Kilcavan	Gorey
Tincurragh	30	Gorey	Kilgorman	Gorey
Tincurry	1,015	Scarawalsh	Ballycarney	Enniscorthy
Ting	94	Forth	Rathmacknee	Wexford
Tingar	127	Ballaghkeen	Donaghmore	Gorey
Tinnabaun	299	Gorey	Kilnenor	Gorey
Tinnaberna	163	Ballaghkeen	Killincooly	Enniscorthy
Tinnacarrick	849	Shelburne	Owenduff	New Ross
Tinnacree	233	Ballaghkeen	Kilmuckridge	Gorey
Tinnacross	367	Scarawalsh	Clone	Enniscorthy
Tinnahask	135	Ballaghkeen	Ballynaslaney	Enniscorthy
Tinnakilla	325	Shelmaliere West	Killurin	Enniscorthy
Tinnarath	256	Shelmaliere West	Inch	New Ross
Tinnashinnagh	170	Gorey	Kilmakilloge	Gorey
Tinnashrule	394	Scarawalsh	Ferns	Enniscorthy
Tinnick	46	Ballaghkeen	Ballyvaldon	Enniscorthy
Tinnock	528	Shelburne	Killesk	New Ross
Tinnock Lower	336	Gorey	Kilcavan	Gorey
Tinnock Upper	183	Gorey	Kilcavan	Gorey
Tinraheen	486	Ballaghkeen	Killisk	Enniscorthy
Tintern	600	Shelburne	Tintern	New Ross
Tinteskin	128	Ballaghkeen	Killincooly	Gorey
Toberanierin Lower	257	Gorey	Liskinfere	Gorey
Toberanierin Upper	193	Gorey	Liskinfere	Gorey
Toberbeg	49	Ballaghkeen	Killisk	Enniscorthy
Toberbeg	2	Ballaghkeen	Castle-ellis	Enniscorthy
Toberduff	176	Gorey	Kilcavan	Gorey
Toberfal	375	Gorey	Kilcormick	Enniscorthy
Toberfinnick	120	Shelmaliere East	Artramon	Wexford
Toberlomina	270	Ballaghkeen	Meelnagh	Enniscorthy
Toberona	209	Bantry	Templescoby	Enniscorthy
Tomacurry	397	Scarawalsh	Monart	Enniscorthy
Tomadilly	554	Scarawalsh	Monart	Enniscorthy
Tomagaddy	379	Gorey	Monamolin	Gorey
Tomagaddy Little	12	Gorey	Monamolin	Gorey
Tomanine	299	Bantry	Templeludigan	New Ross
Tomanoole	389	Scarawalsh	Monart	Enniscorthy
Tomatee	208	Scarawalsh	Templeshanbo	Enniscorthy
Tomathone Lower	202	Gorey	Kilnenor	Gorey
Tomathone Upper	129	Gorey	Kilnenor	Gorey
Tombay	154	Gorey	Kilnahue	Gorey
Tombrack	478	Scarawalsh	Ballycarney	Enniscorthy
Tombrackwood	200	Scarawalsh	Ballycarney	Enniscorthy
Tombrick	877	Scarawalsh	Ballycarney	Enniscorthy
Tomcool	49	Shelmaliere West	Coolstuff	Wexford
Tomcool Big	170	Shelmaliere West	Kilbrideglynn	Wexford
Tomcool Little	77	Shelmaliere West	Kilbrideglynn	Wexford
Tomcoyle	256	Gorey	Kilnenor	Gorey
Tomcoyle	156	Gorey	Liskinfere	Gorey
Tomcoylehill	137	Gorey	Kilnenor	Gorey
Tomduff	179	Ballaghkeen	Killenagh	Gorey
Tomduff	134	Bantry	St. John's	Enniscorthy
Tomfarney	724	Bantry	Chapel	Enniscorthy
Tomfarney Lower	182	Bantry	Kilcowanmore	Enniscorthy
Tomfarney Upper	282	Bantry	Kilcowanmore	Enniscorthy
Tomgar	252	Gorey	Ballycanew	Gorey
Tomgarrow	570	Bantry	Adamstown	New Ross
Tomgarrow	490	Scarawalsh	Ballycarney	Enniscorthy
Tomgarrow	247	Ballaghkeen	Killincooly	Gorey
Tomgarrow	45	Ballaghkeen	Kilnamanagh	Gorey
Tomhaggard	230	Bargy	Tomhaggard	Wexford
Tominearly	1,021	Bantry	Killegney	Enniscorthy
Tomlane	189	Ballaghkeen	Edermine	Enniscorthy
Tomnaboley Lower	301	Gorey	Kilcormick	Enniscorthy
Tomnaboley Upper	107	Gorey	Kilcormick	Enniscorthy
Tomnafunshoge	554	Scarawalsh	Templeshannon	Enniscorthy
Tomnahealy	181	Gorey	Kilcavan	Gorey
Tomnahealy Little	94	Gorey	Kilcavan	Gorey
Tomnakippeen	66	Scarawalsh	Monart	Enniscorthy
Tomnalossett	219	Bantry	St. John's	Enniscorthy
Tomnamuck	176	Ballaghkeen	Donaghmore	Gorey
Tomona	386	Scarawalsh	Templeshanbo	Enniscorthy
Tomsallagh	1,049	Scarawalsh	Clone	Enniscorthy
Tomsilla Lower	213	Ballaghkeen	Kiltennell	Gorey
Tomsilla Upper	250	Ballaghkeen	Kiltennell	Gorey
Toom	152	Scarawalsh	Clone	Enniscorthy
Torduff	260	Ballaghkeen	Donaghmore	Gorey
Tottenhamgreen	581	Shelmaliere West	Horetown	New Ross
Townamulloge	417	Bantry	Rossdroit	Enniscorthy
Townparks	525	Forth	St. John's	Wexford
Townparks	87	Forth	St. Michael's of Feagh	Wexford
Townparks	23	Forth	St. Peter's	Wexford
Tracystown East	204	Shelmaliere West	Taghmon	Wexford
Tracystown West	401	Shelmaliere West	Taghmon	New Ross
Trane	28	Forth	St. Iberius	Wexford
Trianglepark	5	Bantry	St. Mary's	New Ross
Trimmer	150	Forth	Kilscoran	Wexford
Tullabards Great	262	Bargy	Kilturk	Wexford
Tullabards Little	138	Bargy	Kilturk	Wexford
Tullabeg	213	Gorey	Toome	Gorey
Tullerstown	205	Shelburne	Tintern	New Ross
Tullispark	134	Bargy	Kilmannan	Wexford
Tullycanna	384	Bargy	Ambrosetown	Wexford
**Tullycanny**	Town	Bargy	Ambrosetown	Wexford
Turkyle	142	Ballaghkeen	St. Nicholas	Enniscorthy
Tuskar Rock	1	Forth	St. Margaret's	Wexford
Twelveacre	22	Forth	Ballybrennan	Wexford
Twentyacres	28	Forth	Kildavin	Wexford
Upton	249	Ballaghkeen	Kilmuckridge	Gorey
Upton	116	Shelmaliere West	Taghmon	New Ross
Vernegly	239	Bargy	Bannow	Wexford
Verosland	16	Bantry	St. Mary's	New Ross
Waddingsland	67	Forth	Kilrane	Wexford
Waddingtown	230	Bargy	Ballyconnick	Wexford
Walsheslough	170	Forth	Rosslare	Wexford
Walshestown	146	Forth	Rathmacknee	Wexford
Walshestown	75	Forth	Ishartmon	Wexford
Walshgriague	87	Bargy	Ambrosetown	Wexford
Warren and Bog	97	Ballaghkeen	Donaghmore	Gorey
Warren Lower	197	Forth	Rosslare	Wexford
Warren Middle	53	Forth	Rosslare	Wexford
Waste	154	Scarawalsh	Toome	Gorey
**Watch House**	Town	Scarawalsh	Moyacomb	Shillelagh
Wells	360	Ballaghkeen	Killincooly	Gorey
Wells	37	Ballaghkeen	Kilnamanagh	Gorey
Wellshill	238	Ballaghkeen	Killincooly	Gorey
Weneytown	70	Bargy	Duncormick	Wexford
Westmeadows	52	Bargy	Kilmannan	Wexford
**Wexford**	Town	Forth	Maudlintown	Wexford
**Wexford**	Town	Forth	St. Bridget's	Wexford
**Wexford**	Town	Forth	St. Doologe's	Wexford
**Wexford**	Town	Forth	St. Iberius	Wexford
**Wexford**	Town	Forth	St. John's	Wexford
**Wexford**	Town	Forth	St. Mary's	Wexford
**Wexford**	Town	Forth	St. Michael's of Feagh	Wexford
**Wexford**	Town	Forth	St. Patrick's	Wexford
**Wexford**	Town	Forth	St. Peter's	Wexford
**Wexford**	Town	Forth	St. Selskar's	Wexford
Wheelagower	860	Scarawalsh	Templeshanbo	Enniscorthy
Whitechurch	747	Shelburne	Whitechurch	New Ross
Whitefort	85	Shelmaliere East	Artramon	Wexford
Whitefort	34	Shelmaliere East	Ballynaslaney	Enniscorthy
Whitefort	32	Shelmaliere East	Kilpatrick	Wexford
Whitehouse	37	Forth	Rosslare	Wexford
Whitemill North	29	Forth	St. Peter's	Wexford
Whitemill South	42	Forth	St. Peter's	Wexford
Whitepark	131	Gorey	Kilgorman	Gorey
Whiterock North	27	Forth	Maudlintown	Wexford
Whiterock South	171	Forth	Maudlintown	Wexford
Whitestown	108	Forth	Rathaspick	Wexford
Whitestown Lower (or Hermitage)	37	Forth	Drinagh	Wexford
Whitestown Upper	34	Forth	Drinagh	Wexford
Whitewell	158	Scarawalsh	Toome	Gorey
Whitewell	12	Forth	St. Michael's of Feagh	Wexford
Whittyshill	105	Bargy	Kilcavan	Wexford
Wilkinstown	706	Bantry	Whitechurchglynn	Wexford
Wilton	596	Bantry	Clonmore	Enniscorthy
Wingfield	326	Gorey	Kilpipe	Gorey
Winningstown	240	Shelburne	Fethard	New Ross
Woodbrook Demesne	245	Bantry	Killann	Enniscorthy
Woodgraigue	189	Bargy	Ambrosetown	Wexford
Woodlands	632	Scarawalsh	Monart	Enniscorthy
Woodlands	71	Ballaghkeen	Ballynaslaney	Enniscorthy
Woodpark	120	Gorey	Liskinfere	Gorey
Woodtown	109	Forth	Rosslare	Wexford
Woodtown	97	Bargy	Kilmannan	Wexford
Woodtown	83	Forth	Mayglass	Wexford
Worlough	36	Scarawalsh	Kilbride	Enniscorthy
Yolegrew	81	Shelmaliere West	Coolstuff	Wexford
Yolegrew	29	Shelmaliere West	Taghmon	Wexford
Yoletown	531	Shelburne	Owenduff	New Ross
Yoletown	125	Forth	Ballymore	Wexford
Yoletown	120	Forth	Tacumshin	Wexford
Yoletown	113	Bargy	Kilcowan	Wexford
Yoletown	84	Forth	Ballybrennan	Wexford
Youngstown	300	Shelmaliere West	Coolstuff	Wexford
