= Jonathan Cooper (disambiguation) =

Jonathan Cooper (born 1990) is an American football guard.

Jonathan or Jon Cooper may also refer to:

- Jonathan Cooper (priest) (1820–1898), Irish priest
- Jonathan Cooper (bioengineer) (born 1961), British bioengineer
- Jonathan Cooper (barrister) (1962–2021), British barrister and human rights activist
- Jonathan Cooper (politician), American politician, member of the Vermont House of Representatives from 2025
- Jon Cooper (born 1967), Canadian-American ice hockey coach
- Jon Cooper (American football) (born 1986), American football center

== See also ==
- Jonathon Cooper (born 1998), American football defensive end
- John Cooper (disambiguation)
- Johnny Cooper (disambiguation)
