= William Atkins =

William, Bill or Billy Atkins may refer to:

- William Atkins (doctor) (fl. 1694), English quack and supposed curer of gout
- William Atkins (Jesuit) (1601–1681), English Jesuit
- William Atkins (architect) (1811–1887), Irish architect
- William Atkins (priest) (died 1892), Dean of Ferns
- William Atkins (Australian politician) (1836–1920), Australian politician
- William Sydney Atkins (1902–1989), founder of Atkins, engineering consultants
- Billy Atkins (American football) (1934–1991), American football player and coach
- Bill Atkins (cricketer) (born 1938), former English cricketer
- Bill Atkins (footballer) (born 1939), former professional footballer
- Bill Atkins (Georgia politician) (born 1933), American politician
- William Atkins (author), winner of 2016 Eccles Centre & Hay Festival Writer's Award
