= Geoffrey of St John =

English-born bishop in Ireland (died 1258)

Geoffrey of St. John (died 1258) was an English-born clergyman who became Bishop of Ferns.

He came to Ireland in the entourage of his predecessor as Bishop, John of St John, who is thought to have been his brother. John first appeared in Ireland in 1212 as a royal clerk who was attached to the Exchequer of Ireland. Geoffrey became Treasurer of Limerick Cathedral, and was presented to the living of Carrickfergus in 1224. He later became Chancellor of Ferns Cathedral.

Like his predecessor he served as Chief Escheator of Ireland, being appointed in 1250, and as a justice in eyre from 1252, becoming senior justice in 1255. On the death of Bishop John, which probably occurred in 1253, Geoffrey was elected to succeed him in 1254. He died before May 1258.

== Sources ==
- Ball, F. Elrington The Judges in Ireland 1221-1921 London John Murray 1926
