= Joseph Story (disambiguation) =

Joseph Story (1779–1845) was an associate justice of the Supreme Court of the United States

Joseph Story may also refer to:

== People ==
- Joseph Story (bishop) (died 1757), an Anglican bishop in Ireland
- Joseph Story (priest) (died 1767), an Anglican priest in Ireland and son of the bishop of the same name

== Other uses ==
- Joseph Story House, the former home of the US Supreme Court justice
- Joseph Story Award, an award for legal scholarship given by the Federalist Society
- The story of Joseph (Genesis) in the Book of Genesis

== See also ==
- Joseph Storey (1923–1975), a Canadian architect
- Joseph (disambiguation) for other historical figures and fictional stories with the name Joseph
