= Patrick Barrett =

Irish bishop

Patrick Barrett (died 10 November 1415) was an Irishman who held religious and secular high offices in Ireland.

== Biography ==
Patrick Barrett was an Augustinian Canon at Kells Priory in the Roman Catholic Diocese of Ossory, County Kilkenny. He succeeded Thomas Dene as Bishop of Ferns. He was consecrated Bishop of Ferns in Rome in December 1400. After returning to Ireland, Barrett was restored to possession of the temporalities on 11 April 1401.

Barrett built a tower house at Mountgarret in 1408. He was justice and Keeper of the Peace for Wexford. He was Lord Chancellor of Ireland from 1410 to 1412, and was then superseded by Thomas Cranley. Despite complaints, common throughout the Middle Ages in Ireland, about "the dangers of the roads" he was able to go on assize in Munster and South Leinster in 1410 to hear "certain urgent causes". He appropriated the church of Ardcolm to Selskar Abbey (the Abbey of Saint Peter and Saint Paul) in Wexford. He moved the diocesan seat from Ferns to New Ross, due to the chronic political disturbance in Ferns. He helped to suppress a rebellion in Wexford in 1412. He compiled a catalogue of his predecessors in the see of Ferns.

In 1414 he obtained leave for one of his chaplains to go and study at the University of Oxford for four years. He died on 10 November 1415 and was buried at Kells Priory. He was succeeded as Bishop of Ferns by Robert Whittey, who held the See for forty years and lived to be almost ninety.

== Sources ==
- Cotton, Henry (1848). The Succession of the Prelates and Members of the Cathedral Bodies of Ireland. Fasti ecclesiae Hiberniae. Vol. 2, The Province of Leinster. Dublin: Hodges and Smith.
- Dempsey, Jim (September 2015), Mountgarret Medieval Tower House
- "Patrick Barrett", Ricorso.net
