= John Dowse =

John Dowse may refer to:

- John Dowse (priest) (c. 1815 – 1892), Irish Anglican priest
- John Dowse (rugby union, born 1891) (1891–1964), Irish-born British Army medical officer and rugby union player
- John Henry Dowse (born 1935), Australian rugby union player
