= Henry Lyster =

Irish Anglican cleric (1862–1932)

Henry Cameron Lyster (12 February 1862 – 30 July 1932) was Dean of Ferns from 1926 until his death.

Lyster was educated at Trinity College, Dublin and ordained in 1886. After curacies in Hillsborough, Downpatrick and Dublin he became the incumbent at Enniscorthy in 1895. He was Treasurer of Ferns Cathedral from 1914 until his appointment as Dean.

== Notes ==
Church of Ireland titles
Preceded by Thomas Brownell Gibson	Dean of Ferns; 1926–1932	Succeeded by William Gibson
