= Joseph Story (priest) =

Irish Anglican priest

Joseph Story was an 18th-century Anglican priest in Ireland.

The son of another Joseph Story Bishop of Kilmore from 1742 to 1757 He was educated at Trinity College, Dublin. Story was ordained deacon on 28 August 1743 and priest on 4 September that year.

He was appointed

- Archdeacon of Kilmore in 1745
- Vicar general of the Diocese of Kilmore in 1746
- Vicar of Killersherdiny in 1754
- and in 1560 Prebend of Whitechurch in Ferns Cathedral

He died on 17 December 1767.
