= Alfred Forbes =

Irish Anglican cleric

Alfred Forbes was Dean of Ferns from 1936 until 1949. Forbes was educated at Trinity College Dublin and ordained in 1921. After a curacies in Enniscorthy and Preban he held incumbencies at Carnew and Kilscoran until his appointment as Dean.

== Notes ==
Church of Ireland titles
Preceded by William Gibson	Dean of Ferns; 1936–1949	Succeeded by Thomas Henry Crampton McFall
