= Thomas Ram (junior) =

Irish Anglican cleric

Thomas Ram was an Anglican priest in the early seventeenth century.

He was the son of Thomas Ram, Bishop of Ferns and Leighlin from 1605 to 1634. He was educated at Trinity College, Dublin. and was Dean of Ferns from 1626 to 1629.

Church of Ireland titles
Preceded by Thomas Ram (senior)	Dean of Ferns; 1626–1629	Succeeded by Robert Wilson
