= Leslie Forrest =

Irish Anglican cleric

Leslie David Arthur Forrest was the Dean of Ferns from 1995 until 2011.

Leslie Forrest was born in 1946, educated at Trinity College, Dublin and ordained in 1971. After a curacy at Conwall he held incumbencies at Tullyaughnish and Galway until his appointment as Dean.

== Notes ==
Church of Ireland titles
Preceded by David Kaye Lee Earl	Dean of Ferns; 2011–	Succeeded by Paul Mooney
