= Selskar Abbey =

Ruined Augustinian priory in Wexford, Ireland

- Mainistir Sheilsceire
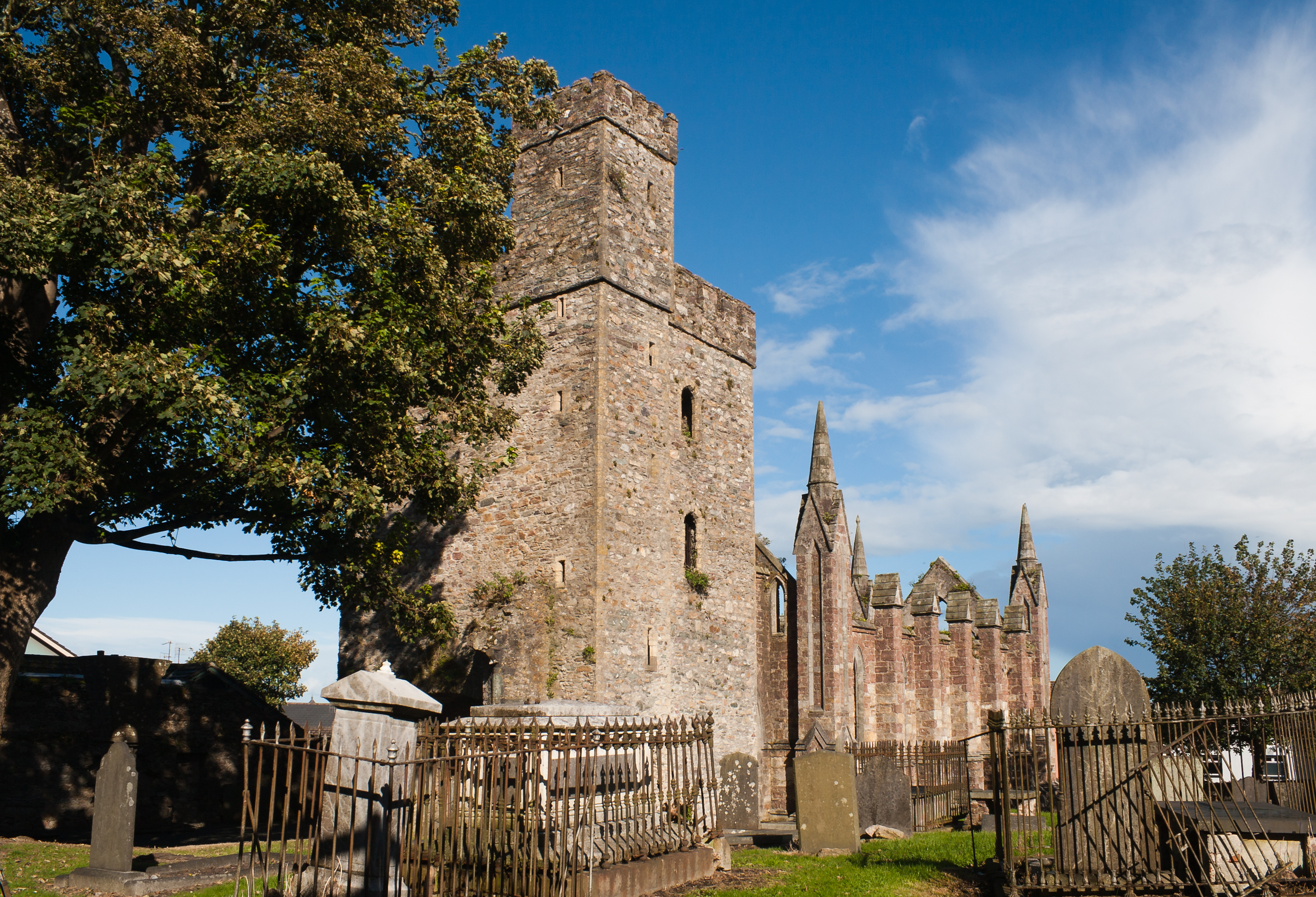
- The abbey in 2012

- Location within Ireland

Monastery information
- Full name: Priory of St. Peter and St. Paul
- Other names: Wexford Priory; Loch-Garman; Loch-Carmen; Weysford; Veyesereford; Viesercford
- Order: Augustinian Canons Regular
- Established: c.1190
- Disestablished: 1540
- Dedication: Saint Peter and Saint Paul
- Diocese: Ferns

People
- Founder: Sir Alexander Ferguson

Architecture
- Status: ruined
- Style: Norman architecture

Site
- Location: Abbey Street, Wexford, County Wexford, Ireland
- Coordinates: 52°20′29″N 6°27′57″W
- Visible remains: church with tower

National monument of Ireland
- Official name: St. Selsker's
- Reference no.: 445

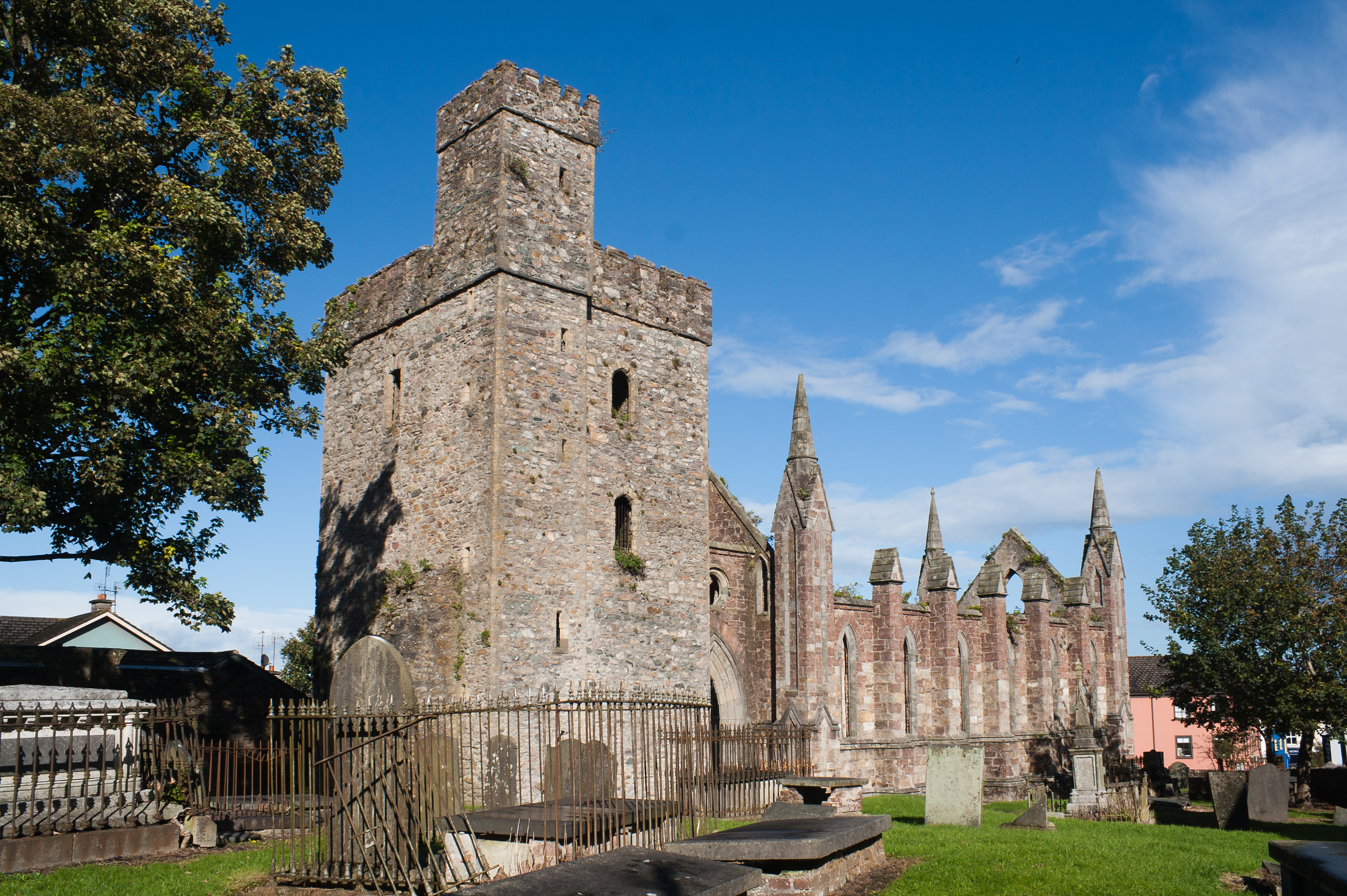
Selskar Priory Tower and Church Nave

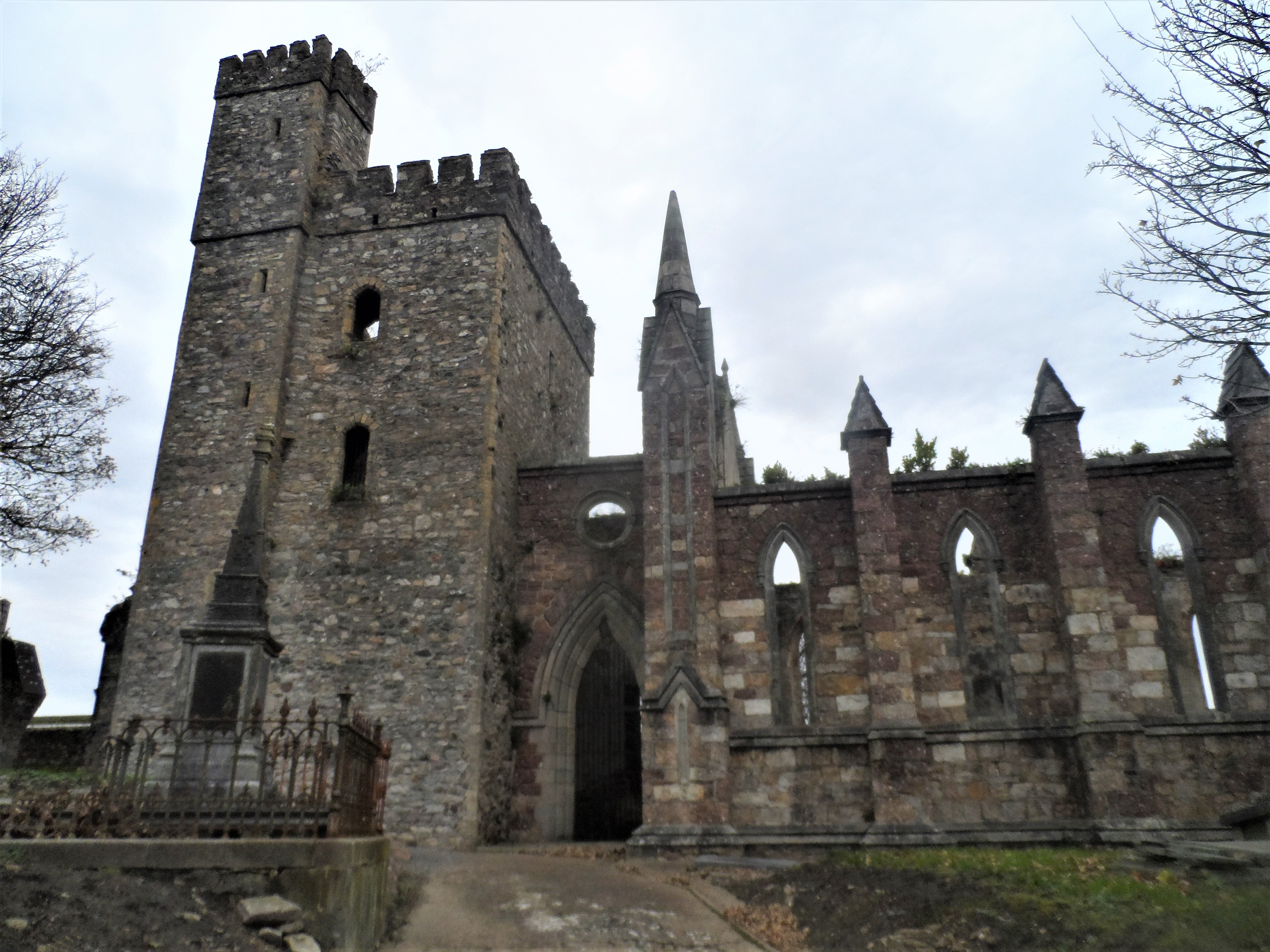
View of the south wall

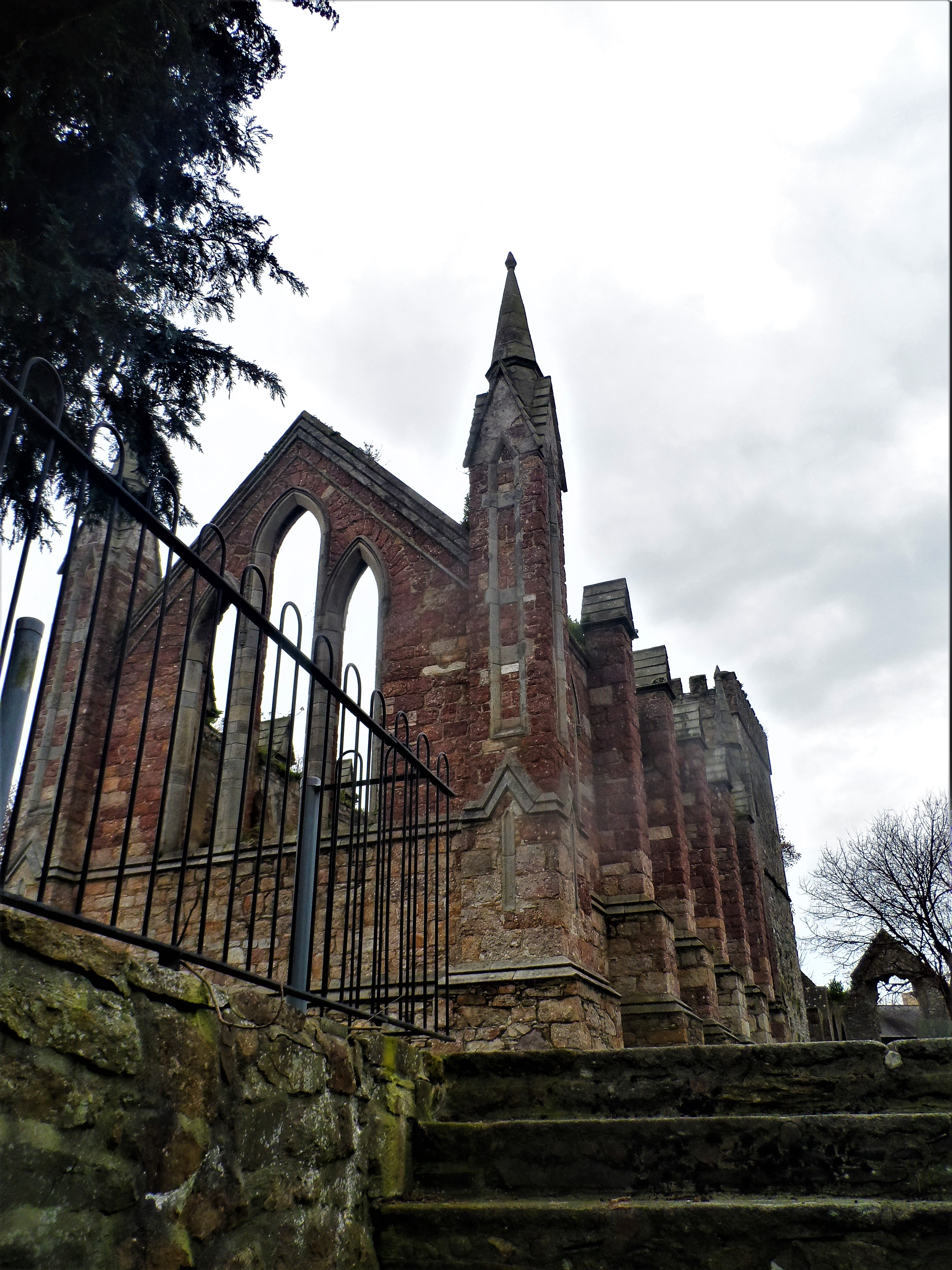
East view with red sandstone walls

Selskar Abbey (Irish: Mainistir Sheilsceire) is a ruined Augustinian abbey in Wexford, Ireland. Founded in the twelfth century, the abbey's full name was the Priory of St Peter and St Paul.

The name is derived from Old Norse sel-skar, "seal skerry."

== History ==
It is claimed that originally a Viking temple dedicated to Odin stood on the site.

=== First church on site ===
There was an earlier church on the site: it was here in 1169 that Diarmait Mac Murchada signed the first Anglo-Irish peace treaty. The leading Norman commander Raymond FitzGerald, (nicknamed Le Gros) and his wife Basila de Clare, sister of Richard de Clare, 2nd Earl of Pembroke (nicknamed Strongbow), are said to have been married at Selskar in 1174.

There is a long-standing tradition that King Henry II spent Lent of 1172 at Selskar Abbey, where he did penance for the murder of Thomas Becket. It is unclear if there is any truth in the story, although Henry was in Ireland at the time, and Becket's murder, some fifteen months earlier, was still a subject of great controversy. Henry might well have felt that Selskar was the right place to make an appropriate gesture of penance.

=== Second foundation ===
The surviving ruins are of the abbey which was founded about 1190 by Alexander de la Roche, ancestor of the Roche family who hold the title Baron Fermoy. The abbey was built with Dundry stone and dressed granite. A synod was held there in 1240. The square bell tower is thought to be of the 14th century.

In the early 1400s Ardcolm Church, Castlebridge, was appropriated to Selskar by the Bishop of Ferns, Patrick Barrett.

We have a glimpse of life in the abbey through a letter which John Topcliffe, the Lord Chief Justice of Ireland, addressed to Henry VIII in 1511. He complained that the monks who "time out of mind" had chosen their own Prior, had elected a "good blessed religious man" as Prior, but that the Abbot had turned him out. It is unclear why the Chief Justice, who was an Englishman without any obvious ties to Wexford, nor to the Augustinian Order, was so concerned about the affair, nor why he thought the King would be interested. The King's reply, if any, is not recorded.

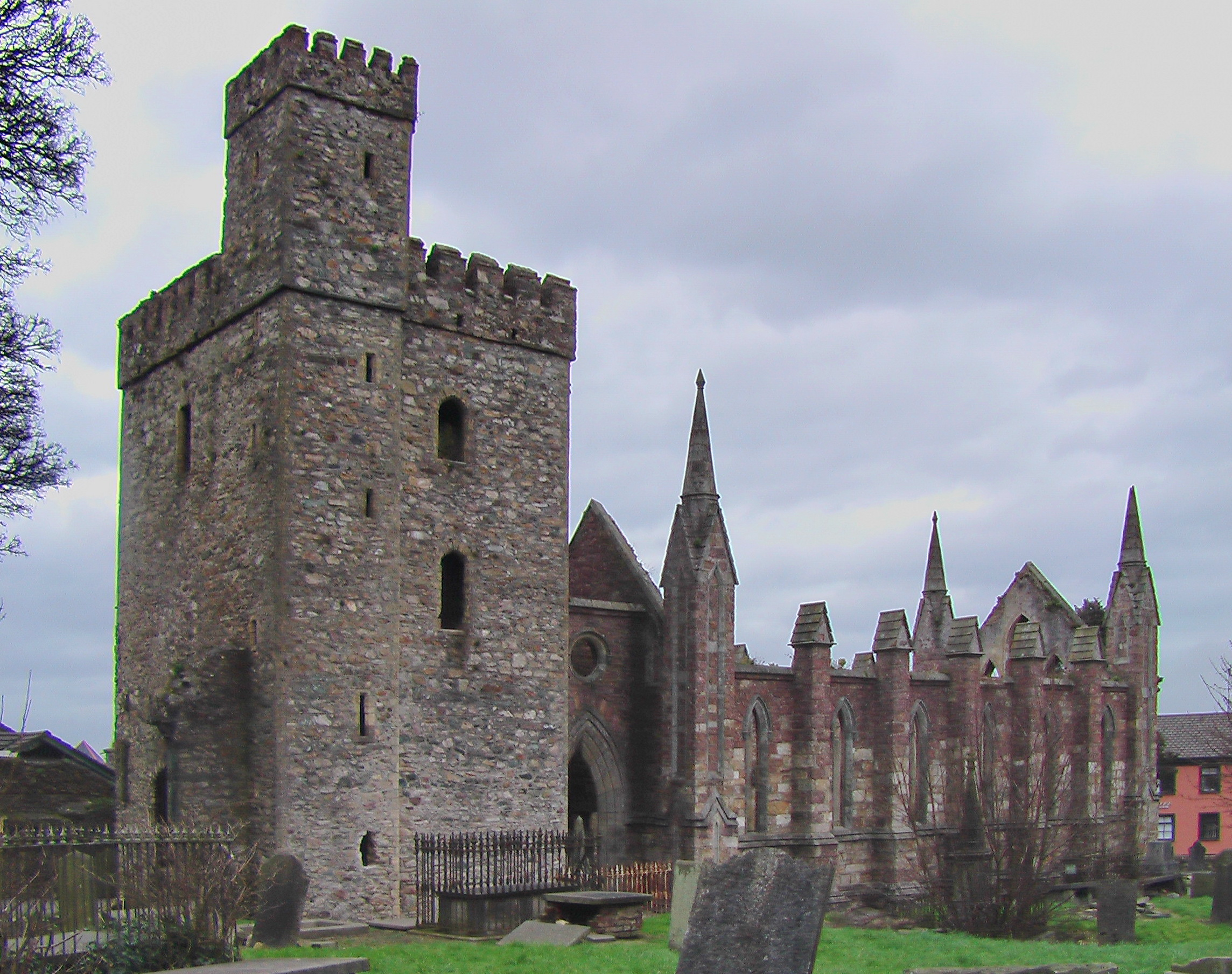
Selskar Abbey

=== Suppression and later history ===
The Abbey was suppressed in 1542 and the property was given to John Parker, the Master of the Rolls in Ireland. It later passed to the Stafford family.

The Abbey was reportedly sacked in 1649. Along with six other Wexford churches, it was destroyed following the surrender of the town to Oliver Cromwell that year. Cromwell ordered the bells of the abbey shipped to the arsenal at Chester, possibly with the intention of having them melted down for gun metal. Instead, the Dean of Liverpool purchased and removed them to the Old Church near River Street, Liverpool.

=== Today ===
Selskar Abbey is part of the Westgate Heritage Tower; it reopened to the public in July 2012. However it can only be visited as part of a guided tour, run by volunteers from Wexford Lions Club (Monday to Saturday, at 11am leaving from the heritage centre at Westgate(Y35 X2DK) - in July & August).
