= Dean of Ferns =

Church of Ireland official

The Dean of Ferns is based at The Cathedral Church of St Edan, Ferns in the united Diocese of Cashel and Ossory within the Church of Ireland.

In 2026, the incumbent is Paul Mooney.

== List ==
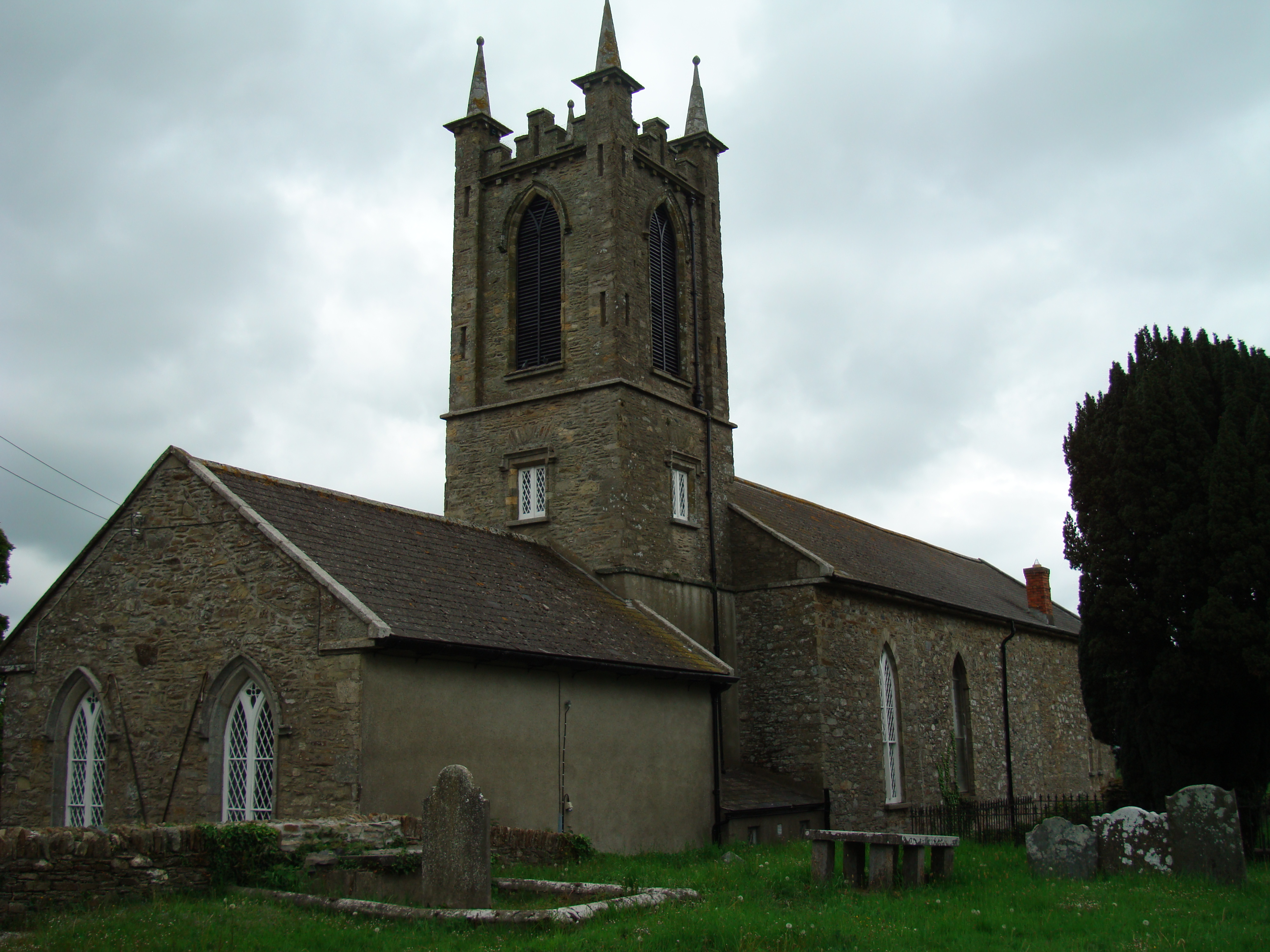
Ferns Cathedral

- 1272–1282 Richard of Northampton (appointed Bishop of Ferns 1282)
- 1558–1559 John Garvie (afterwards Archdeacon of Meath and Bishop of Kilmore 1585)
- 1559 John Devereux (appointed Bishop of Ferns, 1566 but with right to retain deanery in commendam for five years)
- 1568/9 Walter Turner
- 1590 William Campyon or Champion
- 1601–1625 Thomas Ram (afterwards Bishop of Ferns and Leighlin, 1605 but retaining deanery in commendam)
- 1610 (John Thoms)?
- 1625/6 Thomas Ram jnr
- 1628/9 Robert Wilson
- 1642/3 Anthony Proctor
- 1661 John Watson
- 1666–1670 John Creighton
- 1670–1672 Benjamin Phipps (afterwards Dean of Down, 1682)
- 1682–1694 Tobias Pullen (afterwards Bishop of Cloyne, 1694)
- 1694 Thomas Cox
- 1719–1720 William Crosse (afterwards Dean of Lismore 1720)
- 1720–1724 Arthur Price (afterwards Bishop of Clonfert and Kilmacduagh, 1724)
- 1724–1727/8 Pascal (or Paul) Ducasse (afterwards Dean of Clogher, 1717)
- 1727/8– Thomas Sawbridge
- 1733–1734 George Stone (afterwards Dean of Derry 1734 and later Bishop of Ferns, 1740)
- 1734–1740 Joseph Story (afterwards Bishop of Killaloe, 1740)
- 1740–1747 Robert Watts (afterwards Dean of Kilkenny, 1747)
- 1747–1769 John Alcock
- 1769–1787 Richard Marlay (afterwards Bishop of Clonfert and Kilmacduagh, 1787)
- 1787–1794 Hon Thomas Stopford (afterwards Bishop of Cork and Ross, 1794)
- 1794–1842 Peter Browne
- 1842–1862 Henry Newland
- 1862–1862 Hamilton Verschoyle (afterwards Bishop of Kilmore, Elphin and Ardagh, 1862)
- 1863–1879 William Atkins
- 1879–1892 John R Dowse
- 1892–1896 Charles Hind
- 1896–1897 Humphrey Eakins Ellison
- 1897–1898 Jonathan Sisson Cooper
- 1899–1908 John Alexander
- 1908–1926 Thomas Brownell Gibson
- 1926–1932 Henry Cameron Lyster
- 1932–1936 William Gibson
- 1936–1949 Alfred Forbes
- 1949–1979 Thomas Henry Crampton McFall
- 1979–1994 David Kaye Lee Earl
- 1995–2011 Leslie David Arthur Forrest
- 2011–present Paul Gerard Mooney
