= Charles Hind =

Charles Hind may refer to:

- Charles Hind (priest) (1827–1896), dean of Ferns, 1892–1896
- C. Lewis Hind (1862–1927), British journalist, writer, editor, art critic, and art historian
