= Walter Turner =

Walter Turner may refer to:

- Walter J. Turner (1884–1946), Australian-born, English-domiciled writer and critic
- Walter Turner (priest), Dean of Ferns, 1569–1590
- Walter Turner (cricketer) (1881–1948), English cricketer
