= Sawbridge (surname) =

Sawbridge is an English surname. Notable people with the surname include:

- Jacob Sawbridge (c. 1665–1748), English banker
- Janet Sawbridge (1947–2021), British ice dancer and figure skating coach
- John Sawbridge (1732–1795), English politician
- Samuel Elias Sawbridge (1769–1850), English politician
- Thomas Sawbridge (died 1733), Dean of Ferns
