= Thomas Ram =

Irish Anglican priest

- Born: 1564
- Died: 24 November 1634 (aged 69–70); Dublin
- Education: Eton College
- Alma mater: King's College, Cambridge
- Occupation: Priest
- Years active: 1599–1634
- Religion: Christian
- Church: Anglican

Thomas Ram (1564 – 1634) was an Anglican priest in the early seventeenth century.

Born at Windsor, he was educated at Eton and King's College, Cambridge. He was appointed Chaplain to Robert Devereux, 2nd Earl of Essex the Lord Lieutenant of Ireland in 1599; Vicar choral of Christ Church Cathedral, Dublin in 1600; Dean of Cork in 1601; Dean of Ferns in 1604; and Bishop of Ferns and Leighlin in 1605.

He died in Dublin on 24 November 1634.

Church of Ireland titles
Preceded by Robert Grave	Dean of Cork; 1601–1604	Succeeded by George Ley
Preceded by William Campyon	Dean of Ferns; 1604–1625	Succeeded by Thomas Ram (junior)
Preceded by Nicholas Stafford	Bishop of Ferns and Leighlin; 1605–1634	Succeeded by George Andrews
