= Fiodh Ard =

Fiodh Ard (Irish for 'high wood') may refer to two places in Ireland:

- Fethard, County Tipperary, a town
- Fethard-on-Sea, County Wexford, a village
