= David Earl =

David Earl may refer to:

- David Earl (composer) (born 1951), South African composer and pianist
- David Earl (actor) (born 1974), British actor and comedian
- David Earl (priest) (1928–2017), Dean of Ferns
