= John Corvan =

John Corvan (13 January 1804 – 11 May 1897) was an Irish Anglican priest.

Corvan was educated at Trinity College, Dublin, He was ordained in 1828. He was Archdeacon of Ferns from 1871 to 1875.
