= James Browne (bishop of Ferns) =

Catholic bishop in Ireland (1842–1917)

The Most Reverend James Browne
- Bishop of Ferns
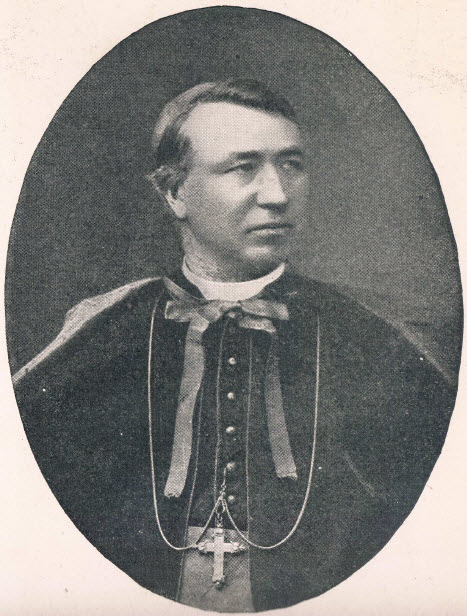

Personal details
- Born: 28 August 1842 Mayglass, County Wexford, Ireland
- Died: 21 June 1917 (aged 74)
- Education: Maynooth College

James Browne (1842–1917) was an Irish Roman Catholic clergyman who served as the Bishop of Ferns from 1884 to 1917.

Born in Mayglass, County Wexford, Ireland on 28 August 1842, Browne studied in Maynooth College where he was ordained to the priesthood on 25 December 1865. He was appointed bishop of the Diocese of Ferns on 8 July 1884 and consecrated on 14 September 1884 by James Lynch, Bishop of Kildare and Leighlin.

Browne died in office on 21 June 1917, aged 74 years old.

Catholic Church titles
Preceded by Michael Warren	Bishop of Ferns; 1884–1917	Succeeded by William Codd
