= Robert Whittey =

15th-century Irish bishop

Robert Whitty
- Bishop of Ferns
- Church: Catholic Church
- Diocese: Ferns
- Elected: February 1418
- Retired: 1457
- Predecessor: Patrick Barrett
- Other post: Member of the Privy Council of Ireland

Personal details
- Born: 1370 Ballyteige Castle, Kilmore Quay, County Wexford, Ireland
- Died: 1458 (aged 87–88)
- Parents: Sir Richard Whitty of Ballyteige Castle
- Occupation: Bishop, Precentor of Ferns Cathedral

Robert Whittey, or Whitty (1370–1458) was a Bishop of Ferns in Ireland, notable for his long tenure of the see, and his great age at death.

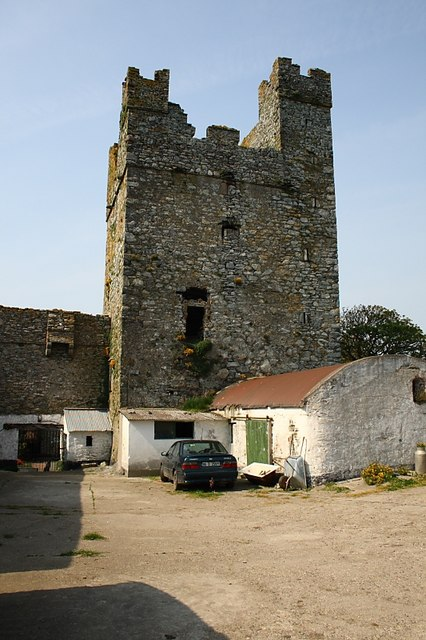
The remaining tower of Ballyteige Castle, Robert Whittey's father's house

He was the son of Sir Richard Whitty of Ballyteige Castle, outside Kilmore Quay, County Wexford. The Whittys were early Anglo-Norman settlers in Wexford. Ballyteige was burnt around 1408 but quickly rebuilt: one tower of the castle still stands. Robert himself was in residence at Ballyteige in 1425. The Whittys retained possession of Ballyteige until they were expelled by Cromwellian forces in 1654.

Robert was precentor of Ferns Cathedral, and was elected bishop by the cathedral chapter in February 1418. At that time the town of New Ross, which his predecessor Patrick Barrett had made the effective centre of the diocese in preference to Ferns itself, had long been under a papal interdict, as a punishment for a riot which resulted in the killing of several monks of the Order of Crutched Friars by the townspeople. The Bishop worked hard to have the interdict lifted and was finally successful in 1435 in persuading Pope Eugenius IV to grant absolution to the townspeople of New Ross. He was a member of the Privy Council of Ireland.

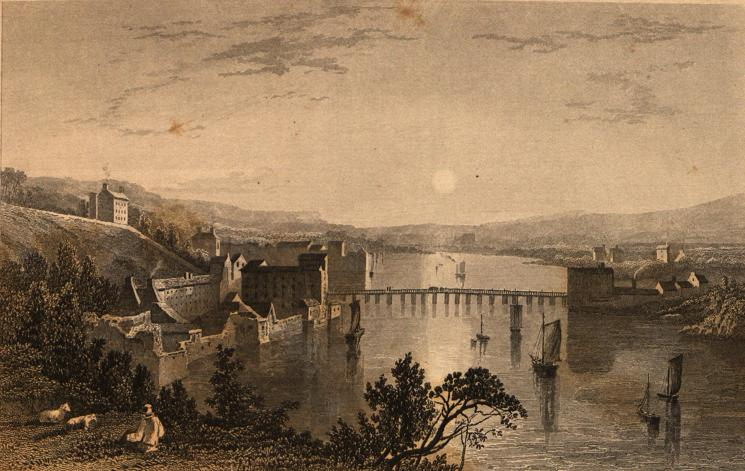
New Ross, early nineteenth century

As he grew older, his health began to fail, and he is said to have been bedridden in his last years. Accordingly, a statute of 1450 excused him from any further attendance at sessions of parliament or meetings of the Great Council, due to his "age and infirmity". In 1456 he was apparently well enough to sit on a three-man commission to choose the High Sheriff of Wexford. He resigned the see in 1457, after a forty-year tenure, and died the following year, aged eighty-eight.

== Sources ==
- Grattan-Flood, W.H. History of the Diocese of Ferns Waterford, Downey and Co. 1916
- Nicholas Furlong History of Wexford Dublin, Gill and MacMillan 2003
- Whitty, M.J "The Whitty Tomb in the Ruined Church at Kilmore, County of Wexford" (1872) The Journal of the Royal Historical and Archaeological Society of Ireland Series 4 Vol.2
