= William Crosse =

William Crosse was an 18th-century Anglican Dean in Ireland.

Crosse was Rector of St Mary, Dublin. He was Dean of Ferns from 1719 to 1720; Dean of Lismore from 1720 to 1723; and Dean of Leighlin from 1723 to 1749.
