= Walter Turner (priest) =

Walter Turner was Dean of Ferns from 1569 to 1590.

== Notes ==
Church of Ireland titles
Preceded by John Devereux	Dean of Ferns; 1569–1590	Succeeded by William Campyon
