= Michael Warren (bishop) =

Irish Roman Catholic clergyman

- Church: Roman Catholic Church
- Diocese: Ferns
- In office: 1876–1884

Orders
- Ordination: 7 May 1876

Personal details
- Born: 1825 Clonmore, County Wexford, Ireland
- Died: 22 April 1884 (aged 58–59) Wexford, Ireland
- Education: St Patrick's Pontifical University, Maynooth

Michael Warren (b Clonmore, County Wexford 1825; d Wexford 1884) was an Irish Roman Catholic clergyman who served as the Bishop of Ferns from 1876 until his death.

Warren was educated at St Patrick's Pontifical University, Maynooth. He served curacies in Ballygarrett and Templeludigan. From 1866 to 1876 he was Superior of the House of Missions at Enniscorthy. He was ordained Bishop of Ferns on 7 May 1876, and died in post on 22 April 1884.
