= William Atkins (priest) =

Irish Anglican cleric

William Atkins was Dean of Ferns from 1863 until 1879: his wife Elizabeth died on 13 February 1887.

== Notes ==
Church of Ireland titles
Preceded by Hamilton Verschoyle	Dean of Ferns; 1863–1879	Succeeded by John Dowse
