= William Campyon =

16th century English clergyman

William Campyon was Dean of Ferns from 1590 to 1591.

== Notes ==
Church of Ireland titles
Preceded by Walter Turner	Dean of Ferns; 1590–1591	Succeeded by Thomas Ram
