= James Staunton =

Roman-catholic bishop

James Staunton (b Ballyoskill 20 February 1889; d Enniscorthy 27 June 1963) was an Irish Roman Catholic Bishop.

Staunton was ordained priest on 22 June 1913. He served in the Diocese of Ossory. A Jesuit, he was Bishop of Ferns from 1938 until his death. Dr Staunton was a council father at the Second Vatican Council.

Catholic Church titles
Preceded by William Codd	Bishop of Ferns; 1938–1963	Succeeded by Donal Herlihy
