= John Alexander (priest) =

Irish Anglican priest

John Alexander (2 September 1833 – 10 September 1908) was an Irish Anglican priest who served as Dean of Ferns from 1899 until his death in 1908.

Alexander was born and raised in the parish in Ferns, County Wexford, the son of John Alexander, LL.D, and Mary Molony. His father was rector of Carne and was rumoured to be in consideration for the Dean of Ferns in 1862. The family was of Scottish descent and descended from the Alexanders of Menstrie.

He was educated at Trinity College, Dublin and ordained in 1858. After curacies at Dysart Enos, Stradbally and Callan he was Rector of Corclone from 1869 to 1876; and then of Mulrankin until his appointment as Dean.

In 1866, he married Caroline Jacob, daughter of Dr. John Edmund Jacob. Their son, Major R. G. C. Alexander of the Royal Garrison Artillery, married Daysie Hudson-Kinahan, daughter of Sir Edward Hudson-Kinahan, in 1909.

Church of Ireland titles
Preceded by Jonathan Cooper	Dean of Ferns; 1908–1926	Succeeded by Thomas Brownell Gibson
