= Alfred Cooper (priest) =

Canadian priest

Alfred William Francis Cooper (died 14 November 1920) was Archdeacon of Calgary from 1895 to 1898.

The son of Jonathan Sisson Cooper, Cooper was educated at Trinity College Dublin and ordained in 1874. He held curacies in Stradbally, Tipperary and Booterstown before becoming Rector of Glenealy. He was with the SPG in Canada before his time as Archdeacon and the incumbent at Killanne afterwards.
