= Paul Mooney (priest) =

Irish priest (born 1958)

- Title: Dean of Ferns

Personal life
- Born: 1958 (age 67–68)

Religious life
- Religion: Church of Ireland

Paul Gerard Mooney is, as of 2017, the dean of Ferns.

Mooney was born in 1958 and studied at St Columban's College (Dalgan Park), Navan and St Patrick's College, Maynooth to become a Roman Catholic priest, remaining one until 1990. He was Chaplain to the Mission to Seamen in Korea from then until 1994; and then at Antwerp to 1997. He was Curate at Galway from 1997 to 1998 and then the incumbent at New Ross where he was also Archdeacon of Ferns. In 2007, he became Chaplain at Seoul Anglican Cathedral, a post he held until his appointment as Dean of Ferns. Mooney was awarded a B.D. degree (hons) from the Pontifical University at Maynooth in 1984, a Master of Theology in Missiology degree from the Asian Center for Theological Studies and Mission, Seoul, Korea in 1992 and a Doctor of Theology in Practical and Pastoral Theology from the Protestant Faculty of Theology in Brussels, Belgium in 2002. He is author of the book Maritime Mission published by the Boekencentrum Publishers in the Netherlands in 2005 and of the book A History of ICMA (International Christian Maritime Association) published in London in 2019.
