= Richard Duket =

Sir Richard Duket (died 1245) was an English Crown official who had a highly successful career in England and Ireland, and enjoyed the confidence of two English monarchs, John and Henry III. In a career spanning more than forty years, he served variously as a judge, diplomat, King's Messenger, Sheriff and Royal Secretary.

Despite his eminence, the jurist Henry de Bracton thought poorly of him as a judge, calling him an "unwise and unlearned" man who had never made a proper study of the laws of England, and was forced to rely on help in writing his judgments on the assistance of more learned colleagues.

== Early career ==
He was the son of Nicholas Duket, who was Chamberlain of London in the 1190s. His employment by the English Crown began around 1200. He is said to have been a clerk, i.e. a cleric, but evidently, he took only minor orders: these were not a bar to matrimony, and we know that he married twice and had several children. He was referred to by King John as "my Secretary" (clericus noster) in 1203, and received a pension of 5 marks a year from the revenues of the Abbey of Whitby, which was then in royal hands, for his services. He was also a diplomat, and in 1225 he was one of two officials entrusted with a mission to the Vatican, for which he received a payment of 100 marks for his expenses. He was described then as nuncio (nuncius regius), in the original sense of "envoy". He also had the title King's Messenger, and in that capacity, he undertook numerous official journeys over the years, until he was well into old age. In 1221 he was Sheriff of Norfolk and Suffolk.

== Judge in England ==
In 1224 he and Simon de Hale were appointed itinerant justices: their judicial district eventually covered most of the counties of south-eastern England. He also sat as an itinerant justice (one of four) for Lancashire in 1226–7. His salary was 20 marks. Duket was later appointed the itinerant justice for Cornwall and, late in his career, the judge of assize for the diocese of Durham. The number of royal commissions on which he sat suggests that he was more than an itinerant justice: he seems to have enjoyed seniority over his colleagues, and probably sat as a justice in the Royal Courts at Westminster.

=== Bracton ===
Despite his seniority, the great jurist Henry de Bracton, who probably knew Duket personally (their judicial careers may have slightly overlapped), thought very poorly of him as a judge. Bracton refers explicitly to his practice of seeking guidance on novel or difficult points of law from more learned colleagues like Martin de Pateshull, whose memory Bracton venerated. Duket was almost certainly the principal target of Bracton's diatribe in his most celebrated work De Legibus et consuetudinibus Angliae (On the Laws and Customs of England) against those whom he described as "the unwise and unlearned who ascend the judgment seat before they have learned the laws".

== Judge in Ireland ==
He was first sent to Ireland in 1228 as second itinerant justice (the eyre or circuit system was still in its infancy in Ireland); Simon de Hale joined him there for a short time. Duket also had several important extrajudicial functions, acting as a general adviser to the Justiciar of Ireland, Richard Mór de Burgh, and dealing with a wide variety of business on his behalf, including routine matters like the marriage of John le Poer, son and heir of Robert le Poer, a Royal ward. He also acted as adviser to the Lord High Treasurer of Ireland, John de St John, on financial matters, on which he seems to have been an expert. In 1229, on his return to Ireland after a period spent in England, he had specific instructions to assist the Lord Treasurer in taking all necessary steps in preserving the rights of the Exchequer of Ireland. It is likely that he was one of the senior officials who advised on how to levy the highly successful ecclesiastical "aid", a tax of one-sixteenth on the value of clerical benefices, which enabled de Burgh to send the remarkable sum of 2000 marks to King Henry in 1230. Duket crossed regularly between the two kingdoms. He received several extra payments from the Crown, no doubt reflecting the onerous nature of his duties.

== Last years ==
He does not seem to have served as a judge in Ireland after about 1233, probably as a result of de Burgh's recent removal from office as Justiciar, although he was still visiting Ireland as late as 1240. He continued to serve as a judge in England, and as a King's Messenger, until at least 1242. In 1241 Henry III ordered that he be paid his expenses for his circuit, then in progress, through Lincolnshire, Yorkshire and Nottinghamshire.

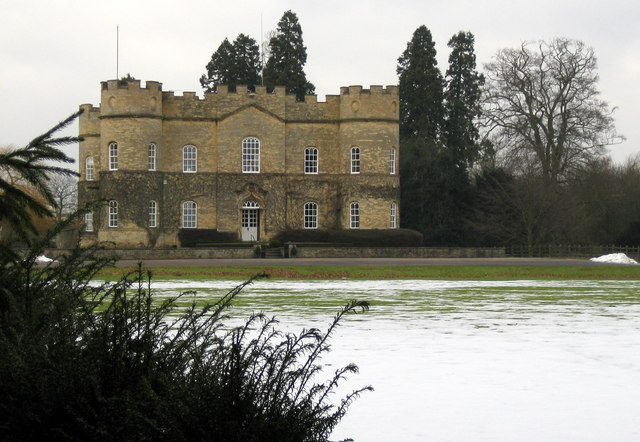
Fillingham, present day

He lived in Lincolnshire, with his main estate at Fillingham; the Crown also granted him lands in Ireland. In 1234 Simon son of William de Seis confirmed a gift of land to Richard at Harmston, Lincolnshire, made by his son, Simon de Seis the younger. He died late in 1245, reportedly at a great age, and on 27 December of that year his eldest son Hugh did homage for his lands.

== Family ==
He married first Margaret, then Beatrice, and had several children as well as Hugh, including William, Adam, Stephen and Margaret. One branch of the family settled at Grayrigg in Cumbria late in the fourteenth century, having inherited through marriage some of the estates of the leading statesman Sir William de Windsor (died 1384). Windsor's sister and co-heiress Margaret married John Duket: some years after Windsor's death they were living in County Cork, and brought legal proceedings over her inheritance there.

== Sources ==
- Ball, F. Elrington The Judges in Ireland 1221-1921 London John Murray 1926
- Burke's Peerage 14th edition London 1852
- Calendar of the Liberate Rolls preserved in the Public Records Office
- Foss, Edward The Judges of England London Longman Brown Green and Longmans 1848
- Harding, Alan England in the Thirteenth Century Cambridge University Press 1993
- Lancashire Assize Rolls 4 John-13 Edward I Published by the Lancashire and Cheshire Record Society 1903
