= Keeragh Islands =

Islands in County Wexford, Ireland

Native name: Oileáin na gCaorach
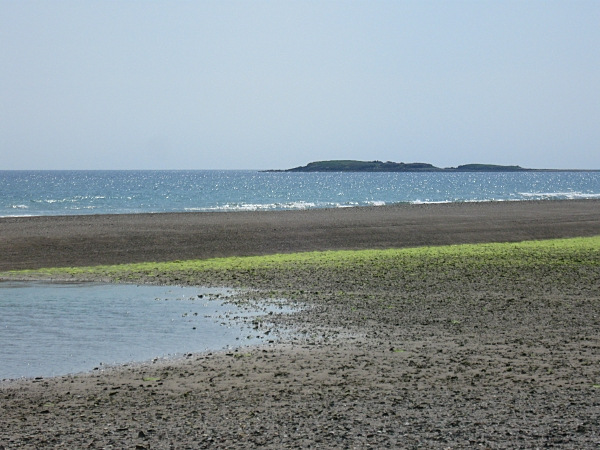
- Viewed from Ballymadder Point

- Location within Ireland
- Etymology: Islands of the sheep

Geography
- Location: Celtic Sea
- Coordinates: 52°11′54″N 6°44′16″W
- Area: 2.38 ha (5.9 acres)
- Highest elevation: 10 m (30 ft)

Administration
- Ireland
- County: Wexford

Demographics
- Population: 0
- Pop. density: 0/km^{2} (0/sq mi)

The Keeragh Islands (Irish: Oileáin na gCaorach) are a pair of small islets located approximately 1.5 km (1 mile) off the coast of Bannow in south County Wexford, Ireland (GPS: Latitude: 52.1983, Longitude: -6.73778). They are a designated Special Protection Area due to their importance as a breeding ground for great cormorants.

The islets are surrounded by a treacherous rocky reef – the ruin on the larger island was built around 1800 for survivors of shipwrecks, but is now very dilapidated.

== Fethard lifeboat disaster ==
On 20 February 1914 the Mexico, a Norwegian barque, ran aground in stormy seas on the reef near the Keeraghs. The Fethard lifeboat was launched, but both vessels were smashed to pieces by mighty waves. Nine of the fourteen lifeboat crew were swept to their deaths; the remaining five joined the eight surviving Norwegian sailors on the exposed reef, where they remained miserably clinging to rocks while the storm continued unabated.

Several attempts to rescue them were foiled before two brave men, Bill Duggan and Jim Wickham of the Rosslare Fort lifeboat, took a dinghy and ferried the survivors two at a time from their ice cold rocks. The operation needed 6 trips in stormy seas to bring all to safety, but on the second of these, the dinghy was holed. For the remaining trips the sea was kept out by a loaf of bread wrapped in oilskins, plugged into the opening.
