= Thomas Cox (priest) =

William Crosse was an Anglican Dean in Ireland in the late 17th and early eighteenth centuries.

Cox was ordained at Westminster Abbey in 1671. He was Vicar of Drogheda and Dean of Ferns from 1694 until 1719.
