= William Gibson (dean of Ferns) =

Irish Anglican cleric

William Gibson was Dean of Ferns from 1932 until 1936. Gibson was educated at the Royal University of Ireland and ordained in 1893. After a curacy at Saint Martin, Jersey, he became the incumbent at Ballycarney. After this he was Vicar of Adamstown then Rector of New Ross until his appointment as dean.

Church of Ireland titles
Preceded by Henry Lyster	Dean of Ferns; 1932–1936	Succeeded by Alfred Forbes
