= Richard of Northampton =

English official in Ireland (died 1304)

Richard of Northampton (died 13 January 1304) was an English-born Crown servant, judge and cleric in Ireland of the late thirteenth and early fourteenth centuries, who ended his career as Bishop of Ferns.

He was a native of Northamptonshire, but little is known of his early life. He was a Crown servant by the early 1260s, and clearly a valued one: in the 1280s he received several rewards for his "laudable service" to the Crown, and in 1264 he was granted a pension of three silver marks to be paid annually by the Abbey of St Thomas the Martyr, in Dublin city.

He became Dean of Ferns in 1272 and a prebendary of the Diocese of Killaloe in 1282. He was appointed an attorney to audit the accounts of the Lord Treasurer of Ireland in the latter year. He was appointed a justice in eyre (itinerant justice) in 1276 and a justice of the Court of Common Pleas (Ireland) shortly afterwards.

He was elected Bishop of Ferns in 1282 and consecrated in 1283. One historian states that he has left little trace in the history of the Diocese. However, a complaint from Bishop Richard to the Lord Chancellor of England in 1285 survives, alleging that the liberties of the Church were being infringed by the hearing of a probate case in the civil courts (such cases were then governed by ecclesiastical law, and were dealt with exclusively in the Church courts).

During the contest in 1299 between rival candidates for the office of Archbishop of Dublin, both candidates complained that Richard was taking advantage of the vacancy by attempting to exercise the functions of Archbishop, but the controversy died down with the appointment of a third candidate as Archbishop.

He died on 13 January 1304 and was buried in Ferns Cathedral.

== Sources ==
- Ball, F. Elrington The Judges in Ireland 1221-1921 London, John Murray, 1926
- D'Alton, John Memoirs of the Archbishops of Dublin Dublin, Hodges and Smith, 1838
- Grattan Flood, W.H. History of the Diocese of Ferns Waterford, Downey and Co., 1916
- UK National Archives SC/1/24/32 Richard de Northampton, Bishop of Ferns to Robert Burnell, Bishop of Bath and Wells, Chancellor, 14 May 1285
