= Alexander Devereux =

Alexander Devereux was a 16th-century bishop in Ireland.

He was the last Abbot of Dunbrody Abbey. An appointment of, Henry VIII he was consecrated Bishop of Ferns at St Patrick's Cathedral, Dublin on 14 December 1539. He died in post at Fethard-on-Sea in 1566.
