= Robert Grave =

Anglican priest (d. 1600)

Robert Grave was an Anglican priest in the last years of the sixteenth century.

Born in Kent, he was educated at Cambridge University. He was appointed Dean of Cork in 1590; Precentor of Limerick in 1591; Precentor of Christ Church Cathedral, Dublin in 1595; and Bishop of Ferns and Leighlin in July 1600. He and his family were drowned in Dublin Bay in October that year.

Church of Ireland titles
Preceded by Thomas Long	Dean of Cork; 1590–1600	Succeeded by Thomas Ram
Preceded by Hugh Allen (bishop)	Bishop of Ferns and Leighlin; July1600 – October1600	Succeeded by Nicholas Statford
