= Humphrey Ellison =

Irish Anglican cleric

Humphrey Eakins Ellison was Dean of Ferns from 1896 until 1897: His son and grandson son were both eminent scholars.

== Notes ==
Church of Ireland titles
Preceded by Charles Hind	Dean of Ferns; 1896–1897	Succeeded by Jonathan Sisson Cooper
