= William Codd =

Roman-catholic bishop

William Codd, Doctor of Divinity (b Wexford 6 July 1864; d Enniscorthy 12 March 1938) was an Irish Roman Catholic Bishop.

Codd was educated at St Peter's College, Wexford; and the Irish College, Rome. He was ordained priest on 24 April 1889. and appointed a teacher at his old school, rising to be its head. In 1912 he became Parish Priest at Blackwater, County Wexford. He was the Bishop of Ferns from 1917 until his death.

Catholic Church titles
Preceded by James Browne	Bishop of Ferns; 1917–1938	Succeeded by James Staunton
