= Henry Newland =

Irish clergyman

- Born: c. 1796
- Died: 7 March 1862
- Education: Trinity College Dublin
- Occupation: Anglican clergyman
- Known for: Serving as Dean of Ferns
- Title: Dean of Ferns
- Predecessor: Peter Browne
- Successor: Hamilton Verschoyle

Henry Newland (c. 1796 – 7 March 1862) was an Anglican clergyman in the Church of Ireland. He was the incumbent at Gorey and Dean of Ferns from 1842 until his death at age 66.

Church of Ireland titles
Preceded by Peter Browne	Dean of Ferns; 1842–1862	Succeeded by Hamilton Verschoyle
