= John of St John =

Irish clergyman and bishop

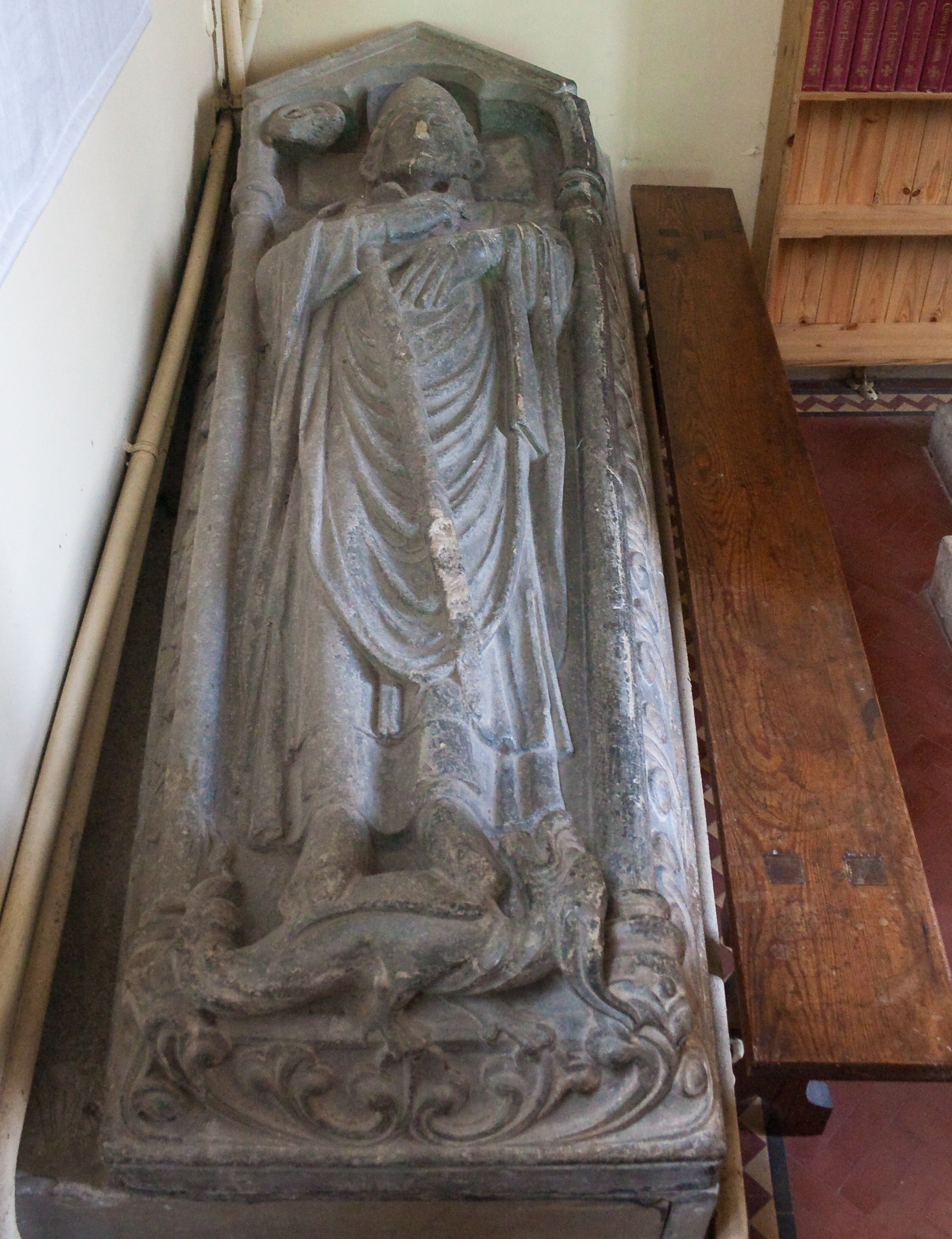
Tomb of John of St John, Ferns Cathedral, County Wexford, mid 13th-century

John of St John (died 1253) was an English-born clergyman in Ireland who held office as Bishop of Ferns.

He was born in England and first traveled to Ireland in 1212 as a Royal clerk in the Exchequer of Ireland, whereby he gained great knowledge of the Irish public finances. He was granted the manor of Newcastle Lyons in South Dublin. He was appointed bishop in 1223, being noteworthy as the first English Bishop of Ferns: there had previously been an unsuccessful effort to make him Bishop of Ossory. He may have died in 1243, but it was more likely in 1253.

He was Lord High Treasurer of Ireland 1217-1232, and a member of the Privy Council of Ireland from 1219, and was valued for his expert knowledge of the Irish finances. He visited England to discuss the state of Irish affairs with the English Crown. In 1229 the English judge and diplomat Sir Richard Duket, who had some knowledge of the Irish administration, was sent to Ireland to work with him "to preserve the rights of the Irish Exchequer". He also relied on the expert advice of another English-born cleric, Ralph de Norwich, who was later an unsuccessful candidate for Archbishop of Dublin. In 1230 the Exchequer was able to send the English Crown 2000 marks, the result of a highly successful tax of one-sixteenth on ecclesiastical benefices. St John also acted as a justice in eyre, and as Chief Escheator for Ireland.

He was a political figure of considerable importance until about 1236. In later life he faded from public eye, and his precise date of death is uncertain, although it was probably in the summer of 1253.
