= Hugh Allen (bishop) =

Anglican bishop

Hugh Allen was an Anglican bishop in the second half of the sixteenth century.

An Englishman, he was appointed Bishop of Down and Connor on 21 November 1573; and translated to Ferns on 24 May 1582. He died at Fethard in 1599.

Church of Ireland titles
Preceded by John Merriman	Bishop of Down and Connor; 1573–1582	Succeeded by Edward Edgeworth
Preceded by See vacant	Bishop of Ferns; 1582–1597	Succeeded by See merged
Preceded by Sees merged	Bishop of Ferns and Leighlin; 1597–1599	Succeeded by Robert Grave
