= John Watson (priest, died 1665) =

Irish Anglican cleric

John Creighton, was a 17th-century Anglican Dean in Ireland.

Watson was educated at Trinity College, Dublin. He was the Vicar of Kilcloney from 1624 to 1628; Treasurer of Armagh from 1628 to 1634;Rector of Mullaghbrack from 1628 until 1662; Dean of Ferns from 1662 until his death in 1665; and Chancellor of Lismore from 1663.
