= Thomas Dene =

Thomas Dene was an Irishman who was Bishop of Ferns from 1363 to 1400.

Formerly Archdeacon of Ferns, he was consecrated bishop on 18 June 1363. He died on 27 August 1400.
