= Simon de Hale =

Simon de Hale (died after 1240) was a trusted and long-serving Crown official in the reign of King Henry III of England. He served as the Sheriff of two English counties, and as an itinerant justice in both England and Ireland.

He was probably born in Hale, Northamptonshire (Hale, now long deserted, adjoined Apethorpe), and inherited land at Earls Barton in the same county from his cousin John de Buketon in about 1218: the King as a mark of favour gave him twelve royal oaks to build a house at Barton. He also held extensive lands in Yorkshire.

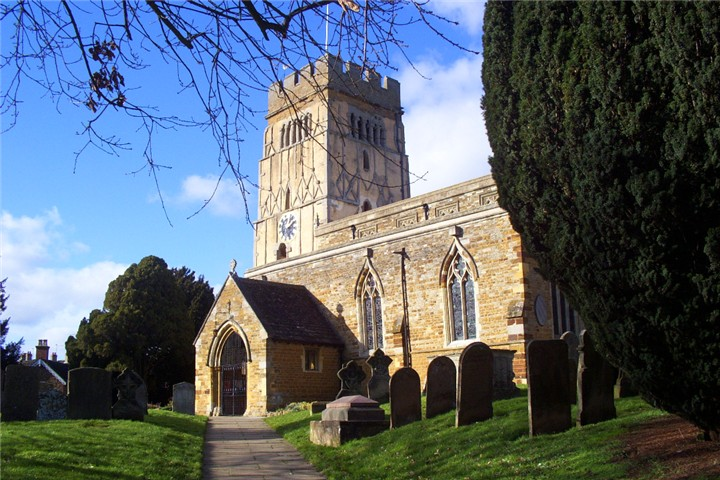
Earls Barton, Northamptonshire: Simon inherited property here

He served as Sheriff of Yorkshire for several years in the early 1220s, and as Sheriff of Wiltshire in 1226. He clearly discharged his duties efficiently, although it seems that in 1228 he still owed the King repayment of certain debts which he had collected in his official capacity. From 1224 Simon was regularly chosen, along with Sir Richard Duket, who also later served as a judge in Ireland, to act as an itinerant justice, with a salary of twenty marks a year. His circuit eventually extended over most of Eastern England. He and Duket may also have sat as royal judges at Westminster, and appear to have enjoyed seniority over their colleagues. Unlike many judges of the time he may have been a professional lawyer. The eminent jurist Henry de Bracton thought poorly of Richard Duket's judicial ability, calling him an "unwise and unlearned" man who had become a judge without being properly versed in the law, but is not known to have made any criticism of Hale. Bracton, who was a judge by 1245, may have known both Hale and Duket personally.

Hale was a tax assessor in two counties in 1227. The following year he was sent to Ireland to act as a justice itinerant, but he does not seem to have served in Ireland for long. He returned to England, possibly in 1232, but his name disappears from the records until 1240, when he was once more acting as a justice in Yorkshire. His date of death is not recorded.

== Sources ==
- Ball, F. Elrington The Judges in Ireland 1221-1921 London John Murray 1926
- Foss, Edward The Judges of England London Longman Brown Green and Longmans 1848 Volume 2
- Harding, Alan England in the Thirteenth Century Cambridge University Press 1993
