= Thomas McFall =

Irish Anglican cleric

Thomas Henry Crampton McFall (23 June 1913 – 16 August 1986) was Dean of Ferns from 1949 until 1979.

McFall was born in 1913, educated at Trinity College, Dublin and ordained in 1938. After a curacy at Cashel Cathedral he was the incumbent at Fiddown until his appointment as Dean.

== Notes ==
Church of Ireland titles
Preceded by Alfred Forbes	Dean of Ferns; 1949–1979	Succeeded by David Kaye Lee Earl
