= John Merriman (bishop) =

16th-century Anglican bishop

John Merriman was an Anglican bishop in the second half of the sixteenth century.

An Englishman, he was Chaplain to Elizabeth I of England before his consecration as Bishop of Down and Connor on 19 January 1568. He died in post in 1572.

Church of Ireland titles
Preceded by James MacCawell	Bishop of Down and Connor; 1568–1572	Succeeded by Hugh Allen
