= Hamilton Verschoyle =

Irish Anglican bishop

Hamilton Verschoyle (3 April 1803 – 29 January 1870) was a 19th-century Irish Anglican bishop who served as Bishop of Kilmore, Elphin and Ardagh from 1862 to his death.

The Verschoyles were of Dutch Huguenot origin who fled to Ireland in 1568 to escape religious persecution and quickly became prominent in Dublin.

Hamilton Verschoyle was the third son of John Verschoyle of Cashelshanaghan, County Donegal, and Henrietta Preston. He was educated at Oswestry School and Trinity College, Dublin and ordained in 1829. His first post was that of Curate at Newtownforbes after which he was the incumbent at the Episcopal Chapel, Upper Baggot Street in Dublin. Promoted to be the Chancellor of Dublin Cathedral in 1855, he also served on its Diocesan Education Board and was briefly Dean of Ferns before his appointment to the episcopate as the third Bishop of Kilmore. He was dubbed a "judicious, but by no means a brilliant preacher" in 1867.

His grave is at the Parish Church in Paignton, Devon, England where he is noted as dying in Torquay, on 28 Jan 1870, as the 42nd Bishop of Kilmore.

He married Catherine Margaret Hawkins, daughter and co-heiress of Rev. Thomas Hawkins of Ballybodonnell. Their son, Rev. Hamilton Stuart Verschoyle, received the Cross of the Crown of Italy in 1888 for public services. He married Frances Frederica Goold, the daughter and eventual co-heiress of the Venerable Frederick Goold, Archdeacon of Raphoe and brother of Wyndham Goold, MP for Limerick, (1850–54). The Ven. Archdeacon Goold had been disinherited by his father, Master of the Court of Chancery Thomas Goold, for marrying Catherine Newcomen (whose illegitimate sister was Theresa, Countess of Eglinton and Winton), but inherited the family estate following the death of his brother. Hamilton Stuart's son, Hamilton Frederick Stuart Verschoyle, assumed the arms and name of his grandfather, changing the name to Goold-Verschoyle in 1900.

== Arms ==
Coat of arms of Hamilton Verschoyle

Notes
Confirmed on 14 April 1888 by Sir John Bernard Burke, Ulster King of Arms.
Crest
A boar's head couped Gules charged with a cross pattee as in the amrs.
Escutcheon
Argent on a chevron between three boars' heads couped Gules a cross pattee Or.
Motto
Temperans Et Constans

Church of Ireland titles
Preceded by Henry Newland	Dean of Ferns; March 1862– May 1862	Succeeded by Thomas Brownell Gibson
Preceded by Marcus Beresford	Bishop of Kilmore, Elphin and Ardagh; 1863–1870	Succeeded by Charles Leslie
