= Anthony Proctor =

Anthony Proctor was a 17th-century Anglican Dean in Ireland.

Proctor was Prebendary of Donoughmore in St Patrick's Cathedral, Dublin and Dean of Ferns from 1643 to 1661. Rector of Mullaghbrack from 1628 until 1662; Dean of Ferns from 1662 until his death in 1665;
