= Charles Hind (priest) =

Charles Hind (1827–1896) was Dean of Ferns from 1892 until 1896.

Hind was educated at Trinity College, Dublin and ordained in 1851. After curacies in Rotherhithe, Stapenhill and Bolton he was Vicar of Silloth from 1872 until 1877 and then Rector of Ferns until his appointment as Dean.

He died on 2 August 1896. His son was also an Anglican priest.

== Notes ==
Church of Ireland titles
Preceded by John Dowse	Dean of Ferns; 1892–1896	Succeeded by Humphrey Eakins Ellison
