= Preban =

Civil parish and townland in County Wicklow, Ireland

Coordinates: 52°50′38″N 6°23′49″W

Preban is a civil parish and townland in County Wicklow, Ireland. Preban townland, which has an area of approximately 1.12 square kilometres (0.43 sq mi), had a population of 54 people as of the 2011 census. The Record of Monuments and Places records an ecclesiastical enclosure, ruined church and graveyard, as well as a number of other possible hut and enclosure sites, within Preban townland.

Preban's Church of Ireland church, dedicated to Saint John and built in 1827, is in the townland of Tomcoyle. Listed by Wicklow County Council as a protected structure, it is a church of Tinahely Carnew Parish within the Church of Ireland Diocese of Cashel, Ferns and Ossory.
