= David Earl (priest) =

Irish Anglican clergyman

David Kaye Lee Earl (18 August 1928 – 31 March 2017) was an Anglican clergyman who was Dean of Ferns from 1979 until 1994.

== Biography ==
Earl was born in 1928, educated at Trinity College, Dublin and ordained in 1956. After a curacy at Chapelizod he held incumbencies at Rathkeale and Killarney until his appointment as Dean. He died in Waterford on 31 March 2017, at the age of 88.

== Notes ==
Church of Ireland titles
Preceded by Thomas Henry Crampton McFall	Dean of Ferns; 1979–1994	Succeeded by Leslie David Arthur Forrest
