= Robert Wilson (dean of Ferns) =

Irish Anglican cleric

Robert Wilson was a 17th-century Anglican Dean in Ireland.

Wilson was educated at Trinity College, Dublin. He was appointed a prebendary of Ferns Cathedral in 1626, a post he held until 1643. He was a prebendary of St Patrick's Cathedral, Dublin from 1630.
