= George Ley (priest) =

George Ley was Dean of Cork from 1605 to 1628.

Ley was educated at Trinity College, Dublin. He had previously been Archdeacon of Down.
