= Jonathan Cooper (priest) =

Irish Anglican cleric (1845–1896)

Jonathan Sisson Cooper (1845 – 1896) was Dean of Ferns from 1897 until his death on 18 February 1898. The son of Very Rev. Jonathan Sisson Cooper (1820-1898), Rector of Killanne, Co. Wexford, and Rosetta Louise Cooper, he was educated at Rathmines College. Served as Rector of Coolock.

Alfred William Francis Cooper, Archdeacon of Calgary from 1895 to 1898, was his son.

== Notes ==
Church of Ireland titles
| Preceded by Humphrey Eakins Ellison | Dean of Ferns; 1897–1898 | Succeeded by John Alexander |
