= Thomas Sawbridge =

Thomas Sawbridge was Dean of Ferns from 1728 until his death on 30 May 1733.

Sawbridge was born in Melton Mowbray and educated at Emmanuel College, Cambridge. He was incorporated at Oxford on 10 July 1677. He held Livings at Lowesby, South Croxton, Knaptoft and Gilmorton.

== Notes ==
Church of Ireland titles
| Preceded by Pascal Ducasse | Dean of Ferns; 1728–1733 | Succeeded by George Stone |
