= Fethard-on-Sea =

Village in County Wexford, Ireland

Fethard-on-Sea Fiodh Ard (Irish) Fethard
- Village
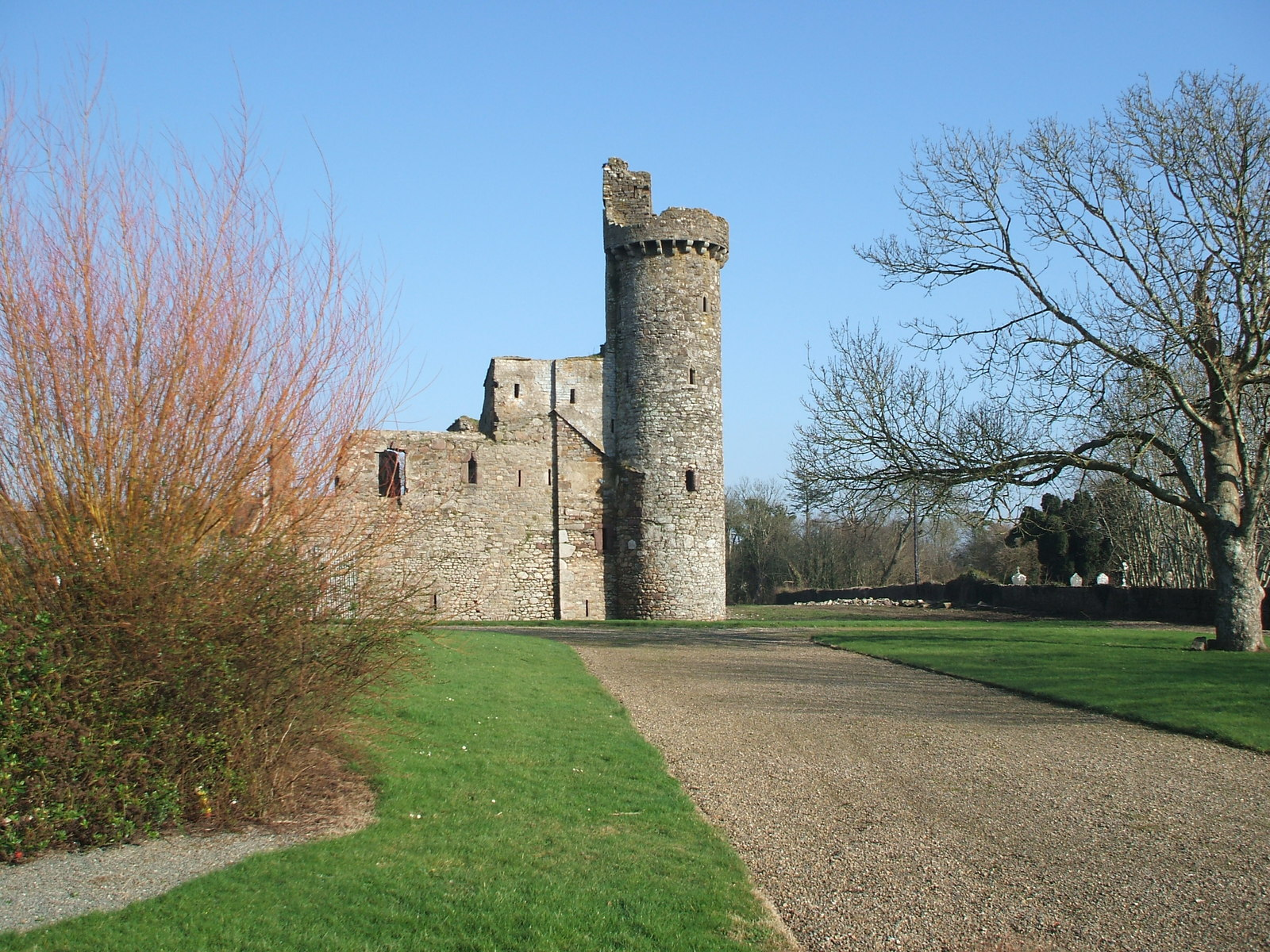
- Fethard Castle

- Location in Ireland
- Coordinates: 52.195°N 6.833°W
- Country: Ireland
- Province: Leinster
- County: Wexford
- Elevation: 15 m (49 ft)

Population (2016)
  - Total: 311
- Irish Grid Reference: S793049

Fethard-on-Sea or Fethard (Irish: Fiodh Ard, meaning 'high wood') is a village in southwest County Wexford, Ireland. It lies on the R734 road on the eastern side of the Hook Peninsula, between Waterford Harbour and Bannow Bay. The village had a population of 311 as of the 2016 census.

The village is in Fethard civil parish and partly in a townland of the same name. It lies in the Fethard electoral district in the Wexford constituency. It is in the Templetown parish in the Roman Catholic Diocese of Ferns. Its main industries are fishing and tourism.

== Name ==
The English name Fethard derives from the Irish fiodh árd, meaning "wooded height". Long known simply as Fethard, the village became known as Fethard-on-Sea following events in 1914 when the lifeboat Helen Blake capsized. Nine of the lifeboat's fourteen-man crew were drowned during a service mission to the schooner Mexico off the Keeragh Islands. There was an outpouring of sympathy for the village and charitable donations were posted from around the world. To avoid this post from being misdirected to Fethard, County Tipperary, the name of the Fethard in County Wexford was reputedly changed to better distinguish the two.

== History ==
=== Early history ===
Evidence of ancient settlement in the area includes a number of ringfort, enclosure and promontory fort sites in the townlands of Fethard, Ramstown, Connagh and An Ráth (Ralph).

In the 12th century, Baginbun near Fethard was the site of Norman landings during the Norman invasion of Ireland. The remains of Norman-era earthworks and fortifications may be seen at Baginbun Bay, south of Ingard Point.

A 13th-century castle and motte was built at Fethard by Raymond le Gros. This later passed to the Bishop of Ferns and was used as an episcopal residence. While there is little evidence of this structure today, the remains of Fethard Castle, built in phases during the 14th and 15th centuries, stand nearby within the village. This castle was associated with the Loftus family, of nearby Loftus Hall, from the 17th century.

Alexander Devereux, the 16th-century bishop of Ferns and Abbot of Dunbrody, is buried in St. Mogue's Church of Ireland church.

Fethard was granted a charter by James I, and became a municipal borough, with the parliamentary borough of Fethard sending two members to the Irish House of Commons until its dissolution in 1801. The seats were in the control of the Marquess of Ely.

=== Quay and lifeboat ===
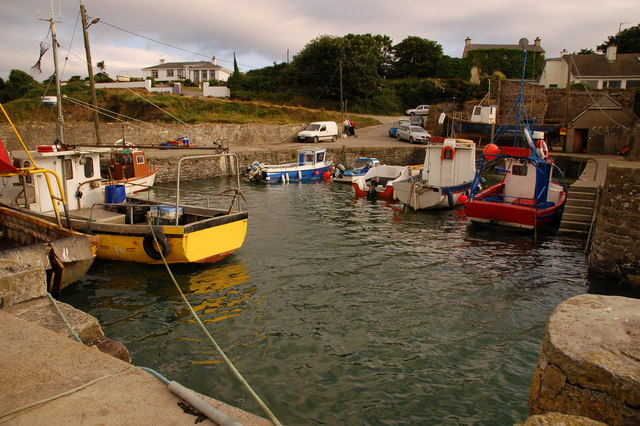
Fethard Quay

Fethard Quay was built in Ramstown townland during the first half of the 18th century. The quay, which was boarded by British Navy vessels during the 1798 Rebellion, was repaired c. 1800 and again in 1849.

The Royal National Lifeboat Institution opened Fethard Lifeboat Station, also in Ramstown, in 1886. Nine of the volunteer crew were killed while trying to save the crew of a Norwegian ship that had run aground at South Keeragh Island on 20 February 1914. The survivors of both crews were marooned on the island for two nights before they could be rescued. While the 19th century lifeboat station was later closed, a new inshore lifeboat station was opened nearby during the 1990s.

=== Fethard-on-Sea boycott ===
In May 1957, Roman Catholic villagers ("incited by the local curate") boycotted Protestant-owned local businesses in response to the actions of a Protestant woman, Sheila Cloney, who had left her Catholic husband and the village, to avoid being obliged to send her children to the local Catholic school. The boycott received national and international attention before it concluded. The family was reconciled, with the daughters being home-schooled.

A film was made about the Cloney family and boycott. Released in 1999, A Love Divided starred Orla Brady and Liam Cunningham. A review of the film by the American Catholic League organisation questioned the film's depiction of the Catholic Church in Ireland.

== Amenities ==
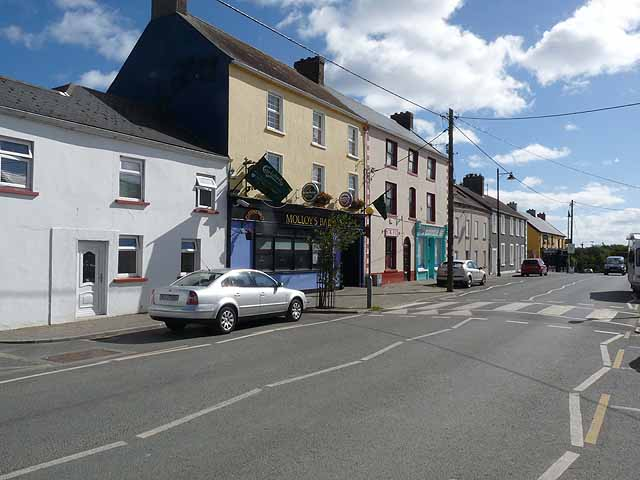
High Street, Fethard

There are three public houses in the village, a grocery shop and a number of cafes, B&B and a hotel that was refurbished and reopened in 2019.

As of October 2026, Fethard is served TFI Local Link route 399. The area was previously served by Bus Eireann Route 373 until it was cut in May 2026.

== Notable people ==
- Mervyn A. Ellison (1909–1963), Irish astronomer
- Tom Neville (1939–2018), Wexford hurler

== See also ==
- Hook Head
- List of towns and villages in Ireland
