= John Dowse (priest) =

Irish priest

John Robert Dowse (c. 1815 – 20 October 1892) was Dean of Ferns from 1879 until his death.

He was born in Wexford, the son of Richard Dowse. He attended Trinity College Dublin, earning his BA in 1838 and MA in 1879.

His youngest son Charles Dowse was an Anglican bishop in the first half of the 20th century.

== Notes ==
Church of Ireland titles
Preceded by William Atkins	Dean of Ferns; 1892–1892	Succeeded by Charles Hind
