= Jonathan Cooper (bioengineer) =

English bioengineer (born 1961)

Jonathan Cooper FREng FRSE
- Born: Jonathan Mark Cooper; 22 June 1961 (age 65)
- Education: University of Southampton (BSc); University of Oxford (PhD)
- Awards: Fellow of the Royal Society of Edinburgh (2001); Fellow of the Royal Academy of Engineering (2004)
- Scientific career
- Fields: Bioengineering; Medical diagnosis; Microfluidics; Optics; Holography
- Workplaces: University of Glasgow
- Website: www.gla.ac.uk/schools/engineering/staff/jonathancooper/

Jonathan Cooper FREng FRSE (born 22 June 1961) is Professor of Engineering in the College of Science & Engineering at the University of Glasgow. Professor Cooper has held the Wolfson Chair in Bioengineering at the school since 2009.

== Research and career ==
After graduating from a PhD at the University of Oxford, Cooper was employed as a lecturer at the University of Glasgow in 1991. He was awarded the title of Professor in 1998, becoming the youngest person to have been awarded the position at the university at the time. He was elected as a Fellow of the Royal Society of Edinburgh in 2001 and a Fellow of the Royal Academy of Engineering in 2004. In 2008 he was made the Wolfson Professor of Bioengineering, a position which he currently holds.

Cooper lectures undergraduate and masters programs on electronics and biomedical engineering at the University of Glasgow. In 2012 he established University of Glasgow’s degree programme in Biomedical Engineering, which was the first of its kind in Scotland. He has supervised over 40 PhD students since 1996, and was the leader of the EPSRC-funded Doctoral Training Centre in Bioengineering from 2006 to 2017.

As of June 2021 Cooper’s research has been published over 265 times in peer-reviewed journals such as Nature, PNAS, Lab on a Chip and Chemical Communications. He has developed techniques in a range of disciplines including lab-on-a-chip diagnostics, cell measurements and proteomics. His work has been recognised by many invited/plenary lectures at international conferences, including Microfluidics and Nano-fluidics, the European Congress of Lab-on-a-Chip, micro-Flu, European Congress of Lab-on-a-Chip and Asia Pacific Congress on Lab-on-a-Chip.

== Field research ==
Cooper’s research in microfluidics includes the development of low-cost “origami” lateral flow diagnostics, which use folded paper to control the mixing of diagnostic reagents. This technique has been trialled for field use in several low-resource locations including Vietnam, for the early detection of sepsis, and in Uganda for the detection of tropical diseases such as malaria and schistosomiasis.

== Awards and honours ==
- Elected Fellow of the Scotland’s National Academy of Science & Arts, Royal Society of Edinburgh (2001)
- Elected Fellow of the UK’s National Physics Academy, Institute of Physics (2003)
- Elected Fellow of the UK’s National Electronics Academy, Institute of Electrical Engineering (2003)
- Elected Fellow of the UK’s National Engineering Academy, Royal Academy of Engineering (2004)
- Royal Society Merit Award (2010)

== Selected publications ==
- Moreddu, Rosalia; Elsherif, Mohamed; Adams, Hadie; Moschou, Despina; Cordeiro, Maria F.; Wolffsohn, James S.; Vigolo, Daniele; Butt, Haider; Cooper, Jonathan M.; Yetisen, Ali K. (2020). "Integration of paper microfluidic sensors into contact lenses for tear fluid analysis". Lab on a Chip. 20 (21): 3970–3979. doi:10.1039/D0LC00438C. ISSN 1473-0197. PMID 32944726. S2CID 221787094.
- Ray, Aniruddha; Khalid, Muhammad Arslan; Demčenko, Andriejus; Daloglu, Mustafa; Tseng, Derek; Reboud, Julien; Cooper, Jonathan M.; Ozcan, Aydogan (December 2020). "Holographic detection of nanoparticles using acoustically actuated nanolenses". Nature Communications. 11 (1): 171. Bibcode:2020NatCo..11..171R. doi:10.1038/s41467-019-13802-1. ISSN 2041-1723. PMC 6965092. PMID 31949134.
- Reboud, Julien; Xu, Gaolian; Garrett, Alice; Adriko, Moses; Yang, Zhugen; Tukahebwa, Edridah M.; Rowell, Candia; Cooper, Jonathan M. (2019-03-12). "Paper-based microfluidics for DNA diagnostics of malaria in low resource underserved rural communities". Proceedings of the National Academy of Sciences. 116 (11): 4834–4842. Bibcode:2019PNAS..116.4834R. doi:10.1073/pnas.1812296116. ISSN 0027-8424. PMC 6421471. PMID 30782834.
- Simon, Gergely; Pailhas, Yan; Andrade, Marco A. B.; Reboud, Julien; Marques-Hueso, Jose; Desmulliez, Marc P. Y.; Cooper, Jonathan M.; Riehle, Mathis O.; Bernassau, Anne L. (2018-07-23). "Particle separation in surface acoustic wave microfluidic devices using reprogrammable, pseudo-standing waves". Applied Physics Letters. 113 (4): 044101. Bibcode:2018ApPhL.113d4101S. doi:10.1063/1.5035261. ISSN 0003-6951. S2CID 55580684.
- Yang, Zhugen; Xu, Gaolian; Reboud, Julien; Ali, Syed Atif; Kaur, Gurpreet; McGiven, John; Boby, Nongthombam; Gupta, Praveen K.; Chaudhuri, Pallab; Cooper, Jonathan M. (2018-02-23). "Rapid Veterinary Diagnosis of Bovine Reproductive Infectious Diseases from Semen Using Paper-Origami DNA Microfluidics". ACS Sensors. 3 (2): 403–409. doi:10.1021/acssensors.7b00825. ISSN 2379-3694. PMID 29322764. S2CID 3456643.
- Barrett, Michael P.; Cooper, Jonathan M.; Regnault, Clément; Holm, Stefan H.; Beech, Jason P.; Tegenfeldt, Jonas O.; Hochstetter, Axel (2017-10-05). "Microfluidics-Based Approaches to the Isolation of African Trypanosomes". Pathogens. 6 (4): 47. doi:10.3390/pathogens6040047. ISSN 2076-0817. PMC 5750571. PMID 28981471.
- Tassieri, Manlio; Giudice, Francesco Del; Robertson, Emma J.; Jain, Neena; Fries, Bettina; Wilson, Rab; Glidle, Andrew; Greco, Francesco; Netti, Paolo Antonio; Maffettone, Pier Luca; Bicanic, Tihana (August 2015). "Microrheology with Optical Tweezers: Measuring the relative viscosity of solutions 'at a glance'". Scientific Reports. 5 (1): 8831. Bibcode:2015NatSR...5E8831T. doi:10.1038/srep08831. ISSN 2045-2322. PMC 4894396. PMID 25743468.
- Menachery, Anoop; Kremer, Clemens; Wong, Pui E.; Carlsson, Allan; Neale, Steven L.; Barrett, Michael P.; Cooper, Jonathan M. (December 2012). "Counterflow Dielectrophoresis for Trypanosome Enrichment and Detection in Blood". Scientific Reports. 2 (1): 775. Bibcode:2012NatSR...2E.775M. doi:10.1038/srep00775. ISSN 2045-2322. PMC 3481117. PMID 23105971.
- Bourquin, Yannyk; Reboud, Julien; Wilson, Rab; Zhang, Yi; Cooper, Jonathan M. (2011). "Integrated immunoassay using tuneable surface acoustic waves and lensfree detection". Lab on a Chip. 11 (16): 2725–2730. doi:10.1039/c1lc20320g. ISSN 1473-0197. PMID 21725557.
- Zarowna-Dabrowska, Alicja; Neale, Steven L.; Massoubre, David; McKendry, Jonathan; Rae, Bruce R.; Henderson, Robert K.; Rose, Mervyn J.; Yin, Huabing; Cooper, Jonathan M.; Gu, Erdan; Dawson, Martin D. (2011-01-31). "Miniaturized optoelectronic tweezers controlled by GaN micro-pixel light emitting diode arrays". Optics Express. 19 (3): 2720–2728. Bibcode:2011OExpr..19.2720Z. doi:10.1364/OE.19.002720. hdl:10072/52462. ISSN 1094-4087. PMID 21369093.
- Wilson, Rab; Reboud, Julien; Bourquin, Yannyk; Neale, Steven L.; Zhang, Yi; Cooper, Jonathan M. (2011). "Phononic crystal structures for acoustically driven microfluidic manipulations". Lab Chip. 11 (2): 323–328. doi:10.1039/C0LC00234H. ISSN 1473-0197. PMID 21057690.
- Bourquin, Yannyk; Reboud, Julien; Wilson, Rab; Cooper, Jonathan M. (2010). "Tuneable surface acoustic waves for fluid and particle manipulations on disposable chips". Lab on a Chip. 10 (15): 1898–2701. doi:10.1039/c004506c. ISSN 1473-0197. PMID 20535420.
- Jordan, Pamela; Leach, Jonathan; Padgett, Miles; Blackburn, Paul; Isaacs, Neil; Goksör, Mattias; Hanstorp, Dag; Wright, Amanda; Girkin, John; Cooper, Jonathan (2005). "Creating permanent 3D arrangements of isolated cells using holographic optical tweezers". Lab on a Chip. 5 (11): 1224–1228. doi:10.1039/b509218c. ISSN 1473-0197. PMID 16234944.
