= John Devereux (bishop) =

John Devereux was a 16th-century religious leader in Ireland.

He was Dean of Ferns from 1559 to 1569 (the last three years in commendam); and Bishop of Ferns from 1566 until his death in 1578.
