= William Atkins (doctor) =

English quack

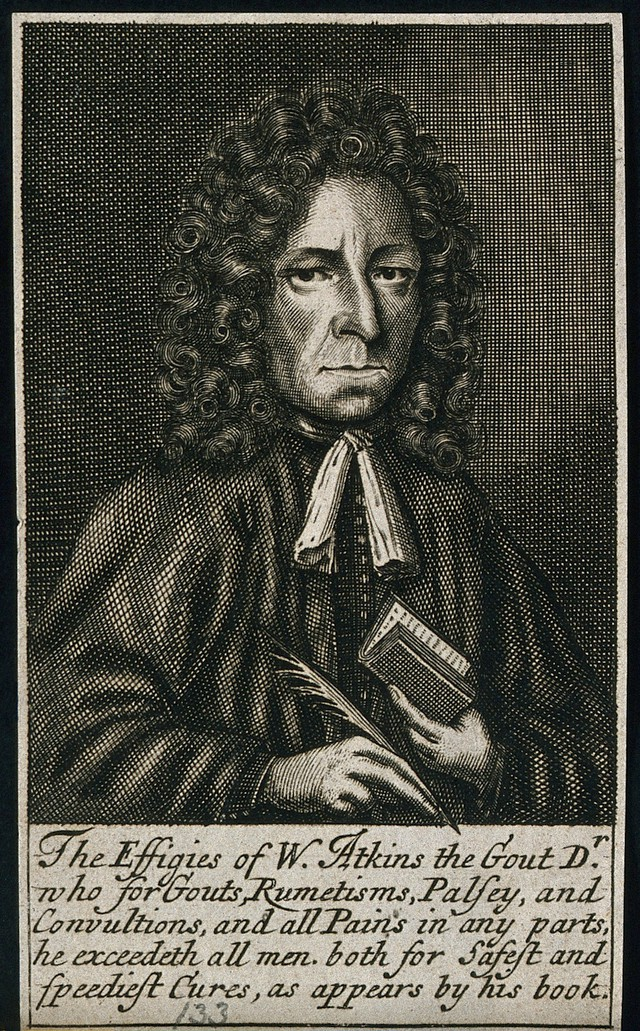
Portrait of William Atkins attached to his Discourse (1694).

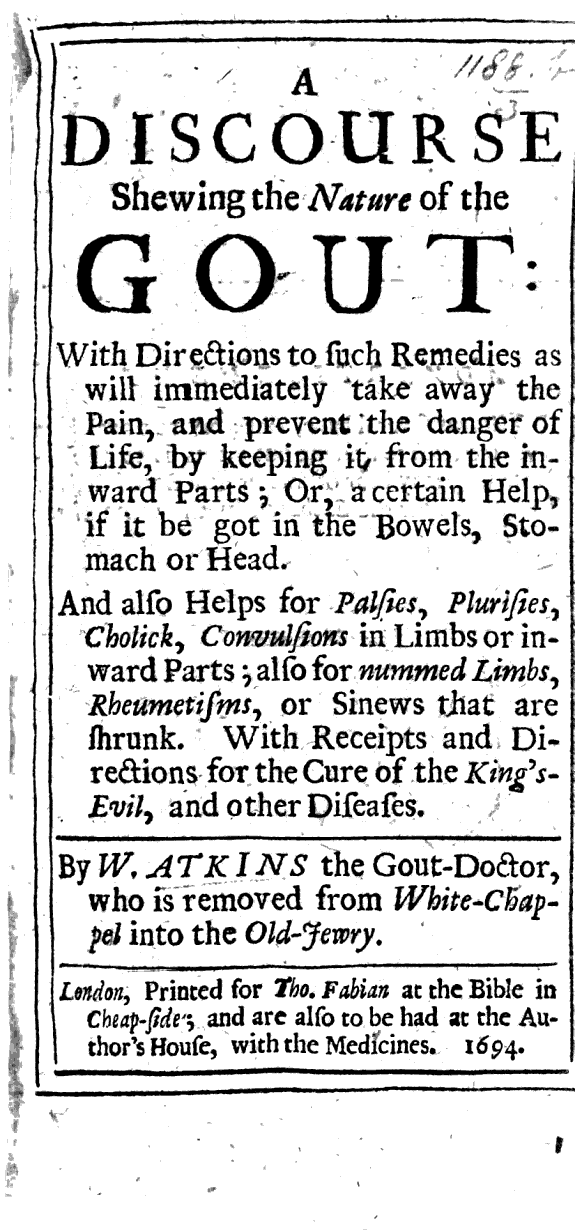
Atkins' A Discourse Shewing the Nature of the Gout (1694).

William Atkins (fl. 1694) was an English quack of the Restoration period. He gained some fame and wealth for his supposed cure of gout, the subject of his only published work: A Discourse Shewing the Nature of the Gout (1694).

== Life ==
Atkins originally lived on Old Bailey, but later moved to Whitechapel and then, by 1694, to Old Jewry. He worked as a doctor, handing out flyers advertising his medical abilities. According to one biographer, these bills "exceeded all others in extravagant assertions and impudence." Atkins professed to be able to, with his "renovating elixir", restore "pristine youth and vigour to the patient, however old or decayed". Atkins did not shy away from extravagant claims in his advertisements. Among the ailments he claimed to have the cure for were mental disability and infertility. He even recounted a tale in which he revived a woman from a "fit of the dead-palsy", after which she returned to perfect motor control. He described himself as a modern-day Solomon.

Atkins' main claim to fame was as a specialist doctor for gout. This specialty brought Atkins some renown and wealth, and was the subject of his only published work: A discourse shewing the nature of the gout with directions to such remedies as will immediately take away the pain (London, 1694). According to the title page, this book was printed for Thomas Fabian, to be sold at the Bible and Three Crowns, a bookshop at the lower end of Cheapside, but also up for sale at Atkins' house alongside his medicines. The advertisement to the work also noted, for any prospective clients, that "they may hear of me at any Bookseller's or Coffee-House near the Exchange, by the name of the Gout-Doctor". Atkins never purchased a coach for his own use, as would be expected of a man of his wealth, rather traveling on the public Hackney coaches in an uncharacteristic show of humility.

James Caulfield described Atkins vividly in his Remarkable Persons (1819):

This wonderful great man was short in stature, fat, and waddled as he walked; he always wore a white three-tailed wig, nicely combed and frizzed upon each cheek. He generally carried a cane, but a hat never.

Atkins apparently printed his own likeness on flyers for his medical services, depicted as surrounded by instruments and souvenirs of his medical profession, including rotten teeth, pills, and gallipots. However, the only extant portrait of Atkins is an engraving of a solemn-looking Atkins attached to his Discourse (1694). Historians of medicine Roy Porter and George Rousseau have praised the author of this portrait for his realism, depicting Atkins as a "harbinger of bad news, [a] Hermes of Death, not merely the author of A Discourse Shewing the Nature of the Gout". Though this portraitist's name is not given, the National Portrait Gallery has tentatively identified them as Dutch print artist Frederick Hendrik van Hove.
