= Thomas Gibson (priest) =

Irish Anglican cleric

Thomas Brownell Gibson (17 March 1847 - 19 January 1927) was Dean of Ferns from 1908 until 1926.

Gibson born in County Meath and was educated at Trinity College, Dublin, qualifying with a BA in 1877 and MA in 1880 and ordained a deacon in 1876 and priest in 1877 (both in Cork). After curacies in St. Mary's Dunmanway Co Cork (Fanlobbus), and Dublin he became the Chaplain at The King's Hospital (1878-1896). He was then the Rector at Ferns, County Wexford from 1896 until 1925. He held the posts of Canon of Taghmon and Canon of Kilrain.

He was married to Annie Martin Gibson (from County Down), eighteen years his junior, and had three daughters born in Dublin.

== Notes ==
Church of Ireland titles
Preceded by John Alexander	Dean of Ferns; 1908–1926	Succeeded by Henry Cameron Lyster
