= Joseph Story (bishop) =

Joseph Story was an 18th-century Anglican bishop in Ireland.

Story was educated at Trinity College, Dublin. He was appointed Chaplain to the Irish House of Commons in 1731 and Dean of Ferns in 1734. He was appointed to the episcopate at Bishop of Killaloe in 1740 and translated to Kilmore in 1742. He died on 22 September 1757.

== In literature ==
An unnamed Bishop of Kilmore appears in the latter portion of the short story "The Ash-tree" by M.R. James, set in 1754. Whether this is a Roman Catholic or Church of Ireland bishop is not explicitly stated, but in context the latter is more probable; if so, this character would be Joseph Story, who held the see at that time. In the story, the bishop is a guest at the country house of Sir Richard Fell and participates in the investigation of his death.
