= Archdeacon of Ferns =

Province of Dublin
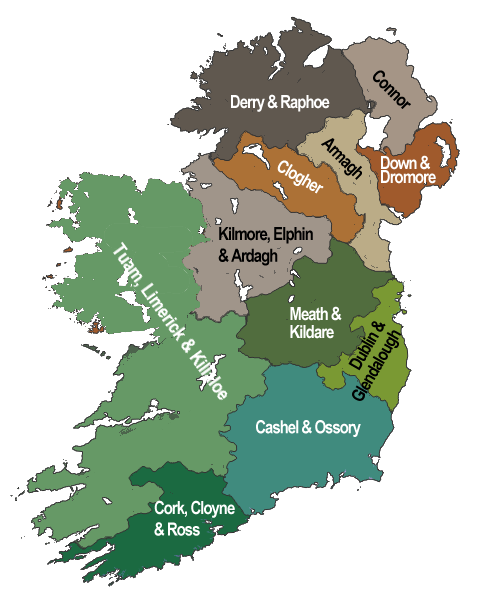
- Church: Church of Ireland
- Metropolitan bishop: Archbishop of Dublin
- Cathedral: Christ Church Cathedral, Dublin
- Dioceses: 5

The Archdeacon of Ferns is a senior ecclesiastical officer within the Church of Ireland. The Archdeacon is responsible for the disciplinary supervision of the clergy within the Ferns Diocese, now part of the Diocese of Cashel and Ossory.

The archdeaconry can trace its history from Reginald, the first known incumbent, who held the office between 1223 and 1230, to the current incumbent Bob Gray who was appointed in 2015.
