= Bishop of Ferns =

Episcopal title of Ireland

- Bishopric

catholic
- Coat of arms
- Incumbent; Gerard Nash; Since 11 June 2021
- Style: Your Grace

Location
- Country: Ireland

Information
- First holder: Ceallach Ua Colmáin
- Established: Early 12th century
- Cathedral: St. Aidan's Cathedral, Enniscorthy

Website
- ferns.ie

The Bishop of Ferns (Irish: Easpag Fhearna) is an episcopal title which takes its name after the village of Ferns in County Wexford, Ireland. In the Roman Catholic Church it remains a separate title, but in the Church of Ireland it has been united with other bishoprics.

== History ==
The diocese of Ferns or Loch Garman was one of the twenty-four dioceses established at the Synod of Rathbreasail in 1111. Subsequently, the centre of the diocese was located at Ferns due to the influence of Diarmaid mac Murchadha. It comprised roughly the ancient territory of the Uí Cheinnselaig with the bishop's seat (cathedra) located at Ferns Cathedral. During the later medieval period the church at New Ross enjoyed quasi-cathedral status.

Following the Reformation, there are parallel apostolic successions. In the Church of Ireland, Ferns was united with Leighlin in 1597 to form the bishopric of Ferns and Leighlin.

In the Roman Catholic Church, the bishopric of Ferns continues as a separate title. The current Incumbent is the Most Reverend Gerard Nash, Bishop of the Roman Catholic Diocese of Ferns, who was appointed by the Holy See on 11 June 2021 and was ordained bishop on 5 September 2021.

== Pre-Reformation bishops ==
List of pre-Reformation Bishops of Ferns
From	Until	Incumbent	Notes
unknown	1117	Ceallach Ua Colmáin	Died in office
unknown	1125	Máel Eoin Ua Dúnacaín	May have been bishop of Ferns or Leighlin, but was called bishop of Uí Chennselaig in the Annals of the Four Masters; died in office at Leighlin
fl. 1161–62	1182	Joseph Ua h-Áeda	Known to be bishop around 1160 and 1161; died in office
c.1186	1223	Ailbe Ua Maíl Mhuaidh, O.Cist.	Formerly Abbot of Baltinglass; elected bishop circa 1186; acted as a suffragan bishop in the diocese of Winchester in 1201 and 1214; died 1 January 1223; also known as Albinus, Albin O'Mooley and Alpin O'Moelmhuaidh
1223	1253	John of St John	Formerly Treasurer of Limerick; elected before 6 July 1223 and consecrated before 2 April 1224; died before October 1253. He was Lord High Treasurer of Ireland for many years
1254	1258	Geoffrey of St John	Formerly Treasurer of Limerick; elected before March 1254; received possession of the temporalities after 16 March 1254; died before May 1258; he was possibly brother of the previous bishop
1258	1282	Hugh of Lamport	Formerly Treasurer of Ferns Cathedral; elected before 11 July 1258; received possession of the temporalities 27 September 1258; died 15 May 1282
1282	1304	Richard of Northampton	Formerly a Canon of Killaloe and Dean of Ferns; elected 28 July 1282; received possession of the temporalities 13 October 1282; consecrated in 1283; died 13 January 1304 and buried in Ferns Cathedral
1304		Simon of Evesham	Elected after 12 March 1304; consecrated 22 June 1304; died 1 September 1304
1305	1311	Robert Walrand	Elected after 14 February 1305; consecrated after 13 April 1305; died 17 November 1311
1312	1346	Adam of Northampton	Elected before 14 March 1312; received possession of the temporalities 14 March 1312; consecrated 18 June 1312; died 29 October 1346
1347		Hugh of Saltu	Formerly a Canon of St Patrick's Cathedral, Dublin; elected before 10 March and consecrated 8 April 1347, but was deprived of the see later in the same year; also known as Hugh of Leixlip
1347	1348	Geoffrey Grandfield, O.E.S.A.	Appointed 5 March and consecrated at Avignon in June 1347; received possession of the temporalities 15 November 1347; died of the plague 22 October 1348; also known as Geoffrey Grosseld
1349		John Esmond	Elected and consecrated in 1349, but did not get possession of the see due to a prior papal reservation; deprived in the same year; later successively appointed Bishop of Emly on 28 February 1356
1350	1362	William Carnells, O.P.	Appointed 19 April and consecrated 1350; received possession of the temporalities 15 October 1350; also was Lord High Treasurer of Ireland; died in July 1362
1363	1400	Thomas Dene	Formerly Archdeacon of Ferns; appointed bishop before 15 April and consecrated 18 June 1363; received possession of the temporalities 27 August 1363; died 27 August 1400
1400	1415	Patrick Barrett, O.S.A.	Formerly a Canon of Kells Priory; appointed 10 December 1400 and consecrated in the same month; received possession of the temporalities 11 April 1401; also was Lord Chancellor of Ireland; died 10 November 1415
1418	1457	Robert Whittey	Formerly Precentor of Ferns Cathedral; appointed 16 February 1418; excused from further attendance at the Irish Parliament or the Privy Council in 1450, on account of his great age and infirmity; resigned 5 October 1457; died 1458
1451		Tadhg O'Beirn, O.S.A.	Appointed 8 October 1451, but did not take effect
1457	1479	John Purcell I	Appointed 4 October 1457; died before October 1479
1479	1503	Laurence Neville	Formerly a Canon of Ferns; appointed 26 October 1479 and received possession of the temporalities 20 May 1480; died 1503
1505	1509	Edmund Comerford	Formerly Dean of Kilkenny; consecrated at Ferns Cathedral in 1505; died 15 April 1509
1510	1519	Nicholas Comyn	Appointed bishop before 20 January 1510 and consecrated at St Paul's Cathedral, London on that date; translated to Waterford and Lismore in 1519
1519	1539	John Purcell II	Appointed 13 April and consecrated at Rome 6 May 1519; died 20 July 1539

== Post-Reformation bishops ==
=== Church of Ireland succession ===
List of Church of Ireland Bishops of Ferns
From	Until	Incumbent	Notes
1539	1566	Alexander Devereux ^{[A]}	Last Abbot of Dunbrody; elected bishop by the dean and chapter in 1539 and confirmed by King Henry VIII; consecrated at St Patrick's Cathedral, Dublin 14 December 1539; died in Fethard-on-Sea before 19 August 1566
1566	1578	John Devereux	Dean of Ferns; nominated 10 October and appointed by letters patent 19 October 1566; died in 1578 and was buried at St Mary's Church in Wexford
1579		(James Proctor)	Appointed by letters patent 11 April 1579, but died before consecration
1579	1582	See vacant	
1582	1597	Hugh Allen	Translated from Down and Connor; appointed by letters patent 24 May 1582; became Bishop of Ferns and Leighlin when the two dioceses where united in 1597.
In 1597, the Church of Ireland see became part of the united bishopric of Ferns and Leighlin

=== Roman Catholic succession ===
List of Roman Catholic Bishops of Ferns
From	Until	Incumbent	Notes
1539	1541	See vacant	
1541		Bernard Ó Dónaill, O.F.M	Appointed 30 March 1541; translated to Elphin 3 June 1541
1541	1542	Gabriel de S. Serio, O.S.B.	Translated from Elphin 3 June 1541; died 5 May 1542
unknown	1566	Alexander Devereux ^{[B]}	Appointed by King Henry VIII in 1539, but was not deprived in the reign of Queen Mary I; died in Fethard-on-Sea before 19 August 1566
1566	1582	See vacant	
1582	1587	Peter Power	Appointed 27 April 1582; died 1587
1587	1607	See vacant	
1607	unknown	Daniel Drihin	Appointed vicar apostolic by papal brief 17 November 1607
1624	1636	John Roche (bishop)	Appointed 29 April 1624; died 9 April 1636
1636	1645	See vacant	
1645	1678	Nicholas French	Appointed 6 February and consecrated 23 November 1645; also appointed auxiliary bishop of Santiago de Compostela 1652–1666, Paris 1666–1668, and Ghent 1668–1678; died 23 August 1678
1678	1683/84	See vacant	
1683/84	1687	Luke Wadding	Appointed coadjutor bishop of Ferns on 12 May 1671, but did not accept the post until late 1672; consecrated bishop of Ferns, probably in June 1683; died 1687
1687	1697	See vacant	
1697	1709	Michael Rossiter	Appointed 1 July 1697; possibly died 1709
1709	1728	John Verdon	Appointed 14 September 1709; died circa 1728
1729	1744	Ambrose Ó Ceallacháin, O.F.M.	Appointed 26 September 1729; died 8 August 1744
1745	1786	𝗡𝗶𝗰𝗵𝗼𝗹𝗮𝘀 𝗦𝘄𝗲𝗲𝘁𝗺𝗮𝗻	Appointed 25 January 1745; died 19 October 1786
1786	1814	James Caulfield	Appointed coadjutor bishop 26 February and consecrated 7 July 1782; succeeded 19 October 1786; died 14 January 1814
1814	1819	Patrick Ryan	Appointed coadjutor bishop 2 October 1804 and consecrated 2 February 1805; succeeded 14 January 1814; died 9 March 1819
1819	1849	James Keatinge	Appointed coadjutor bishop 6 December 1818; succeeded 9 March and consecrated 21 March 1819; died 7 September 1849
1849	1856	Myles Murphy	Appointed 19 November 1849 and consecrated 10 March 1850; died 13 August 1856
1857	1875	Thomas Furlong	Appointed 9 January and consecrated 22 March 1857; died 12 November 1875
1876	1884	Michael Warren	Appointed 13 or 14 March and consecrated 7 May 1876; resigned 22 April 1884; died 22 April 1885
1884	1917	James Browne	Appointed 6 or 8 July and consecrated 14 September 1884; died 21 June 1917
1917	1938	William Codd	Appointed 7 December 1917 and consecrated 25 February 1918; died 12 March 1938
1938	1963	James Staunton	Appointed 10 December 1938 and consecrated 5 February 1939; died 26 or 27 June 1963
1964	1983	Donal Herlihy	Appointed 30 October and consecrated 15 November 1964; died 2 April 1983
1984	2002	Brendan Oliver Comiskey, SS.CC.	Formerly auxiliary bishop of Dublin 1979–1984; appointed bishop of Ferns 4 or 11 April 1984; resigned 6 April 2002
2006	2021	Denis Brennan	Appointed 1 March and consecrated 23 April 2006; retired 11 June 2021.
2021	present	Gerard Nash	Appointed 11 June and consecrated 5 September 2021.

== Notes ==
- ^{A} ^{B} Alexander Devereux was bishop of both successions.
