= Ferns Cathedral =

- The Cathedral Church of St. Edan, Ferns
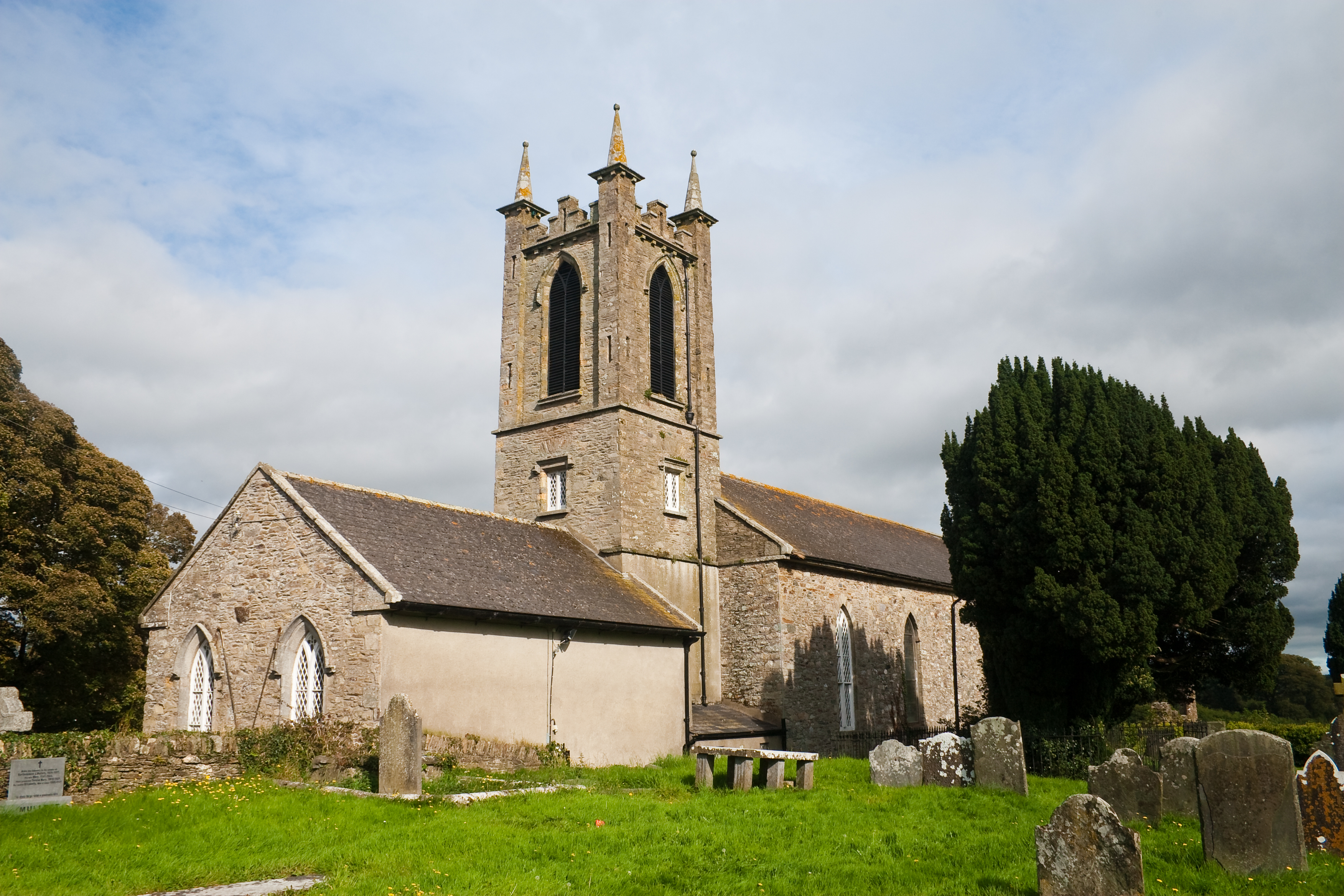
- Ferns Cathedral
- 52°35′24″N 6°29′34″W
- Location: Ferns, County Wexford
- Country: Ireland
- Denomination: Church of Ireland
- Website: https://cashel.anglican.org/ferns-cathedral/

History
- Dedication: St. Edan (Ædan) (Máedóc of Ferns)

Administration
- Province: Province of Dublin
- Diocese: Diocese of Cashel and Ossory

Clergy
- Bishop: The Right Reverend Adrian Wilkinson
- Dean: The Very Rev'd. Dr Paul Mooney Kilrane and Taghmon: The Rev'd Canon Trevor Sargent Clone and Crosspatrick: The Rev'd Canon Patrick A Harvey

The Cathedral Church of St Edan is a cathedral of the Church of Ireland in Ferns, County Wexford in Ireland. It is in the ecclesiastical province of Dublin. Until 1949, the designation of the cathedral was the Cathedral Church of St. Ædan, a variant spelling of Edan or Aidan.

Previously the cathedral of the Diocese of Ferns, it is now one of six cathedrals in the Diocese of Cashel and Ossory.

== History ==
The original medieval Roman Catholic cathedral was built by Bishop St. John in the 1230s. A Catholic cathedral, also dedicated to Saint Aidan, was erected in Enniscorthy in the nineteenth century to a design by Pugin.

The building was burnt down in Elizabethan times by the O'Byrnes of Wicklow, and only a small portion of the ruins remain. Although Queen Elizabeth I of England ordered it rebuilt, only a section of the choir was restored. This was subsequently further altered in the early 1800s. The cathedral was reordered again in the early 1900s through the efforts of Thomas Brownell Gibson, Dean from 1908 until 1926. An internal chancel arch was raised, and a quire and sanctuary created. Chapter stalls were re-used from Kilkenny cathedral (the classical stalls which they replaced are now in the extensive chapter house to the west of Ferns cathedral ). A new episcopal 'cathedra' was provided and the flat plaster ceiling of the church was replaced with one of boarded wood in a gothic revival style.

Of the surviving medieval fabric, the blind arcading of the chancel is of particular note as are the north and south lancets and viscae of the East Wall. The central lancets are a conjectural restoration. There is a very fine medieval episcopal effigy by the font and the remains of some pillars of the quire arcade are to be seen in the walls to the west of the new chancel arch. The eighteenth or early nineteenth century west tower may well be on the site of a crossing of the mediaeval cathedral. An earlier belief that the present cathedral was part of the nave of the older building was based on the existence of remains of a separate medieval church, on the same axis, some way to the east. The chancel arcade and Eastern lancets challenge this conjecture as does the marked difference in floor level which, in the Eastern fragment, is some metres lower.

Richard de Clare, 2nd Earl of Pembroke (of the first creation), Lord of Leinster, Justiciar of Ireland (1130 – 20 April 1176), also commonly known as "Strongbow", was buried on the side of the church as confirmed by the Rector of the Church in 2009. Giraldus Cambrensis, who was a contemporary eyewitness, specifically notes that the tomb in at Christ Church Cathedral, Dublin is only a replica.

== Burials ==
- Diarmait Mac Murchada
- Domhnall Caomhánach
- Richard of Northampton
- Richard de Clare, 2nd Earl of Pembroke
- Father John Murphy (partial remains buried in churchyard)

== Vandalism ==
The cathedral was vandalised in early 2009 by youths. Many panes of glass were broken in the cathedral and the pane of glass protecting the east window was cracked. Headstones in the adjacent St Peter's Cemetery were also knocked over.

== Gallery ==
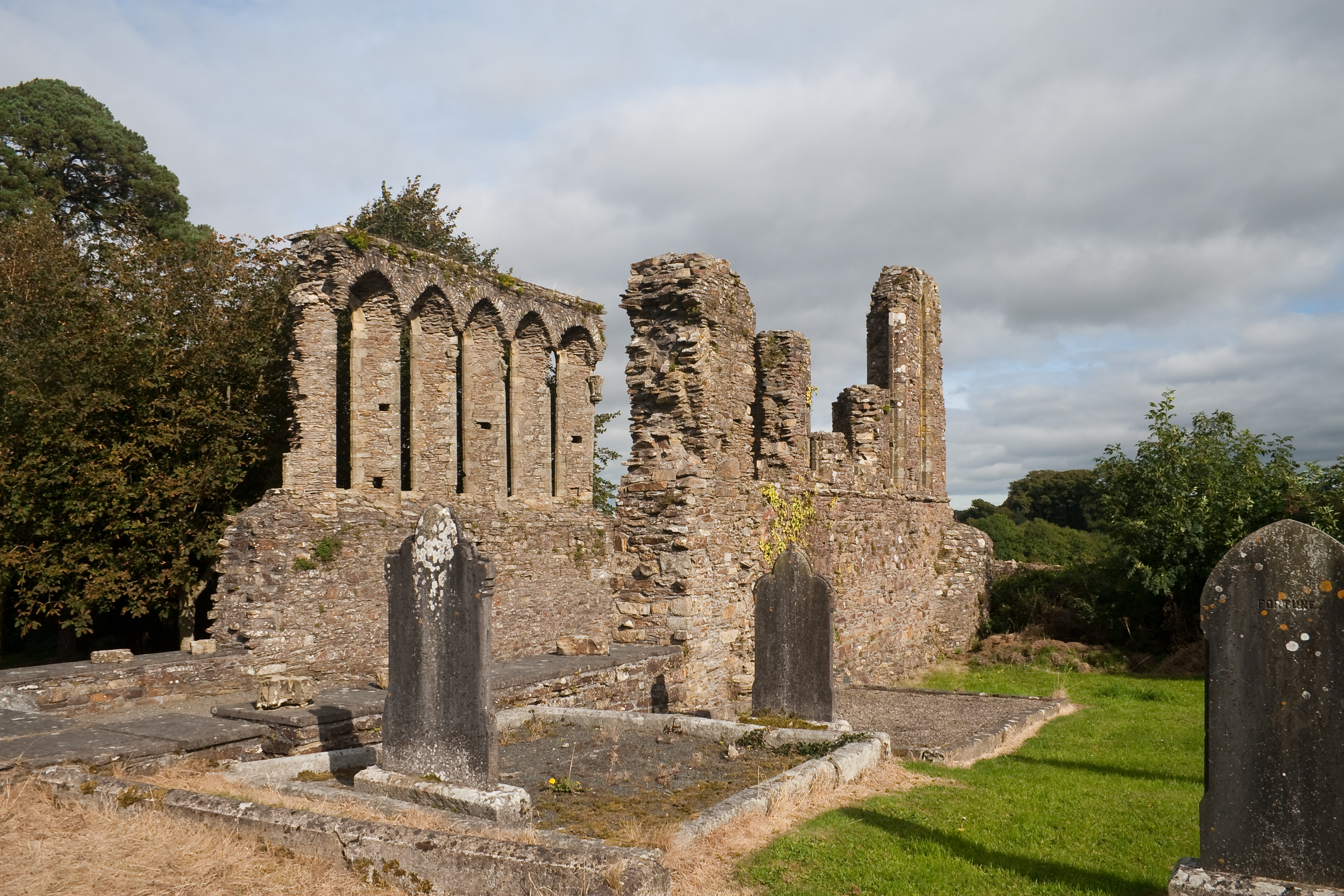
Ruin of the medieval chancel

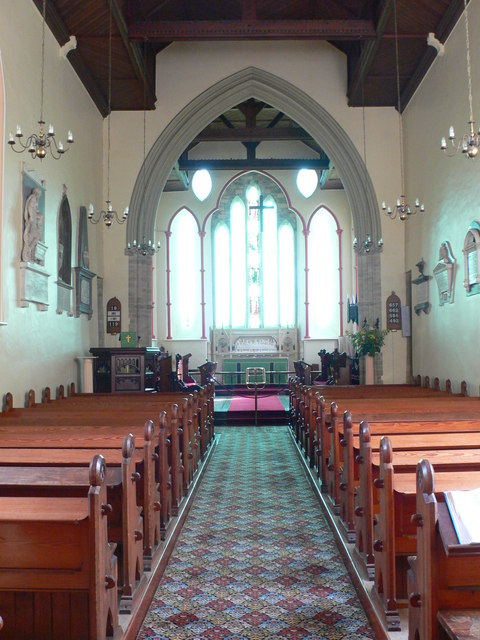
The cathedral's nave

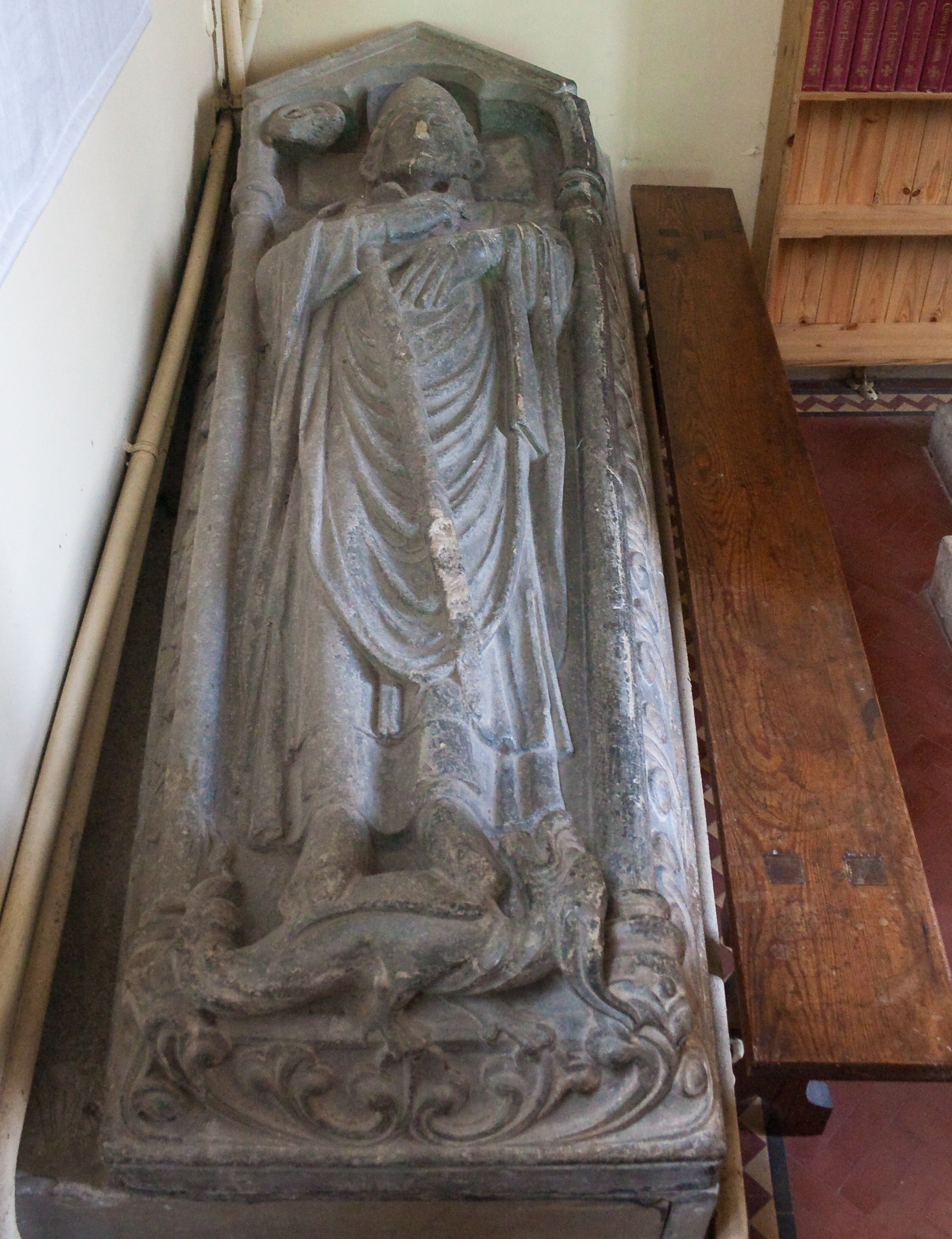
Tomb of John of St John, mid 13th-century

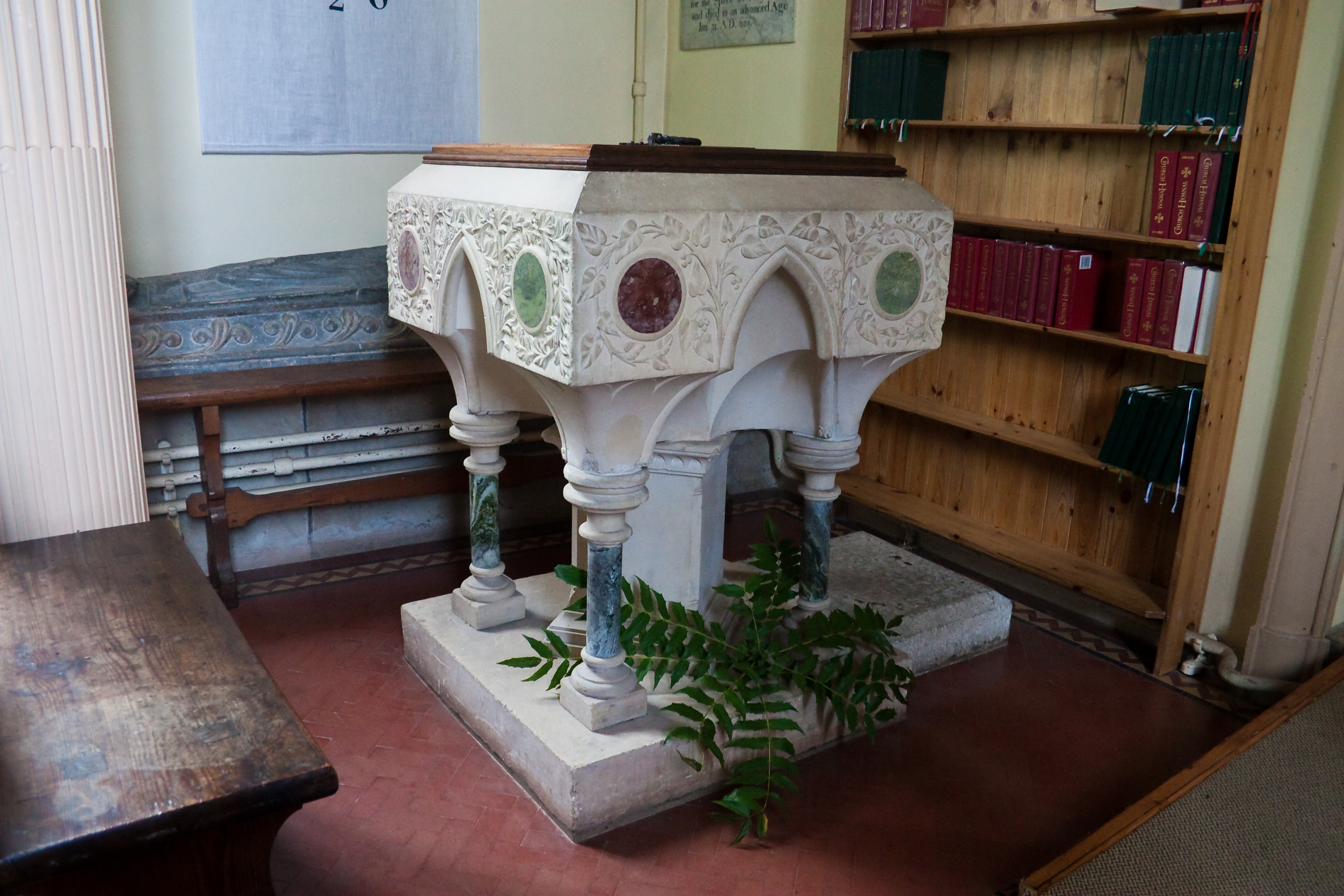
Baptismal font

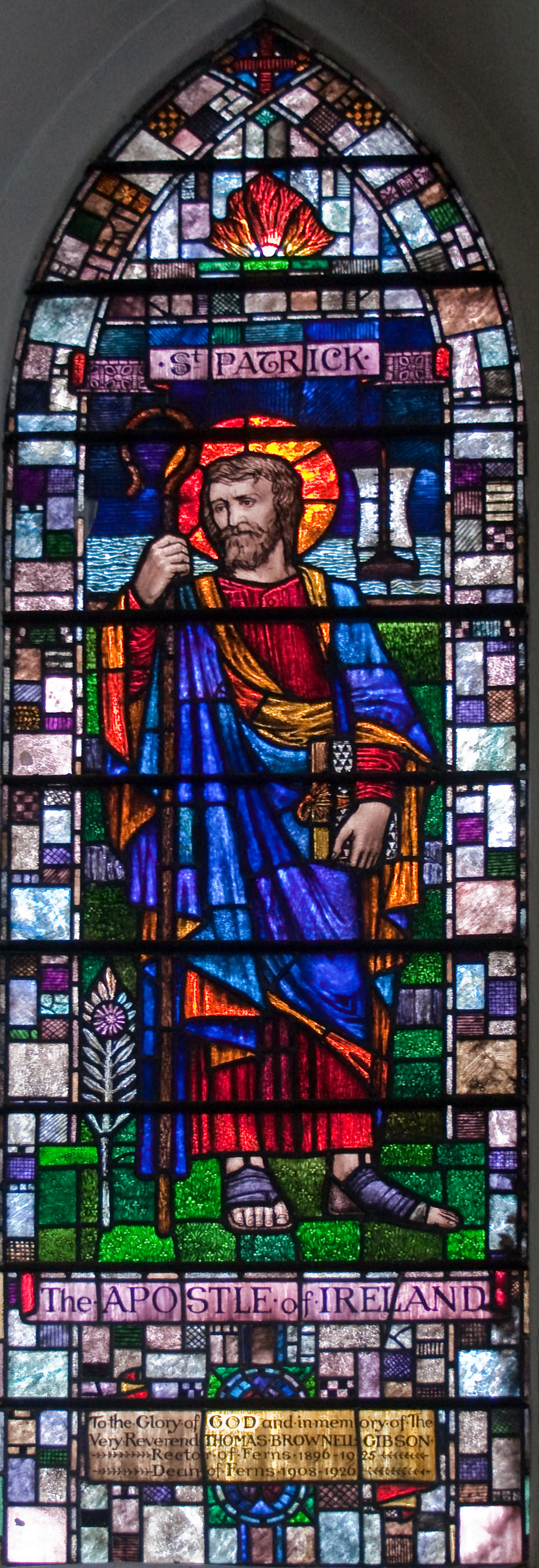
The St. Patrick window by Catherine O'Brien

== See also ==
- List of cathedrals in Ireland
- Bishop of Ferns
- Dean of Ferns
