= Catholic Church sexual abuse cases in Ireland =

In Ireland, beginning in the 1990s, a series of criminal cases and Irish government enquiries established that hundreds of priests had abused thousands of children over decades. Six reports by the former National Board for Safeguarding Children in the Catholic Church established that six Irish priests had been convicted between 1995 and 2011. This has contributed to the secularisation of Ireland and to the decline in influence of the Catholic Church. Ireland held referendums to legalise same-sex marriage in 2015 and abortion in 2020.

Like the Catholic Church sex abuse cases in the United States and elsewhere, the abuse in Ireland included cases of high-profile, supposedly celibate Catholic clerics involved in illicit heterosexual relations as well as widespread physical abuse of children in the Catholic-run childcare network. In many cases, the abusing priests were moved to other parishes to avoid embarrassment or a scandal, assisted by senior clergy. By 2010 a number of in-depth judicial reports had been published, but with only a limited number of criminal convictions.

In March 2010, Pope Benedict XVI wrote a pastoral letter of apology for all of the abuse that had been carried out by Catholic clergy in Ireland. On 31 May 2010, Benedict established a formal panel to investigate the sex abuse scandal, saying that it could serve as a healing mechanism for the country and its Catholics. Among the nine members of the apostolic visitation were Cardinal Seán Patrick O'Malley, the Archbishop of Boston (he investigated the Archdiocese of Dublin); Cardinal Timothy Michael Dolan, the two nuns, Sister Sharon Holland (IHM) and Sister Mairin McDonagh (RJM),(who investigated women's religious institutes and the formation there), Cardinal Cormac Murphy-O'Connor, the Archbishop Emeritus of Westminster.

In August 2018, a list was published revealing that over 1,300 Catholic clergy members in Ireland were accused of sexual abuse and 82 of them were convicted.

== Early revelations of sexual misconduct ==
The accepted norm in the Irish Church was that its priesthood was celibate and chaste. Homosexuality was and in some places of Ireland still is, viewed as both a sin and a crime. The Church forbade its members (the "faithful") to use artificial contraception, campaigned strongly against laws allowing abortion and divorce, and publicly disapproved of unmarried cohabiting couples and illegitimacy.

A series of television documentaries in the 1990s and 2010s, such as "Suffer the children" (UTV, 2004), Suing the Pope or The Magdalene Sisters, led on to the need for a series of government-sponsored reports and new guidelines within the Church and society to better protect children. In 1995–2002, the emergence of the same problem led to the view that the Church had attempted to cover up abuse and misconduct, which was not limited to sexual abuse (see Catholic sex abuse cases in the United States). By the late 2000s the misconduct was recognized as a worldwide scandal.

=== Brendan Smyth ===
One of the most widely known cases of sexual abuse in Ireland involved Brendan Smyth, who, between 1945 and 1989, sexually abused and assaulted 20 children in parishes in Belfast, Dublin, and the United States. The investigation of the Smyth case was allegedly obstructed by the Norbertine Order. He was arrested in 1995; however, Ireland's Attorney General did not immediately comply with a request from the Royal Ulster Constabulary for Smyth's extradition. The ensuing controversy over the delay led to the collapse of the Fianna Fáil/Labour coalition government. As of early May 2012 Cardinal Seán Brady was under pressure to resign because as a part of a church investigation into Smyth he only reported the information he gleaned to church authorities and not to the police. The church's subsequent failure to deal with Smyth gave him the opportunity to abuse more children. Brady only resigned when required to do so by canon law upon turning 75 in September 2014.

== Abuse in the state childcare system ==
In the 1990s, a series of television programs publicized allegations of systemic abuse in Ireland's Roman Catholic-run childcare system, primarily in the Reformatory and Industrial Schools. The abuse occurred primarily between the 1930s and 1970s. These documentaries included "Dear Daughter," "Washing Away the Stain," and "Witness: Sex in a Cold Climate and Sinners". These programs interviewed adult victims of abuse who provided testimony of their experiences, which documented Church and State collusion in the operation of these institutions, and they underscored the climate of secrecy and denial that permeated the church response when faced with controversial accusations. The topic was also covered by American broadcast media. Programs such as CBS's 60 Minutes and ABC's 20/20 produced segments on the subject for an Irish-American audience.

In 1999, a documentary film series titled States of Fear detailed abuse suffered by Irish children between the 1930s and 1970s in the state childcare system, primarily in the Reformatory and Industrial Schools.

== Response of the Irish government to the scandal ==
In response to the furor aroused by media reports, the Irish government commissioned a study that took nine years to complete. On 20 May 2009, the commission released its 2600-page report, which drew on testimony from thousands of former inmates and officials from more than 250 church-run institutions. The commission found that Catholic priests and nuns had terrorized thousands of boys and girls for decades and that government inspectors had failed to stop the chronic beatings, rapes, and humiliation. The report characterized rape and molestation as "endemic" in Irish Catholic church-run Industrial Schools and orphanages.

== Response of the Church to the scandals ==
In February 2002, 18 religious institutes agreed to provide more than €128 million in compensation to the victims of child abuse.

In 2005 the Church published an Instruction Concerning the Criteria for the Discernment of Vocations with regard to Persons with Homosexual Tendencies in view of their Admission to the Seminary and to Holy Orders.

In 2006 the Church set up the National Board for Safeguarding Children in the Catholic Church in Ireland (NBSC) to suggest ways to safeguard children and improve policy, and to monitor practices and observance of policy. In 2008 the Health Service Executive had required a child safety audit which the Bishops felt unable to co-operate with for legal reasons, and in 2009 they asked the NBSC to perform this role. In its report of 2010–March 2011 the NBSC complained that it had also been denied the same information, also for legal reasons, and that Church funding for its training programmes in child protection had ended in 2009. The 2010–11 report listed 272 new allegations of abuse, mainly "of a historical nature," up from 197 allegations in its 2009–10 report.

== Brendan Comiskey ==
In March 2002, a BBC documentary, titled Suing the Pope, highlighted the case of Seán Fortune, one of the most notorious clerical sex offenders. The film followed Colm O'Gorman as he investigated the story of how Fortune was allowed to abuse him and countless other teenage boys. The Church's practice of parish transfers of abusive priests allowed Fortune to be transferred to other parishes without notifying them about any former abuse allegations.

On 1 April 2002, Brendan Comiskey, Bishop of Ferns, resigned over charges that he had failed to deal adequately with allegations that Fortune and others were sexually abusing children.

== Desmond Connell ==
In October 2002, Ireland's national broadcasting station, Raidió Teilifís Éireann, or RTE, aired a television documentary titled Primetime: Cardinal Secrets which charged Dublin's Cardinal Desmond Connell with mishandling the sex abuse scandal and accused him of participating in a deliberate cover-up of facts. Connell retired as archbishop on 26 April 2004.

The Murphy Report found that Connell had handled the affair "badly" as he was "slow to recognize the seriousness of the situation". It did praise him for making the archdiocesan records available to the authorities in 2002 and for his 1995 actions in giving the authorities the names of 17 priests who had been accused of abuse, although it said the list was incomplete as complaints were made against at least 28 priests in the Archdiocese. He was criticized for being "economical with the truth" in his use of the concept of mental reservation to inadequately answer questions truthfully about his knowledge of the abusive activities of priests under his control.

== Ferns Report ==
The Ferns Inquiry (2005) was an official Irish government inquiry into the allegations of clerical sexual abuse in the Irish Roman Catholic Diocese of Ferns. The investigation was established in the wake of the broadcast of the BBC Television documentary "Suing the Pope". O'Gorman, through One in Four, the organisation he founded to support women and men who have experienced sexual violence, successfully campaigned for the Ferns Inquiry.

The Ferns Inquiry recorded its revulsion at the extent, severity and duration of the child sexual abuse allegedly perpetrated on children by priests acting under the aegis of the Diocese of Ferns.

== Irish Child Abuse Commission 2009 ==
A lengthy report detailing cases of emotional, physical and sexual abuse of thousands of children over 70 years was published on 20 May 2009. The report drew on the testimony of nearly 2,000 witnesses, men and women who attended more than 200 Catholic-run schools from the 1930s until the 1990s.

As per 2002 agreement between the victims on one side and the Roman Catholic brothers and Irish government on other side, all those who accepted the state/Brothers settlements had to waive their right to sue both the church and the government. Their abusers' identities are also kept secret.

=== Response of government ===
Ireland's national police force announced that they would study the report to see if it provided any new evidence for prosecuting clerics for assault, rape or other criminal offences. The report, however, did not identify any abusers by name because of a right-to-privacy lawsuit by the Christian Brothers.

Shamed by the extent, length, and cruelty of child abuse, Ireland's former Prime Minister Brian Cowen apologized to victims for the government's failure to intervene in endemic sexual abuse and severe beatings in schools for much of the 20th century. He also promised to reform the Ireland's social services for children in line with the recommendations of the Commission to Inquire into Child Abuse report. Further motions to start criminal investigation against members of Roman Catholic religious institutes in Ireland were made by Irish President Mary McAleese and Prime Minister Cowen

=== Response of the bishops ===
The highest-ranked official of the Roman Catholic Church in Ireland, Dublin Archbishop Diarmuid Martin slammed Irish Catholic orders for concealing their culpability in decades of child abuse, and said they needed to come up with much more money to compensate victims.

At the conclusion of its 2009 summer meeting, the Irish Catholic Bishops' Conference said that the abuse of children in institutions run by Catholic priests and nuns was part of a culture that was prevalent in the Catholic Church in Ireland. The bishops spent a major portion of their 8–10 June meeting discussing a report from the Commission to Inquire into Child Abuse, published 20 May under chairman Sean Ryan. The commission found that church institutions failed to prevent an extensive level of sexual, physical and emotional abuse and neglect.

In a joint statement, the bishops said that, "the Ryan report represents the most recent disturbing indictment of a culture that was prevalent in the Catholic Church in Ireland for far too long. Heinous crimes were perpetrated against the most innocent and vulnerable, and vile acts with life-lasting effects were carried out under the guise of the mission of Jesus Christ. This abuse represents a serious betrayal of the trust which was placed in the church."

Cardinal Seán Brady expressed remorse on behalf of the church and the religious saying "we are ashamed, humbled and repentant that our people strayed so far from their Christian ideals, for this we ask forgiveness." The abuses were the result of "a culture that was prevalent in the Catholic Church in Ireland for far too long", said Brady.

The bishops offered four immediate responses to address the issues raised in the report:

- Sadness over the "suffering of so many for so long."
- An invitation to survivors to "engage with us" in an effort to understand how to assist the victims of abuse.
- The intention to respond as pastors "despite the inadequacies at times of our previous pastoral responses."
- Praying for the "well being and peace of mind for all who suffered" and urging all Catholics to join them in prayer.

=== Response by religious institutes ===
In 2011, abbot of Glenstal Abbey and Benedictine monk Dom Mark Patrick Hederman, OSB, was quoted by novelist and writer Russell Shorto speaking about the Church making "this island [Ireland] into a concentration camp where [the Church] could control everything. ... And the control was really all about sex. ... It's not difficult to understand how the whole system became riddled with what we now call a scandal but in fact was a complete culture."

== Tony Walsh ==
In December 2010, Archdiocese of Dublin "singing priest" Tony Walsh was sentenced to 123 years in prison for 14 child abuse convictions involving sex-related offences dating from the mid-1970s to the mid-1980s. However, the sentences were to be served concurrently, netting to a maximum of 16 years. By the time he pleaded guilty in December 2018 to indecently assaulting a teenage boy with a crucifix on a date in 1983, Walsh had already been in prison for 13 years.

== Summary of diocesan sexual abuse inquiries ==
=== Archdiocese of Armagh ===
- Fr. Andrew Allen pleaded guilty in 1993 to molesting two boys in Trinidad and Tobago between 1981 and 1985 and was given a two-year suspended prison sentence and a £150,000 fine. The same year, he was also convicted of molesting an altar boy in Drogheda between 1991 and 1992 and was given a one-year prison sentence.
- Br. Francis Patrick Mallon was sentenced in May 1994 to three months in prison for abusing three girls on the grounds of the Servite Priory at Benburb, Co Tyrone.
- Fr. Michael Gerard McQuillan was convicted in 2004 of 40 counts of sexual abuse involving five children, four boys and a girl who was the sister of one of the boys. McQuillan met the children when he was the chaplain at a school in County Armagh. He was sentenced to 12 years in prison.

==== Diocese of Connor and Down ====
- Fr. Daniel Curran received a seven-year jail sentence in 1995 after admitting sex offences on nine young boys; given an 18-month suspended sentence in 2005 for indecently assaulting a 10th boy in the 1980s; in 2006 he received a 14-month sentence after pleading guilty to five counts of indecent assault on a boy between 1977 and 1982.
- Fr. Joseph M. Steele pleaded guilty in 1996 to multiple charges involving the indecent assaults of three girls and two boys between 1969 and 1983 and served two and a half years in prison. He pleaded guilty to five counts of indecent assault and two of gross indecency against a boy and three counts of indecently assaulting a female victim between 1967 and 1983. He died in 2012 while awaiting his sentence for these other convictions

=== Archdiocese of Dublin ===
Fr. Paul McGennis abused Marie Collins when she was in Our Lady's Hospital for Sick Children in 1961, when she was 13. In November 2009, an independent report commissioned by the Irish government investigated the way in which the church dealt with allegations of sexual abuse of children by priests over the period 1975 to 2004. It concluded that "the Dublin Archdiocese's pre-occupations in dealing with cases of child sexual abuse, at least until the mid-1990s, were the maintenance of secrecy, the avoidance of scandal, the protection of the reputation of the Church, and the preservation of its assets. All other considerations, including the welfare of children and justice for victims, were subordinated to these priorities. The Archdiocese did not implement its own canon law rules and did its best to avoid any application of the law of the State."

=== Archdiocese of Tuam ===
Fr. Joseph Summerville pleaded guilty in 1996 to four of the 15 charges against him. He admitted indecently assaulting an adolescent boy during the years 1988 and 1989, while he was a boarding school chaplain at St. Jarlath's College, Tuam and was given a four-year prison sentence. A judge later imposed an additional one-year sentence after learning the details of his grooming another victim, a 15-year-old boy, in a parochial house.

==== Galway, Kilmacduagh and Kilfenora diocese ====
An eight-year (1999–2007) enquiry and report by Dr. Elizabeth Healy and Dr. Kevin McCoy into the Brothers of Charity Congregation's "Holy Family School" in Galway, the major city of the archdiocese, and two other locations was made public in December 2007. Eleven brothers and seven other staff members were alleged to have abused 121 intellectually disabled children in residential care in the period 1965–1998.

A review that was published on 30 November 2011, into the handling of clerical child sex abuse allegations in the Diocese of Tuam has praised Archbishop Neary for his actions. The report said serious harm was done to children by a few priests of the archdiocese but Dr Neary met allegations "with a steadily serious approach, taking appropriate action under existing guidelines, and rapidly assimilating the lesson of the necessity for the removal of the priest, where there is a credible allegation, pending investigation." The report said it is clear from the "excellent records" that a genuine effort was made to gather evidence from victims and their families during the Church inquiry stage and such "thoroughness is to be commended". The report added that "It is also a fair reflection to say that the archbishop has met resistance in asking a priest to step aside from public ministry. It is to his credit that in spite of opposition, Archbishop Neary has maintained his authority and kept some men out of ministry where there is evidence to suggest that they should be viewed as dangerous and should not have access to young people." Neary said "This is an enormous tribute to all working in this area. It is very encouraging to see that their work has been recognised, affirmed and appreciated in the report."

=== Diocese of Cloyne ===
In 2008, bishop John Magee found himself at the centre of a controversy surrounding his mishandling of child sex abuse cases in the diocese of Cloyne. On 7 March 2009 Pope Benedict XVI appointed Archbishop Dermot Clifford of Cashel and Emly as apostolic administrator of the Cloyne diocese, though Magee remains Bishop in title. Magee requested that the Pope take this action on 4 February. Magee said that he would use the time to "devote the necessary time and energy to cooperating fully with the government Commission of Inquiry into child protection practices and procedures in the diocese of Cloyne".

On 24 March 2010 it was announced by the Holy See that Bishop Magee had formally resigned from his duties as Bishop of Cloyne and was now bishop emeritus. A report by a judicial inquiry into diocesan reporting and oversight of alleged abusers was published in July 2011.

=== Diocese of Raphoe ===
Prior to being appointed Bishop of Derry, where he served between 1994 and 2011, Séamus Hegarty was Bishop of the Diocese of Raphoe in 1982–1994, at a time when one of his priests, Father Eugene Greene, raped 26 young men. Hegarty's replacement Bishop Boyce, and the Irish hierarchy, criticised a 2011 media article that claimed that "There were hundreds and hundreds of victims, and they were abused again and again while the church actively prevented investigations by the civil authorities". Greene was later arrested in 1999 and sentenced the next year to 12 years in prison after pleading guilty to 40 of the 115 charges he was facing. He was released from prison in 2008 after serving 9 years of his sentence.

Between January and November 2011, four Diocese of Raphoe priests who were accused of committing sex abuse were convicted.

=== Diocese of Ossory ===
Since 1975, a total of 27 allegations of abuse have been made against 14 priests in the Diocese of Ossory. All of these allegations were eventually reported to the Gardaí and the HSE. The Diocese of Ossory has paid €370,000 in compensation to the victims of child sexual abuse.

In 1994, a sexually abusive priest was brought to the attention of then Bishop of Ossory Laurence Forristal. Upon receiving legal advice, the bishop did not notify Gardaí of the abuse allegation. Instead, 11 years later in 2005 the information was passed onto authorities. The priest, upon conviction, was immediately removed from ministry.

In 1996, a still unnamed priest in Kilkenny was convicted for the abuse of two children, the "largest-ever investigation into child abuse at the time".

== Abuse by religious orders ==
As well as the diocesan clergy, a number of Irish members of Roman Catholic religious institutes have been named in criminal prosecutions for abuse; some were tried outside Ireland. These cases amplify, but were not covered by, the Commission to Inquire into Child Abuse findings (see above).

== Catholic Boy Scouts of Ireland ==
In May 2020, it was revealed that prior to the 2004 merger with the Scout Association of Ireland (SAI) which formed Scouting Ireland, the Catholic Boy Scouts of Ireland (CBSI) covered up sex abuse committed by people who served in the organization. In a period spanning decades, both the CBSI and SAI shielded 275 known or suspected predators who abused children after becoming aware of the reported acts of abuse. Scouting Ireland backed the findings of the report and issued an apology.

== Other cases ==
As well the reports, many other victims of clerical abuse came forward with their own stories; including actor Gabriel Byrne and Derry Morgan. In each case the victim was told to keep quiet, and the priest involved was usually admired by the victim's family; this made it difficult for victims to speak out, adding long-term psychological injury to the abuse itself.

In 2010 Fr. Patrick Hughes was convicted on four counts of indecent assault. Detective Sergeant Joseph McLoughlin said that the Garda Síochána were "getting the run-around from church authorities".

Investigations continue where Irish abusers were sent abroad by the church to other countries, where they abused other children.

== Alleged abuses by Irish missionary priests ==
On 23 May 2011 RTÉ broadcast A Mission to Prey, concerning alleged abuses by missionary priests against young people in Africa. It has since emerged that one of the allegations against Fr. Kevin Reynolds, fathering a child, was baseless, and this has caused a political scandal in Ireland since the national television network aired the allegations without arranging a DNA test.

At the time of the May broadcast, the Irish Missionary Union, representing 83 missionary groups, issued a statement deploring "any crimes of abuse or inappropriate behaviour at home or abroad, which led to children or vulnerable adults being abused", but did not say when it would investigate any of the allegations. Instead it called on the Gardaí to investigate, a process that could be slow and expensive. The Irish Missionary Union, along with the Conference of Religious of Ireland and the Irish bishops, followed legal advice to refuse information to the National Board for Safeguarding Children (see above), even though it is one of the Board's sponsoring bodies.

Alan Shatter, the Minister for Justice and Equality, commented about the RTÉ programme that he had "a sense of revulsion at the unspeakable catalogue of abuse against children. While the behaviour took place abroad, we have a solemn duty to do all that is within our power to ensure that perpetrators of this predatory abuse of children are brought to justice wherever it takes place." Irish criminal law allows for the prosecution in Ireland of sex offences committed abroad under the Sexual Offences (Jurisdiction) Act 1996.

The program wrongly made allegations against Fr. Kevin Reynolds, who received an apology and "massive damages".

Richard Anthony Burke was accused in the same program of underage sex in Nigeria. He sued RTÉ for libel in 2015, claiming he and the accuser had only had adult consensual sex. RTÉ settled out of court, claiming to have paid part of Burke's costs but no damages.

== Pastoral letter from Pope Benedict XVI ==
After the pressure gathered from the Ryan and Murphy Reports and the resignation of bishops, Pope Benedict XVI summoned all of the Irish Bishops to the Vatican in January 2010. Following their meeting, it was announced that a pastoral letter would be written to address the issues involving the sexual abuse of children.

The letter was released by the Vatican on 20 March 2010. In the letter addressed to the Catholics of Ireland, the Pope said he was "truly sorry" for the harm done to Catholics who suffered "sinful and criminal" abuse at the hands of priests, brothers and nuns. He acknowledged the "serious mistakes" made by the clergy. The letter did not ask for the resignation of the Cardinal Primate of All Ireland, Seán Brady, and did not address the Ryan and Murphy reports. The letter was to be read out at Mass on 21 March 2010.

Reaction to the contents of the letter was mixed. The letter was well received by Cardinal Brady, Archbishop of Dublin Diarmuid Martin and the Conference of Religious of Ireland (CORI). Survivors of Child Abuse coordinator John Kelly said in a statement, "This letter is a possible step to closure and we owe it to ourselves to study it and to give it a measured response. We are heartened by the Pontiff's open acceptance that the abusive behavior of priests and religious were criminal acts." Others did not think the letter went "far enough". One victim of abuse, Andrew Madden, called upon the Pope to resign. One in Four, a group representing victims of sexual abuse, said that they were "deeply disappointed" with the letter.

== False allegations ==
Not all allegations made against priests have turned out to be true. Fr. Liam O'Brien, parish priest at Currow, in Killarney, County Kerry, was subjected to claims of sexual abuse for more than four years starting in December 2008. In May 2013, his accuser, Eileen Culloty, a woman in his parish who had stalked and harassed the priest, even disrupting a funeral service he was conducting in 2011, apologised unreservedly in a letter read to the High Court. The woman admitted fabricating the allegations and said O'Brien was a person of the utmost integrity.

The spectacular conviction of Nora Wall a former Irish sister of the Sisters of Mercy was found to be based on evidence from unreliable witnesses who admitted to lying.

== List of accused clergy ==
In August 2018, a list was released revealing that of the over 1,300 Irish clergy who were accused, only 82 were convicted.

== See also ==
Sexual abuse cases in the Catholic church

- Catholic Church sexual abuse cases
- Catholic Church sexual abuse cases by country
- Sexual abuse cases in the Catholic archdiocese of Dublin
- William Kamm, leader of schismatic Catholic group convicted for sexual abuse

Critique and consequences related topics

- Criticism of Pope John Paul II
- Debate on the causes of clerical child abuse
- Ecclesiastical response to Catholic sexual abuse cases
- Instruction Concerning the Criteria for the Discernment of Vocations with Regard to Persons with Homosexual Tendencies in View of Their Admission to the Seminary and to Holy Orders
- Media coverage of Catholic sex abuse cases
- Settlements and bankruptcies in Catholic sex abuse cases
- Sex Crimes and the Vatican, BBC documentary

Investigation, prevention and victim support related topics

- Pontifical Commission for the Protection of Minors
- Sexual Addiction & Compulsivity, peer-reviewed journal on prevention & treatment
- Vos estis lux mundi, church procedure for abuse cases

Other related topics

- Child sexual abuse
- Clerical celibacy
- Homosexual clergy in the Catholic Church
- Pontifical secret
- Religious abuse
