= Denis Brennan =

Irish former Roman Catholic prelate (born 1945)

The Most Reverend, Dr. Denis Brennan DD
- Bishop Emeritus of Ferns
- Church: Roman Catholic
- Diocese: Ferns
- Appointed: 1 March 2006
- Installed: 23 April 2006
- Term ended: 11 June 2021
- Predecessor: Brendan Comiskey
- Successor: Gerard Nash
- Previous posts: Delegate for child protection at the Diocese of Ferns; Vicar forane for the Wexford deanery Parish priest of Taghmon; Administrator of St Senan's parish, Enniscorthy; Superior general of the House of Missions, Enniscorthy

Orders
- Ordination: 31 May 1970
- Consecration: 23 April 2006 by Diarmuid Martin

Personal details
- Born: 20 June 1945 (age 80) Rathnure, County Wexford, Ireland
- Parents: Denis and Bridget Brennan
- Motto: Rejoice and be glad
- Coat of arms

Styles of Denis Brennan
- Reference style: The Most Reverend
- Spoken style: Your Grace
- Religious style: Bishop

Denis Brennan (born 20 June 1945) is an Irish former Roman Catholic prelate who served as Bishop of Ferns between 2006 and 2021.

== Early life and education ==
Brennan was born in Springmount, Rathnure, County Wexford on 20 June 1945, the only child of Denis and Bridget Brennan. He attended primary school at Kiltealy National School and secondary school at St Peter's College, Wexford, before studying for the priesthood at St Peter's College.

He was ordained to the priesthood for the Diocese of Ferns on 31 May 1970.

== Presbyteral ministry ==
Following ordination, Brennan became a member of the Missionaries of the Blessed Sacrament at the House of Missions, Enniscorthy in September 1970, conducting missions and retreats in Ireland, Great Britain and Canada.

He was appointed administrator of St Senan's parish, Enniscorthy, in December 1986, during which time he also served as the last superior general of the House of Missions before its closure in 1992.

Brennan was subsequently appointed parish priest of Taghmon in March 1997, and subsequently as diocesan delegate for child protection in December 2000. He also served as vicar forane for the Wexford deanery and a member of the diocesan council of priests.

Brennan had also completed a Doctorate in Divinity and been 11 June appointed a Chaplain of His Holiness.

== Episcopal ministry ==
Brennan was appointed Bishop-elect of Ferns by Pope Benedict XVI on 1 March 2006. He was consecrated by the Archbishop of Dublin, Diarmuid Martin, on 23 April in St Aidan's Cathedral, Enniscorthy. In his first address as bishop, he praised the work of the outgoing apostolic administrator, Éamonn Walsh, in bringing justice and healing to victims of clerical sexual abuse in the diocese, saying that the greatest compliment which could be paid to him was "to continue steadfastly in his work of healing and reconciliation".

=== Clerical sexual abuse scandals ===
Brennan is regarded by many as having brought stability to the diocese after the publication of the Ferns Report, in which 100 cases of clerical sexual abuse which occurred during the episcopacies of his predecessors, Brendan Comiskey and Donal Herlihy, were disclosed.

In a meeting held on 1 March 2010, he told parishioners that the diocese had had to pay more than €8 million to settle 48 civil actions, while a further thirteen actions were pending.

Brennan also said that a request for financial help from parishioners was not about sharing blame, but about "asking for help to fulfil a God-given responsibility", adding that victims of clerical sexual abuse were not the cause of the diocese's problems, but rather "the actions of individual perpetrators, along with mismanagement, poor understanding and/or lack of resolve":

"The Diocese of Ferns has been on a road involving the settlement of claims for 15 years now. It has been very much a team effort – various administrations and personnel, local diocesan and national church funding. Up to 80 per cent of the road of justice has been travelled. As we look to complete this road, it will be necessary to invite the parishes to become part of the process financially."

While the diocese insisted that weekly collections would not contribute towards redress for victims, it was estimated that €60,000 a year would need to be raised from parishioners over a 20-year period, with the alternative being to sell diocesan assets and properties including the bishop's house in Wexford, the seminary at St Peter's College and agricultural land. The balance was eventually paid through diocesan savings, remortgaging the bishop's house and the raising of a €1.8 million loan, while €2.1 million was also spent on legal fees for abuse inquiries, and €836,000 towards the treatment of paedophile priests.

=== 2010 Vatican summit ===
Brennan participated in a meeting with Irish bishops, Pope Benedict XVI and senior members of the Roman Curia from 15 to 16 February 2010 to discuss the publication of the Ryan and Murphy reports in 2009. In an interview on Morning Ireland on RTÉ Radio 1 on 17 February, he referred to the meeting as a "watershed moment" that would redefine the relationship between the Church and abuse victims, adding that a number of points regarding the mishandling of abuse cases by Church authorities were made by bishops "very honestly" in the presence of the Pope:

"The Holy Father has heard the many stories of Irish victims and I can also say they have been believed. To have the Holy Father there for a day and a half and the nine heads of the Vatican congregations shows how seriously the Church is taking the issue."

When asked why certain issues such as episcopal resignations and the findings of the Murphy Report were not addressed, Brennan pointed out that the meeting was primarily a briefing session to aid the Pope in his writing of a forthcoming pastoral letter to Catholics in Ireland, and that such issues were not on the agenda. He was responding to criticism from victims groups who expressed disappointment at the failure of the talks to address several issues relating to the Church's handling of clerical sexual abuse cases.

=== COVID-19 pandemic ===
In a pastoral letter to the people of the diocese in November 2020, Brennan questioned the imposition of a ban on all public worship in Ireland following the introduction of Level 3 restrictions during the COVID-19 pandemic, stating that that Ireland was the only country in Europe where such a ban had been imposed was "clearly sufficient reason to revisit the matter, to reassess its necessity and to re-examine its appropriateness, and to consider the positive benefits of its being lifted".

== Retirement ==
In accordance with canon law, Brennan submitted his episcopal resignation to the Dicastery for Bishops on his 75th birthday on 20 June 2020, but was expected to remain in the see until a successor was appointed.

He subsequently remained in the see until the appointment of his successor, Gerard Nash, on 11 June 2021.

Catholic Church titles
Preceded by Brendan Comiskey	Bishop of Ferns; 2006–2021	Succeeded by Gerard Nash
