= Donal Collins =

Donal Collins was a priest of the Diocese of Ferns. He was appointed principal of St Peter's College, Wexford by Bishop Brendan Comiskey in 1988 despite his removal by Comiskey's predecessor, Bishop Donal J. Herlihy, following allegations of Collins sexually abusing pupils in his charge. The knowledge relating to the earlier allegations does not appear to have been made known to Comiskey.

Collins was a science teacher in St Peters when allegations against him of sexual abuse involving pupils in the school dormitory were made in 1966. He was transferred to a parish in Westminster but the Bishop of Ferns, Donal J. Herlihy did not disclose that allegations had been lodged against Collins, an omission described by The Ferns Report as warranting very serious criticism. Collins returned to St Peters in 1968 and was allowed to fully take up all duties associated with a teacher in a boarding school including mentoring pupils for the Young Scientists' Exhibition, facilitating school trips to the public swimming pool in Ferrybank, Wexford, and accompanying pupils on annual school tours abroad. His nickname among the students was "Slinker". Fourteen pupils are cited in the Ferns Report as being abused by Collins between the 1960s and early 1990s.

The first report subsequent to the 1966 allegations came to Bishop Comiskey's attention within seven months of his appointment as Principal in 1988. Collins resigned as principal in 1991 after an anonymous letter was sent to Comiskey. Comiskey sent Collins for counselling to Florida in 1991. Collins was attached to a parish in Florida during that period.

Collins admitted the abuse in 1993. He was charged in 1995 with 21 counts of indecent assault and gross indecency and one of buggery against four former pupils. Collins served a one-year jail sentence on conviction. He was laicised in 2004 (38 years after sex abuse allegations against him first surfaced). He took civil proceedings by way of judicial review in May 1996, seeking a prohibition of the hearing of the charges. That application was refused. In March 1998, he pleaded guilty to four charges of gross indecency and one of indecent assault. He was sentenced to four years imprisonment and served one year at the Curragh prison. He was released in 1999.

== Death ==
Donal Collins was found dead in his home in County Wexford on the evening of 9 April 2010.

== The Ferns Report ==
Collins was cited in The Ferns Report as one of 12 priests involved in 100 cases of child sexual abuse in the diocese between 1962 and 2002. The Report explains that at least six priests in the Diocese of Ferns and associated with St Peters College were aware of troubling rumours concerning the reasons for Collins removal in 1966 but they did not notify Church authorities in the diocese of the potential danger posed by Collins when his appointment as Principal was suggested. No diocesan records were maintained concerning the removal of Collins from Ferns in 1966. When anonymous allegations against Collins first emerged and in the face of denial by Collins of the sexual allegations against him, Comiskey spent two years seeking evidence to substantiate these. Collins was finally removed in 1991. Comiskey also made erroneous statements to the Gardaí and media concerning Collins against the background of information available to Comiskey.

== See also ==
- Roman Catholic Church sex abuse scandal
- Roman Catholic priests accused of sex offenses
- Crimen sollicitationis
- Pontifical Secret
