= Eugene Green (disambiguation) =

Eugene or Gene Green or Greene may refer to:

- Eugène Green (born 1947), American-born French filmmaker and dramatist
- Gene Green (born 1947), American politician
- Gene Green (baseball) (1933-1981), American Major League Baseball outfielder and catcher
- Eugene Greene, Irish Catholic priest and convicted child abuser
- Gene Greene (1877–1930), American vaudeville and ragtime singer
- Eugene Green, candidate in the 2010 United States House of Representatives elections in Louisiana

== See also ==
- USS Eugene A. Greene (DDR-711), Gearing-class destroyer of the United States Navy
