= Hederman =

Hederman or Hedderman is an Irish surname. Notable people with the surname include:

- Anthony J. Hederman (1921–2014), Irish judge
- Carmencita Hederman (1939–2025), Irish politician
- Mark Patrick Hederman, Irish Benedictine monk and writer
- Miriam Hederman O'Brien (1932–2022), Irish barrister and academic
