= Suing the Pope =

2002 film by Colm O'Gorman

Suing the Pope is a March 2002 documentary by Colm O'Gorman and the BBC which details the abusive activities of priest Sean Fortune and the response of the diocese of Ferns to his activities over the years.

As a result, bishop Brendan Comiskey, the bishop of Ferns, resigned due to his perceived mishandling of the case. He had described Fortune as being "virtually impossible to deal with".

The documentary won an award from the British Academy of Film and Television Arts.

== See also ==
- Sex Crimes and the Vatican
- The Ferns Report
