= McGinnity =

McGinnity is an Irish surname. Notable people with the surname include:

- Gerard McGinnity (born 1947), Irish author and parish priest
- Joe McGinnity (1871–1929), American baseball player
- Mike McGinnity (1941–2016), chairman of Coventry City Football Club
- Connor McGinnity (born 2003) amateur English/Irish Boxer
- Patrick McGinnity (born 1989), Australian rules footballer
- Peter McGinnity (born 1953), Irish Gaelic footballer and manager
