= Chadwicks Wexford Park =

Stadium in Wexford, Ireland

- Páirc Loch Garman
- Interactive map of Chadwicks Wexford Park
- Location: Clonard Road, Wexford, County Wexford, Y35 RT91, Ireland
- Coordinates: 52°19′57″N 6°28′33″W
- Public transit: Wexford railway station
- Owner: Wexford GAA
- Capacity: 18,000

Chadwicks Wexford Park is a GAA stadium in Wexford, County Wexford, Ireland. It is the home of Wexford GAA's Gaelic football and hurling teams. After a recent development the ground has a capacity of 18,000. It is located in the Clonard area on the outskirts of Wexford Town.

In 2015, a local technology company, Innovate Business Technology, bought the naming rights to the stadium. The new name was Innovate Wexford Park. In 2020, Chadwicks builders' providers replaced Innovate as the name sponsor of the stadium.

== Redevelopment ==
In 1997, Wexford received planning permission to redevelop Wexford Park. The redevelopment would cost IR£1 million. It was due to be completed for the National Feile Hurling Finals in 1998. However due to a long overrun, where both end terraces had yet to be constructed, in 2000 they were given an Irish National Lottery grant to cover some of the cost of the overrun. The pitch was discovered to require re-installation of the drainage system as well. The overall cost of the project was IR£3.3 million. The redeveloped stadium was opened in 2001 with a Roman Catholic gathering with a veneration of the relics of Saint Thérèse of Lisieux and it was attended by the Apistolic Nuncio to Ireland, Dr. Giuseppe Lazzarotto and the Bishop of Ferns, Brendan Comiskey.

However, by 2011 the new design of the stadium caused problems. Due to the development including continuous benches along the length of the stand rather than individual seats, it made complying with health and safety regulations difficult due to having to estimate the number of fans that could be accommodated safely. This was seen when there was a Wexford double-header of Gaelic football and hurling with empty spaces in the stands being visible, despite being sold out.

The venue’s first event under newly installed floodlights took place between Wexford and Kilkenny in the 2023 Walsh Cup.

== See also ==
- List of Gaelic Athletic Association stadiums
- List of stadiums in Ireland by capacity
