= Fethard-on-Sea boycott =

Religious controversy in 1957 Ireland

The Fethard-on-Sea boycott was a controversy in 1957 involving Sean and Sheila Cloney (née Kelly), a married couple from the village of Fethard-on-Sea, County Wexford, Ireland. It resulted in a sectarian boycott, led by the local Catholic priest, of some members of the local Protestant community.

== The Cloney family ==
Sean Cloney, a Catholic, came from Dungulf, a short distance to the north of Fethard-on-Sea, while Sheila, a Church of Ireland Protestant, came from Johns Hill in the village itself. They married at an Augustinian church in Hammersmith, London in 1949.

They had three daughters: Mary, Eileen and Hazel, who was born after the controversy.

At the time, non-Catholic spouses of Catholics who wished to be married in the Catholic Church had to agree to bring their children up as Catholics as a result of the Ne Temere decree.

== The boycott ==
Parish priest Fr. Stafford told Sheila Cloney she had to raise her children as Catholics. Sheila refused, leading to her leaving the town with her daughters. The parish priest organised a boycott of the local Protestant population which was endorsed by Bishop Michael Brown. Sheila Cloney went first to Northern Ireland, then Orkney. Eventually Sean traced her to Orkney, they were reconciled and returned to Fethard where their daughters were taught at home.

Éamon de Valera condemned the boycott on 4 July 1957 and called for Mrs Cloney to respect her promise and return with her children to her husband.

Time magazine coined the term "fethardism" to mean a boycott along religious lines in an article on the events.

A 1999 film, A Love Divided, was based on the boycott, with some dramatic licence taken with some events.

== Apology ==
Brendan Comiskey, the Catholic Bishop of Ferns apologised for the boycott in 1998, 41 years after the incident. He asked for forgiveness and expressed "deep sorrow", condemning the actions of the 'church leadership' at the time. The apology was accepted by his Anglican counterpart, Bishop John Neil of Ferns, "in the spirit of Christian love in which it had been offered."

== Father Sean Fortune ==
Sean Cloney was one of the people from the area who complained about the behaviour of Father Seán Fortune, including child sexual abuse and stealing money. Cloney had compiled a dossier on the priest including a list of seventy young people who had been in contact with the priest. Fortune left Fethard in 1987, and died by suicide while on trial in 1999 for a series of sexual abuse charges.

== Deaths ==
The Cloney's eldest daughter, Mary, died in 1998 and Sean Cloney died in October 1999. Sheila Cloney died in June 2009.

== See also ==
- Criticism of the Catholic Church § Requiring children to be raised as Catholics
