= Fethard =

Fethard may refer to:

== Places ==
- Fethard, County Tipperary
- Fethard-on-Sea, County Wexford

== Constituencies ==
- Fethard (County Tipperary) (Parliament of Ireland constituency)
- Fethard (County Wexford) (Parliament of Ireland constituency)

== Sport ==
- Fethard GAA, Gaelic football club in the County Tipperary town
- Fethard St Mogues GAA Club, Gaelic games club in the Wexford village

== Other ==
- Fethard-on-Sea boycott, a 1957 sectarian controversy in the Wexford village
