= Gerard Nash =

Gerard Nash may refer to:

- Gerard Nash (bishop) (born 1959), Irish Catholic prelate and current Bishop of Ferns
- Gerard Nash (footballer) (born 1986), Irish former footballer
