= Intercessors of the Lamb =

US-based Roman Catholic Association

Intercessors of the Lamb, Inc
- Formation: February 12, 1980
- Type: Non-profit religious organization
- Legal status: Non-profit corporation; Association of the Christian faithful within the Roman Catholic Church (until canonically suppressed on October 15, 2010)
- Headquarters: 11811 Calhoun Road; Omaha, Nebraska 68152, United States
- Coordinates: 41.367598°N 95.983230°W
- Founder: Mother Nadine Brown
- Website: www.bellwetheromaha.org

The Hermit Intercessors of the Lamb was a Roman Catholic association of priests, brothers, nuns, and lay people, based in Nebraska, United States. The 1998 canonical organization was suppressed by Omaha Archbishop George Joseph Lucas in 2010 and no longer exists. The 1980 legal organization, Intercessors of the Lamb, Inc., continues to exist but is disassociated from the Roman Catholic Church. The group continues to operate as a non-denominational Christian organisation in the Ponca Hills neighbourhood of Omaha.

== History ==
=== Foundation ===
The Intercessors of the Lamb were founded in 1980. They trace their spiritual charism back to Saint John Eudes's Congregation of Jesus and Mary.

The foundress of the Intercessors, Nadine Mae Brown (Mother Nadine), after an adult conversion to Catholicism, felt called to join the cloistered religious in the Sisters of the Cross, a contemplative branch of the Congregation of the Good Shepherd. In 1976, Brown discerned that she was being called to bring a deeper relationship with God to the faithful beyond the religious Orders.

She left the order and with permission from then Archbishop of Omaha, Daniel Eugene Sheehan, began to implement a different ministry, living and teaching contemplative spirituality and its intercessory lifestyle. A local family later offered their carriage house, which served as a hermitage for Nadine, and their log cabin, which allowed for others to have communal intercessory prayer and also make individual retreats.

Nadine authored many books, tapes and materials in order to help in the instruction of contemplation. She particularly emphasized the task of spiritual warfare. Among her publications are Bathe Seven Times: A Contemplative Look at the Seven Capitals Sins (2003) and God's Armor (1998).

The Intercessors of the Lamb were canonically erected on 27 May 1978 as a public Association of the Christian faithful under Archbishop Elden Francis Curtiss. Commensurate with a Roman Catholic lay ecclesial movement, this would have been one of the steps to the society's recognition as an Institute of Consecrated Life.

A separate legal entity, Intercessors of the Lamb, Inc., was incorporated in 1980 with the full permission of Archbishop Sheehan. The corporation manages the business affairs of the community and received its tax-exempt status in 1980. The corporation retained ownership of the Bellwether property after the suppression, and owns property outside the United States.

=== Bellwether Center ===
In 1984, the growing community acquired 11 acres (4.5 ha) and two houses in the Ponca Hills area north of Omaha, Nebraska. This became the Bellwether Contemplative Formation Center, referred to as "Bellwether". Over the course of the next 25 years, Bellwether grew to be a 75 acres (30 ha) Contemplative Formation Center, which currently has two large retreat houses, a chapel, two residence homes, and a building to accommodate groups desiring the spiritual formation and ministry. A "spirit of prayer, penance, silence and solitude" are promoted at Bellwether and serve as the "four pillars" of the contemplative way of life.

In 1994, Intercessors of the Lamb hosted its first annual international Workshop of Contemplative, Intercessory and Spiritual Warfare Prayer at Omaha.

=== Canonical visitation, suppression, and reorganization ===
A request by Nadine Brown to the Roman Catholic Archdiocese of Omaha in 2010 to have the group made a full religious Institute led to a canonical visitation conducted by Reverend James Conn, a Jesuit and noted canon lawyer.

Several issues at the community were noted in his report. On September 30, 2010 Archbishop George Joseph Lucas requested the resignation of Nadine Brown from both the corporation's board and the Association, and she complied. He appointed an Omaha priest, Fr. Gregory Baxter as temporary trustee of the Association.

Archbishop Lucas wished to bring the organization into conformity with Catholic canon law. Because most of the directors of the civil Board refused to allow the reforms, Lucas decreed the suppression of Hermit Association of the Intercessors of the Lamb on October 15. Lucas stated that the vows of the members ceased at the moment of suppression. The Bellwether chapel is no longer recognised by the Archdiocese.

Forty-eight members of the community left Bellwether that day to accept temporary housing offered by the Archdiocese. They lived on the former campus of Dana College in Blair, Nebraska, as "the Intercessor Relief Community". Several other members decided to leave religious life and by 2012, the Relief community consisted of nine sisters. The priests went back into various parishes and the brothers left the group.

A new community endorsed by the Archdiocese, "Brides of the Victorious Lamb", was formed in February 2012 and was located at St. Mary's Convent, Omaha. The group developed a charism of ministering and providing spiritual support to the sick, elderly and dying and their families, but disbanded in 2019.

Nadine Brown left Bellwether on 5 October 2010. Two days after the suppression, she and ten hermits returned to the centre. They re-organised the community as "Intercessors of the Lamb, Inc.". Their aim was to continue to promote contemplative spirituality, communal intercession and spiritual warfare prayer, providing retreats and spiritual guidance.

A July Prayer Weekend was held in 2011 at Bellwether, followed up with an Advent Prayer Weekend the same year. A Spiritual Warfare Workshop took place in July 2012 and workshops have continued each year along with sales of religious material.

Mother Nadine Brown died on 3 June 2013 at the age of 83.

As of March 2015, there were 20 full-time individuals, from various backgrounds and nationalities and mostly female, who refer to themselves informally as the "Bellwether Lambs". There are also many individuals from around the world who actively participate in the ministry, in their respective prayer circles. As of December 2022 Mary Elizabeth Weaver was the General Director of the corporation and President of the Board of Directors, and Judith Sellers was the Treasurer.

== Charism ==
The society's particular ministry, or spiritual charism, is the promotion of contemplative spirituality and the provision of spiritual guidance, with the aim of inspiring spiritual renewal among Catholics. The priests, deacons, brothers, and nuns of the order called themselves hermits, and live with a "desert spirituality", a commitment that includes public vows of "chastity, poverty, obedience and zeal for the salvation of souls". The main apostolate of the association is prayer for priests. There was also a clear emphasis on spiritual warfare or deliverance ministry.

The group maintained an international network of "Companion" groups that prayed in unity with the Intercessors, especially for priests, and new vocations to the priesthood. The Companions were not canonically recognised, some have continued their work beyond the suppression.

The religious habit of the Intercessors is a teal scapular; the merging of the colors green, for the earth, and blue, for heaven expressed the society's role as intercessors .

== Criticisms ==
During 2004, some neighbours to the Bellwether Contemplative Formation Center opposed their plans to build four group homes, the chapel (Our Lady of Light) and 18 hermitages.

There are allegations that many members signed over their assets to the Intercessors before 2010. Comparisons have been made between the Intercessors and the characteristics of a religious cult.

The Intercessors of the Lamb have a distinctly Catholic Charismatic Renewal piety. CatholicCulture.com noted the society's emphasis on Medjugorje and its "uncritical focus on an exclusively charismatic spirituality".

== See also ==
- House of Prayer, Achill
