= Gerard McGinnity =

Irish Catholic priest

Father Gerard McGinnity, born on 5 April 1947, is an Irish Roman Catholic priest, currently serving as parish priest of Knockbridge, County Louth, Ireland, a parish of the Archdiocese of Armagh. He is best known for his role in denouncing the alleged homosexual orientation of the head of a Catholic seminary, and for his association with a group, the House of Prayer, Achill.

== In Maynooth College ==
McGinnity was appointed junior dean at St Patrick's College, Maynooth, Ireland's national seminary, when he was 26 years old. He was appointed senior dean at the age of 32 in 1978, decades younger than previous holders of the post.

In 1984, he raised concerns with bishops about the sexuality of the college's vice-president, Dr Micheál Ledwith. After his complaint was dismissed in the absence of any evidence, McGinnity was required to leave his position by Tomás Ó Fiaich, archbishop of his home diocese, acting on behalf of the trustees (17 bishops) of the college.

Several seminarians sought the advice of Brendan Comiskey, then auxiliary Bishop of Dublin and later Bishop of Ferns, about the lifestyle of Ledwith and their concerns that he might be gay. Comiskey suggested that they approach seven "key bishops" in order that their concerns be adequately heard. These bishops included the Cardinal Primate of All Ireland Tomás Ó Fiaich and Bishops Cahal Daly, Edward Daly, Lennon, Cassidy, C O'Reilly, Eamon Casey and Aherne.

Ledwith was appointed president of St Patrick's in 1984. In 1994, he resigned prematurely and agreed a financial settlement – without liability – with a man who alleged Ledwith had abused him as a minor, and later left the Church.

== The McCullough and Ferns Reports ==
The Irish bishops published the McCullough Report in June 2005. It found that there were no complaints made by any seminarian about sexual harassment by Ledwith in Maynooth.

The concerns raised by McGinnity were fully validated in the report of the Ferns Inquiry which was commissioned by the Irish Government in 2003 and published in October 2005. The Ferns Report acknowledged Dr McGinnity's feelings of being victimised as a result of the concerns of the seminarians which he expressed. The report states that "punitive actions of that nature could only deter bona fide complaints to church authorities which should be valued as providing information for the control of those having access to young people".

The matter was further debated in the Irish Senate in November 2005 and Dr Mary Henry commented:

With regard to Monsignor Ledwith, I was dismayed to read the response of the bishops to whom complaints were made by six senior seminarians, as they are described in the report, as well as the senior dean of Maynooth College, Fr. Gerard McGinnity. Cardinal Daly, one of the surviving bishops, indicated in his statement to the inquiry that it was entirely untrue that any seminarian had mentioned homosexuality to him in connection with Monsignor Ledwith.

== Association with House of Prayer ==
McGinnity has for many years been 'spiritual director' to Christina Gallagher, the owner of the Our Lady Queen of Peace House of Prayer (Achill) Ltd, a group not linked to the structures of the Catholic Church. He co-authored Gallagher's biography published in 1996, in which he refers to her as "God's prophet".

Christina Gallagher's 'House of Prayer' is based on Achill Island. On 29 February 2008, the Archbishop of Tuam, Michael Neary, issued a statement saying, in part: "In summary the 'House of Prayer' has no Church approval and the work does not enjoy the confidence of the diocesan authorities."

Beginning in March 2008, Cardinal Seán Brady, Primate of All Ireland, began holding discussions with McGinnity about his association with Christina Gallagher. His inquiry into the matter was the result of some complaints from former followers of Christina Gallagher.

== Publications ==
- Celebration With Mary: Reflections for Personal Prayer and Parish Devotions (June 1987) ISBN 0-86217-289-6
- Open Door for Christ (June 1987) ISBN 0-86217-277-2
- Christmen: Experience of Priesthood Today (June 1985) ISBN 0-906127-94-7
- Out of the Ecstasy & Onto the Cross – Biography of Christina Gallagher (1996) Our Lady Queen of Peace Publications, Ltd.

== See also ==
- Catholic Church sexual abuse cases
