= McCullough Report =

2005 report on sexual misconduct allegations

The McCullough Report is a report published by the Irish Roman Catholic bishops in June 2005 following allegations of homosexual sexual abuse between seminarians and staff at St Patrick's College, Maynooth in Ireland. The report looked at how the college responded to the allegations, and found that no specific allegations of sexual abuse had been made. Instead it found that the allegations were focused on the alleged lifestyle and possible "homosexual tendencies" of Micheál Ledwith, at the time vice-president of the college, and that the dean of the college, Gerard McGinnity, had expressed non-specific concerns about possible improprieties in Ledwith's relationship with some students. Although the report did not find that there were allegations of sexual harassment made against Ledwith, it did find that the concerns raised by McGinnity were not adequately investigated.

== Background ==
The inquiry leading to this report was commissioned by the bishops of following media reports that complaints of sexual harassment of junior seminarians at Maynooth in the early 1980s had not received a proper response. Micheál Ledwith, who at the time of the alleged complaints had been vice-president of St Patrick's College, Maynooth, had, it was claimed, been the subject of complaints relating to the possible sexual harassment of some students at the college. Students were alleged to have raised concerns with a number of bishops, who then failed to investigate the claims. These complaints were also said to have been raised by Dr. Gerard McGinnity, the dean of the college. However, it was alleged that McGinnity's concerns were similarly ignored. Shortly thereafter McGinnity took a twelve-month sabbatical, and instead of returning to his previous position at the college he was transferred to a rural parish.

== Process ==
In June 2002, Denis McCullough SC was retained by the bishops to investigate the allegations that those complaints had not received a proper response. McCullough was not asked to investigate whether or not incidents of sexual harassment had occurred, but had a brief that was limited to investigating the if complaints were made any responses that emerged from those complaints. As part of his investigation, McCullough approached the five seminarians who were believed to have been the core group who raised concerns, McGinnity, all of the surviving bishops who had been involved with alleged the complaints, and Micheál Ledwith. One of the seminarians was not interviewed as part of the inquiry as the individual concerned chose not to be involved, and McGinnity did not contribute to this inquiry. In addition to the interviews, McCullough examined documentary records, including Minutes and correspondence.

The report took over three years to complete, and was released on 16 June 2005.

== Findings ==
McCullough's report found that none of those interviewed had made complaints about sexual harassment in regard to Micheál Ledwith. Those interviewed stated that they were unaware of any such allegations, and had not related them to the bishops, trustees, or McGinnity. The complaints were more general, focused on apparent propensities rather than specific criminal acts, and were related to his apparent extravagant lifestyle and alleged "homosexual tendencies".

Nevertheless, the report also found that McGinnity may have expressed concerns about possible improprieties in Ledwith's relationship with some students, although once again it was in terms of general propensities rather than any specific claims. When McGinnity was asked to produce a student to substantiate these allegations, McGinnity was unable to do so. According to the report, it seems that the lack of evidence meant that those looking into the issue felt that there was no foundation to the allegations, and subsequently McGinnity went on sabbatical. In his findings, McCullough concluded "that to have rejected the senior dean's concerns so completely and so abruptly without any adequate investigation may have been too precipitate, although, of course, to investigate in any very full or substantial manner, a generic complaint regarding a person's apparent propensities would have been difficult".

== Responses ==
The Archbishop of Armagh, Cardinal Seán Brady stated, following the publication of The McCullough Report, that "those seminarians who expressed concern in the early eighties were acting in good faith. We regret any hurt felt by those involved and that the investigation in 1984 was not more thorough".

Later in 2005 the Ferns Report was published and dealt in part with the allegations made by the seminarians against Micheal Ledwith. Dr. Ginnity was interviewed this time, and at section 4.6 the report states that the seminarians made "no specific allegations" but "had an anxiety with regard to orientation and propensity rather than with specific sexual activity."
