= Micheál Ledwith =

Irish Catholic priest

Micheál Ledwith (whose first name is often reported as Michael) is a former Catholic priest of the Diocese of Ferns in County Wexford from 1967 to 2005.

== Early years at Maynooth ==
After a promising academic start he was promoted rapidly and served for a time as dean of St Peter's Diocesan College in Wexford. In 1977 he was appointed to a senior lectureship in Dogmatic Theology at St Patrick's College, Maynooth under the college president, Dr Tomás Ó Fiaich. He remained at Maynooth for the next 16 years and advanced quickly up the ladder of offices, serving a term as dean of the Faculty of Theology, before being appointed to the chair of systematic theology and later a college vice-president.

In 1985 Dr Ó Fiaich, by then Cardinal Archbishop of Armagh and one of the trustees of Maynooth, approved his appointment to the post of president of Maynooth, which office carried an ex officio pro-vice-chancellorship of the National University of Ireland and membership of the Conference of the Heads of Irish Universities.

== President of Maynooth ==
The presidency of Maynooth was, in 1985 when Ledwith was appointed to the role, a senior position within the Catholic Church in Ireland. Only 44, he proved a capable administrator at Maynooth; immediately prior to his resignation he presided over the separation of the National University of Ireland, Maynooth and St Patrick's College, Maynooth. He was regarded within the Church as a progressive and in 1988 he was seen as a serious contender for the vacant see of Dublin following the sudden death of Archbishop Kevin McNamara. His name was submitted to Rome as one of three possible candidates.

There was considerable surprise following the appointment of a University College Dublin academic, Professor Desmond Connell.

Ledwith was then appointed a domestic prelate with the title of monsignor, and served for 17 years under Pope John Paul II as a member of the International Theological Commission, a group of theologians of international standing charged with advising the Holy See on theological matters. He also served as chairman of the Conference of the Heads of Irish Universities and as a member of the Governing Bureau of the Conference of European University Rectors (CRE).

== Resignation and abuse allegation ==
In 1994 as St Patrick's College, Maynooth approached its bicentenary due to be held the following year, Ledwith resigned as president, six months before his term of office was to end.

In 1995, the Irish National Broadcaster, RTÉ, initiated inquiries with the college authorities into an allegation of sexual abuse of a minor male. The senior management at St Patrick's College, Maynooth initially said that this had not occasioned Ledwith's departure, however in response to later revelations in the press Ledwith's successor, Dermot Farrell and the Episcopal Trustees of the college issued a joint statement in 2002 admitting that an allegation had been made. Ledwith, they noted, had denied this strenuously but the college authorities had nevertheless commenced an investigation, and his Bishop, Brendan Comiskey, had at the time informed both the Gardaí and the relevant Health Board.

This process of investigation had commenced in or around 1995 but Ledwith, in the interim, came to a private legal settlement with the claimant which admitted no liability and included a confidentiality clause. This, they said, frustrated the continuing inquiry. Ledwith remained in situ at the college for another two years after his resignation, and continued his professorship.

== Gerard McGinnity ==
In 1997 Ledwith and the college reached a mutual understanding for a parting of ways, and he was awarded a pension top-up of £100,000. He also agreed to leave his rooms on the college campus at this time. In 2002 the Irish media reported that a former seminarian was suing Mgr Ledwith over "an alleged incident" in 1994, after Ledwith's resignation. The 2005 Ferns Report noted that the ex-student later withdrew the allegation and dropped the lawsuit.

Controversies surrounding Ledwith's appointment as president of St Patrick's College, Maynooth in 1985 were discussed in the national media in 2002. It emerged that in 1983–84 Gerard McGinnity, then senior dean of Maynooth, complained about Ledwith to seven bishops including the bishop of Ferns, Brendan Comiskey, who was championing Ledwith's appointment, Cardinal Tomás Ó Fiaich and Bishop Cahal Daly. The 2005 Ferns Report said that the complaints related to alleged homosexual "orientation and propensity" rather than any improper conduct. The then Bishop of Galway, Dr Eamon Casey, conducted a private investigation, and as no seminarian came forward to make a complaint, the matter was dropped. In the immediate aftermath, as McGinnity's position was deemed untenable, he was required to leave the college, and Ledwith's appointment was confirmed.

In response to the 2002 reports, the bishop trustees took an opportunity to re-examine the process of appointment, and retained Denis McCullough senior counsel to investigate whether the complaints made against Ledwith had received an adequate response. McCullough's report, published on 16 June 2005, found that, while no seminarian had complained about Ledwith's conduct to the bishops directly, McGinnity had communicated "concerns of apparent propensities rather than accusations of actual crime or specific offences" to a number of bishops. McCullough concluded that

to have rejected the senior dean's concerns so completely and so abruptly without any adequate investigation may have been too precipitate, although, of course, to investigate in any very full or substantial manner, a generic complaint regarding a person's apparent propensities would have been difficult.

The bishop's report, whilst critical, was found wanting in key respects and the matter was eventually debated in the Irish Senate in November 2005. Senator Mary Henry said:

With regard to Monsignor Ledwith, I was dismayed to read the response of the bishops to whom complaints were made by six senior seminarians, as they are described in the report, as well as the senior dean of Maynooth College, Fr Gerard McGinnity. Cardinal Daly, one of the surviving bishops, indicated in his statement to the inquiry that it was entirely untrue that any seminarian had mentioned homosexuality to him in connection with Monsignor Ledwith.

== Ferns Report ==
In 2005 the Ferns Report by a High Court judge, Mr Justice Murphy, into the activities of certain priests of the Diocese of Ferns included various allegations made against Mgr Ledwith. In connection with the accusation of sexual abuse against a minor; the inquiry was hampered by the confidentiality clause agreed between Ledwith and the complainant, and the Ferns Report was unable to make any specific finding. It did, however, repeat the substance of accusations and noted that the complainant had alleged that the abuse began when he was 13 years old and lasted until he was 15. The inquiry discovered that the Diocese of Ferns had spent substantial monies providing counselling for the complainant, and noted that Fr Walter Forde, who had investigated the allegation on behalf of the Diocese, reported to Bishop Brendan Comiskey that he found the accusation as 'capable of being true'.

In response, Comiskey ordered Ledwith to attend a treatment centre in the United States in 1994, but he declined and commenced proceedings against Comiskey under canon law. This resulted in the diocesan investigation ceasing as the complaint was discovered to be outside the Canonical Statute of Limitations, and Bishop Comiskey declined to pursue the matter by other means at his disposal. In connection with the parallel investigation undertaken by the Maynooth authorities Mgr Ledwith was initially open to a proposal waiving the confidentiality clause agreed with the complainant in the civil application, and this was also agreed to by the complainant. However Ledwith subsequently changed his mind as he was dissatisfied with the conduct of the sub-committee of Trustees appointed to investigate.

After a lengthy investigation he was summoned to the Archbishop's House in Dublin for further questioning, and attended with a solicitor and two Senior Counsel. There he informed the Sub-Committee that he felt that the procedure adopted was fundamentally flawed and unfair from the perspective of civil and canon law and he submitted his resignation as president of Maynooth. The Ferns Report, while making no comment on the substance of the allegation, was highly critical of Ledwith's behaviour and stated that "as with many other priests accused of child abuse" Ledwith "attacked the process rather than facing any charges".

The committee also examined the McGinnity affair and found inconsistencies in the evidence presented to the commission by the surviving bishops from 1985 and the seven former seminarians. The bishops emphatically denied that there had been any allegations known of homosexual activity, whereas the former seminarians and McGinnity in evidence directly contradicted the bishops' submission. Ledwith, in his own evidence to the commission, confirmed that Comiskey had informed him that a charge of homosexuality had been made against him. At the time he had approached Cardinal Ó Fiaich, who was McGinnity's Bishop, and they had discussed the matter. He also asserted to the inquiry that McGinnity had been dismissed from his post not because of this incident, but rather due to grave concerns about indiscipline within the college during his time as senior dean.

The inquiry also investigated a serious allegation made by one seminarian in 1994 and concluded that in this instance the complainant had proved unreliable. It was noted that the complainant had changed his statement to police and admitted that any alleged sexual activity had been consensual. The commission also noted that Ledwith had co-operated fully with the inquiry and had given direct oral evidence, where he had consistently asserted his innocence of all charges, though he declined to discuss any issues subject to a confidentiality clause. While critical, the inquiry was unable to make any specific finding against Ledwith in regard to either the allegation of child abuse or the alleged harassment of seminarians.

The sudden resignation of Micheál Ledwith in 1994 caused controversy in Ireland, and led to considerable criticism of the way the matter was handled by the Irish Hierarchy.

In 2010 the appointment of an Apostolic Visitation from the Holy See to the Irish Church was charged, amongst other things, with investigating all Irish seminaries, and St Patrick's College, Maynooth in particular.

== Post Maynooth career ==
In 2002 Patsy McGarry, religious affairs correspondent of the Irish Times, reported that Ledwith was lecturing with a New Age cult in the United States, and in 2005 he was laicised. Since that time he has lectured in Australia, Canada, Denmark, England, Ecuador, France, Germany, Ireland, Italy, Japan, Mexico, Scotland, Spain, South Africa, Switzerland, and throughout Canada and the United States. He has taught at Ramtha's School of Enlightenment.

Ledwith appears in What the Bleep Do We Know!?, its sequel Down the Rabbit Hole, and Contact Has Begun. He has worked on three DVDs relating to spiritual evolution: The Hamburger Universe in 2005, How Jesus Became a Christ in 2006, and Orbs: Clues to a More Exciting Universe in 2008. His book The Orb Project, co-authored with a German physicist, Dr Klaus Heinemann, was published by Simon & Schuster/Beyond Words in 2007.
