= Gerard Nash (bishop) =

Irish Catholic bishop

The Most Reverend Gerard Nash
- Bishop of Ferns and Bishop of Ossory
- Church: Roman Catholic
- See: Ferns, Ossory
- Appointed: 11 June 2021 and 29 July 2026
- Installed: 5 September 2021 and 13 September 2026
- Predecessor: Denis Brennan and Niall Coll
- Previous posts: General Manager of Clarecare; Secretary of the Diocese of Killaloe; Episcopal Vicar for Pastoral Development in the Diocese of Killaloe

Orders
- Ordination: 15 June 1991 by Michael Harty
- Consecration: 5 September 2021 by Dermot Farrell

Personal details
- Born: 27 February 1959 (age 67) Tulla, County Clare, Ireland
- Education: NIHE Limerick; St Patrick's College, Maynooth
- Motto: I síth agus muintearas Íosa (In the peace and compansionship of Jesus)

Ordination history of Gerard Nash
History
Diaconal ordination
- Ordained by: Michael Smith
Priestly ordination
- Ordained by: Michael Harty
Episcopal consecration
- Principal consecrator: Dermot Farrell
- Co-consecrators: Denis Brennan; Fintan Monahan

Styles of Gerard Nash
- Reference style: The Most Reverend
- Spoken style: Your Grace
- Religious style: Bishop

Gerard Nash (born 27 February 1959) is an Irish Catholic bishop. He was appointed Bishop of Ferns on 11 June 2021 and consecrated on 5 September 2021. He was also appointed Bishop of Ossory on 29 July 2026 and began his ministry on 13 September 2026.

== Early life ==
Nash was born in Glandree, in the parish of Tulla, County Clare, on 27 February 1959, one of four children to the late Tommy and Mary Nash. He has three sisters, one of whom predeceased him. Nash attended St Joseph's Secondary School in Tulla, where he completed his Leaving Certificate. He then studied business and economics at the National Institute of Higher Education in Limerick, and worked afterwards in the manufacturing industry. He subsequently attended seminary for the Diocese of Killaloe at St Patrick's College, Maynooth, and was ordained to the Catholic priesthood on 15 June 1991.

== Presbyteral ministry ==
Nash's first pastoral assignment was as chaplain of the vocational school in Roscrea, and as priest responsible for the local youth centre. After five years, he was appointed general manager of Clarecare, a non-profit enterprise which provides a range of social services to people in County Clare, a position he held until 2003. Nash was also appointed curate in Corofin in 1996, before being appointed resident priest in 2003, as part of the first grouping of parishes in the Diocese of Killaloe. He remained as resident priest in the newly created Imeall Bóirne pastoral area when he moved to Crusheen in 2007.

Nash was appointed Diocesan Secretary in 2010, while continuing his ministry in Imeall Bóirne. He was appointed episcopal vicar for pastoral development for the diocese in 2016.

== Episcopal ministry ==
Nash was appointed Bishop-elect of Ferns by Pope Francis on 11 June 2021, succeeding Denis Brennan. He was consecrated by the Archbishop of Dublin, Dermot Farrell, on 5 September in St. Aidan's Cathedral, Enniscorthy.

== See also ==
- Catholic Hierarchy
- GCatholic
  Catholic Church titles
  Preceded by Denis Brennan and Niall Coll	Bishop of Ferns and Bishop of Ossory since 2021 and 2025	Succeeded by Incumbent
