= Amnesty International Ireland =

- Type: Non-Governmental Organisation
- Location: Ireland
- Executive Director: Stephen Bowen
- Parent organisation: Amnesty International
- Website: Official website

Amnesty International Ireland (commonly known as Amnesty and AI) is the Irish branch of the international non-governmental organisation focused on human rights, Amnesty International.

== History ==
One of the founding members of the branch was German Abwehr agent Helmut Clissmann. Until June 2022, the executive director was Colm O'Gorman. In August 2023, Stephen Bowen became Executive Director.

== Campaigns ==
Amnesty operate a number of campaigns focusing on human rights issues.

=== Abortion rights ===
The She is not a criminal campaign opposes the Republic of Ireland's abortion law, as according to Amnesty, "Ireland’s Constitution and abortion legislation result in violations of the fundamental human rights of women and girls. Ireland has one of the world’s most restrictive abortion laws. Women and girls cannot legally have an abortion in Ireland unless there is a risk to their life. And even where that is the case, access is difficult."

The campaign was prompted in part due to criticism of Ireland's abortion laws by the UN Committee on Economic, Social and Cultural Rights (CESCR) and the Committee Against Torture. The CESCR has criticised what it described as Ireland's "highly restrictive legislation on abortion and its strict interpretation thereof", and its "criminalization of abortion, including in the cases of rape and incest and of risk to the health of a pregnant woman." It recommended that Ireland take all necessary steps, including a referendum on abortion, to revise its legislation on abortion. It also raised concerns at the impact on women and girls of the law on access to and information about abortion, and how the constitutional protection afforded to the foetus also impacted on maternity care. Abortion is constitutionally permitted only when a woman's or girl's life is at 'real and substantial risk', and carries a possible 14-year prison sentence in all other circumstances.

=== Controversy over foreign donations ===
In December 2017 newspapers reported that the Standards in Public Office Commission informed Amnesty Ireland that this breached Ireland's campaign finance laws which prohibit foreign donors making donations to groups in Ireland who influence government policy. The George Soros Open Society Foundation funding had previously been publicly reported on its website and 2016 annual report. The commission had frequently stated in its reports that this provision is overly wide and cannot have been the intention of the legislature, except where groups are involved in campaigning at elections or referendums. Amnesty Ireland stated that they were not going to obey the commission's instruction to return the funding, as it considered it a violation of its – and other Irish NGOs' – rights to freedom of association and expression.

Amnesty initiated a High Court challenge to SIPO's instruction. The case was heard in July 2018 and as part of the settlement agreement, the High Court heard that SIPO now accepts its decision that the donation was for political purposes and must be returned was "procedurally flawed". Amnesty said it was pleased that the decision has been quashed and that it was vindicated in its decision to challenge the decision. Amnesty also said that it hopes the Government will reform the Electoral Act.

=== Refugees ===
Amnesty's I Welcome Refugees campaign supports refugees and asylum seekers. The campaign promotes resettlement policies by Ireland and the international community and focuses on three main areas:

- Family reunification – this means refugees can join close relatives already living abroad.
- Academic scholarships and study visas, allowing refugees to start or carry on studying.
- Medical visas, to help someone with a serious condition get life-saving treatment.

=== Other campaigns ===
- Opposition to torture;
- Opposition to capital punishment;
- A campaign to free Ibrahim Halawa, an Irish citizen imprisoned for four years in Egypt, without proper trial. He was ultimately acquitted of all charges in September 2017, and released in mid-October. He said on his return to Dublin that he would work for other people imprisoned overseas.

== See also ==
- Amnesty International
