= W. H. Grattan Flood =

Irish music historian and composer (1857–1928)

Chevalier W. H. Grattan Flood
- Born: William Henry Grattan Flood; Lismore, County Waterford, Ireland
- Baptised: 1 November 1857
- Died: 6 August 1928 (aged 68); Enniscorthy, County Wexford, Ireland
- Spouses: Catherine Bell (m. 1878–1880) Margaret Delaney (m. 1898)
- Children: 6
- Awards: Pro Ecclesia et Pontifice

Chevalier William Henry Grattan Flood (baptised 1 November 1857 – 6 August 1928) was an Irish author, composer, musicologist and historian. As a writer and ecclesiastical composer, his personal contributions to Irish music produced enduring works, although he is regarded today as controversial due to the inaccuracy of some of his work. As a historian, his output was prolific on topics of local and national historical or biographical interest.

In 1917, Flood was awarded the papal cross Pro Ecclesia et Pontifice by Pope Benedict XV and in 1922 was elevated by Pope Leo XIII to the Order of St Gregory with the title Chevalier, thereafter he was often called "Chevalier Flood".

== Biography ==
Flood was born in Lismore, County Waterford, Ireland. His family had a great influence on his education. He was born to William and Catherine (FitzSimon) Flood, the Master and Matron of the Lismore Union Workhouse. He had one older sister (Maria), and five brothers (Francis (his twin brother), Patrick, Frederick, George and James (who died in infancy). Flood received his elementary education at his grandfather's (Andrew FitzSimon) boys academy in Lismore, and was given music lessons by his aunt, Elizabeth FitzSimon. He quickly became an accomplished pianist and, at the age of nine, was invited to give a recital for the Duke of Devonshire at Lismore Castle. He entered Mount Melleray in 1872 and graduated in 1876. During this time, he received private tuition in music from Sir Robert Prescott Stewart (1825–1894) and developed proficiency on other musical instruments. He was organist of St. Peter's Pro-Cathedral in Belfast (1878–82), the Cathedral of the Assumption in Thurles, County Tipperary (1882–8), Monaghan Cathedral (1888–94) and St. Aidan's Cathedral, Enniscorthy (from September 1895). A devout Catholic, Flood entered St. Patrick's in Carlow, County Carlow and spent several years studying for the priesthood. He taught music at the Jesuit Colleges of Tullabeg, County Offaly (1882–4), Clongowes Wood College (from 1884), St MacCartan's College, Monaghan (from 1888), and St. Kieran's College in Kilkenny. During his long residency at Enniscorthy (1895–1928) Flood authored the majority of his musical compositions and historical publications. Flood was awarded an honorary Doctor of Music (DMus) from the Royal University of Ireland in 1907.

While he was organist and musical director at St. Aidan's Cathedral in Enniscorthy. He transcribed the Wexford Carol from a local singer and had it published in The Oxford Book of Carols, putting Enniscorthy into most carol books around the world.

In December 1898, he married Margaret Delaney and, over the next 12 years, the couple had six children, including Catherine (Kathleen), Mollie, Agnes, William, Patrick and Margaret (Rita). Following his death, his daughter, Kathleen, assumed the position of organist at St. Aidan's until her death in 1956.

Flood is a highly controversial figure in Irish musicology. He has undoubtedly inspired a lot of more recent research, but "his appreciation of detail was enthusiastic rather than thorough, and the contents of his books were often distorted by his national and religious commitment". Although he is known to have had access to sources in the Public Record Office which burnt down in the Irish Civil War in 1922, "he renders himself untrustworthy by the fact that, where his sources can be checked, he sometimes misquotes or misinterprets them; and he is too ready to jump to conclusions which are presented as if they were facts." On the other hand, he wrote "at a time when it [i.e. Irish music] was either scorned or ignored, except by a few enthusiasts." Flood's most adventurous claims included an "Irish Ancestry of Garland, Dowland, Campion and Purcell". Therefore, his writings on musical history may need to be met with some caution.

== Selected publications ==
Musicology

- A History of Irish Music, (Dublin: Browne and Nolan, 1913; Repr. Shannon: Irish University Press, 1970)
- The Story of the Harp (London: Walter Scott & New York: Charles Scribner's Sons, 1905; Repr. Boston, 1977)
- The Story of the Bagpipe (London: Walter Scott & New York: Charles Scribner's Sons, 1911)
- William Vincent Wallace. A Memoir (Waterford: At the offices of the Waterford News, 1912)
- John Field, Inventor of the Nocturne (Dublin: Martin Lester, 1921)
- Introductory Sketch of Irish Musical History (London: William Reeves, n.d. [1922])
- Early Tudor Composers (Oxford: Oxford University Press & London: Humphrey Milford, 1925)
- John and William Neale, Music Printers, 1721–1741 (Wexford: Bibliographical Society of Ireland, 1928)
- Articles in Dictionary of National Biography, Grove's Dictionary of Music and Musicians (5 vols., London, 1904–1910), Music and Letters, Musical Herald, Musical Opinion, Musical Quarterly, The Musical Times.

General and local history

- History of Enniscorthy (Enniscorthy: Flood, 1898)
- Memoir of Father James Dixon (Melbourne: The Australian Catholic Truth Society, 1912)
- History of the Diocese of Ferns (Waterford: Downey, 1916)
- Articles in Archivium Hibernicum (1912–5), The Athenaeum Saturday Review, Ave Maria, The Catholic Encyclopedia, Cork Archaeological Journal, Cork Historical Journal, Ecclesiastical Review, English Historical Review, Irish Theological Quarterly, Irish Ecclesiastical Record, The Irish Monthly, The Irish Rosary, Journal of the County Louth Archaeological Society, Journal of the Royal Society of Antiquaries of Ireland, The Month, The Past, The Review of English Studies, Studies, Waterford Archaeological Journal, etc.

== Compositions ==
Worklist from Boydell (2013), p. 395; with additions taken from the online catalogues of the National Library of Ireland and the British Library.

Church music

- O salutaris hostia, London, 1882
- Benediction Service: In honorem Sancti Stanislai, London, 1882
- Benediction Service: In honorem Sancti Cuthberti, Newbury: A. Cary, 1889
- Mass in Honour of Saint Aidan op. 32, Leipzig: C.G. Röder, 1889
- Mass in Honour of Saint Carthage, unpublished, n.d.
- Mass in Honour of Saint Wilfred, unpublished, n.d.
- Clongowes Wood College Song (1914)
- Praised Be Jesus Christ Our King (Patrick Brennann), London: Novello and Co., 1927
- Consider Well (date?), carol for unaccompanied male voice choir with optional soprano solo, Wendover: Roberton Publications, 1976
- Many madrigals, hymns, organ transcriptions etc.

Songs

- Evening Shades (Frederick H. Houston), London, 1882
- The Mississippi River (L.M. Mills), Dublin: Cramer, Wood & Co., 1910
- The Boys of Kerry (J.F. Fuller), Dublin: Pigott & Co., c.1915
- Irishmen All
- Our Loved Ones Far Away (T.D. Sullivan)

Editions

- Moore's Irish Melodies (Dublin, 1910)
- The Spirit of the Nation (Dublin, 1911)
- Songs and Airs of O'Carolan (Dublin, 1913)
- The Armagh Hymnal (Dublin: Catholic Truth Society of Ireland, 1915)
- Ireland's Own Song Book (Dublin, 1917)

== Memorial ==
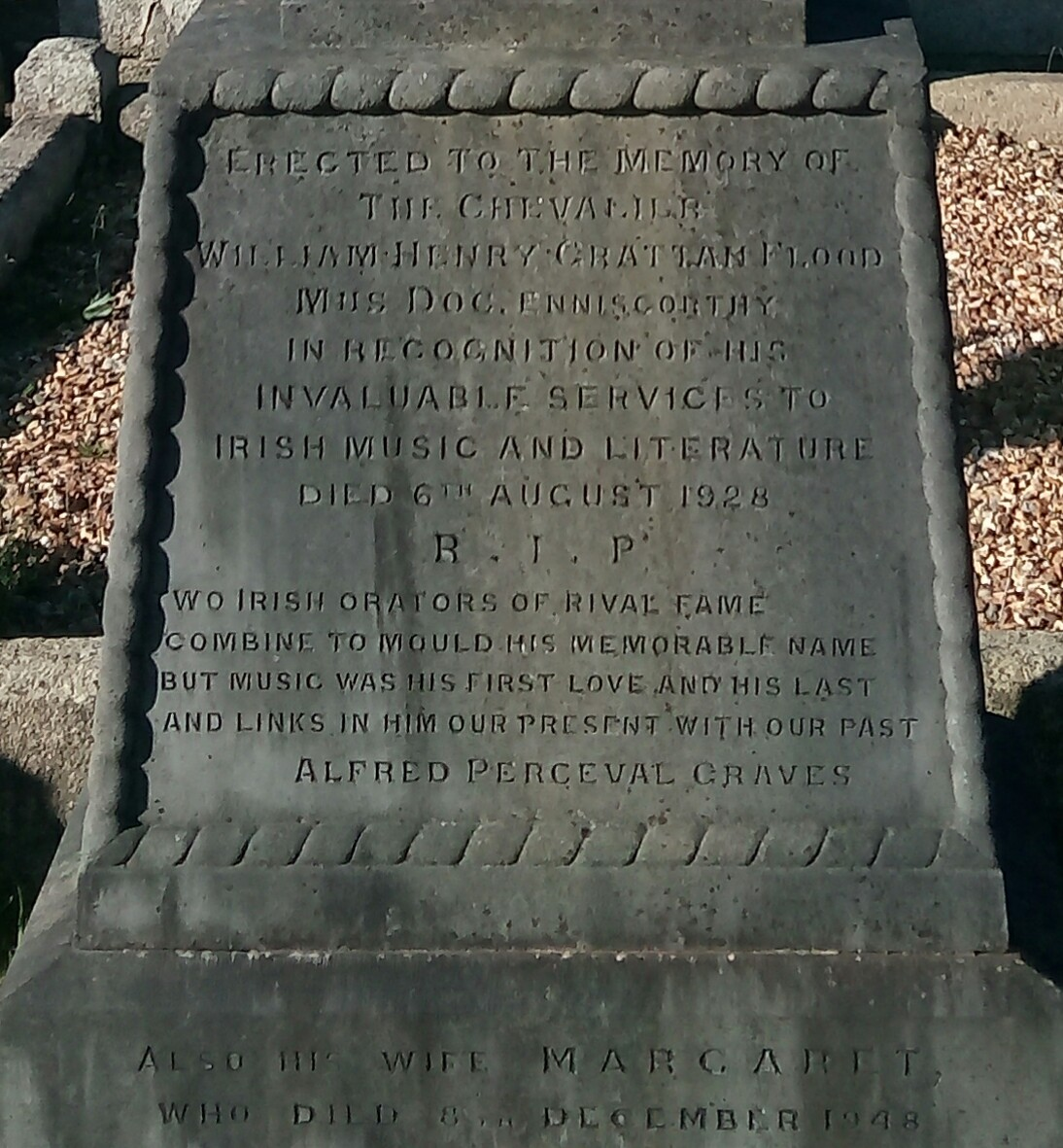
- Historical
  A memorial in the form of a limestone Celtic Cross, with a Celtic Harp carved on it was raised in Enniscorthy shortly after Chevalier Flood's death. It bears the inscription:

ERECTED TO THE MEMORY OF

CHEVALIER WILLIAM HENRY GRATTAN FLOOD, ENNISCORTHY, IN RECOGNITION OF HIS INVALUABLE SERVICES TO IRISH MUSIC AND LITERATURE. DIED AUGUST 6TH 1928. ”Irish orators of rival fame – Combine to mould his memorable name; – But music was his first love and his last –

And links in him our present with our past." — Epitaph by Alfred Perceval Graves.

== Bibliography ==
- Obituaries in The Irish Times, 7 August 1928; Irish Independent, 7 August 1928; The Irish Book Lover 17 (1928), 26.
- Flood, William Grattan: "William Henry Grattan Flood: Renowned Irish Musicologist", in: The Capuchin Annual (Dublin, 1974), pp. 56–62.
- Boydell, Barra: "Flood, W(illiam) H(enry) Grattan", in: The Encyclopaedia of Music in Ireland, ed. H. White & B. Boydell (Dublin: UCD Press, 2013), p. 394–8.
