= Colm O'Gorman =

Irish activist (born 1966)

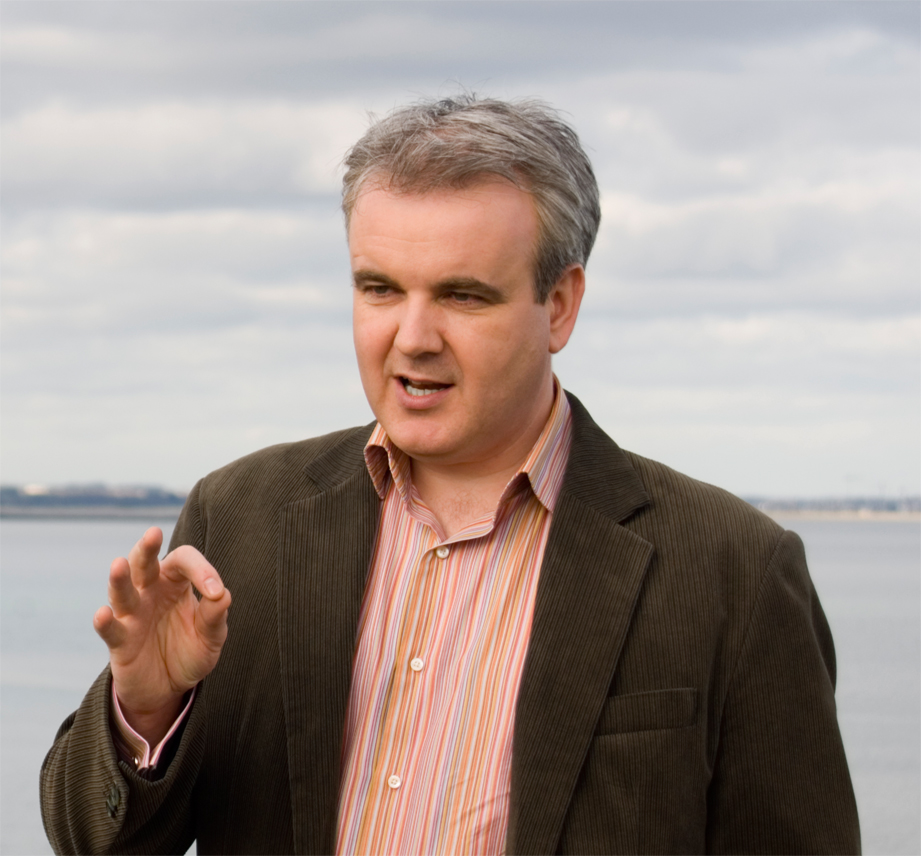

Executive Director of Amnesty International Ireland
- In office January 2008 – June 2022

Senator
- In office 3 May 2007 – 13 September 2007
- Constituency: Nominated by the Taoiseach

Personal details
- Born: 15 July 1966 (age 59) County Wexford, Ireland
- Party: Progressive Democrats (formerly)

Colm O'Gorman (born 15 July 1966) is an Irish activist and former politician. He was the executive director of Amnesty International Ireland from 2008 to 2022. He is founder and former director of One in Four.

He is a survivor of clerical sexual abuse, and first came to public attention by speaking out against the perpetrators. O'Gorman subsequently founded One in Four, an Irish charity which supports men and women who have been sexually abused and/or suffered sexual violence.

He was a Senator in 2007, representing the Progressive Democrats.

== Early and private life ==
Colm O'Gorman was born in County Wexford. His father was Seán O'Gorman, of Adamstown, County Wexford – a farmer, builder and local Fianna Fáil politician. Seán O'Gorman was a member of Wexford County Council, and later moved with his family to live in Wexford town. He twice stood unsuccessfully as a Fianna Fáil candidate in general elections: in 1969 and 1973.

In 2002, Colm O'Gorman settled near Gorey, County Wexford. He is raising two children with his husband Paul, of whom they have joint legal guardianship. When this was revealed it generated debate on fosterships in the Irish media.

== Child sexual abuse and the Roman Catholic Church ==
As an adolescent in County Wexford – between the age of 15 and 17 – O'Gorman was sexually abused by Fr Seán Fortune. The abuse occurred between 1981 and 1983. He became the first of Fortune's many victims to come forward and report the assaults to the Irish police. In 1998, he sued the Bishop of the Roman Catholic Diocese of Ferns and the Dublin Papal Nuncio, inter alia the then Pope, John Paul II, who later claimed diplomatic immunity. His case against the Catholic Diocese of Ferns was settled in 2003 with an admission of negligence and the payment of damages – in April 2003, O'Gorman was awarded €300,000 damages. O'Gorman documented his lawsuit in the BBC documentary Suing the Pope.

He successfully campaigned to set up the Ferns Inquiry, the first Irish state inquiry into clerical sexual abuse. He founded the charity One in Four in London in 1999 and established its sister organisation in Ireland in 2002. He is a well-known figure in Irish media as an advocate of child sexual abuse victims and a commentator and campaigner on sexual violence. He was named one of the ESB/Rehab People of the Year and received a TV3/Daily Star "Best of Irish" award in 2002, one of the Sunday Independent/Irish Nationwide People of the Year in 2003 and in the same year he was also awarded the James Larkin Justice Award by the Labour Party for his contribution to social justice in Ireland.

In 2006 O'Gorman presented Sex Crimes and the Vatican for the BBC Panorama documentary series, which claimed that the Vatican has used Crimen sollicitationis secret document to silence allegations of sexual abuse by priests and also claimed Crimen sollicitationis was enforced for 20 years by Cardinal Joseph Ratzinger before he became Pope Benedict XVI.

In 2020, O'Gorman was interviewed as part of the Australian documentary series Revelation.

== Political career ==
In April 2006, he announced that he would stand for the Progressive Democrats, a pro-free market liberal political party, in the 2007 general election in the Wexford constituency. On 3 May 2007, he was appointed to the Seanad by the Taoiseach to fill the vacancy caused by the death of Senator Kate Walsh.

He was not elected in the 2007 general election in Wexford polling 3% of the vote. He was not re-appointed to the 23rd Seanad in July 2007.

== Amnesty International ==
O'Gorman was the executive director of Amnesty International Ireland from 2008 to 2022, and often appears in the media to talk or write about human rights in Ireland and around the world. He and Amnesty called for an update to Ireland's hate-crime legislation, stating that freedom of expression does not extend to hate crime and that Irish people need to accept that "it is not enough to be anti-racist but that there is a need to be actively anti-racist."
