= House of Prayer, Achill =

Irish company

The House of Prayer is a limited company trading as Our Lady Queen of Peace House of Prayer (Achill) Ltd, created by an Irish woman, Christina Gallagher, in 1993. The business is based on Achill Island, County Mayo, in Ireland, with other centres in the United States. The venture has been described as "controversial" and as a "cult". It has no official status within the Catholic Church.

== Claims of visions ==
In 1985, Christina Gallagher, a housewife from Co Mayo, was with a group at Cairn's Grotto in Co Sligo, where she claims to have seen a vision of the suffering Christ's head, and subsequent visions.

Gallagher has claimed to have had visions of the Virgin Mary since 1988, to be a prophet and to suffer from stigmata on her feet. Gallagher has claimed that her mission to establish a "house of prayer" as a place where priests and laity would come to pray and worship together was made clear to her over the course of several visions of the Virgin Mary. She purchased a former convent building on Achill in 1992, and it was opened as the House of Prayer in 1993 by the then Archbishop of Tuam Joseph Cassidy. The venture secured tax exemption from the Revenue Commissioners, and built up a considerable income from voluntary donations.

== Commission of Inquiry ==
In 1996, Cassidy's successor, Archbishop Michael Neary, established a commission of enquiry to investigate claims of supernatural phenomena arising from the centre. This investigation concluded that no evidence of supernatural events existed but that the persons involved gave every evidence of good faith. After efforts by the archdiocese to "integrate" the centre into its structures, Gallagher temporarily closed the centre for a time in July 1998, since then, it has had no approval or involvement from the Catholic Church.

== Alleged miracles ==
Among claims made in 2002 of "miracle cures" were the cases of Fionnula McManus, who claimed that a baby pronounced dead in her uterus had come back to life after she visited the House of Prayer, and another, Kathleen O'Sullivan, who claimed that she was cured of pancreatic cancer.

== Charitable status revoked ==
In 2005, in the course of a crackdown on organisations purporting to pursue charitable aims, the Irish Revenue Commissioners revoked the House of Prayer's tax exemption.

In 2006 Gallagher bought her daughter a house worth €1 million in Ballina, County Mayo. It emerged in 2008 that Gallagher, despite having no visible income, was living in a €4 million house in Malahide, County Dublin and also owned a €1 million house in Newport, County Mayo.

== Comments by Archbishop Neary and Primate of All Ireland ==
In an apology printed by the Irish Mirror in 2000, the paper acknowledged that it had misrepresented Archbishop Neary in reporting that Mrs Gallagher was "banned" by the Catholic Church. Neary had stated that "Mrs Gallagher never was banned and has never been the subject of any action corresponding to that term and that Mrs Gallagher was and is a Catholic of good standing within the Church."

In March 2008, Archbishop Neary said that the centre "does not enjoy the confidence of the diocesan authorities" and "any work carried on since [July 1998] has been entirely of a private nature" and "carries no ecclesiastical approval whatever". Neary added that he respected the faith and devotion of many people who have been impressed by this (House of Prayer) work in the past. A statement issued shortly afterwards by the office of the Primate of All Ireland said that he was "involved in ongoing discussions with Fr Gerard McGinnity", a priest of the Armagh diocese who reportedly helped raise money for the centre, "regarding his involvement with the House of Prayer in Achill".

== Related groups outside Ireland ==
Funds were also raised through a "Confraternity of Our Lady Queen of Peace" run in the United States by Gallagher's associate, John Rooney. This entity established five American Houses of Prayer in Florida, Ohio, Texas, Minnesota, and Kansas, and another outside in Mexico. In 2009 the Confraternity's income was almost US$3 million, and it had assets of US$6.7 million.

In 2014, it was claimed that funding was created by scaremongering among the pilgrims by claiming that "if pilgrims did not provide money for a new House of Prayer in Texas, he would destroy the whole state." and "that will save them during the great chastisement is a €250 picture available in the House of Prayer shop".

== Dispute with donors ==
The centre was investigated by the Garda Síochána in 2008 after complaints from people who had donated money to it, and it refunded €250,000 in out of court settlements to donors. "More and more" followers were said to have become disillusioned following newspaper reports of Gallagher's lifestyle. In March 2009, the Director of Public Prosecutions decided not to take a prosecution against the House of Prayer. Sunday World journalist Jim Gallagher published a highly critical book on the House of Prayer later that year. Majella Meade, the chief fundraiser for the Achill House of Prayer, presented 100 complaints against the Sunday World to the Press Council of Ireland during 2009; all were rejected.

Archbishop Neary subsequently warned visitors to the House of Prayer to be "very careful and circumspect in going there".

== Directors resign ==
In June 2011, all three directors of the limited company resigned simultaneously, but agreed legal terms that prevented them from discussing their concerns with the media. In July 2011 the Sunday World reported that Christina Gallagher had acquired a £2 million "mansion" in Shropshire, England, using donations from her followers. Nevertheless, John Rooney, Majella Meade and other financial backers had recently broken with Gallagher.

Despite the controversies the venture generated revenues of €416,263 in 2011, 75% from donations and the remainder from sales of "religious objects". According to Darragh Mc Donagh, writing in The Times, "The company behind the House of Prayer retreat on Achill Island, Co Mayo, bought 5,000 copies of a book by its founder, Christina Gallagher, at a cost of €100,000 last year."

== Controversy ==
In October 2014, a former member asked publicly for the excommunication of Christina Gallagher. Mick Power accused Gallagher of scaremongering, simony and heresy after she and Fr McGinnity claimed that the state would be destroyed when the pilgrims did not fund a new House of Prayer in Texas. They claimed that people could be "saved" at the great chastisement by buying a €250 picture.

== See also ==
- Intercessors of the Lamb
