= Conference of Religious of Ireland =

Group of religious institutes in the Irish Catholic Church

The Conference of Religious of Ireland (CORI) is an umbrella organisation for religious institutes active in the Roman Catholic Church in Ireland. It has 138 member congregations, with a combined membership of over 9,000. It is organised in both Republic of Ireland and Northern Ireland. It was formed in 1983 as the Conference of Major Religious Superiors (CMRS) by the merger of previously separate organisations of male and female orders.

CORI's Justice commission campaigns for social justice and poverty reduction measures and produces an annual response to the Irish Government's budget. CORI has participated in the "Community Pillar" of Social Partnership negotiations in the Republic since 1996. In 1990, before the current name was adopted, Charles Haughey famously dismissed a CMRS report Must the Poor always Wait? with the quip, "I am always a bit doubtful about any organisation that has 'major' and 'superior' in its title."

In 2002 CORI negotiated a settlement with the state on behalf of 18 member congregations implicated in institutional sexual abuse, which paid €128m raised from sale of property to fund compensation claims from abuse victims. After the media revealed the terms, this settlement was criticised as too small a fraction of the total compensation required, estimated at €1.3b, and because the scheme gave anonymity to abusers. The news rather dented the group's "pure and self-righteous" image. After the 2009 publication of the report of the Commission to Inquire into Child Abuse, CORI director Seán Healy suggested the religious institutes should increase their payment to 50% of the total compensation. A further €348m was offered by 18 institutes in late 2009.

President Mary McAleese addressed delegates at a CORI conference in Malahide on 17 April 2010.

In March 2011 the CORI-sponsored National Board for Safeguarding Children in the Catholic Church in Ireland (NBSC) complained in its annual report that it could not perform a child safety audit on the Church, as the Church was denying it information, citing legal advice. Funding for its training programmes in child protection had unexpectedly ended in 2009. The NBSC is also jointly sponsored by the Irish hierarchy and the Irish Missionary Union.
