= Seán Fortune =

Irish Roman Catholic priest and sex offender

- Born: 20 December 1953; Gorey, County Wexford, Ireland
- Died: 13 March 1999 (aged 45); New Ross, County Wexford, Ireland
- Cause of death: Suicide by lethal cocktail of drugs and alcohol
- Criminal charges: Rape, sexual assault
- Penalty: None. Committed suicide while awaiting trial

Personal details
- Denomination: Catholic Church
- Occupation: Priest

Seán Fortune (20 December 1953 – 13 March 1999) was a Catholic priest from Ireland, who allegedly used his position to sexually abuse children. Fortune was accused of the rape and sexual molestation of 29 different boys. He committed suicide while awaiting trial.

== Life ==
Born on 20 December 1953 in Gorey, County Wexford, Seán Fortune was the eldest son of Elizabeth (née Acton) and James Fortune. He was educated at St Peter's College, Wexford, which was the diocesan seminary of the diocese of Ferns. It was during his training that the first reports of his abuse were made, although it is not clear whether the Diocesan authorities had knowledge of these complaints before his ordination.

Fortune ministered in the village of Fethard-on-Sea in County Wexford, in Belfast and in Dundalk. Allegations of abuse were made against him in all three places. Fortune would take groups of boys to stay over in Loftus Hall in the early 1980s when it was a convent, and allegedly carried out some of his attacks there. Sean Cloney compiled a dossier of complaints against him. He also set up a business in Dublin which offered media and journalism training to the public.

Fortune was arrested in March 1995 and charged with 22 offences, but he sought to have the charges dropped on the basis of the length of time which had elapsed. However, criminal proceedings commenced in early March 1999.

== Death and subsequent findings ==
On 13 March 1999, Fortune committed suicide in New Ross on the "eve of his trial". He had been facing 66 charges of sexual abuse against 29 boys and, while he was remanded in custody pending trial, he had been released on bail several days earlier. While at his home, he took a lethal cocktail of drugs and alcohol and was found dead in bed by his housekeeper. He was 45.

In March 2002, the BBC broadcast Suing the Pope, a documentary detailing the activities of Fortune and the response of the Diocese of Ferns to his activities over the years.

The report of the Ferns Inquiry (published in 2005) stated that two of Fortune's alleged victims had since died by suicide. While the Ferns Report noted that Fortune had been removed from some church roles owing to earlier allegations, it found that the decision to appoint him to curacies in County Wexford was "ill-advised and dangerous" and noted a "serious lack of supervision" and other failures in allowing Fortune to "open youth clubs and build reconciliation rooms for young people in the basement of his house".

== See also ==
- Roman Catholic Church sex abuse scandal
- Roman Catholic priests accused of sex offenses
- Crimen sollicitationis
- Sex Crimes and the Vatican, a BBC Panorama documentary film
- Colm O'Gorman, one of Fortune's victims
