= Mark Patrick Hederman =

Don Mark Patrick Hederman, OSB, former Abbot of Glenstal Abbey, County Limerick, Ireland, is a Benedictine monk, teacher, lecturer and writer. Formerly headmaster of the school at Glenstal, he was later named academic dean.

== Biography ==
Hederman comes from Ballingarry, the second son in a family of four. Of Glenstal, he said in 2009, "I came here as a boy to school when I was twelve years of age, and apart from about ten years of my life spent in Africa, America and other parts of Europe, I have never lived anywhere else. ... It only existed as a monastery thirty years before I arrived."

Dom Patrick earned a doctorate degree from UCD in the philosophy of education. He has lectured in philosophy and literature outside Ireland, most notably in the United States and Nigeria.

Hederman helped found the cultural journal, The Crane Bag. With Richard Kearney, he edited the two-volume collection The Crane bag book of Irish studies. (Dublin : Blackwater/Folens, 1982).

The election as fifth Abbot of Glenstal by the community of Benedictine monks, to an eight-year term, "came as a shock to those who knew him and his work because of the maverick figure that he is in the Irish Church." Also, at 64, Hederman was the oldest to be chosen for the position since the monastery became an Abbey in the 1950s.

In a piece published in early 2011, Abbot Hederman was quoted by novelist and writer Russell Shorto speaking about the sexual-abuse scandals in the Irish Catholic Church.

== Writings ==
- Anchoring the altar, published by Veritas House (2002); ISBN 1-85390-599-2, ISBN 978-1-85390-599-5
- The Haunted Inkwell: Art and Our Future (paperback), published by Columba Press (1 January 2001); ISBN 1-85607-347-5, ISBN 978-1-85607-347-9
- Underground Cathedrals, published by Columba Press (31 May 2010); ISBN 1-85607-695-4, ISBN 978-1-85607-695-1
- Walkabout: Life as Holy Spirit, published by Columba Press (20 May 2005), ISBN 1-85607-476-5; ISBN 978-1-85607-476-6
- Kissing the Dark: Connecting with the Unconscious, published by Veritas Publications (15 December 1999; 25 March 2005 as paperback); ISBN 1-85390-424-4, ISBN 978-1-85390-424-0
- Tarot: Talisman or Taboo? – Reading the World as Symbol', published by Currach Press (1 May 2003); ISBN 1-85607-902-3, ISBN 978-1-85607-902-0
- The Boy in the Bubble: Education as Personal Relationship, published by Veritas Publications (29 November 2012); ISBN 1-84730-405-2, ISBN 978-1-84730-405-6
- "The Opal and the Pearl", published by Columba Press (September 2016); 9781782183068
