= Good Shepherd Sisters: Omaha Order =

Catholic religious order

- Formation: April 4, 1894; 132 years ago
- Location: 1106 North 36th Street, Omaha, NE
- Website: goodshepherdsisters.net

The Good Shepherd Sisters of Omaha are a branch of the original Good Shepherd congregation that began in Angers, France in 1835, founded by Saint Mary Euphrasia Pelletier. Their mission is to help and educate struggling girls and women in the Omaha, Nebraska area and the surrounding states.

== History ==
The Omaha order of the Good Shepherd Sisters began in 1894 when Bishop Richard Scannell requested their services for the struggling youth in the Nebraska community. Mother Mary of St. Bernard from St. Louis, Illinois and four other sisters accepted the challenge. By the end of 1895 the order had ninety-seven girls and nine sisters, after having to turn away over one hundred other girls. Of those ninety-seven girls, twenty-eight were returned to their families or placed in the work force as reformed young women. Influential men who funded the start of the Good Shepherds in Omaha were John Rush, Edward Hayden, and John A. Creighton.

In 1897 the Good Shepherd Sisters and the city of Omaha established a “League of the Good Shepherd” to help with charitable works and providing for the troubled girls. The League consisted of anyone looking to aid the sisters: men, women, Catholic and non-Catholic.

By July 1900, the Home of the Good Shepherd had expanded to two buildings, giving the girls room for chores and sewing. Between July 1915 and March 1917 they built a permanent chapel making a cloistered order for the Sisters Magdalen possible. Magdalens were often the troubled girls that had been cared for by the Good Shepherd Sisters. Once they had stayed the minimum time at the school they chose to commit their lives to their religion and join the order. The convent for the Sisters Magdalen was finished and opened in April 1927. In 1968 the Sisters attempted to raise seven million dollars to build a youth center, but the project failed when they were unable to meet the budget. The school portion of the Omaha order was closed in 1972.

== Funding ==
When the increase of girls and women strained the budget for the Good Shepherd home, the Sisters had to find different ways to acquire money. Besides the very helpful donations from prominent men in the community, the nuns also sold the crafts they and the girls made.

In September 1895, there was a three-week-long fair in their honor held at the newly opened Creighton Theater Hall. In many articles in the Omaha World Herald, the city requested its citizens come to support the Sisters Of the good Shepherd and donate money to decrease their nine thousand dollar debt. During the fair there was nightly entertainment and musical acts. The convent also displayed and sold crafts, such as sewing, needlework, featherstitching, and drawings. Once the fair ended in the second week of October, the sisters had raised over five thousand dollars and the fair proved to be a great success.

== Role in the Community ==
The sisters in the Omaha order of the Good Shepherd Sisters are trained in many fields after finishing their religious training. Those positions include: teacher, nurse, group mother, psychologist, social worker, home economist, and directress of girls. Throughout their time in the community they assisted many struggling girls that were not only taken in from the eastern Nebraska region, but also from other states. Cities such as Davenport, Iowa chose to send at risk girls from questionable upbringings to the Good Shepherd Sisters in Omaha. This was the preferred form of reformation, as opposed to a correctional institution. According to 1878 Iowa state legislation, the court system could place young girls (and boys) in “homes of the friendless”, such as Omaha’s Good Shepherd homes, if they were orphaned, in danger, or had the potential to lead an immoral life. The city of Davenport frequently sent distressed girls to Omaha because they feared the inflation of prostitution if the girls were left to fend for themselves.

Approximately 85 to 90 percent of all girls attending the Good Shepherd home were successful later in life as respectable, hard working women.

After the closing of the school, the sisters continued to work in the community counseling and caring for abused women and distressed families, distributing food to the hungry and praying for the poor, sick and dispossessed.

Recently they have designated much effort to mercy housing for Sudanese refugees in the Omaha area.

== Core Values ==
- Mercy
- Reconciliation
- Individual Worth
- Zeal

== Former Locations ==
- 40th and Jones Streets, Omaha, NE
- 37th and M. Streets, Omaha, NE
- 653 S. 40th Street, Omaha, NE
- 29th and Hamilton Streets, Omaha, NE
- 3321 Fontenelle Blvd., Omaha, NE

== Current Location ==
• 1106 North 36th Street, Omaha, NE
