= Ferns Report =

Report in the Irish government inquiry into clerical sexual abuse allegations

The Ferns Report (2005) was an official Irish government inquiry into the allegations of clerical sexual abuse in the Roman Catholic Diocese of Ferns in County Wexford, Ireland.

== Scope ==
The Inquiry was set up by the Government of Ireland to identify complaints and allegations made against clergy of the Diocese of Ferns prior to April 2002, and to report upon the response of Church and Civil Authorities. The Inquiry did not concern itself with the truth or otherwise of the complaints and allegations made, but entirely with the response to those allegations. The Inquiry recorded its revulsion at the extent, severity and duration of the child sexual abuse allegedly perpetrated on children by priests acting under the aegis of the Diocese of Ferns. The investigation was established in the wake of the broadcast of a BBC Television documentary Suing the Pope, which highlighted the case of Fr Seán Fortune, one of the most notorious clerical sexual offenders. The film followed Colm O'Gorman as he investigated the story of how Fortune was allowed to abuse him and countless other teenage boys. O'Gorman, through One in Four, the organisation he founded to support women and men who have experienced sexual violence, successfully campaigned for the Ferns Inquiry.

The Ferns Report was presented to the Irish government on 25 October 2005 and released the following day. It identified more than 100 allegations of child sexual abuse made between 1962 and 2002 against twenty-one priests operating under the aegis of the Diocese of Ferns. Eleven of these individuals were alive in 2002. The nature of the response by the Church authorities in the Diocese of Ferns to allegations of child sexual abuse by priests operating under the aegis of the diocese had varied over the forty years to 2002.

== Findings ==
Among the facts revealed were:

- The failure of Bishop Donal Herlihy to exclude clearly unsuitable candidates from the priesthood and his failure to ensure that alleged abusers were kept away from children;
- His failure to report incidents of alleged sexual abuse to the legal authorities
- The failure of his successor, Brendan Comiskey, to report incidents of abuse and his failure to establish sound child protection measures; From 1990 onward he reported all allegations made by children to the authorities.
- The adoption of strict policies of immediate removal of any clergy subject to allegations by his successor, Bishop Eamon Walsh.
- Police failure to properly investigate sexual abuse complaints prior to 1990.

Among the allegations made were:

- The sexual touching of teenage girls near the altar of a church by one priest;
- The use of blackmail by another priest to force children to perform sex acts on him;
- Most allegations did not involve rape, but a range of sexual assaults from inappropriate touching to masturbation.

Multiple allegations of abuse were made against the following priests (those still alive have not been identified in the Ferns Report):

- Fr Donal Collins, transferred from St Peter's College in Wexford to London in 1966 but returned to the college in 1968
- Fr James Doyle, ordination postponed in 1973, after the first allegation of drunken assault, but Doyle was ordained one year later.

These three are deceased:

- Fr James Grennan, sexually molested girls in Monageer church, County Wexford while he heard confession
- Canon Martin Clancy, molested his female victim in her own home
- Fr Seán Fortune ministered in the village of Poulfour in Co. Wexford, in Belfast and in Dundalk. Allegations of abuse were made against him in all three places.

=== Bishop Comiskey ===
The Inquiry contacted the mother of a young woman who said that Bishop Éamonn Walsh who, as Apostolic Administrator, assumed control of the Ferns Diocese (following Comiskey's resignation) became aware of an allegation early in 2004. He called to see her daughter and urged her to make a formal statement, which she did. Walsh reported the matter to the Metropolitan for the Diocese of Ferns, Desmond Connell, Cardinal Archbishop of Dublin. A report on the matter was prepared for the Vatican. Comiskey was not interviewed during the preparation of this report. The report concluded that a delict had not been committed as regards the behaviour alleged but the fact that, under the influence of alcohol, Comiskey was alleged to have acted in such a manner was something that needed to be addressed to ensure that no repetition of such behaviour could take place.

The Inquiry was informed by Comiskey that, although he agreed to step aside from active ministry when this allegation was first made known to church authorities, he had returned to ministry but agreed to refrain from high-profile acts of ministry. As of 2007, he is residing in Inniskeen, County Monaghan.

=== Micheál Ledwith ===
Comiskey nominated his diocesan colleague, Monsignor Micheál Ledwith to be president of St. Patrick's College, Maynooth in 1984 despite the prior concerns of six seminarians about Ledwith's alleged homosexual orientation. Later allegations of sexual abuse of a minor became known after Ledwith resigned as president in 1994; he was defrocked by the Church 11 years afterwards.

=== Jim Grennan ===
This was also seen in other cases, such as that of Jim Grennan, a parish priest, who abused children as they prepared for First Communion, and Sean Fortune, who committed suicide before his trial for the rape of children.

== Judgement and recommendation ==
Between 1960 and 1980, the Report found that Bishop Herlihy treated child sexual abuse by priests of his diocese exclusively as a moral problem. He transferred priests against whom allegations had been made, to a different post or a different diocese for a period of time but then returned them to their former position.

By 1980, Bishop Herlihy recognised that there was a psychological or medical dimension to the issue of child sexual abuse. Some priests in respect of whom allegations had been made were sent to a psychologist.

However, decisions were made by Bishop Herlihy to appoint to curacies priests against whom allegations had been made, in respect of whom a respected clerical psychologist had expressed his concerns in unambiguous terms as to their suitability to interact with young people.

The report was also highly critical of the failure of the Garda Síochána (police) to properly investigate reported incidents. It noted with concern the disappearance of one police file detailing serious incidents of clerical sex abuse. It stated that the local health authorities failed to protect children even when aware of allegations.

As a result of a late application, a further inspection of files from July 2005 revealed a further five cases of concern, which were mentioned in the report's appendix. This raised concern about the diocese's willingness to disclose relevant files.

== Process and publication of the Report ==
An initial report was made to the government in 2002 by George Bermingham SC. A non-statutory private inquiry was then established in March 2003 by Micheál Martin as Minister for Health and Children, comprising three persons: Francis Murphy, a retired Supreme Court Judge; Dr Helen Buckley, a sociology lecturer at Trinity College Dublin; and Dr Laraine Joyce of the office of health management, a part of the Ministry for Health and Children.

The report was published in October 2005, noting the anonymity of victims and alleged abusers, and highlighting that in the Ministry's opinion: "no evidence was placed before the Inquiry suggesting the operation or the organisation of a paedophile ring in the Diocese of Ferns or any clerical institution within that Diocese." The report cost just under €1.9 million.

The Report was considered to be more robust that the Church's own McCullough Report, released earlier in 2005, which covered one aspect concerning allegations about Michael Ledwith. The main Dáil debate on the Ferns Report was in two parts on 9 November 2005. The Irish Senate debate started on 10 November.

== Press comment ==
According to reports in the Irish press, the report itself was not to be published on the Internet for legal reasons. A document claimed to be the text of the Report is, however, online, on the website of an organisation called BishopAccountability.org., and also on the website of an organisation called oneinfour.org.

== See also ==
- Child sexual abuse
- Religious abuse
- Catholic Church sexual abuse cases in Ireland
- Brendan Comiskey ss cc, former Bishop of Ferns
- Seán Fortune
- Catholic Church sexual abuse cases
- Crimen sollicitationis
- Deliver Us from Evil
- Sex Crimes and the Vatican (Panorama documentary episode)
