= Donal Herlihy =

Irish Roman Catholic clergyman

Donal Herlihy (1908–1983) was an Irish Roman Catholic clergyman who served as the bishop of Roman Catholic Diocese of Ferns from 1964 to 1983.

He was born in Knocknagree, County Cork (within the jurisdiction of Kerry diocese) in 1908 and studied at St. Brendan's College, Killarney.

On 6 February 1921, when aged 12, Herlihy was wounded by gunfire along with his brother while playing a game of hurling. The incident left another participant dead and was seen as a retaliatory action by the Royal Irish Constabulary and the Black and Tans following the Tureengariffe Ambush on 29 January, in which a number of British soldiers were killed or injured.

He studied for the priesthood in Rome was ordained priest there in 1931. Further studies in scripture led to him being appointed Professor of Sacred Scripture in All Hallows College, Dublin.

In 1947 he returned to Rome and the Pontifical Irish College as vice rector, becoming rector in 1951. In 1964 it was announced he would become Bishop of Ferns, and he was consecrated bishop in the Basilica of St John Lateran on 16 November 1964, the principal consecrator being Cardinal Confalonieri.

== Episcopal ministry ==
Herlihy's time as bishop is now seen primarily through the lens of the Ferns Report into child sexual abuse in his diocese. An insight into Herlihy's character is given in a review of the report by the author Colm Toibin "He had spent many years in Rome and was rather disappointed to be returned to an Irish backwater. It was said of him that he would have made a very great bishop if only he had believed in God." Toibin goes on to reflect on the gap between Herlihy's experience in Rome and his suitability as a bishop in rural Wexford; "His sermons in Enniscorthy Cathedral were lofty in tone and content. He loved Catullus and Ovid and Horace and he could not refrain from quoting them to a bewildered congregation. I once sat through a long sermon on the small matter of the 'lacrimae rerum'."

As Bishop he came in for fierce criticism in the Ferns Report which said he repeatedly placed priests whom he knew to be paedophiles in parishes where access to young people was easily available. One writer described Herlihy's manner in Wexford town as "regally unapproachable"

It is now known that in 1966, at the start of his episcopal ministry, Herlihy assessed allegations of sexual behaviour towards boys in a dormitory of St Peter's College, Wexford by Donal Collins as a 'moral failure.' Collins was sent away for two years and then permitted to return to the school becoming head of the college in 1988.

He died 2 April 1983 and is buried in Enniscorthy.
