= Eugene Greene =

Irish Catholic priest and convicted child abuser

Eugene Greene was a Catholic priest in the Raphoe diocese of the County Donegal, Ireland. In 1999, he was arrested for abusing 26 boys between 1965 and 1992. In 2000, Greene was sentenced to 12 years in prison, of which he only served nine. He was released in 2008.

== Career ==
From 1965 to 1975, Greene served with the Kiltegan Fathers in Nigeria. After returning to Ireland in 1975, he was a curate in Gweedore. Following this, he served in Killybegs, Lettermacaward, Gortahork, Glenties, Kilmacrennan and Annagry. In Gortahork, he sexually abused 16 boys between 1976 and 1981.

In December 1997, Greene went to the Irish police to report that he was being blackmailed by a man he had previously abused. After investigating Greene's claims, the police laid charges on Greene for past sexual abuse of young boys.

In April 2000, Greene pleaded guilty to a set of forty sample charges issued by government prosecutors for abusing 26 boys between 1965 and 1982. He was sentenced to twelve years in prison. He was released in 2008 after serving nine years.

Greene died at the end of 2018.

== See also ==
- Sexual abuse scandal in Raphoe diocese
