= St. Aidan's Cathedral =

- Ardeaglais Naomh Aodháin
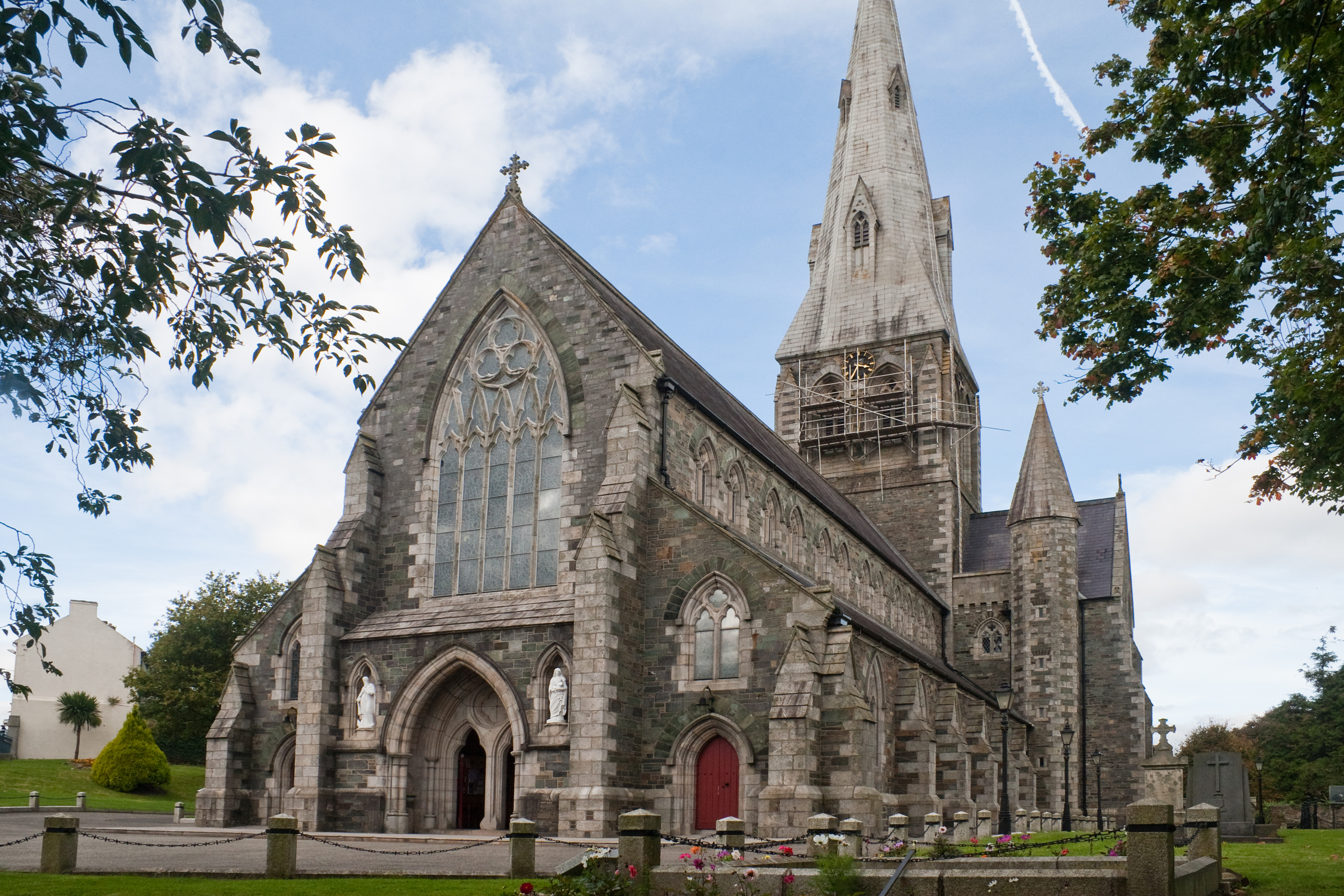

- Location in Ireland
- 52°30′08″N 6°34′15″W
- Location: Enniscorthy, County Wexford, Ireland
- Denomination: Roman Catholic

History
- Status: Cathedral
- Consecrated: 1860

Architecture
- Style: Gothic revival
- Years built: 1843–1885
- Groundbreaking: 1843
- Completed: 1885

Administration
- Province: Dublin
- Diocese: Ferns
- Parish: Cathedral

St. Aidan's Cathedral (Irish: Ardeaglais Naomh Aodháin) is the cathedral church of the Roman Catholic Diocese of Ferns. It is located in Enniscorthy, County Wexford, in Ireland. The saint to whom the cathedral is dedicated is Máedóc of Ferns (feast day 31 January), also known as Áedan or Aidan, who died in 626, and not to be confused with St. Aidan of Lindisfarne (feast day 31 August), an Irish missionary who died in 651.

== History ==
With the completion of the old Cathedral in 1809, Enniscorthy becomes the Episcopal Centre of the Diocese of Ferns. Eventually, the building proved in need of repair and inadequate for the needs of the diocese. A new cathedral, designed by Augustus Welby Pugin, reputedly based on Tintern Abbey in Wales, was built in 1843. It was the largest church Pugin had designed in Ireland.

It was constructed in dressed local stone, including stone salvaged from a nearby ruined Franciscan Friary.

Notable features include the façade, a reredos carved from Caen stone and a great north window with intricate stone tracery. The cathedral was subsequently much renovated in line with reforms promulgated by the Second Vatican Council. It was restored to its near original design in 1994 when authentic colours, materials and techniques were used to include painted arches, dark blue ceiling above white walls. The restoration took a year, during which time cathedral services were held at St Mary's church (Church of Ireland) nearby.

The cathedral is similar in structure to St Mary's Cathedral, Killarney.

== Gallery ==
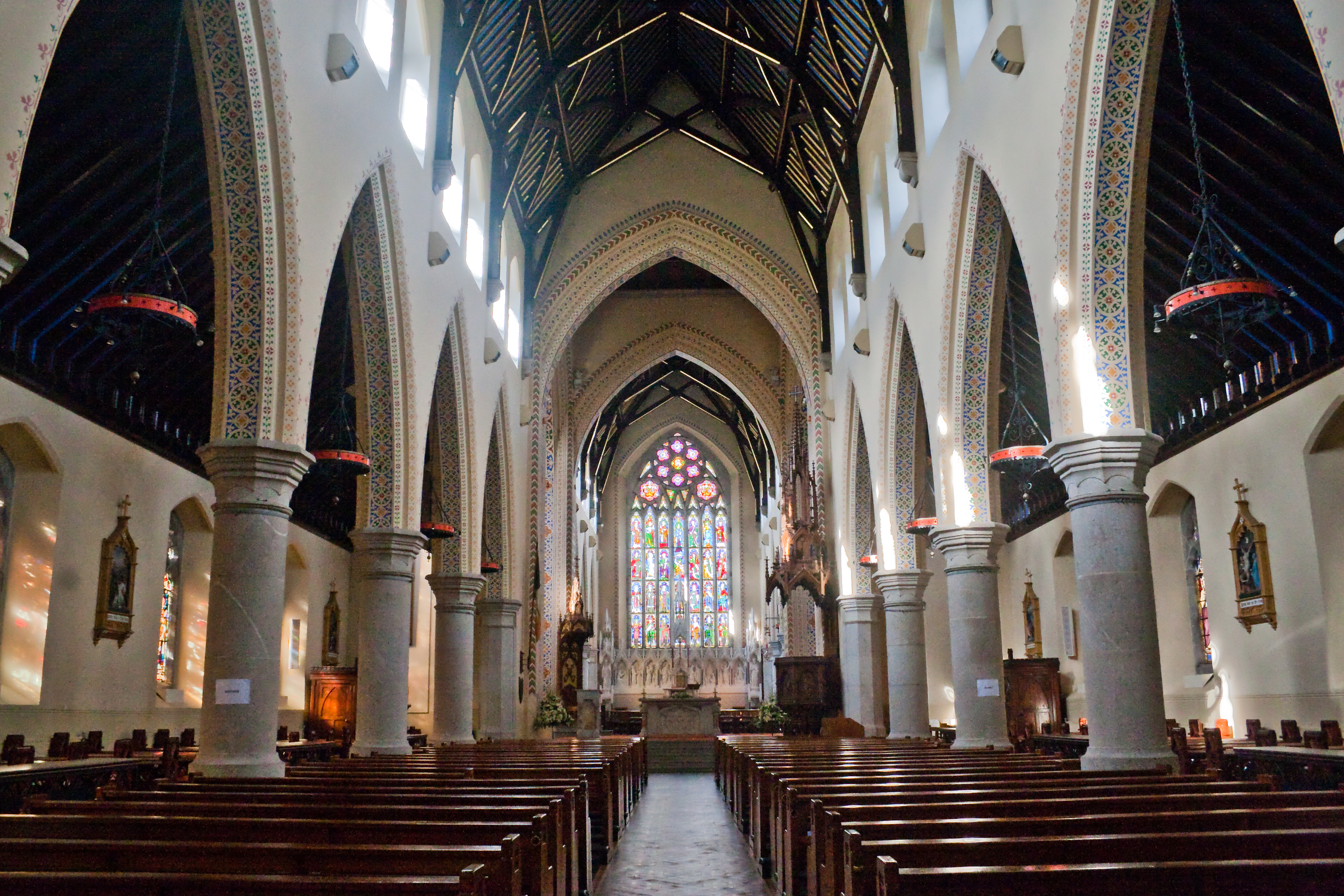
Cathedral nave

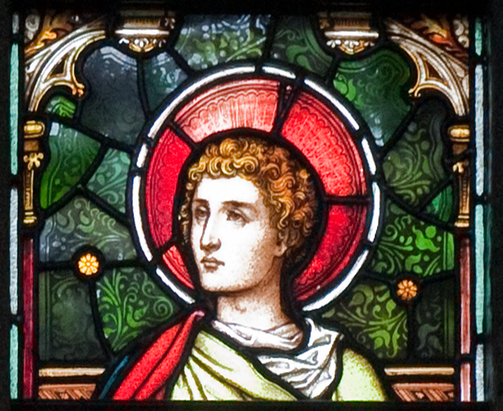
Stained glass of John the Evangelist

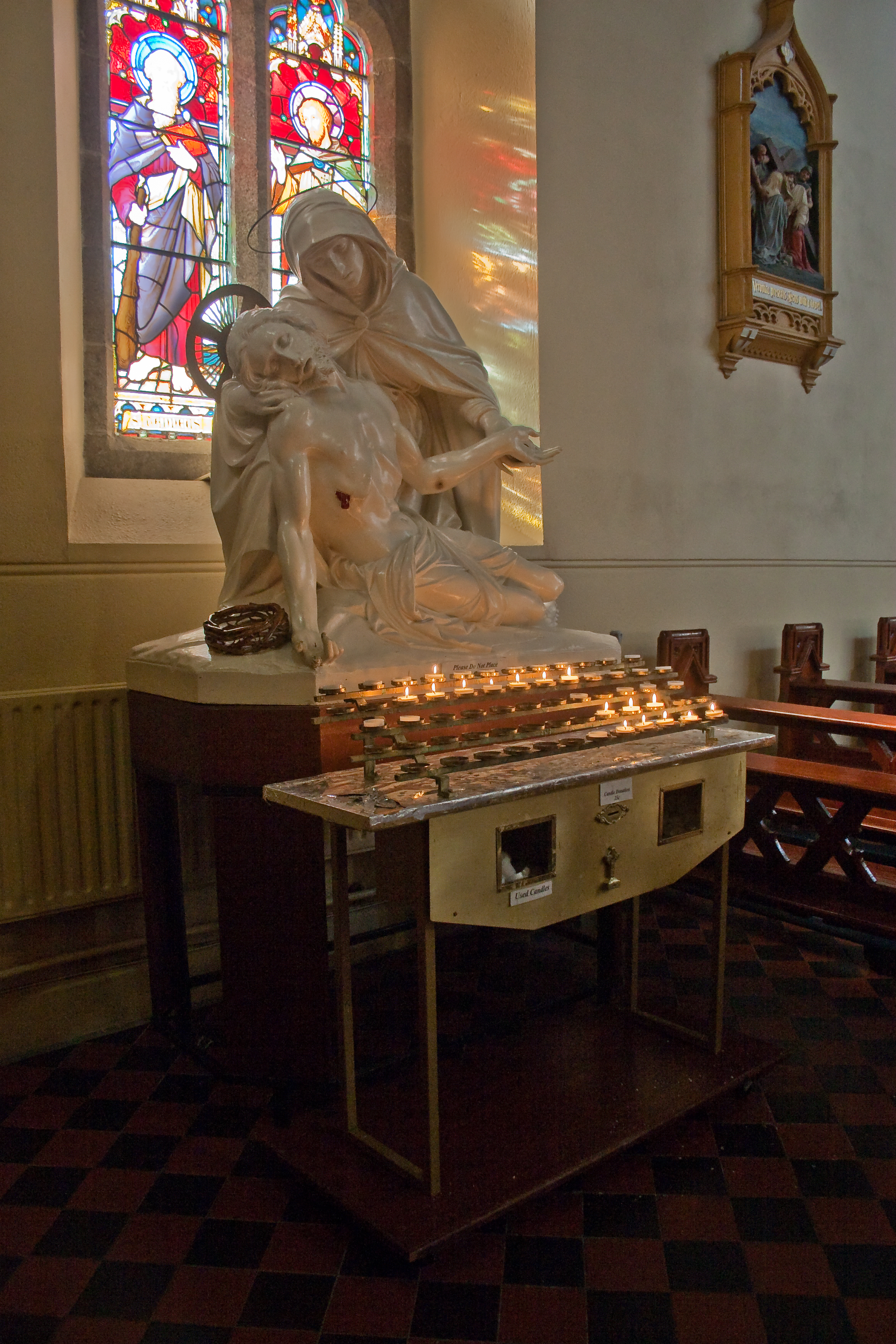
Pietà statue

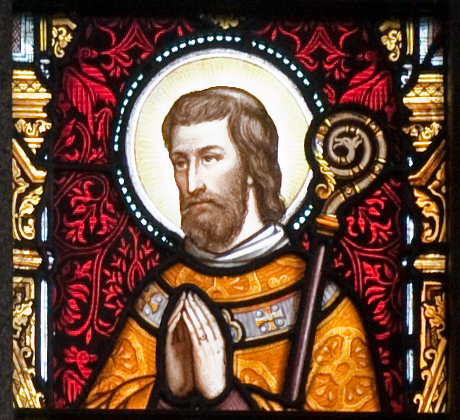
Stained Glass of St. Máedóc of Ferns (Aidan)
