= Brendan Comiskey =

Irish Roman Catholic bishop (1935–2025)

His Lordship The Most Rev. Brendan Comiskey
- Bishop of Ferns
- Archdiocese: Dublin
- Diocese: Ferns
- Appointed: 4 April 1984
- Term ended: 6 April 2002
- Predecessor: Donal Herlihy
- Successor: Denis Brennan
- Previous posts: Auxiliary Bishop of Dublin and Titular Bishop of Thibilis (1979–1984)

Orders
- Ordination: 25 June 1961
- Consecration: 20 January 1980 by Dermot Ryan

Personal details
- Born: 13 August 1935 Tassan, Ireland
- Died: 28 April 2025 (aged 89) Dundalk, Ireland

The Most Rev. Brendan Oliver Comiskey (13 August 1935 – 28 April 2025) was a Catholic clergyman who served as Bishop of Ferns from 1982 to 2002. Comiskey resigned on 1 April 2002, over charges that he had failed to deal adequately with allegations that Seán Fortune and others were sexually abusing children.

== Early life ==
He was born in Clontibret, County Monaghan, Ireland, and received his secondary schooling at St Macartan's College.

== Early ministry ==
Comiskey's early clerical career was extremely promising. He was head of his order in Ireland and the UK by the age of 34, became an auxiliary bishop in the Roman Catholic Archdiocese of Dublin at age 45 and soon thereafter was appointed to the Diocese of Ferns at the age of 47.

== Diocese of Ferns and clerical sexual abuse ==
Brendan Comiskey succeeded Donal Herlihy as Bishop of Ferns in 1984.

As a result of The Ferns Report, published by the Irish Government on 25 October 2005 into child sex abuse in this diocese (between 1962 and 2002), the wider Irish public became aware of a catalogue of abuse going back to Herlihy's tenure on office involving 100 individual cases involving 21 priests.

Also, but independently in 2005, it was reported that Comiskey had lobbied hard for the controversial- and ultimately defrocked - priest of his diocese Miceal Ledwith to be appointed President of Maynooth College. Comiskey told a review into Ledwith's activity at the seminary that he "had a very high regard for Mgr Ledwith and subsequently made a very strong speech in his support when nominating him for the position of President of Maynooth College."

== Resignation ==
Comiskey resigned in 2002 after the transmission of the BBC documentary Suing the Pope, amid allegations that he did not report allegations that Sean Fortune had abused a number of children while Comiskey was in control of the diocese. Fortune was a serial paedophile with a manipulative personality and Comiskey admitted he found him difficult to deal with. Fortune committed suicide while on bail.

According to the founder of the abuse victims' charity One in Four, Colm O'Gorman, Comiskey was not alone in his responsibility to report the allegations to civil authorities. O'Gorman is quoted as saying, "It would be sad if he (Comiskey) was ultimately scapegoated in all this and the church failed to accept full responsibility".

Éamonn Walsh was installed in March 2002 as Apostolic Administrator in Ferns and implemented a new child protection policy which resulted in many more historic allegations of child-sexual abuse emerging.

In 2014, Comiskey "broke his silence" on the child abuse scandal in Ireland, claiming that he had done his best and "that he was deeply sorry for all that had happened." In 2016, his name still appeared on the website of his congregation where he was said to be a retreat giver whose conferences are "filled with profound content mixed with wit and humour."

== Personal life and death ==
Comiskey was open about his struggles with alcoholism from the 1990s onward; he regularly attended Alcoholics Anonymous meetings.

Comiskey died on 28 April 2025, aged 89.

== See also ==
- Roman Catholic Church sex abuse scandal
- Roman Catholic priests accused of sex offenses
- Crimen sollicitationis

Catholic Church titles
Preceded by Donal Herlihy	Bishop of Ferns; 1984–2002	Succeeded by Denis Brennan
Preceded by Bernard Panafieu	Titular Bishop of Thibilis; 1979–1984	Succeeded by Jorge Medina
Preceded by —	Auxiliary Bishop of Dublin; 1979–1984	Succeeded by —
