= Diocese of Ferns (Catholic) =

Latin Catholic diocese in Ireland

Diocese of Ferns Dioecesis Fernensis Deoise Fearna

Catholic
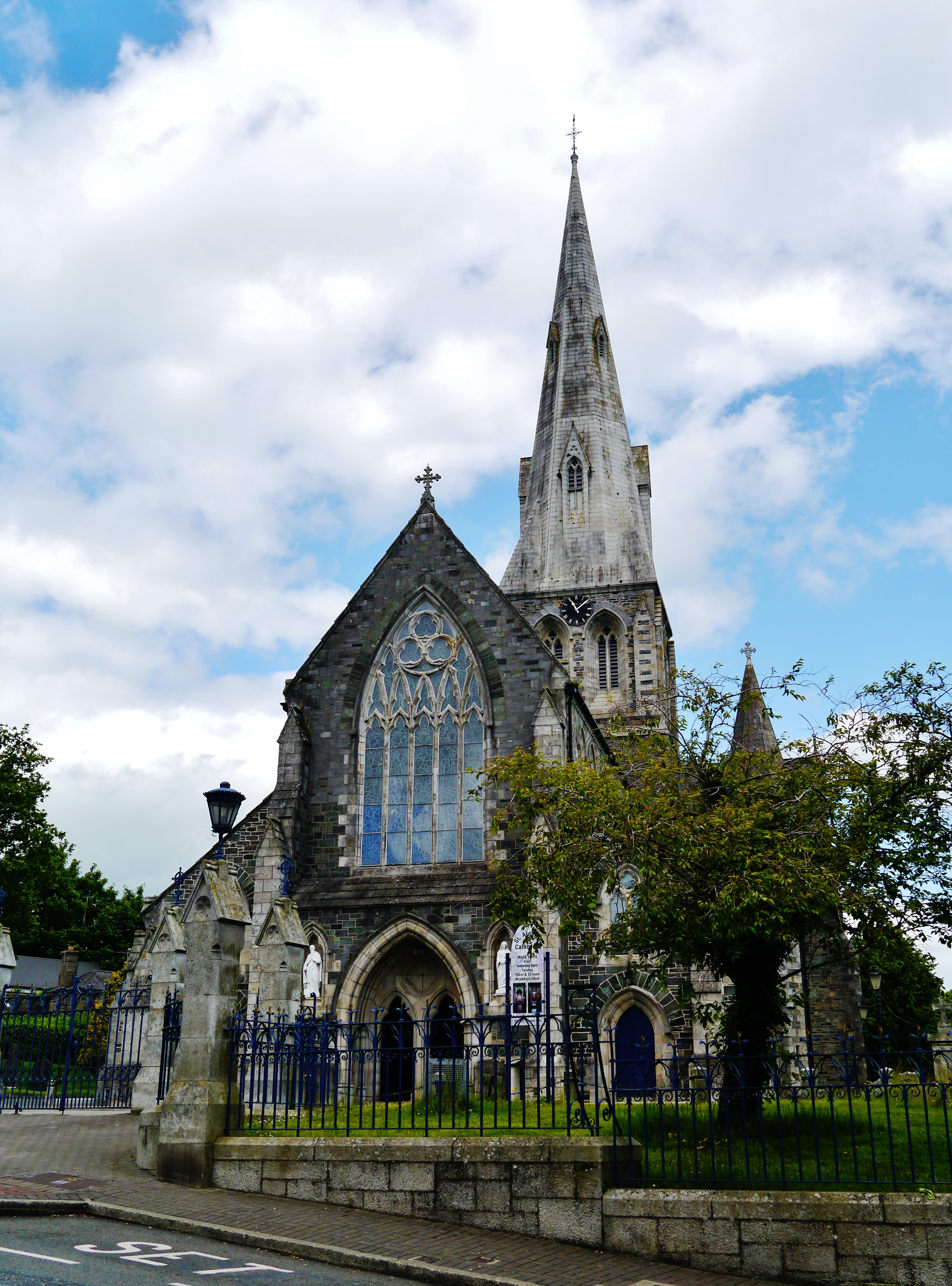
- Saint Aidan's Cathedral, Enniscorthy

Location
- Country: Ireland
- Territory: Most of County Wexford and parts of County Wicklow
- Ecclesiastical province: Province of Dublin
- Metropolitan: Archdiocese of Dublin

Statistics
- Area: 1,158 sq mi (3,000 km^{2})
- Population: Total; Catholics: (as of 2019); 126,277; 100,679 (79.7%)

Information
- Denomination: Catholic
- Sui iuris church: Latin Church
- Rite: Roman Rite
- Established: 7th Century
- Cathedral: St Aidan's Cathedral, Enniscorthy
- Patron saint: St Aidan

Current leadership
- Pope: Leo XIV
- Bishop: Most Rev. Dr. Gerard Nash D.D, Bishop of Ferns
- Metropolitan Archbishop: Dermot Farrell, Archbishop of Dublin
- Vicar General: Very Rev. Fr. Brian Broaders P.P V.G Very Rev. Fr. Sean Devereux P.P V.F (Dean), Very Rev. Denis Kelly P.P V.F (Dean), Very Rev. Aodhan Marken P.P V.F (Dean), Very Rev. Roger O’ Neill P.P V.F (Dean)
- Bishops emeritus: Denis Brennan

Map
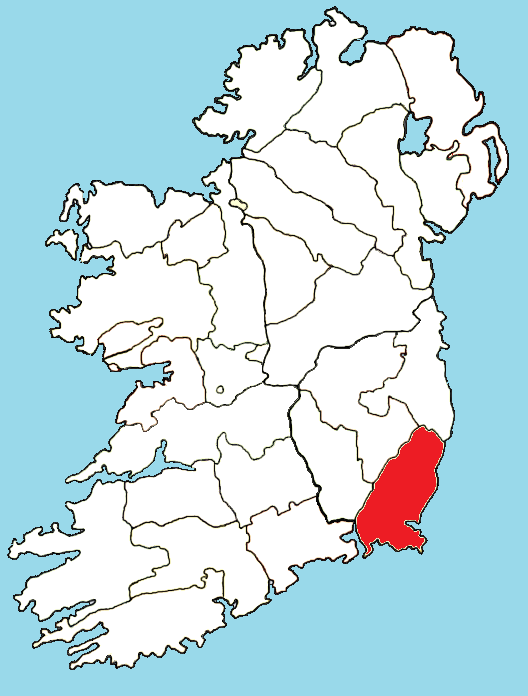

Website
- ferns.ie

The Diocese of Ferns (Irish: Deoise Fhearna) is a Latin Church diocese of the Catholic Church in south-eastern Ireland. It is one of three suffragan dioceses in the ecclesiastical province of Dublin and is subject to the Archdiocese of Dublin. The incumbent Ordinary is Gerard Nash.

== Geographical remit ==
The See covers most of County Wexford and some of County Carlow and County Wicklow. The major towns are Enniscorthy, Gorey, New Ross and Wexford, along with its namesake town of Ferns.

It is a suffragan of the Archdiocese of Dublin.

== History ==
W. H. Grattan Flood, author of the History of the Diocese of Ferns, illustrates the origin of the Diocese, by stating:

It is a far cry back to the year 598, when the See of Ferns was established, with St. Aedan (Mo-Aedh-og or Mogue) as first Bishop. During his episcopate thirty churches and numerous monasteries were founded. St. Ibar, St. Abban, St. Brendan, and St. Senan were also early labourers in the diocese. St. Aedan died on January 31, 630, leaving a fragrant memory behind him, and his episcopal See was known as Fearna-mor-Moedhoc."

== Ordinaries ==
The following is a list of the most recent post-Reformation Catholic bishops and vicars apostolic.

- Thomas Furlong (1857–1875)
- Michael Warren (1876–1884)
- James Browne (1884–1917)
- William Codd (1917–1938)
- James Staunton (1938–1963)
- Donal Herlihy (1964–1983)
- Brendan Oliver Comiskey, SS.CC. (1984–2002)
- Denis Brennan (2006–2021)
- Gerard Nash (2021–present)

== Sex abuse controversy ==
The October 2005 Report of the Ferns Inquiry has outlined the serious levels of clerical sex abuse in the diocese since 1962. It strongly criticised the former bishops of Ferns, Donal Herlihy and Brendan Comiskey for their inability to deal with the allegations of sexual abuse made against a number of priests. Comiskey resigned as Bishop on 1 April 2002.

== See also ==
- St. Aidan's Cathedral
- Catholic Church in Ireland

== Sources ==
- Grattan Flood, W.H. History of the Diocese of Ferns. Waterford: Downey & Co., 1916.
