= Waterford Suir Valley Railway =

Heritage railway, County Waterford, Ireland

- Terminus: Kilmeaden

Commercial operations
- Built by: Originally part of the Waterford, Dungarvan and Lismore Railway
- Original gauge: 5 ft 3 in (1,600 mm)

Preserved operations
- Length: 10 km
- Preserved gauge: 3ft

Preservation history
- 2000: First lengths of 3 ft gauge track laid
- 2003: First public trains run
- Headquarters: Kilmeaden, Co Waterford

Website
- www.wsvrailway.ie

Waterford Suir Valley Railway (WSVR) is a registered charity operating on a 3 ft (914 mm) gauge railway track from Kilmeadan back towards Bilberry outside Waterford, Ireland.The line shares much of its route along the banks of River Suir with the Waterford Greenway. This walking and cycle path passes through the station which has car parking and a coffee shop for visitors.

Apart from the station platforms, there are two other halts, built in 2017, at Mount Congreve and Bilberry on the outskirts of Waterford. The railway currently only uses diesel locomotives though efforts are underway to restore a steam locomotive to full operating capacity to run on the line. In addition to regular scheduled services, the railway also operates a 'Santa Express' service. Some of the carriages are wheelchair accessible.

== History ==
The society was established in 1997 with the intention of restoring the Waterford and Tramore Railway, but after feasibility studies this was deemed impractical due to changes in road layouts made since the line's closure. The Waterford - Dungarvan rail route was then explored and agreement was reached to try to restore a section of the historic line which was integral in connecting travelers from London to Killarney made popular as a holiday destination by Queen Victoria and was the first line to have luxury dining cars in Ireland. This line also carried mail from the UK and Ireland to the Americas via Cobh.

The society laid its first track in 2000 and by the end of 2003 it had laid over 8 km of track from Kilmeaden to Gracedieu Junction. It ran its first public trains in May that year.

In 2004, a further 2 km of track were laid as far as Bilberry. In 2008, the railway carried its 100,000th passenger, and in 2010 opened a maintenance and storage shed for its rolling stock. In 2016, the WSVR received planning permission for a new station building at Kilmeaden.

In March 2017, the Waterford Greenway opened on the 46 km of track bed built for the Waterford to Dungarvan rail line with walkers and cyclists sharing much of the last 10 km with the heritage railway as it heads towards Waterford City. Kilmeaden station is a meeting point with users of the Greenway and visitors to the railway availing of the station's facilities.

The railway is a registered charity, with a voluntary board of directors, with the purpose of preserving a part of Waterford's industrial heritage and educating visitors on its history. In 2016, the railway carried over 24,000 passengers and by 2018 this number had risen to just under 30,000. The Whistlestop Cafe and facilities were completed in 2020, partly funded by the 'Dormant Accounts Fund'. It is one of the last rest points with facilities between Kilmeaden and Waterford City.

== Route ==
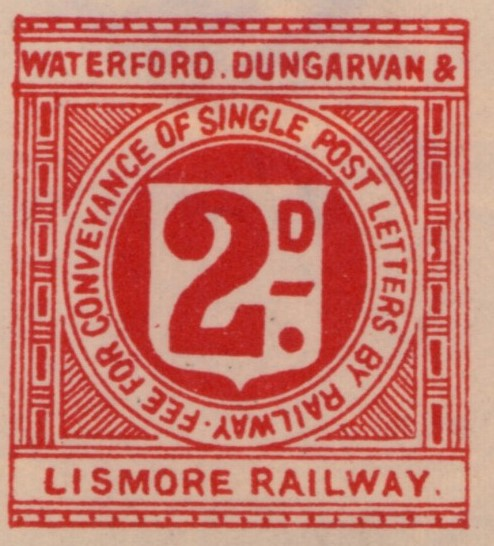
Railway postage stamp

The route is on the track bed of the former 5 ft 3 in (1,600 mm) gauge Waterford, Dungarvan & Lismore Railway, which was opened in 1878 and closed in 1967 when under the ownership of CIE, though a section remained open until 1987 for magnesite ore processing at the Quigley Plant in Ballinacourty. This plant closed in 1982 though occasional weed spraying trains ran on the line up until May 1990. The WSVR uses the original railway station at Kilmeaden however the original goods yard is now a private dwelling.

The Dan Donovan Tunnel under the Waterford Bypass was specifically built to facilitate the line's continued operation towards Waterford City when the line's route had to be modified to accommodate the new motorway. The long term goal remains to facilitate space to "link Waterford Suir Valley Railway into the city centre over the long term".

Though the line extends as far as a new platform at Bilberry just to the east of Waterford City, scheduled trains mostly run as far as Gracedieu Junction before turning back. Pre-booked trains do run the full length of the line to accommodate groups arriving by coach at the Bilberry coach and car park and the railway can be contacted to make such arrangements. Apart from the passing loop in Kilmeaden, the line is single track for the length of the route though a second passing loop is being planned by the Lime Kilns at Killoteran near Mount Congreve.

== Rolling stock and infrastructure ==
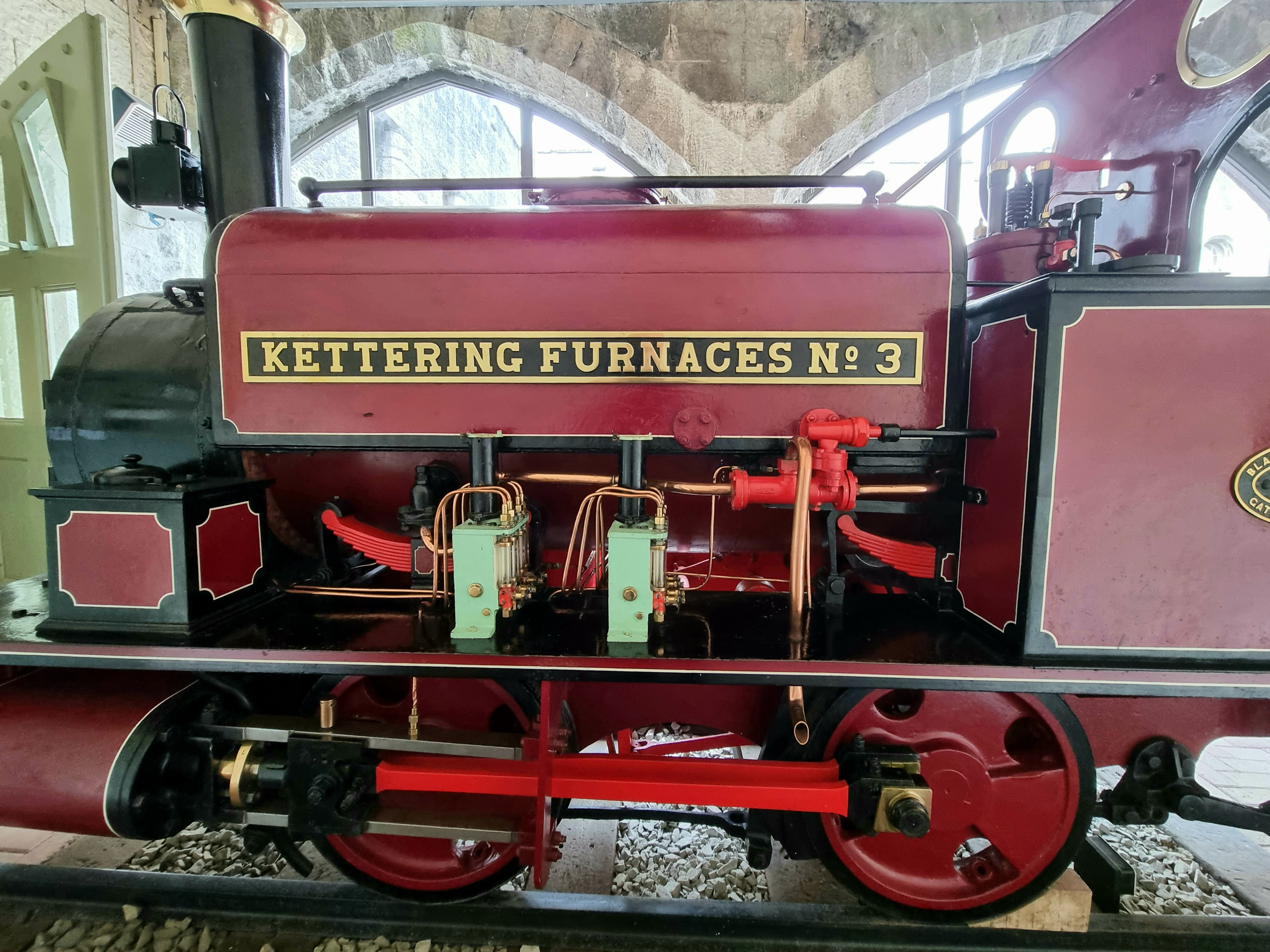
Kettering Furnaces No. 3

In January 2024, The National Trust gifted 0-4-0ST steam locomotive "Kettering Furnaces No.3" to the charity. The locomotive was built in 1885 by Black, Hawthorn and spent its working life on the Kettering Ironstone Railway until it closed in 1962. The locomotive was preserved by the Penrhyn Castle Railway Museum until it was gifted to WSVR in 2024. The charity has commenced the restoration of the locomotive for use in Waterford with the work being undertaken at a specialist engineering works in Darlington. As of October 2025, the restoration has progressed and a new boiler and firebox were nearing completion.

Current operational rolling stock consists of three diesel locomotives and two purpose-built semi-open bogie passenger carriages. A number of permanent way wagons are kept inside the shed at Kilmeaden. Two other Bord na Mona diesel locomotives built by Deutz LM179 [Deutz 57121 built 1960] and LM256 [Deutz 57837 built 1965]) and a Geismar track inspection vehicle are stored for restoration. An older, now disused, Deutz locomotive, LM259 [Deutz 57840 built 1965], is plinthed by the roadside beside the main entrance to the station.

The rolling stock received a new livery in 2020 as part of a rebranding exercise.

At Kilmeadan Station, an ex-Irish Rail grounded MkII carriage, No. 4106, is used as a ticket office and refreshment room.

Most of the track is bullhead track using a variety of cast iron chairs fastened to hardwood sleepers, including examples from the Great Southern and Western Railway, the Great Southern Railways, the Great Northern Railway, the Dublin and South Eastern Railway and more recent examples from CIÉ. Some sections use newer flat bottomed rail. Some of the older chairs were made by the Harland and Wolf company. All the points are currently manually operated.

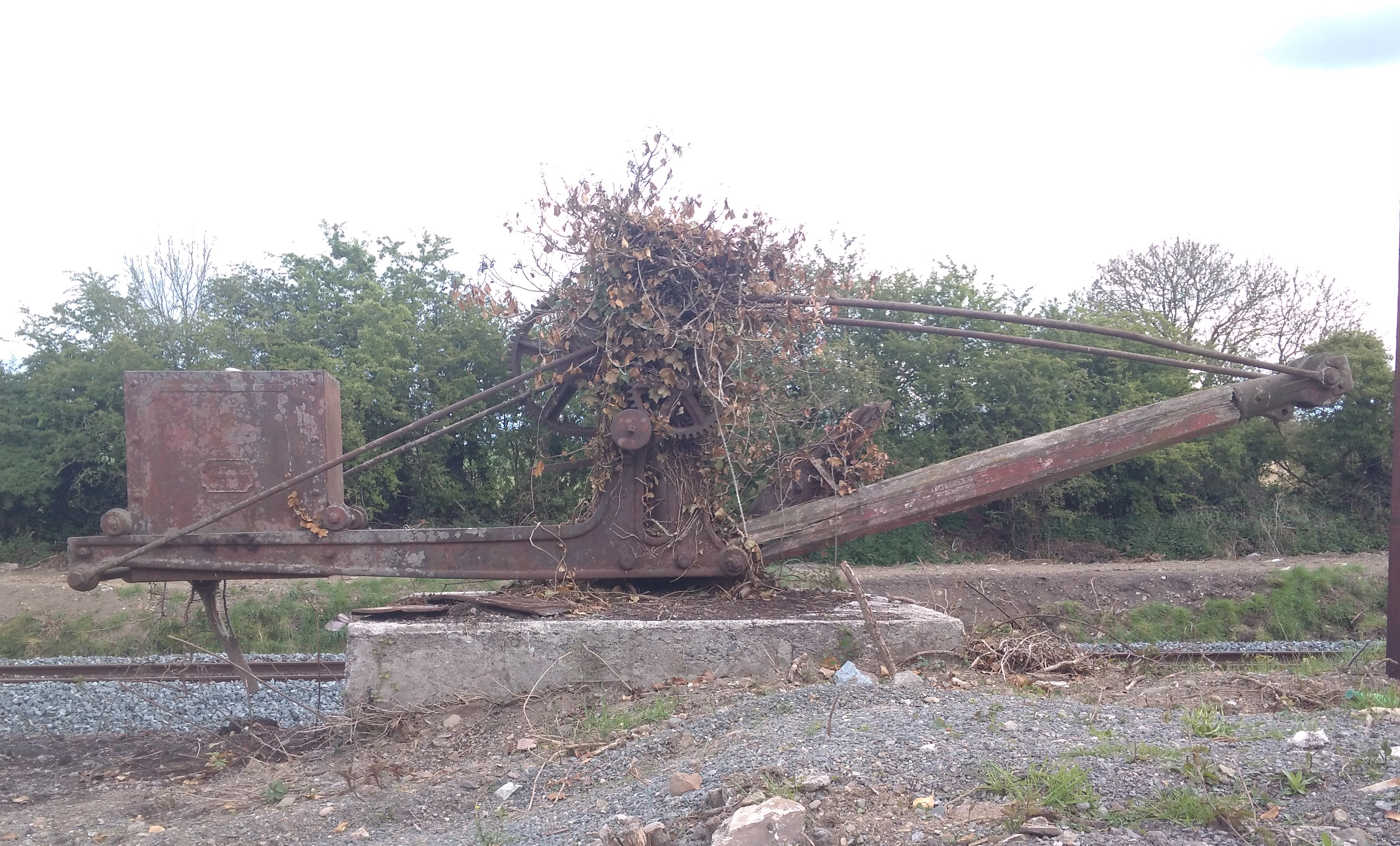
Goods crane from 1860s donated by Irish Rail in 2021

In May 2025, the charity was awarded funds from the Heritage Council, under the Community Heritage Grant Scheme, to restore a manual 2 ton goods crane previously located at Ferns Station, County Wexford. Donated and delivered to the railway by Irish Rail in 2021, the crane is believed to have been installed in or around 1863 when the station was opened by the Dublin Wicklow & Wexford Railway as part of their extension to Enniscorthy. The crane is one of 4 known examples to survive by the manufacturer Waddington & Co. of Leeds. Restoration was completed in October 2025, and is now displayed on the platform in Kilmeaden Station. University College Cork were the preservation consultants with the expert restoration being undertaken by Rock Forging Ltd of Kingscourt, County Cavan.

== Future development ==
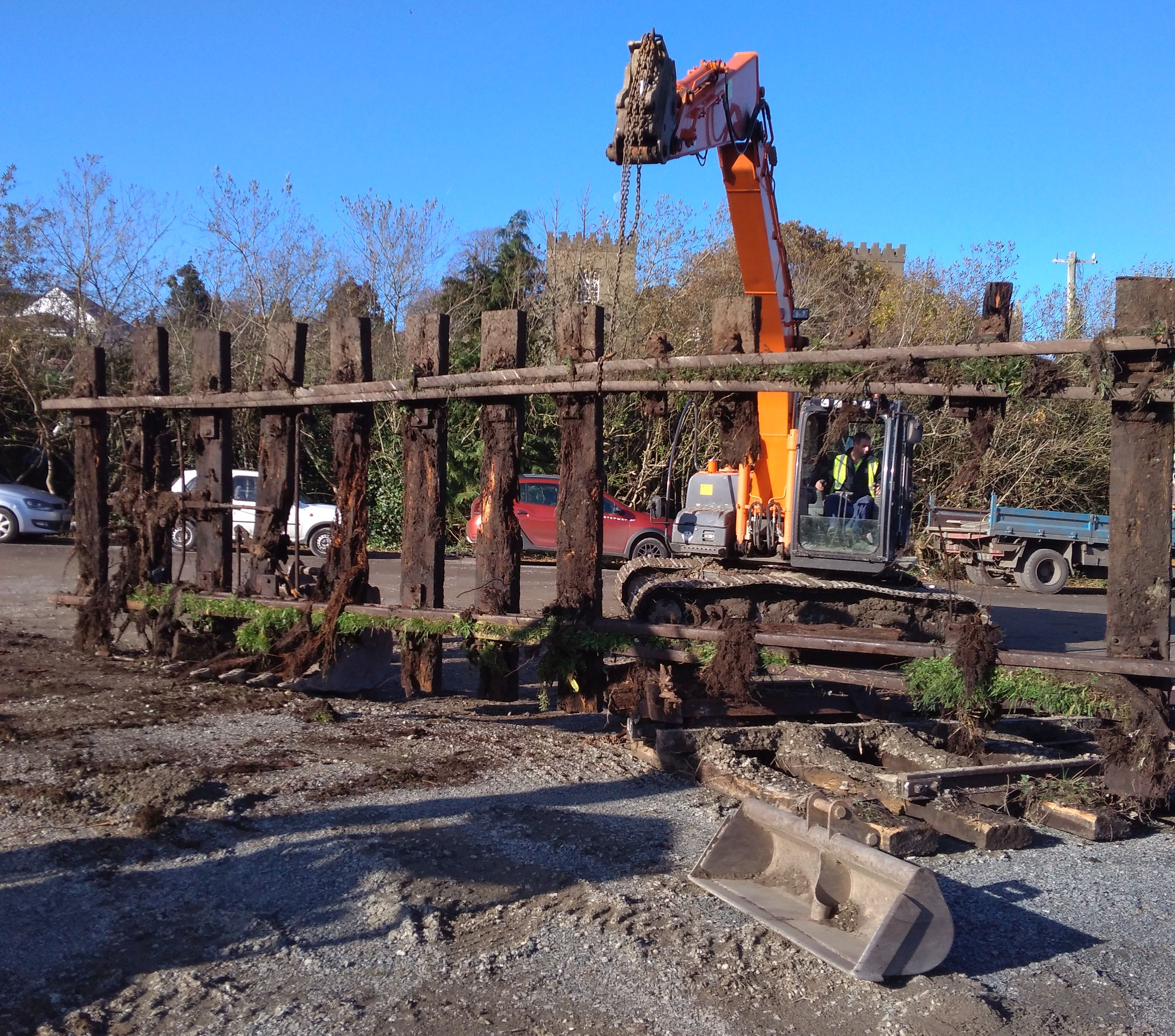
Lifting track at Rosbercon Station for reuse at the WSVR

New platforms were completed along the line at Mount Congreve Gardens and Bilberry where the local council has also created a coach parking area. Further halts are planned for the Woodstown Viking site and Waterford Institute of Technology Carriganore Campus.

In late 2020, with the support of Wexford County Council and Irish Rail, the engineering team were able to salvage track from Rosbercon (New Ross) station being lifted as part of the preparation for the Waterford to New Ross Greenway. This track is due to be used for the creation of an additional passing loop which is expected to be necessary for the preparations to return steam to the line. As of 2024, the charity was attempting to source additional infrastructure including a water tower and turntable.

In 2021, work was completed to connect the station to the nearby village of Kilmeaden by an extension of the Greenway undertaken by Waterford Council.

Discussions completed with Bord na Mona in early 2025 to acquire two additional locomotives for preservation which are no longer required by the semi-state organisation following the end of peat production in 2021. These were expected to be delivered in the second half of 2025.

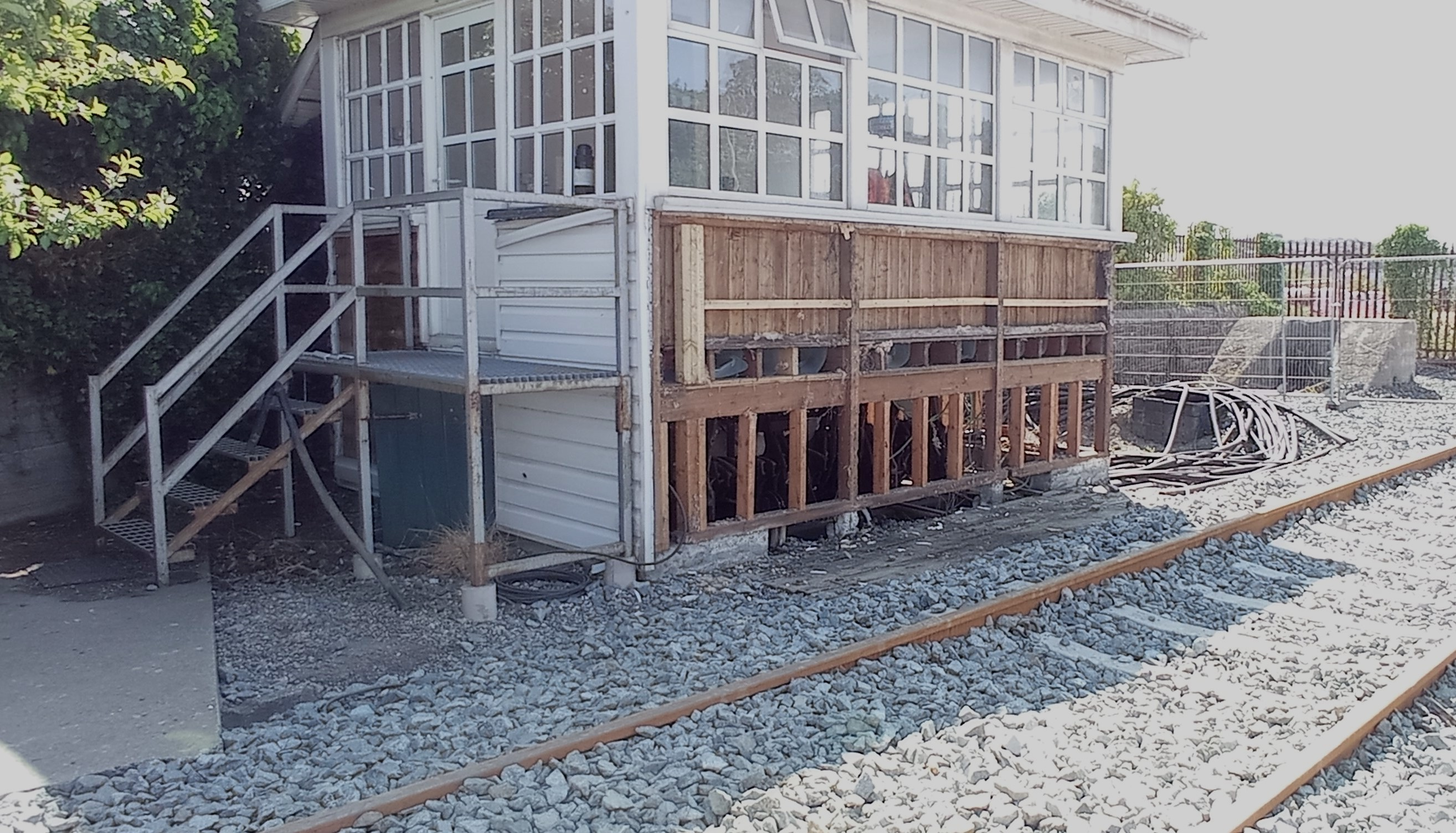
Abbey Junction Signal Box 2023 before demolition

In May 2025, the charity was awarded funding under the LEADER Programme for Rural Development to expand the facilities at Kilmeaden Station so as to provide better access for visitors to the railway's expanding collection and to provide space for educational events. At the time it was expected that the work could be completed by mid 2026.

The possibility of rebuilding a signal box is also being considered with Irish Rail having donated lever mechanisms from the Abbey Junction Signal Cabin which was demolished in 2023 to make way for the new station in Waterford City. Planning permission was granted in 2024 for the Signal Cabin and an extension to the Engine Shed.

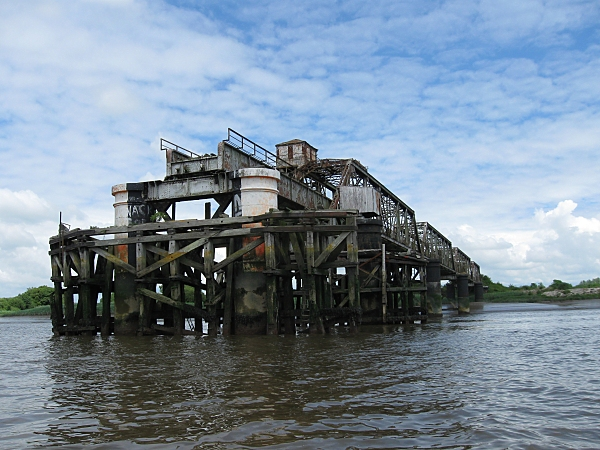
Red Iron Bridge over the River Suir

The charity's lease includes the original track bed from Gracedieu Junction towards the Red Bridge over the River Suir. This Iron Bridge was erected in 1906 by William Arroll & Co. of Glasgow. It was once Ireland's longest bridge at 367m. This track bed is currently overgrown and blocked in one area from spoil arising from the building of the Waterford bypass. The possibility of laying 1.5 km of track to the Red bridge is being considered.

The engineering team is also exploring the possibility of converting a 1960's Bord na Mona locomotive to operate on an electric power source. Working with a specialist firm based in Munster initial designs are being considered before a request for funding is submitted under the SEAI's Energy Efficiency Obligation Scheme.

== Volunteers and fundraising ==
The railway is operated by a number of trained volunteers and is governed as a charity by a board of volunteer directors. These volunteers are assisted by a small number of paid staff.

As a registered charity (CHY13857), regulated under the Charities Act 2009 by the Charities Regulator in Ireland, the railway can accept donations and avail of Revenue's "Charitable Donation Scheme".

== Gallery ==
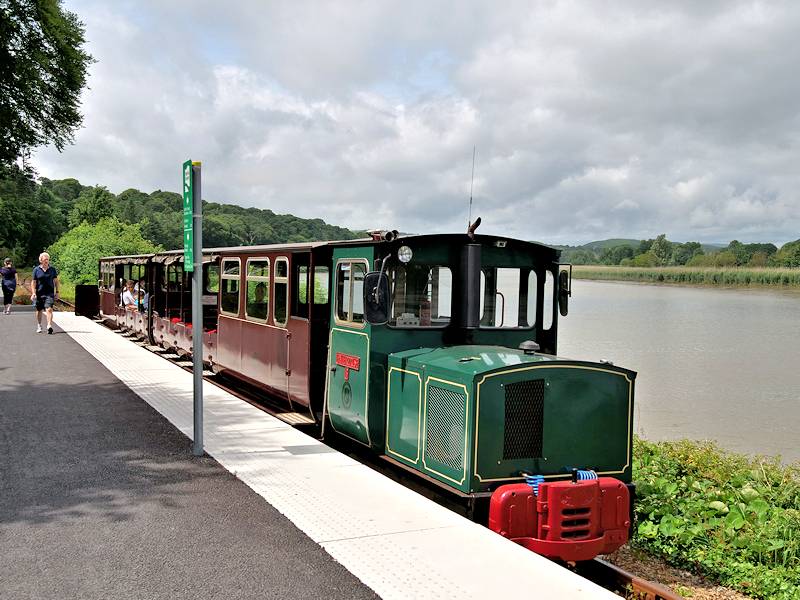
Mount Congreve Gardens halt

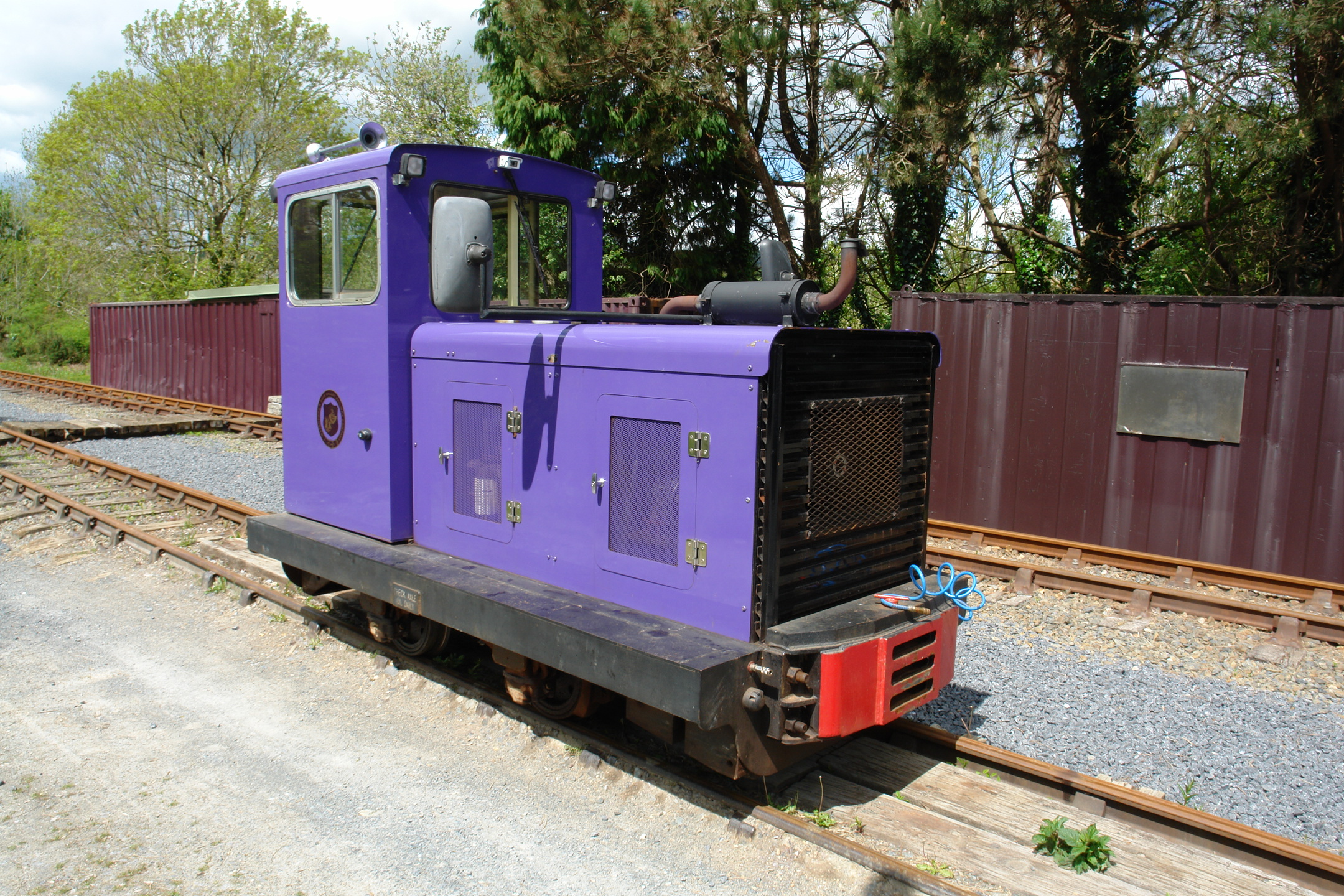
Hunslet locomotive

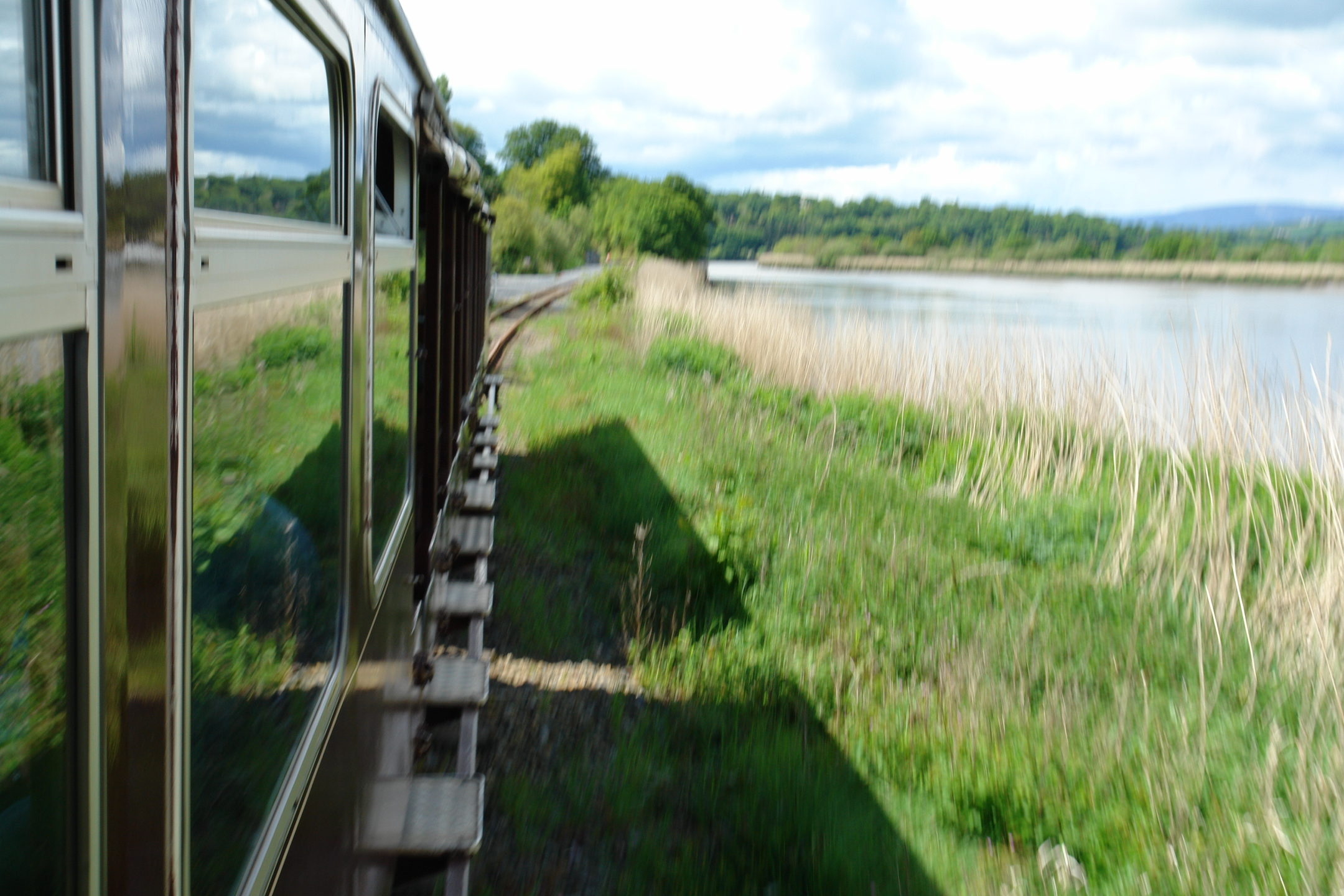
View towards Kilmeaden

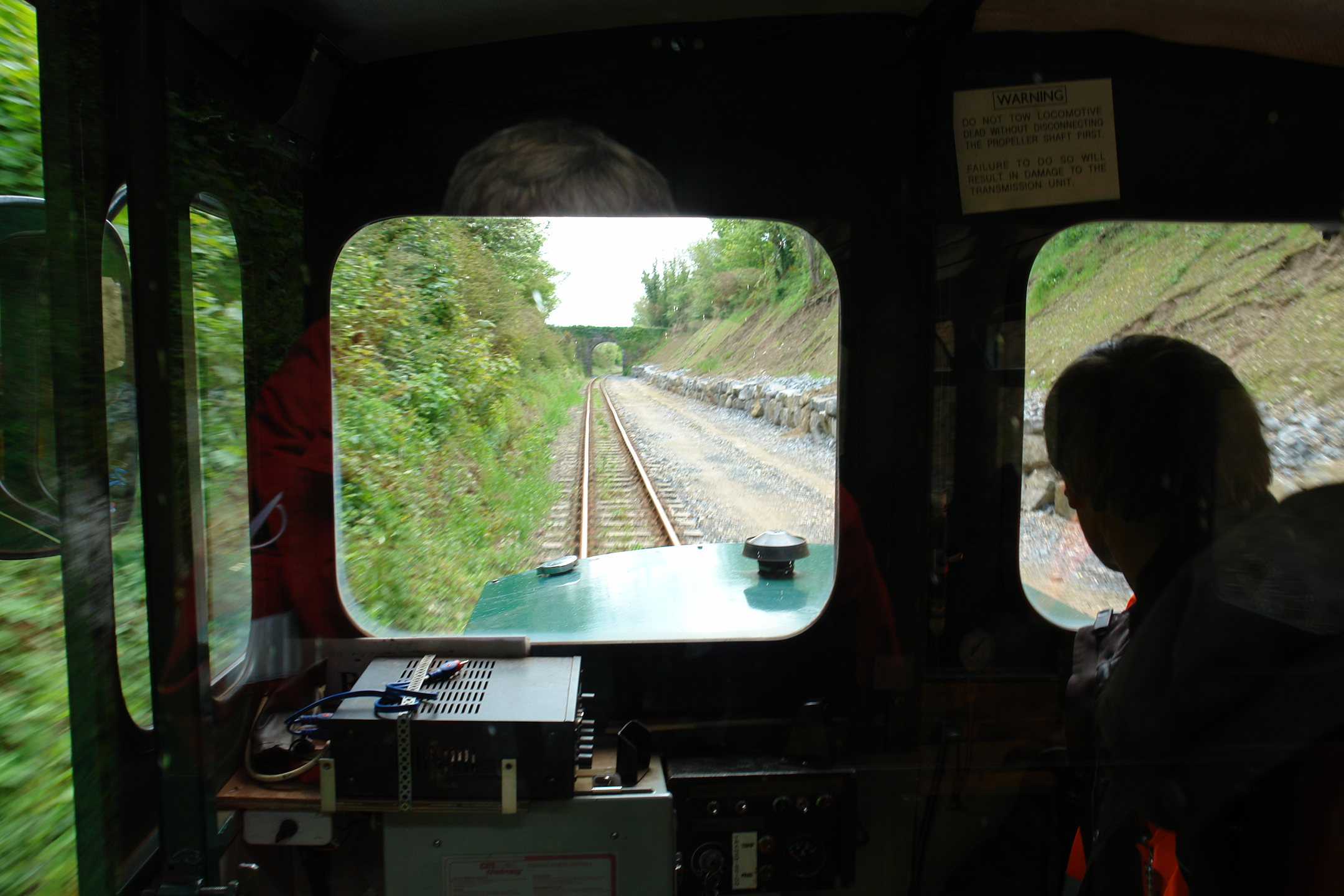
Leaving the station

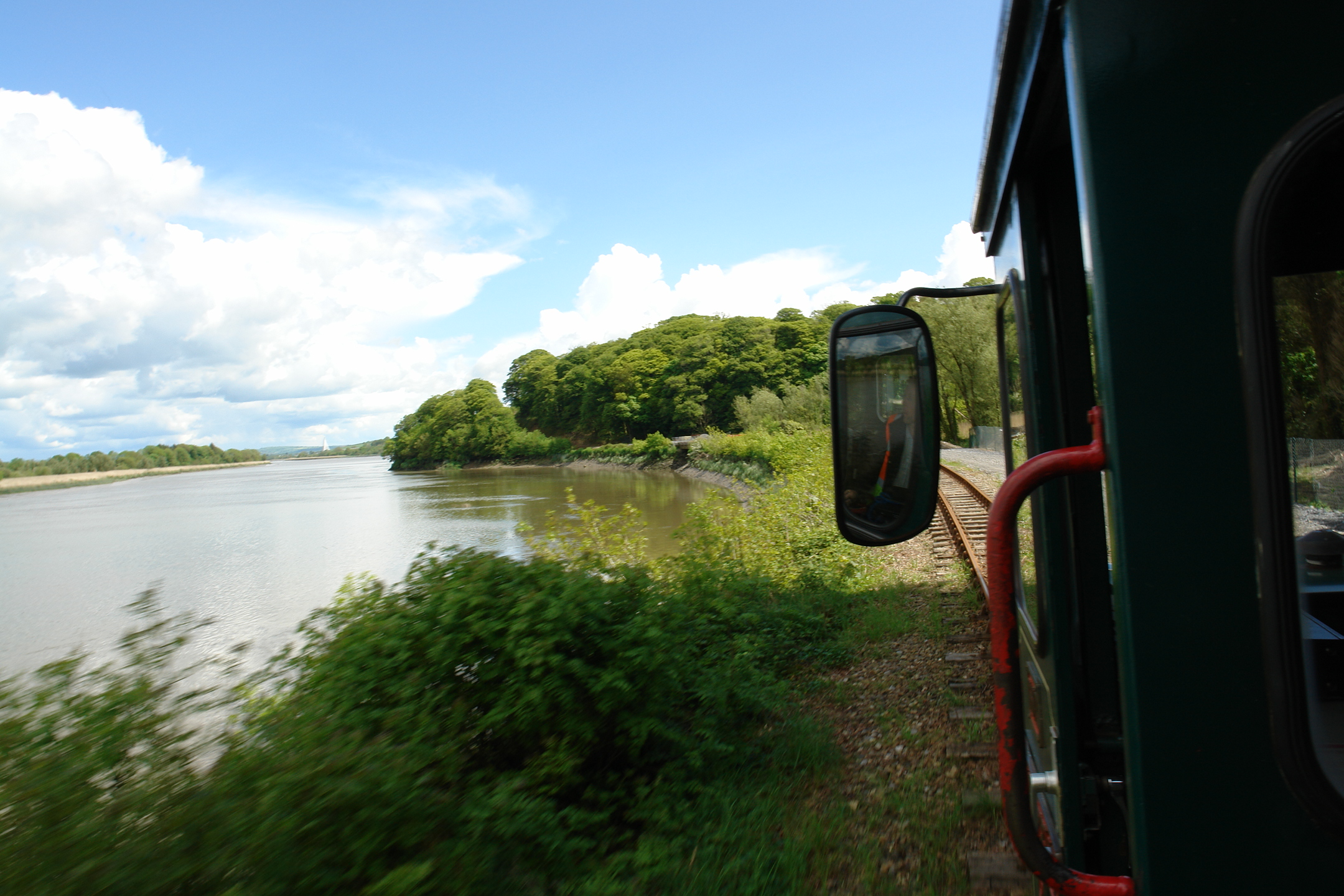
Heading towards Waterford City

== See also ==
- List of heritage railways in the Republic of Ireland
