= CGR 0-4-0ST 1881 =

South African steam locomotive

Table Bay Harbour 0-4-0ST (3'6") CGR 0-4-0ST 1881 South African 0-4-0ST 1881
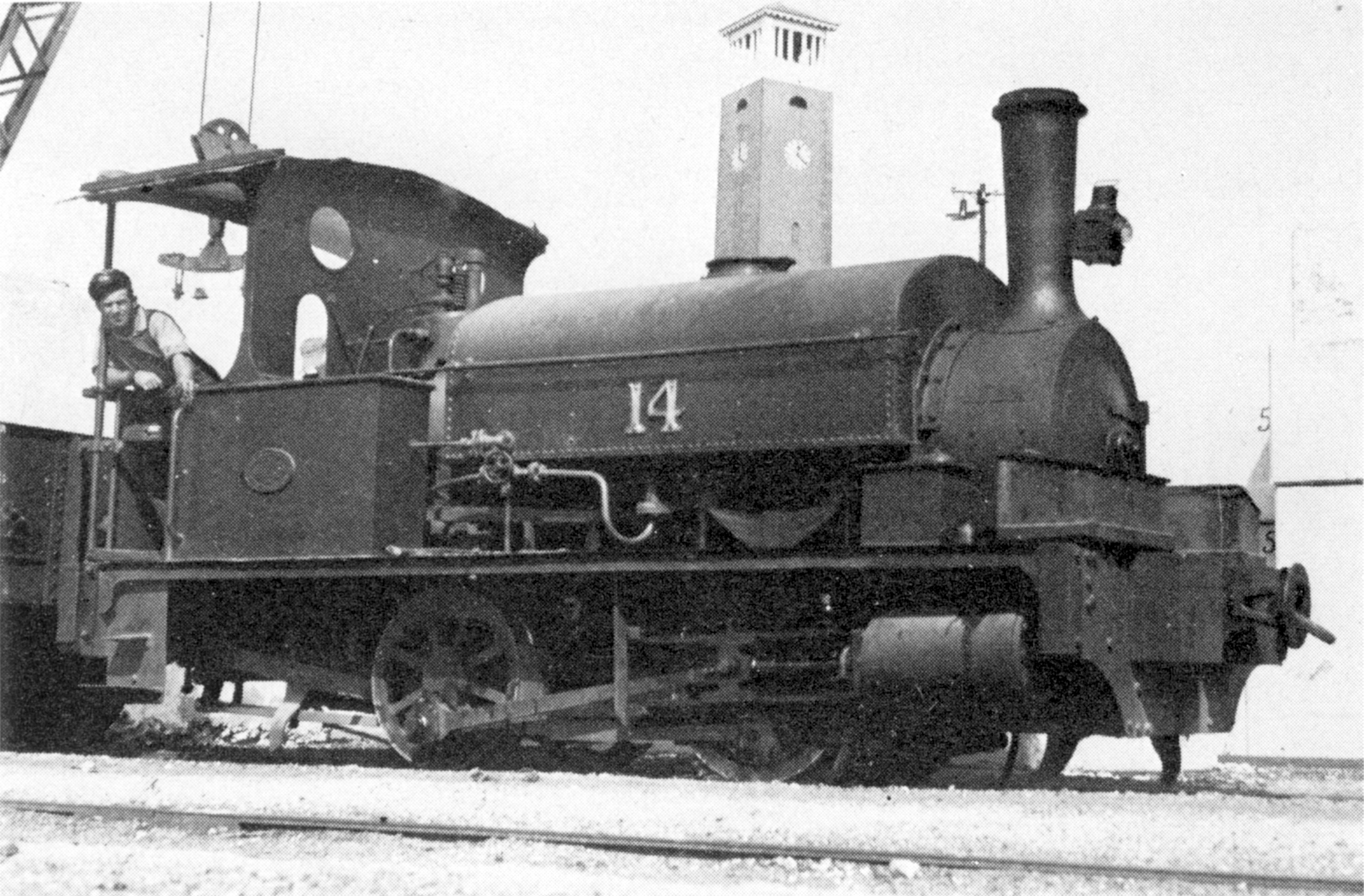
- Table Bay Harbour's no. 14, then CGR no. 14, then SAR no. 014, in Port Elizabeth c. 1930
Type and origin
- Power type: Steam
- Designer: Black, Hawthorn & Co.
- Builder: Black, Hawthorn & Co. Chapman and Furneaux; Hawthorn Leslie and Company
- Serial number: See table
- Build date: 1881-1904
Specifications
- Configuration
  - Whyte: 0-4-0ST
  - UIC: Bn2t
- Driver: 2nd coupled axle
- Gauge: 3 ft 6 in (1,067 mm) Cape gauge
- Coupled dia.: 34 in (864 mm)
- Wheelbase: 5 ft 6 in (1,676 mm)
- Length
  - Over couplers: 18 ft 4 1/2 in (5,601 mm)
  - Over beams: 16 ft 1 in (4,902 mm)
- Height: 9 ft 7 in (2,921 mm)
- Fuel type: Coal
- Fuel capacity: 10 long hundredweight (0.5 t)
- Water cap.: 350 imp gal (1,590 L)
- Firebox
  - Type: Round-top
  - Grate area: 5 sq ft (0.46 m^{2})
- Boiler
  - Type: Domeless
  - Pitch: 4 ft 6 in (1,372 mm)
  - Diameter: 2 ft 11 1/4 in (895 mm) outside
  - Tube plates: 8 ft (2,438 mm)
  - Small tubes: 70: 1 3/4 in (44 mm)
- Boiler pressure: 130 psi (896 kPa)
- Safety valve: Ramsbottom
- Heating surface
  - Firebox: 29 sq ft (2.7 m^{2})
  - Tubes: 274 sq ft (25.5 m^{2})
  - Total surface: 303 sq ft (28.1 m^{2})
- Cylinders: Two
- Cylinder size: 10 in (254 mm) bore 17 in (432 mm) stroke
- Valve gear: Stephenson
- Couplers: Johnston link-and-pin
Performance figures
- Tractive effort: 4,875 lbf (21.69 kN) @ 75%
Career
- Operators: Table Bay Harbour Board; Cape Government Railways; South African Railways
- Number in class: 13
- Numbers: 1, 6, 7, 9-17, 29
- Delivered: 1881-1904
- First run: 1881
- Last run: 1938

The Cape Government Railways 0-4-0ST of 1881 was a South African steam locomotive from the pre-Union era in the Cape of Good Hope.

Between 1881 and 1904, thirteen 0-4-0ST locomotives entered shunting service at the Table Bay Harbour in Cape Town. They were virtually identical to three Brunel gauge locomotives which entered service as breakwater construction locomotives in Table Bay Harbour between 1881 and 1893. In 1908, they were taken onto the Cape Government Railways roster and in 1912, when the South African Railways was established, eleven were still in stock.

== Manufacturers ==
Thirteen 0-4-0ST locomotives were acquired by the Table Bay Harbour Board in Cape Town between 1881 and 1904, for use as dock shunters at the harbour. They were delivered in five batches from three manufacturers.

- One locomotive, no. 6, was delivered from Black, Hawthorn & Co. in 1881.
- Between 1890 and 1893, it was followed by three more locomotives from the same manufacturer, numbered 1, 7 and 9.
- Two more locomotives followed from Black, Hawthorn in late 1895 or early 1896, numbered 10 and 11.
- During 1896, the firm of Black, Hawthorn was taken over by Chapman and Furneaux, who delivered another six of these locomotives in 1897 and 1898, numbered in the range from 12 to 17.
- In 1904, a single 0-4-0ST locomotive, no. 29, was delivered from Hawthorn Leslie and Company. Although it is not known, it is possible that it was built to the same design as the aforementioned locomotives since, when Chapman and Furneaux closed, its drawings, patterns and goodwill were bought by Hawthorn Leslie.

== Characteristics ==
The locomotives were virtually identical to three Brunel gauge 0-4-0ST locomotives which entered service as breakwater construction engines in Table Bay Harbour between 1881 and 1893. Apart from the gauge difference, the Brunel gauge engines had larger bore cylinders of 11 inches (279 millimetres) diameter, compared to the 10 inches (254 millimetres) bore of the Cape gauge engines. Both engine types had domeless boilers with a sandbox mounted in the centre of the saddle tank.

== Service ==
=== Cape Government Railways ===
By 1908, no. 1 was already either scrapped or sold. The remaining twelve locomotives were all taken onto the Cape Government Railways (CGR) roster in 1908. They retained their original Harbour Board numbers while in CGR service.

=== South African Railways ===
When the Union of South Africa was established on 31 May 1910, the three Colonial government railways (CGR, Natal Government Railways and Central South African Railways) were united under a single administration to control and administer the railways, ports and harbours of the Union. Even though the South African Railways and Harbours came into existence in 1910, the actual classification and renumbering of all the rolling stock of the three constituent railways was only implemented with effect from 1 January 1912.

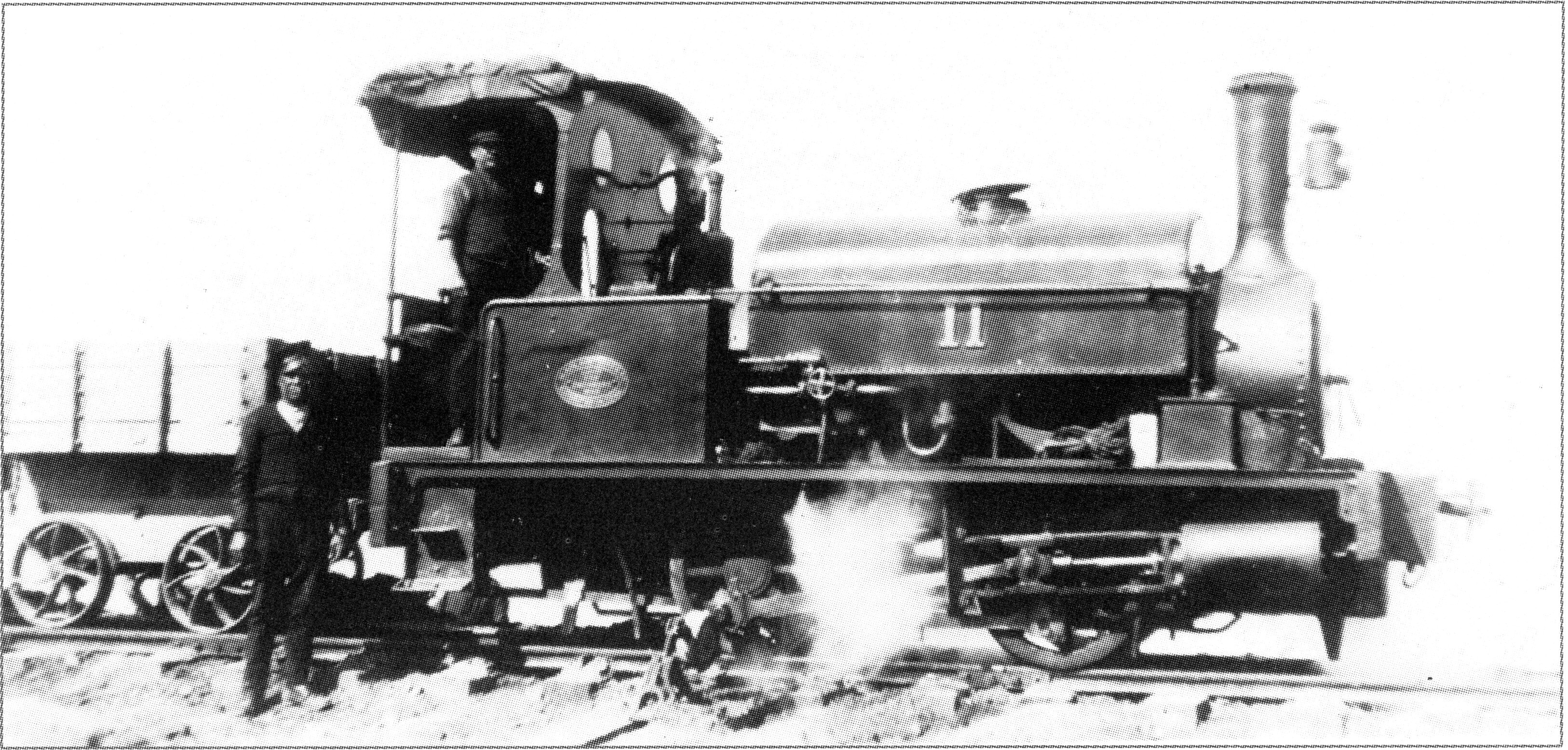
Black, Hawthorn-built no. 11, c. 1912

By 1912, eleven of these locomotives survived, but they were considered obsolete and excluded from the South African Railways (SAR) classification and renumbering program. While ten of them were listed in the notes to the renumbering lists as having been excluded, no. 15 was not mentioned. They were initially staged in a shed in Cape Town, but appear to have been placed back in service since a number of them survived into the late 1930s before being scrapped.

Obsolete locomotives on the SAR had the numeral "0" prefixed to their existing numbers, although on these engines it appears that new number plates to that effect were never affixed to them. In the SAR era, no. 09 was transferred to Mossel Bay Harbour and two, numbers 010 and 014, went to Port Elizabeth Harbour. These three engines were eventually scrapped at Uitenhage between 1916 and 1938. No. 15, which was not mentioned in the SAR renumbering lists of 1912, was sold to Lourenco Marques Forwarding Agency in Mozambique in 1913 and employed in the Lourenco Marques docks. The rest remained in service in Table Bay Harbour until they were withdrawn and scrapped between 1913 and 1935.

== Works numbers and disposition ==
The numbers, builders, works numbers, dates ordered, SAR numbers and disposition of these locomotives are listed in the table.

Cape Government Railways 0-4-0ST of 1881
No.	Builder	Works no.	Order date	SAR no.	Sold or scrapped
6	Black, Hawthorn	648	1881-07	06	1913-05 Salt River
1	Black, Hawthorn	1005	1889-12		1908 c. Scrapped or sold
7	Black, Hawthorn	1021	1890-08	07	1935-10 Salt River
9	Black, Hawthorn	1083	1893-03	09	1916-12 Uitenhage
10	Black, Hawthorn	1128	1895-10	010	1935-10 Uitenhage
11	Black, Hawthorn	1129	1895-10	011	1935-10 Salt River
12	Chapman & Furneaux	1149	1897-03	012	1929-03 Salt River
13	Chapman & Furneaux	1152	1897-05	013	1929-02 Salt River
14	Chapman & Furneaux	1168	1898-07	014	1938-08 Uitenhage
15	Chapman & Furneaux	1169	1898-07		1913-03 Sold to LM
16	Chapman & Furneaux	1170	1898-07	016	1929-03 Salt River
17	Chapman & Furneaux	1171	1898-07	017	1935-10 Salt River
29	Hawthorn Leslie	2567	1904	029	1935-10 Salt River

== Illustration ==
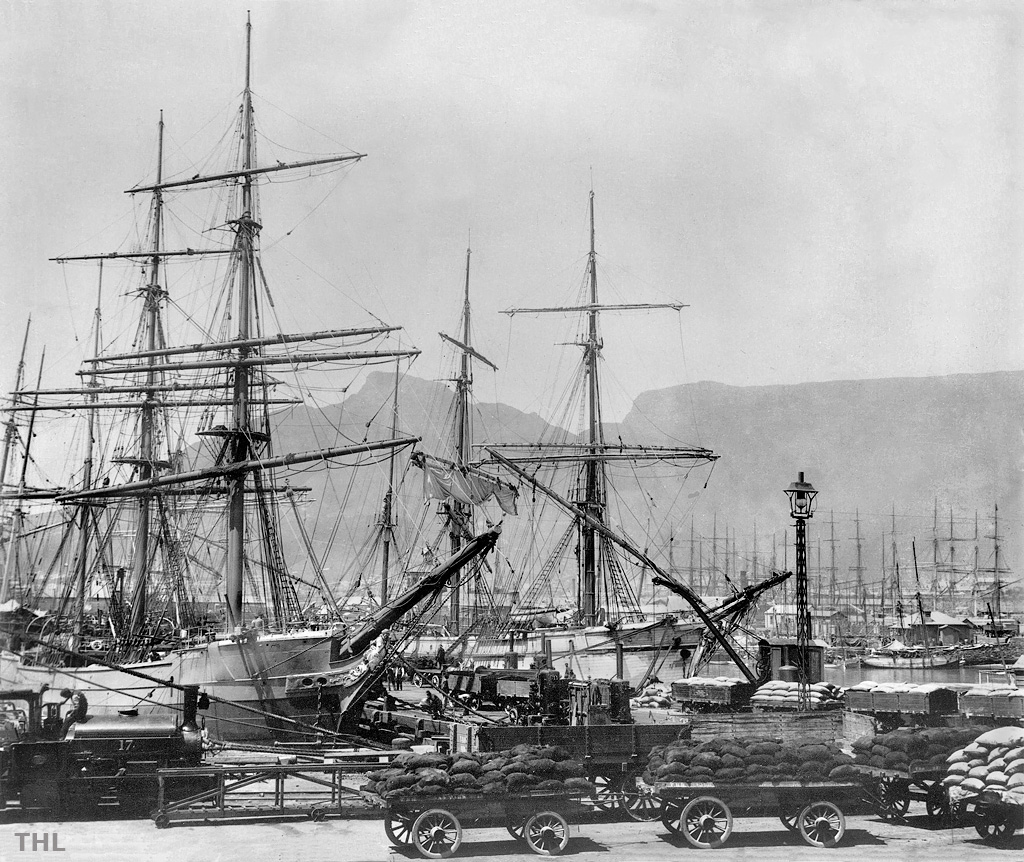
Chapman & Furneaux-built no. 17 in Table Bay Harbour, c. 1898
