= Table Bay Harbour 0-4-0ST =

Class of 3 South African 0-4-0ST locomotives

Table Bay Harbour 0-4-0ST (7' ¼")
Type and origin
- Power type: Steam
- Designer: Black, Hawthorn & Co.
- Builder: Black, Hawthorn & Co.
- Serial number: 642, 646, 1079
- Build date: 1881–1893
- Total produced: 3
Specifications
- Configuration
  - Whyte: 0-4-0ST (Four-coupled)
  - UIC: Bn2t
- Driver: 2nd coupled axle
- Gauge: 7 ft 1/4 in (2,140 mm) Brunel
- Coupled dia.: 34 in (864 mm)
- Wheelbase: 5 ft 6 in (1,676 mm)
- Length
  - Over couplers: 18 ft 4 1/2 in (5,601 mm)
  - Over beams: 16 ft 1 in (4,902 mm)
- Height: 9 ft 7 in (2,921 mm)
- Fuel type: Coal
- Fuel capacity: 10 long hundredweight (0.5 t)
- Water cap.: 350 imp gal (1,590 L)
- Firebox
  - Type: Round-top
  - Grate area: 5 sq ft (0.46 m^{2})
- Boiler
  - Type: Domeless
  - Pitch: 4 ft 6 in (1,372 mm)
  - Diameter: 2 ft 11 1/4 in (895 mm) outside
  - Tube plates: 8 ft (2,438 mm)
  - Small tubes: 70: 1 3/4 in (44 mm)
- Boiler pressure: 130 psi (896 kPa)
- Heating surface
  - Firebox: 29 sq ft (2.7 m^{2})
  - Tubes: 274 sq ft (25.5 m^{2})
  - Total surface: 303 sq ft (28.1 m^{2})
- Cylinders: Two
- Cylinder size: 11 in (279 mm) bore 17 in (432 mm) stroke
- Valve gear: Stephenson
- Couplers: Buffers-and-chain
Performance figures
- Tractive effort: 4,875 lbf (21.69 kN) @ 75%
Career
- Operators: Table Bay Harbour Board
- Number in class: 3
- Numbers: 4, 5, 8
- Delivered: 1881–1893
- First run: 1881
- Last run: c. 1904

The Table Bay Harbour 0-4-0ST of 1881 was a South African steam locomotive from the pre-Union era in the Cape of Good Hope.

Between 1881 and 1893, three 0-4-0 saddle-tank locomotives entered construction service at the Table Bay Harbour in Cape Town. They were built to Brunel gauge for breakwater construction and were virtually identical to thirteen Cape gauge locomotives which entered service as dock shunters in Table Bay Harbour between 1881 and 1904.

== Manufacturers ==
Three 0-4-0 saddle-tank locomotives were acquired by the Table Bay Harbour Board in Cape Town between 1881 and 1893. They were built to 7 ft 1/4 in (2,140 mm) Brunel gauge for service as breakwater construction engines on the Table Bay Harbour improvement project. The project had been started in 1860 and involved the excavation of two basins and the construction of breakwater piers. The locomotives were delivered in two batches from Black, Hawthorn & Co, numbers 4 and 5 in 1881 and no. 8 in 1893.

== Characteristics ==
The locomotives were virtually identical to thirteen Cape gauge 0-4-0ST locomotives which entered service as dock shunters in Table Bay Harbour between 1881 and 1904. Apart from the gauge difference, the Brunel gauge engines had larger bore cylinders of 11 inches (279 millimetres) diameter, compared to the 10 inches (254 millimetres) bore of the Cape gauge engines. Both engine types had domeless boilers with a sandbox mounted in the centre of the saddle tank.

== Service ==
By the time the broad gauge Table Bay Harbour construction railway was closed in 1904, engine no. 4 was no longer reflected in the Table Bay Harbour Board's locomotive register and had presumably already been scrapped. Engine no. 8 was sold as scrap to Vaggens & Company in May 1907. Engine no. 5 could possibly have been regauged to Cape gauge and put to work as dock shunter in Table Bay Harbour, but this has not been confirmed and it is more likely that it was staged at the Salt River workshops and used as a source of spare parts until it was scrapped there in May 1913.

== Works numbers and disposition ==
The numbers, works numbers, dates ordered and disposition of these locomotives are listed in the table.

Table Bay Harbour 0-4-0ST of 1881
No.	Works no.	Order date	Sold or scrapped
4	642	1881–04	Scrapped c. 1904
5	646	1881–07	Scrapped 1913–05
8	1079	1892–12	Sold to Vaggens 1907–05
