= Kettering Ironstone Railway =

Coordinates: 52.3888°N 0.7833°W

Overview
- Headquarters: Kettering
- Locale: England
- Dates of operation: 1870s–1962
- Successor: Abandoned

Technical
- Track gauge: 3 ft (914 mm)
- Length: 3 miles

The Kettering Ironstone Railway was an industrial 3 ft (914 mm) narrow gauge railway that served the ironstone quarries in the Northampton Sand Formation around Kettering.

== History ==
Ironstone was discovered to the north of Kettering in 1858 when the Midland Railway mainline was driven through a hill where the position of Glendon South Junction was built some years later. In 1866 quarrying started just to the west of the railway from Glendon North Junction in an arc that continued to Glendon South Junction. Horses worked the tramways to start with to haul the ore to sidings beside the Midland line. An ironworks was constructed at the immediate southern end of the straight railway line from Glendon South Junction towards Kettering which become known as Kettering Furnaces and opened in 1878. The ore from Glendon was actually sold on the open market until blast furnaces at Finedon were built. Surprisingly the ore was never sent to Kettering Furnaces with Kettering having its own quarries nearby and tramways.

To feed the newly installed blast furnaces, the tramways were extended to new ore fields to the south and west. In 1879 a 3ft gauge steam locomotive arrived from Black, Hawthorn & Co to deal with the greater traffic.

As the closer ironstone pits became worked out. the tramways expanded to reach new sources of ore. In 1890 a much larger Manning Wardle locomotive was acquired second-hand to work these longer lines. In all three of these "long boiler special" 0-6-0ST locomotives were acquired for the railway.

In 1913 quarrying started on land near the village of Thorpe Malsor, more than two miles from the ironworks. A new branch of the tramway was laid to reach these, requiring a substantial viaduct to cross the valley below the village. In 1926 a unique double Sentinel locomotive was purchased for the Thorpe Malsor branch, though it was not a great success.

A final new set of ore fields were opened at Bunker Hill in 1933, again served by a new tramway branch.

After the Second World War, there was a general decline in demand for iron. The Thorpe Malsor pits were abandoned and the branch removed in 1949. The ironworks were nationalised in 1951, and the Bunker Hill pits were immediately abandoned. This left only the pits around Rothwell village in operation, served by a long tramway branch. The whole system was purchased by Stewarts & Lloyds in late 1956. The furnaces shut down in 1959, but ore extraction continued to supply the much larger Corby ironworks. Trains continued to run until October 1962. The remaining tramways were lifted by early 1963.

== Locomotives ==
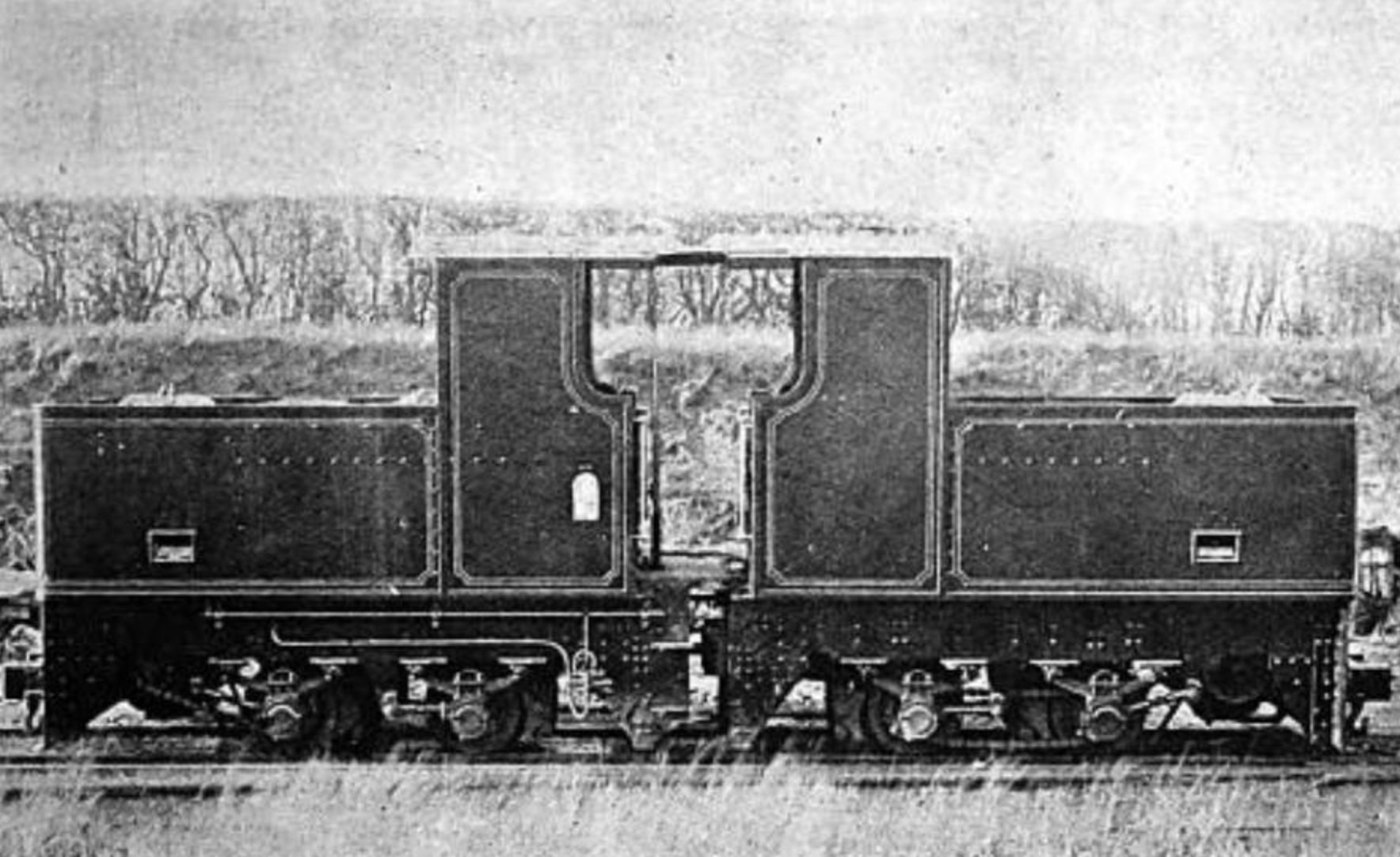
Sentinel double steam locomotive

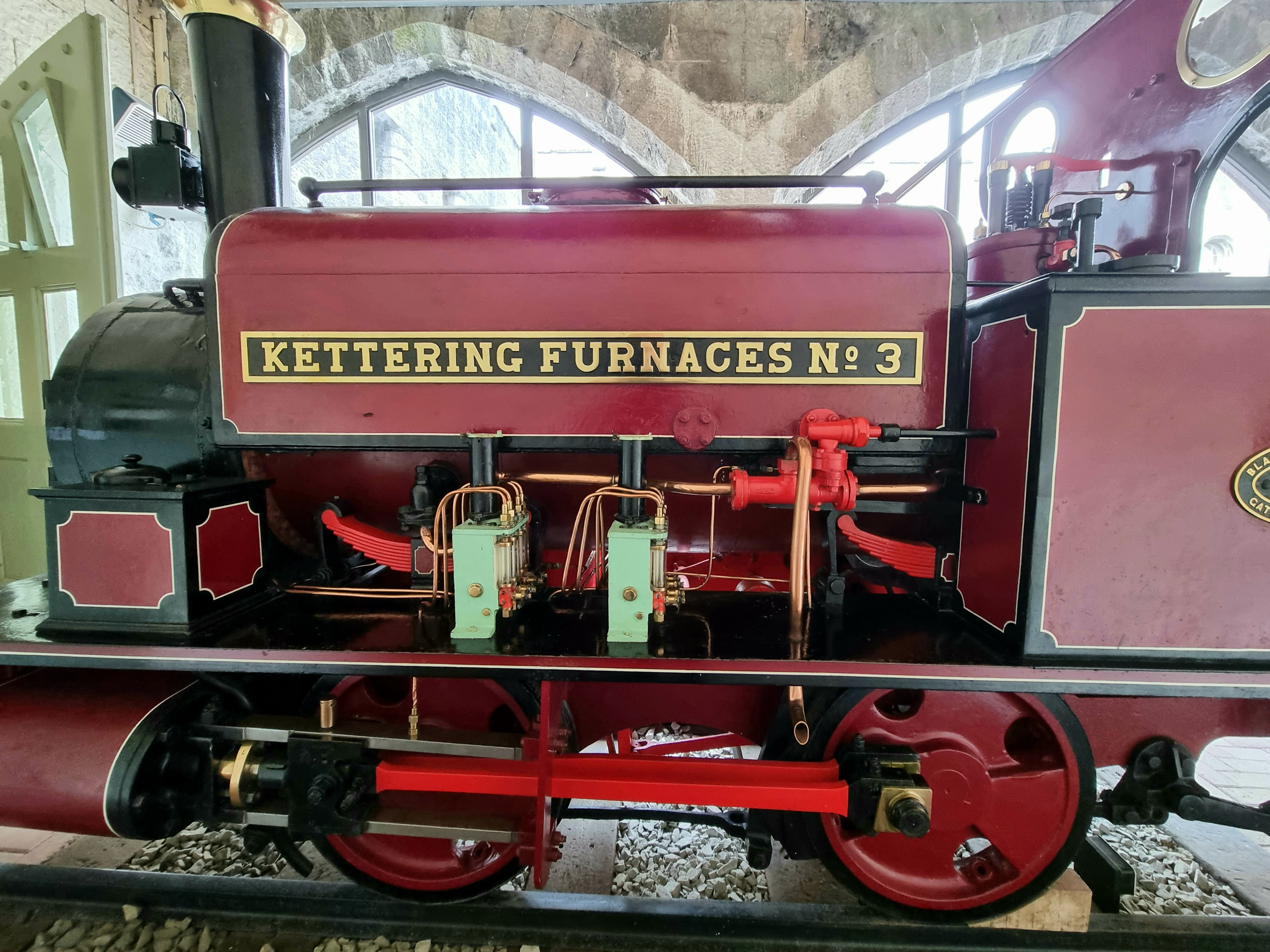
Kettering Furnaces No. 3

Name	Builder	Type	Date	Works number	Notes
Kettering Furnaces No. 2	Black, Hawthorne	0-4-0ST	1879	501	Scrapped 1963.
Kettering Furnaces No. 3	Black, Hawthorne	0-4-0ST	1885	859	Preserved at the Penrhyn Castle Railway Museum until 2024, when it was donated to the Waterford Suir Valley Railway.
Kettering Furnaces No. 4	Black, Hawthorne	0-4-0ST	1887		Withdrawn 1924. Scrapped 1927.
Kettering Furnaces No. 6	Manning Wardle	0-6-0ST	1889	1123	Rebuilt by Robert Stephenson and Hawthorns in 1949. Scrapped 1963.
Kettering Furnaces No. 7	Manning Wardle	0-6-0ST	1897	1370	Rebuilt by Robert Stephenson and Hawthorns in 1950. Scrapped 1963.
Kettering Furnaces No. 8	Manning Wardle	0-6-0ST	1906	1675	Preserved by the Welland Valley Vintage Traction Club
	Sentinel	4wG+4wG	1926	6412	A unique articulated geared steam locomotive, heavily used in the 1930s, but scrapped in 1960

== See also ==
- British industrial narrow gauge railways
