= Ferns Abbey =

Ruined Augustinian abbey in Wexford, Ireland

- Mainistir Aodháin
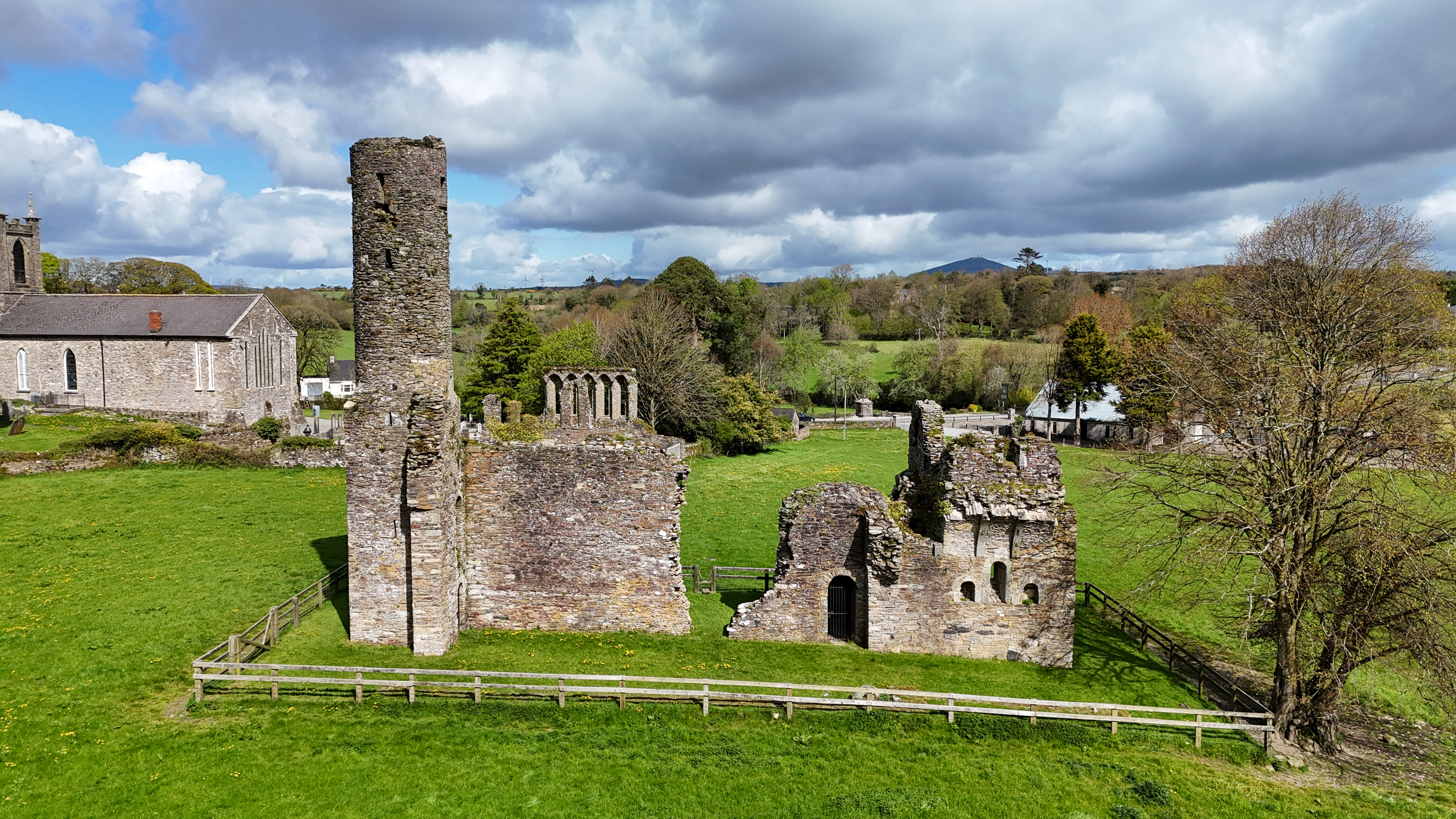
- Interactive map of Ferns Abbey

Monastery information
- Other names: Fearna-nor-Maedhog; Ferna-; Fernes, Fernis; St Mary’s Abbey; Saint Aidan's Monastery
- Order: Augustinian
- Established: c.1160
- Disestablished: 7 April 1539

People
- Founder: Diarmait Mac Murchada

Ferns Abbey (Irish: Mainistir Aodháin) is a ruined Augustinian abbey in Ferns, County Wexford, Ireland. Likely built on the site of an early Christian monastic site founded by Máedóc of Ferns, the standing remains were built by Diarmait Mac Murchada c.1160. The abbey was suppressed on 7 April 1539.

The abbey was claustral in layout, and features an unusual tower that is half square, half round. Partially rebuilt in 1846, many original architectural elements were damaged at this time.

== History ==
The abbey is built on the site of previous ecclesiastical foundations. The site was originally home to an oratory dedicated to Máedóc of Ferns. Diarmait Mac Murchada constructed two abbeys on the site. The first was built sometime prior to 1160, was dedicated to Máedóc (also known as Saint Aidan), and was named Saint Aidan's Monastery. This monastery was burnt down in 1154 and was rebuilt to create the final structure on the site.

A charter for the construction of the final abbey was granted to Diarmait Mac Murchada by the Augustinians between 1160 and 1162.

The abbey was suppressed on 7 April 1539.

== Architecture ==
The abbey was built in the Romanesque architectural style. Today, only a tower, a stretch of wall, and a small, ruined chamber survive. Excavations of the church carried out in 1910 revealed the foundations of several other elements of the abbey. The abbey was partially re-built by the owners in 1846, during which many of the original architectural details were damaged.

The abbey was claustral in layout and featured a cloister garth measuring 22 metres (72 ft) by 20.06 metres (65.83 ft). The nave of the church narrowed slightly from west to east, a feature found in several early churches in Ireland, and regarded as a mark of architectural refinement. The church featured a chancel, sacristy, and a priest's chambers; the chancel and the priest's chambers featured stone vaulted ceilings.

The abbey's tower is considered unusual as it is square at the base but changes to a round tower. The square portion is 8.18 metres (26.83 ft) tall, while the round portion is 9.3 metres (30.5 ft) tall, for a total height of 17.5 metres (57.3 ft). This is considered illustrative of the transition which was taking place from the "detached" round tower, to the "attached" square tower.
