= Ambrose Congreve =

Irish industrialist

Ambrose Christian Congreve CBE (14 April 1907 – 28 May 2011) was an Irish industrialist, best known for his world-famous garden at Mount Congreve.

== Early life ==
He was the son of Major John Congreve and Lady Helena Ponsonby, the daughter of the 8th Earl of Bessborough. He was educated at Eton and Trinity College, Cambridge. Childhood visits to the Rothschild estate at Exbury inspired a lifelong love of gardening.

== Business career ==
In 1927, Congreve joined Unilever, working in England and in China. From 1939, he took over the running of Humphreys & Glasgow, the gasworks manufacturers and petrochemical engineers. Dr Arthur Glasgow, his father-in-law, was a co-founder of the firm.

He remained there until 1983, when the company was sold to an American concern. However, his abiding passion was gardening, especially at Mount Congreve, near Kilmeaden, County Waterford.

== Mount Congreve house and gardens ==
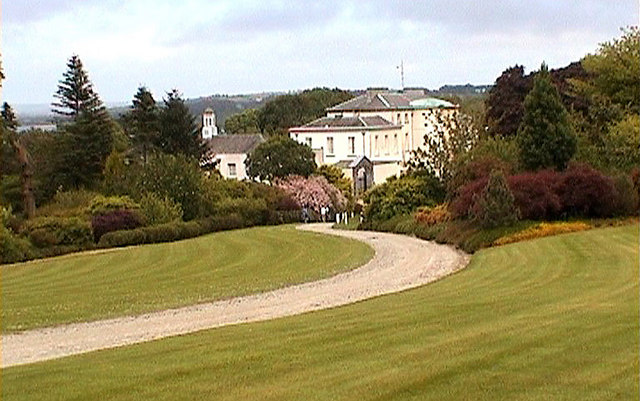
Mount Congreve house and gardens

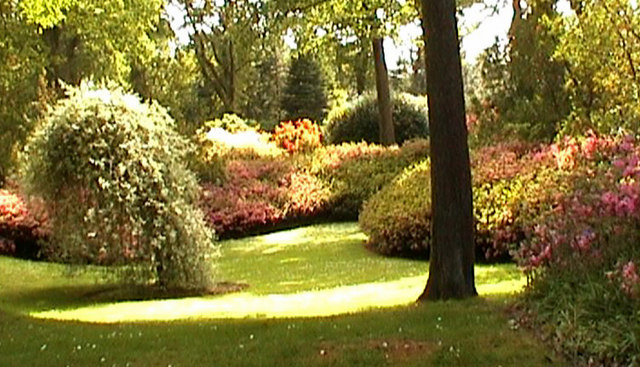
Mount Congreve woodland garden

The Mount Congreve estate lies just outside the village of Kilmeadan. The house was built by famous local architect John Roberts in 1760. Several generations of Congreves had lived on the estate, which then included only a simple terraced garden and surrounding woodland. Ambrose Congreve moved into Mount Congreve with his wife in 1968 and began extensive work on the gardens, inspired and encouraged by Lionel de Rothschild. In 1962 he hired Herman Dool, a Dutch horticulturist as head gardener. Together, they transformed Mount Congreve into a prize-winning garden, famous the world over for its rare species of plants and impressive planting scheme.

The gardens now consist of around seventy acres of intensively planted woodland garden and a four-acre walled garden. In addition to the 18th-century house (the ancestral home of Ambrose Congreve), there are wall-gardens and glasshouses, and more than 16 miles of paths.

Congreve was dedicated to maintaining the historic gardens at his family's estate until his final years. During his lifetime, he won 13 Gold Medal awards at the Chelsea Garden Show in London for the garden. In 1987 he was awarded a Veitch Memorial Medal by the Royal Horticultural Society, and a Gold Medal in 2001 for a "Great Garden of the World" by the Botanic Gardens in Boston, Massachusetts.

After Congreve's death, aged 104 years, the Mount Congreve estate was left to the Irish State. The gardens are now open to the public all year round.

== Personal life ==
He married Margaret Glasgow in 1935. The couple divided their time between two homes, Mount Congreve in Ireland and Winkfield Manor in Berkshire, England. He was appointed CBE in 1965.
