= Ferns Castle =

Castle in County Wexford, Ireland

Coordinates: 52.5908°N 6.4992°W

- Caisleán Fearna (Irish)
- Aerial view of the castle
- Interactive map of Ferns Castle
- Location: Ferns, County Wexford, Leinster, Ireland

History
- Built: c.1220
- Demolished: 1649

Site notes
- Governing body: Office of Public Works

Ferns Castle (Irish Caisleán Fearna) is a ruined 13th century castle in the town of Ferns, County Wexford, Ireland.

== History ==
Although the settlement had a monastic history stretching back to the sixth century, the borough was re-founded by Richard de Clare (Strongbow) as one of his demesne manors before 1176. an Anglo-Norman castle was first recorded in 1177, when it was erected by the sons of Maurice FitzGerald and immediately destroyed, suggesting that it was an earth-and-timber construction. A rampart excavated under the castle may represent this structure or an earlier Irish fortress of King Dermot.

The present stone castle was first recorded in 1232, and was probably built in the early 13th century, either by William Marshal or his son, William Marshal II. It takes the form of a turreted tower, i.e. a (rather irregular) square structure with a large round tower at each corner, which was an arrangement among some Anglo-Norman castles in Ireland, though not in England. Other roughly contemporary examples exist at Carlow and Lea, and slightly later at Terryglass. This type of castle is particularly associated with the Marshal family. It is unclear whether the central structure was a fully-roofed keep or a courtyard with timber-framed buildings leaning against the outer walls. The large size of the castle (18x20m) and the position of the hall fireplace suggest that the latter was more likely, The ground floor was on two levels, as only part of the castle stood upon the bedrock. The entrance was on the first floor, and the whole building was surrounded by a rock-cut moat and defended with a barbican. The first floor also contained the great hall, recognisable by its fireplace with a joggled lintel. The fine Gothic windows and vaulted chapel suggest that it was completed, remodelled or rebuilt in the mid-13th century under William de Valence.

The castle was the target of repeated Irish attacks, both for its strategic significance and its symbolic importance as the former seat of the Mac Murchada dynasty (also known as the MacMurroughs). As a result of these raids and English neglect, it became dilapidated and was considered worthless in a 1324 inquisition. In 1331, the castle was burnt by the Irish, who were subsequently defeated, with many drowning in the River Slaney while trying to escape the English. The castle was again captured by the Irish in 1346, but quickly repaired. In 1349, the Anglo-Norman Bishop John Esmond of Ferns was deposed by the Pope, and barricaded himself in the castle, only being captured when one of the next bishop's men gained access and opened the gate. In the late 1350s, the Irish again destroyed the castle. The Mac Murchada again seized the castle in the 1370s, but this time they held the largely-derelict fortress until 1536.

In that year, the Mac Murchada rose in rebellion, and the Lord Deputy Leonard Grey was sent to besiege the castle. This he achieved by using a sniper to shoot the castle's captain, demoralising the garrison. He then threatened to break the walls with his cannon, and to put the inhabitants to the sword, after which they agreed to surrender. In order to placate the Mac Murchada, they were allowed to retain the castle, but their rent was increased from 5 marks to 80. After 1540, the castle was commanded by a series of English Protestant officials, but this did not reduce the Irish threat, with the castle again being burnt (this time by the Kavanaghs) in 1577. Ferns Castle was garrisoned for the final time by the Confederates against Oliver Cromwell in 1649, after which it fell into ruin. By the late 18th century, the castle had decayed to roughly its present condition, with only the east and south walls, the south-east tower and half of the south-west tower still standing. The site was excavated and conserved in 1970, and is now managed and opened to the public by the Office of Public Works.

== Gallery ==
The castle from the south. The gap in the wall is the site of the main entrance.

The interior, showing the hall fireplace in the east wall.

Vaulting in the chapel, at the base of the south-east tower.
