= Kilmeadan =

Village in County Waterford, Ireland

Kilmeaden Irish: Cill Mhíodáin
- Village
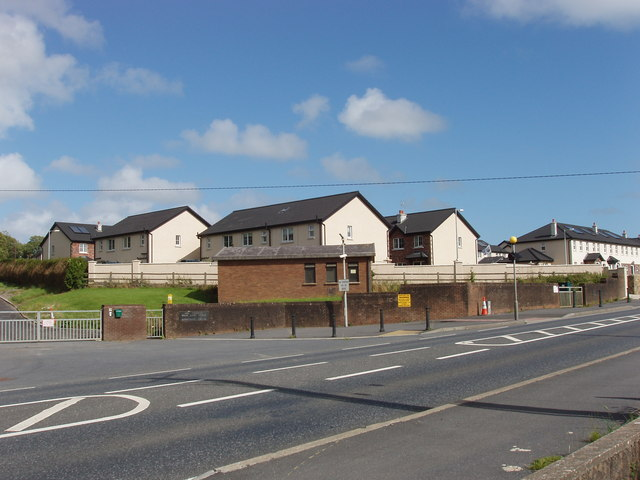
- Residential housing near Kilmeaden village centre

- Location in Ireland
- Coordinates: 52°14′03″N 7°14′37″W
- Country: Ireland
- Province: Munster
- County: County Waterford

Population (2016)
  - Total: 258
- Time zone: UTC+0 (WET)
  - Summer (DST): UTC+1 (IST (WEST))

Kilmeaden or Kilmeadan (Irish: Cill Mhíodáin) is a village in County Waterford, Ireland. It is 10 km (6 mi) west of the centre of Waterford city on the R680 road. The village is in a civil parish of the same name. Kilmeaden townland is nearby the village, at Old Kilmeaden.

Kilmeaden Castle was a stronghold of the le Poer family in the fourteenth century. In the late thirteenth century, it was in the possession of Sir Walter de la Haye, a leading figure in the Irish Government from about 1270 to 1308. The castle was destroyed by Cromwellian forces c.1650. The lands of Kilmeaden were granted to the Ottrington family, and later passed by inheritance to the family of Viscount Doneraile.

== Amenities ==
Kilmeaden is also the site of St. Mary's Church, a Church of Ireland Chapel, located in the north-western part of the village, Old Kilmeaden, near the railway station, on the R680 regional road towards Carrick-On-Suir.

The school serving the Kilmeaden area is found in Ballyduff, a neighbouring village, which is also home to the Catholic Church of the area, St. Nicholas' Church. Both the GAA and soccer teams of the area are also named Ballyduff Lower GAA and Ballyduff AFC respectively.

== Transport ==
Kilmeaden, lying in a linear pattern along the R680 (former N25 national primary road section), was previously home to a railway station on the line from Waterford City to Mallow Junction in County Cork. In 2003 a section of the line was reopened as a narrow gauge attraction, known as the Waterford and Suir Valley Railway.

As part of the new Waterford City bypass, Kilmeaden is now bypassed by a dual-carriageway section of the N25. This brings relief to the previously overcrowded road through the village, now reclassified as R680.

== Industry ==
Throughout much of the twentieth century, Kilmeaden was also home to a farming co-operative. The farmers of the area sold their produce (mostly butter and milk) to the co-op, and as it expanded, a general store was opened in May 1920, which is still present today as a Centra outlet.

In 1964, all of the co-ops in Waterford amalgamated, and were registered as Waterford Co-op. This led to the construction of a cheese factory on a green field site opposite the general store, and Kilmeaden cheese would go on to win a gold and bronze medal in the World Cheese Awards in London in 2005. However, production of the cheese ceased at the Kilmeaden plant in 2005, and the production of Kilmeaden Cheese moved to the Tirlán plant in Ballyragget, County Kilkenny.

Kilmeaden is also the site of the East Waterford Water Treatment Plant. This plant is operated by Waterford County Council and provides water mainly for Waterford City and the surrounding areas.

The area also has a small retail outlet in the Kilmeaden Village Centre, located directly on the R680 in the village. This building provides retail space (for shops) and residential space (rental apartments).

== Tourism ==
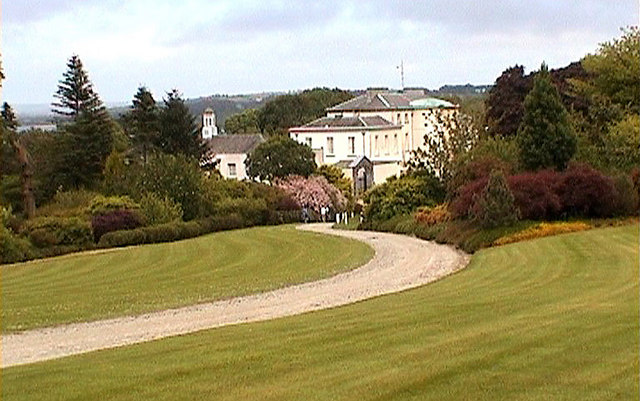
Mount Congreve house and gardens

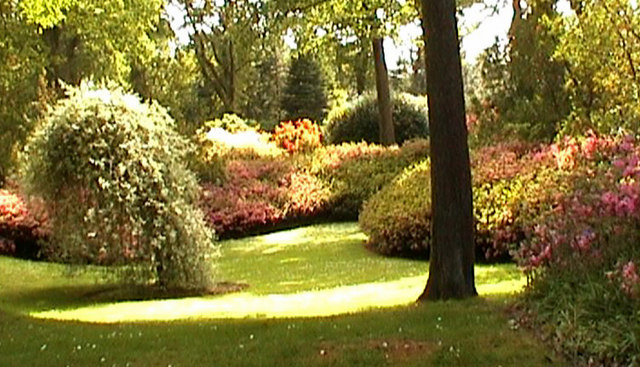
Mount Congreve woodland garden

The Mount Congreve estate lies just outside the village, on the Old Kilmeaden Road. Owned and run by the late Ambrose Congreve (1907–2011), Mount Congreve is known for its rare species of plants and plant nurseries. It consists of around seventy acres of intensively planted woodland garden and a four-acre walled garden. In addition, there are an 18th-century house (the ancestral home of the Congreve family), a number of glasshouses, more than 16 miles of paths and a wholesale nursery. After Congreves' death, Mount Congreve estate was left to the Irish State. Whilst the gardens are open to the public, the house is not.

Kilmeaden is home to Greenway Equestrian, a therapeutic riding and equine therapy centre located on the banks of the River Dawn at Cullenagh Stables. The sensory trails, which intersect Waterford Greenway, follow woodland and riverside paths, flanked by sites such as the old mill and chimney at Fairbook, the Queen Ann Way - a stopping point on the former Waterford, Dungarvan and Lismore Railway Line, the spa well at Gortnaclode and the remains of the Mill Street houses. The mill, which first produced paper, was founded by William Phair, who called it after himself, Phair Brook, later to become 'Fairbrook'. By 1824, there were 140 men, women and children working there. It closed in 1840 as a result of a legal dispute. In 1847, Patrick Stephenson bought it and used it during the Great Famine to grind Indian corn. Later he established a woollen mill. In 1875, the mill was taken over by Patrick Stephenson's two sons.

Also on the banks of the River Dawn lies 'Fairbrook House and Gardens'.

== See also ==
- List of towns and villages in Ireland
