= Ferns, County Wexford =

Ferns Fearna (Irish)
- Town
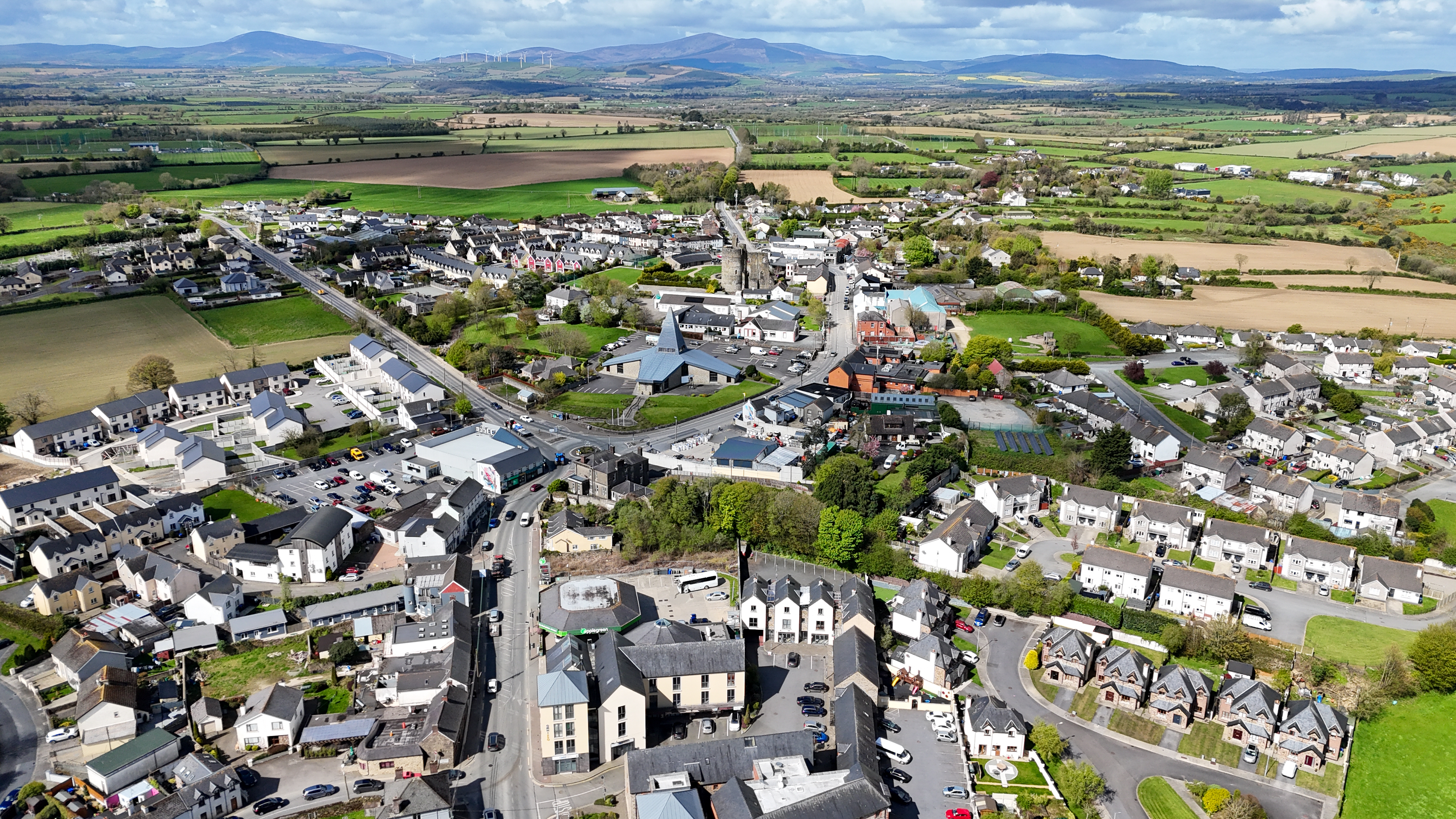
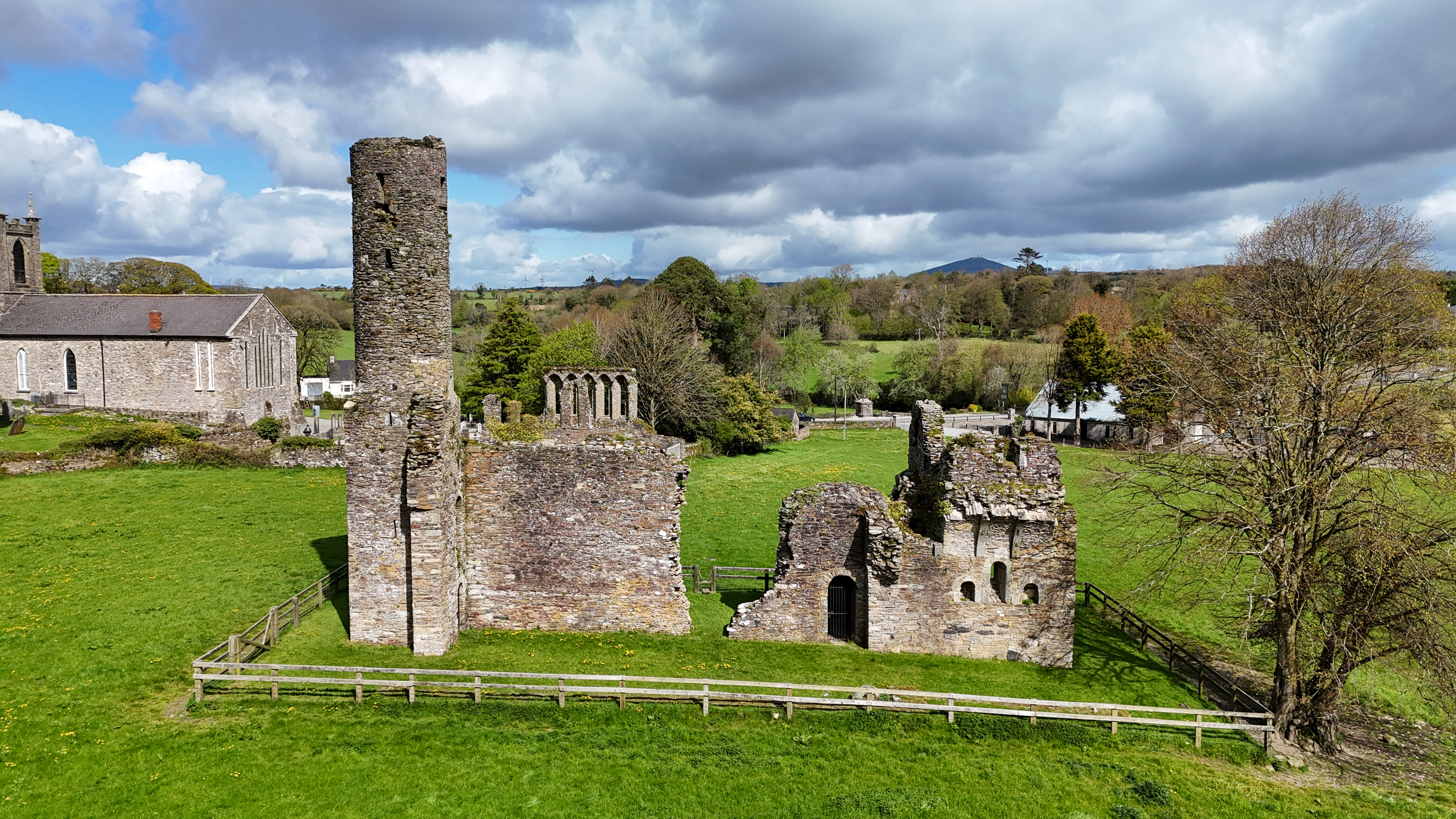
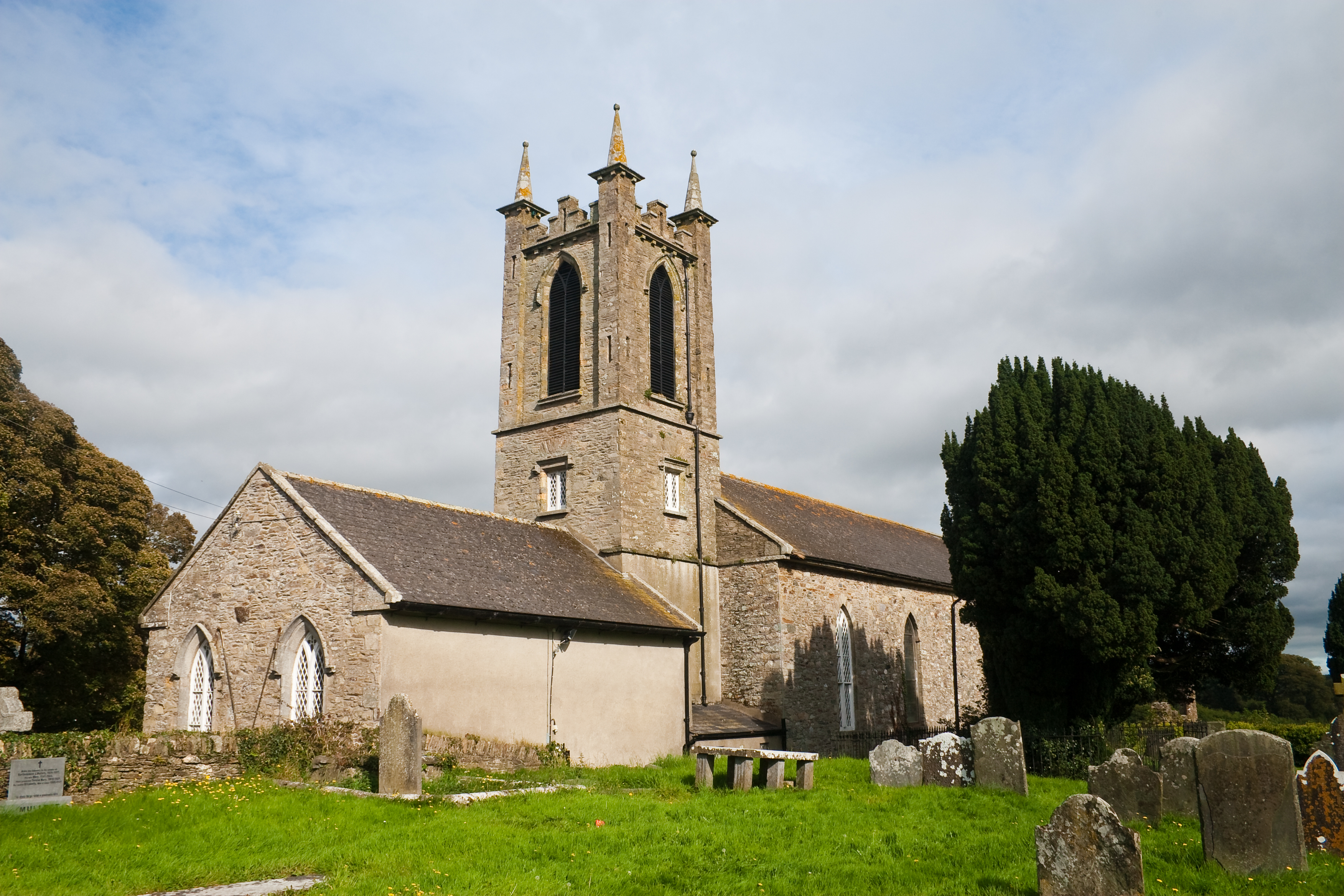
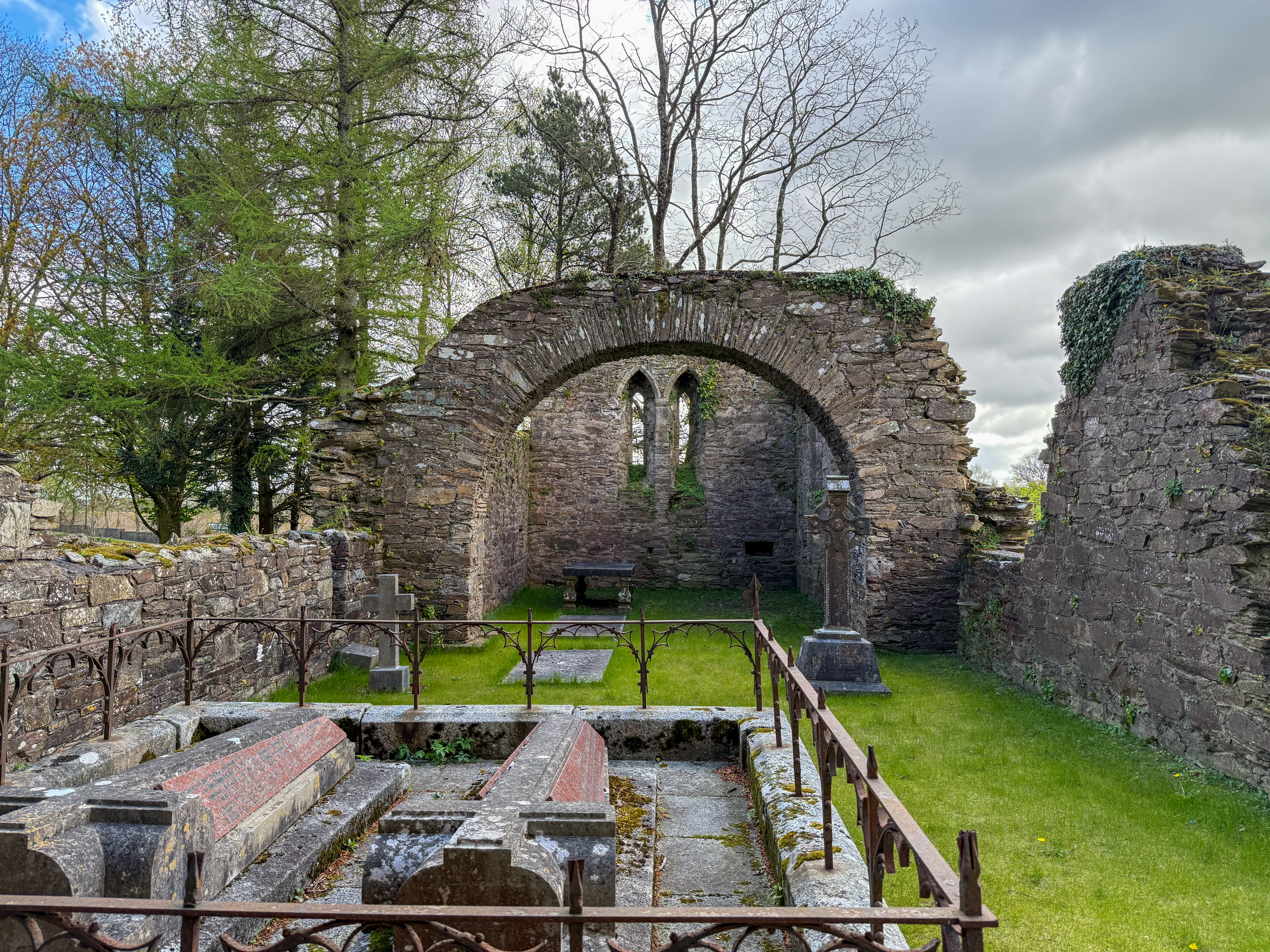
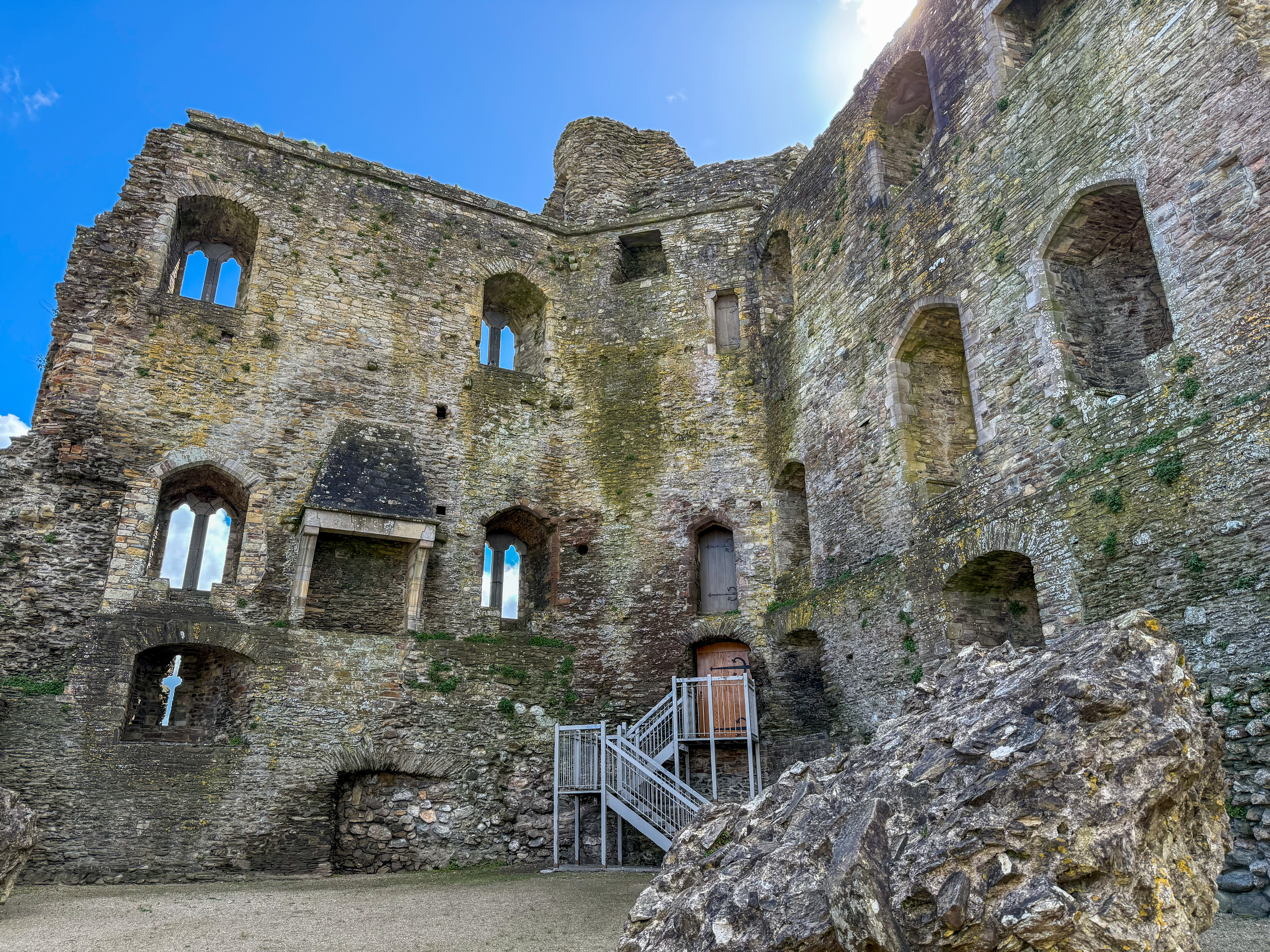
- Town skyline Ferns Abbey Ferns Cathedral Ferns Church Ferns Castle

- Location in Ireland
- Coordinates: 52°35′24″N 6°29′49″W
- Country: Ireland
- Province: Leinster
- County: County Wexford
- Elevation: 60 m (200 ft)

Population (2022)
  - Total: 1,317
- Irish Grid Reference: T017498

Historical population
Year	Pop.	±%
1831	571	—
1841	632	+10.7%
1851	637	+0.8%
1861	586	−8.0%
1871	568	−3.1%
1881	495	−12.9%
1891	517	+4.4%
1901	495	−4.3%
1911	505	+2.0%
1926	507	+0.4%
1936	342	−32.5%
1946	445	+30.1%
1951	441	−0.9%
1956	588	+33.3%
1961	557	−5.3%
1966	580	+4.1%
1971	712	+22.8%
1981	823	+15.6%
1986	811	−1.5%
1991	859	+5.9%
1996	915	+6.5%
2002	985	+7.7%
2006	954	−3.1%
2011	1,362	+42.8%
2016	1,415	+3.9%
2022	1,317	−6.9%

Ferns (Irish: Fearna, short for Fearna Mór Maedhóg) is a historic town in north County Wexford, Ireland. It is 11 km (7 mi) north of Enniscorthy. The remains of Ferns Castle are in the centre of the town. The town is in a civil parish of the same name.

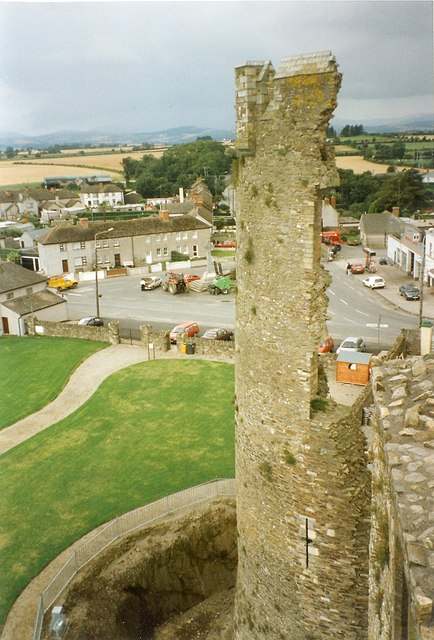
View of Ferns from Castle tower

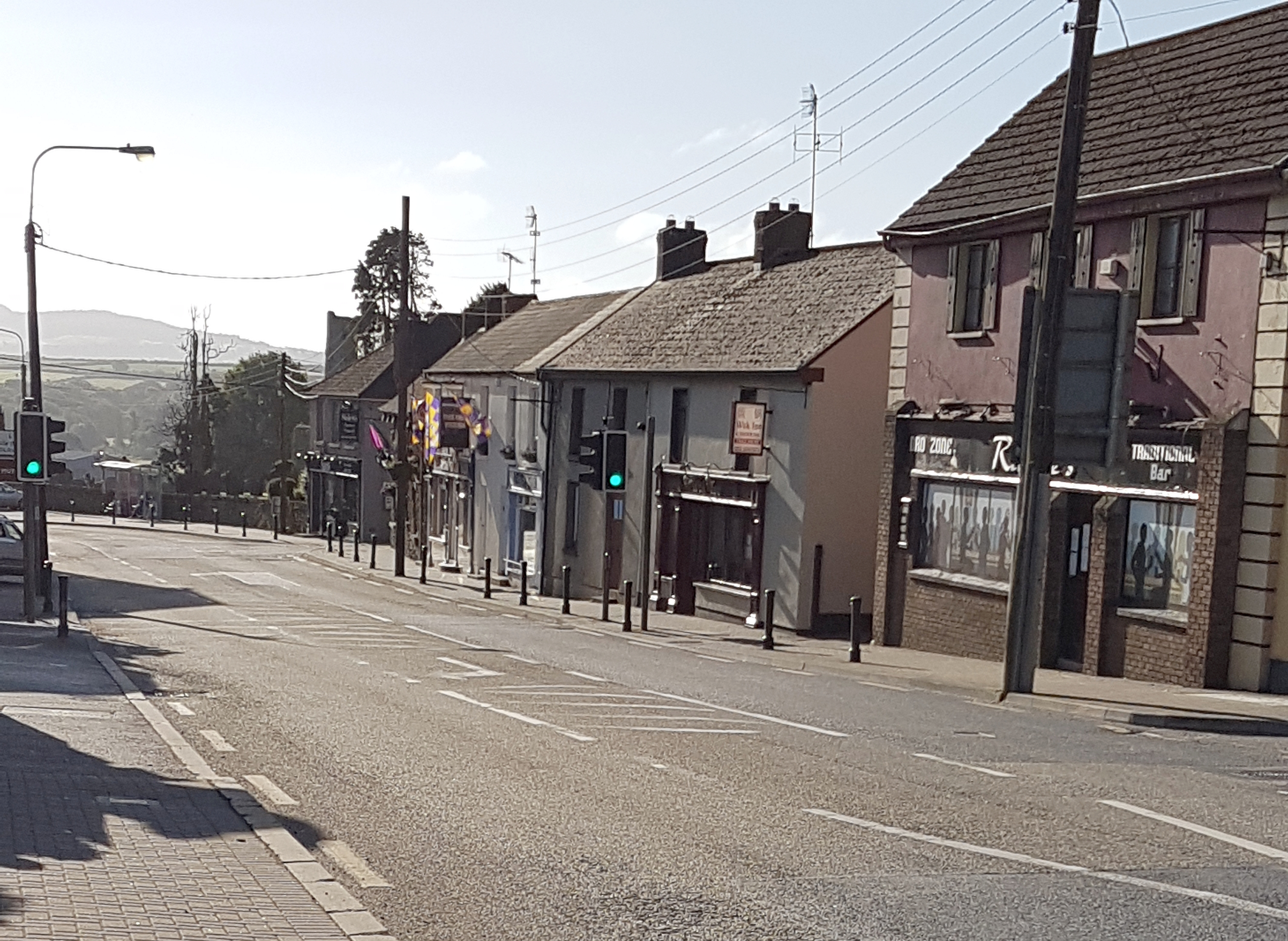
Ferns, 2017

== History ==
Ferns is believed to have been established in the 6th century, when a monastery was founded in 598 dedicated to St Mogue of Clonmore (St. Aidan), who was a Bishop of Ferns. The town became the capital of the Kingdom of Leinster, and also the Capital of Ireland when the kings of that southern part of the province established their seat of power there. It was a very large city, but shrank after a fire destroyed most of it. The city stretched all the way past the River Bann (tributary of the River Slaney), and it is speculated that had it not burned, it would be one of Ireland's biggest cities today. King Dermot MacMurrough founded St. Mary's Abbey as a house of Augustinian canons c. 1158 and was buried there in 1171.

Ferns Castle, an Anglo-Norman fortress, was built in the middle of the 13th century by William, Earl Marshall. In the time of Elizabeth I, it was granted to Sir Thomas Maisterson from Nantwich, Cheshire, who became a considerable force in the county. Today about half of the castle still stands. The town also contains the 13th-century St Edan's Cathedral (Church of Ireland) This was a big aisled cathedral with a long chancel. The present east wall of the cathedral is the original east wall; the cathedral ran further to the west, towards the entrance to the cemetery. It has been suggested that the ruined building to the east, which has a row of fine Gothic windows, might have been built to house the effigy of Bishop John St John, now on the porch of the church. The Tower and the Chapter House were added on in the 19th century. The cemetery has several high crosses and parts of crosses.

The 19th-century population peaked in 1851, but never reached the levels of medieval times. Lewis's Topography of 1834 claimed the town "consists chiefly of one irregular street, and contains 106 houses indifferently built, retaining no trace of its ancient importance". The Abbey, St.Peter's Church (Catholic and Anglican), and the remainder of the great cathedral are regarded as historic, holy places, and are still regarded as churches. This includes the abbey, which has the title of an abbey church.

== Annalistic references ==
See Annals of Inisfallen (AI)

- AI741.1 Kl. Repose of Cúán.u, abbot of Ferna, and Flann.Feórna son of Colmán, king of Ciarraige Luachra, [died].

== Church of St. Aidan ==
The old Catholic church stood in the north of the town until the 1970s, when it was decided to demolish the building. A convent, St. Aidan's Monastery of Adoration, has stood in its place since 1990.

The foundation stone of the new Church of St. Aidan was laid on the Feast of St. Aidan, 31 January 1974. This new Roman Catholic church was completed in 1975. In 2007, the new church went under a major refurbishment, and during 2007 and 2008 the parish replaced the old slates with new composite-metal material. The interior was also refurbished and a few minor changes were made to the look of the building.

A plaque listing the names of parish priests, from 1644, is on the wall to the right of the altar, beside the organ. The pipe organ in St. Aidan's Church dates from 1901. Its bellows were once inflated by hand, until modifications were made to it in the 1970s, one of which saw a new electric blower to inflate the bellows installed. The pipe organ was transferred from the old church to the new church and is still in use. Before being transferred, it was completely dismantled, reshaped and redesigned to fit into a much smaller space, in the new church.

The Bell, dating from 1911, was installed in the tower of St. Mogue's Church, by Canon John Doyle. It was moved and now stands outside the new Catholic church today, and is rung on special occasions, such as the New Year's midnight celebrations, Christmas, and Easter.

== Religion and heritage ==
The town gave the name to the Diocese of Ferns (both Roman Catholic and Church of Ireland). The town's religious traditions live on today through the recent establishment in Ferns of a hermitage.

Ferns has evidence of four distinct periods in Irish history. Archaeological digs have revealed habitations from the Bronze, Iron, early Christian and Norman eras.

Ferns has many ecclesiastical sites dating from the early Christian era through Norman and the Middle Ages. Heritage sites include:

Ferns Castle (which has a visitor centre and houses the Ferns Tapestries)
Cathedral Graveyard
The Grave of King Dermot MacMurrough
St. Mary’s Augustinian Abbey
St. Edan’s Cathedral
Remainder of the great Medieval Gothic Cathedral
Ferns High Crosses
St. Mogue’s Cottage
St. Peter’s Church
St. Mogue's Well
Monument to Father John Murphy (who was born near Ferns)
St. Aidan's Church (New Catholic Church)
St. Aidan’s Monastery of Adoration (Convent on the old Catholic church site)

== Transport ==
Ferns is on the Gorey to Enniscorthy R772 road at the intersection with the R745 (both are regional roads). The town has been bypassed by the M11 motorway linking Dublin to Wexford since 18 July 2019.

Regular (almost hourly) bus services link Ferns to Dublin and Rosslare are provided by a number of companies.

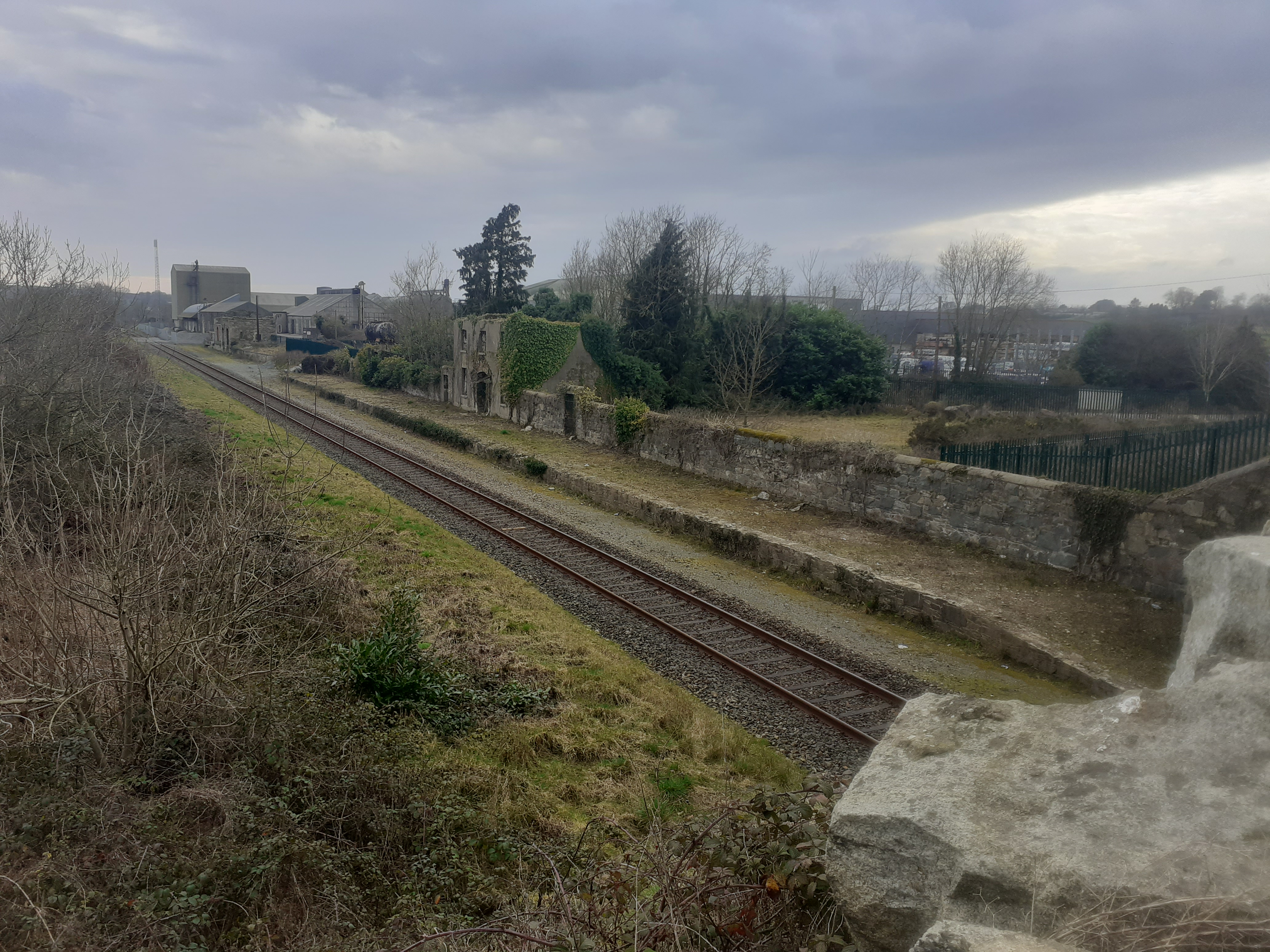
Ferns railway station in 2023

Ferns railway station opened on 16 November 1863, closed to passenger traffic on 30 March 1964 and to goods traffic on 3 November 1975, before finally closing altogether on 7 March 1977.

== Sport ==
Ferns is the home of Ferns St Aidan's GAA, a hurling, Gaelic football and camogie club.

== People ==
- Anne Doyle - former RTÉ newsreader
- Dermot MacMurrough (d. 1171) - former King of Uí Cheinnselaig and Leinster
- Gordon D'Arcy professional Ireland and Leinster rugby player

== See also ==
- Ferns Inquiry
- List of towns and villages in Ireland.
