= Mount Congreve =

Georgian estate and mansion in County Waterford, Ireland

Coordinates: 52°14′21″N 7°12′51″W

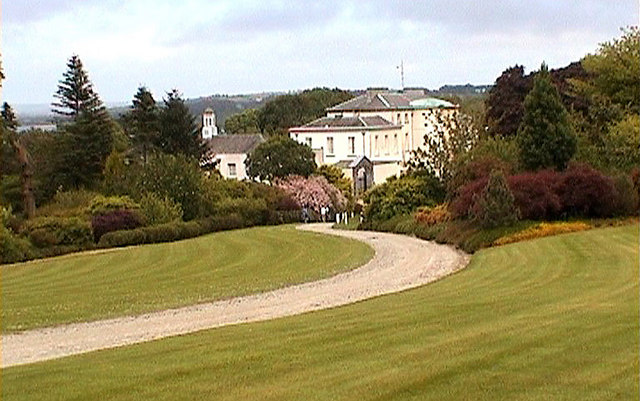
Mount Congreve house and gardens

Mount Congreve is an 18th-century Georgian estate and mansion situated near the village of Kilmeaden in County Waterford, Ireland. The architect was John Roberts, a Waterford-based architect who subsequently designed and built most of the 18th-century public buildings in Waterford, including both cathedrals. The House is situated close to the Southern bank of the River Suir approximately 7 kilometres from Waterford City. It overlooks County Kilkenny to the North.

== Background and history ==
The Congreve family originated in Staffordshire which was their principal seat from the 14th century. The first of the family to settle in the Waterford area was the Rev John Congreve (1654–1710). His grandson and heir, John Congreve had Mount Congreve built in 1760 a number of years after holding the position of the High Sheriff of County Waterford.

Mount Congreve then remained the residence of six successive generations of the Congreve family until the death of Ambrose Congreve at the age of 104 in 2011. The successive holders of the estate from 1760 were as follows:

- John Congreve married Mary Ussher in 1758 and had Mount Congreve built in 1760.
- His son, Ambrose Ussher Congreve (–1809) married Anne Jenkins.
- His son, John Congreve (1801–1863) married Louisa Harriet Dillon, daughter of Luke Dillon, 2nd Baron Clonbrock.
- His son, Ambrose Congreve III (1832–1901) married Alice Elizabeth Dillon, daughter of Robert Dillon, 3rd Baron Clonbrock.
- His son, Major John Congreve (1872–1957) married Lady Helena Blanche Irene Ponsonby, daughter of Edward Ponsonby, 8th Earl of Bessborough.
- His son, Ambrose Christian Congreve (1907–2011) married Margaret Gholson Glasgow.

Ambrose Christian Congreve died in 2011 and left the estate in trust to the Irish State. The contents of the house including the Mount Congreve Library collection were sold by public auction in May (London by Christie's) and July (Waterford by Mealy's) 2012.

John Congreve assembled the Mount Congreve Library, an interesting and valuable collection of books, many of which bore a unique bookplate comprising the arms of Congreve impaling those of Ussher. The library was catalogued by John Congreve's grandson and namesake and a catalogue of the library was published in 1827.

Mount Congreve was reportedly the last house in Ireland to employ liveried servants. At the time of Griffith's Valuation, in 1850, Mount Congreve was valued at £68 10s.

== Gardens ==
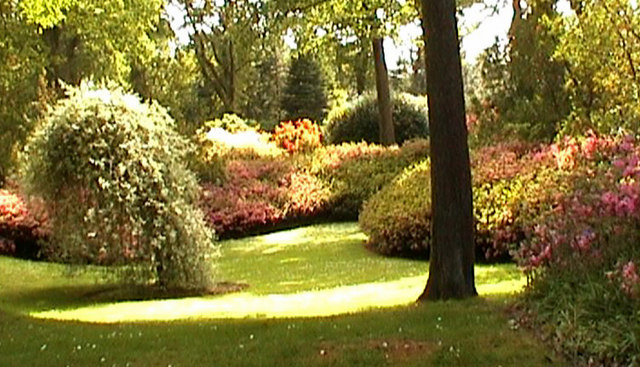
Mount Congreve woodland garden

The gardens of the estate comprise seventy acres of intensively planted woodland garden and a four-acre walled garden. The entire collection consists of over three thousand different trees and shrubs, more than two thousand Rhododendrons, six hundred Camellias, three hundred Acer cultivars, six hundred conifers, two hundred and fifty climbers and fifteen hundred herbaceous plants. It is internationally recognised for its rare species of plants and also its plant nurseries. Ambrose Congreve's gardening achievements were acknowledged by Queen Elizabeth, who awarded him a CBE for services to horticulture, and by Trinity College Dublin, which granted him an honorary doctorate. Ambrose Congreve also won 13 Gold Medal awards at the Chelsea Garden Show in London for this garden.

The gardens are open to the public.
