= Ferns railway station =

Railway station in Ireland

Coordinates: 52.5856°N 6.4830°W

Ferns railway station was a railway station which served Ferns, County Wexford. It opened on 16 November 1863, closed to passenger traffic on 30 March 1964 and to goods traffic on 3 November 1975, before finally closing altogether on 7 March 1977. Currently, the Irish Rail trains run fast through the site of the station on the Dublin–Rosslare railway line linking Rosslare Europort to Dublin Connolly.
