= Black, Hawthorn & Co =

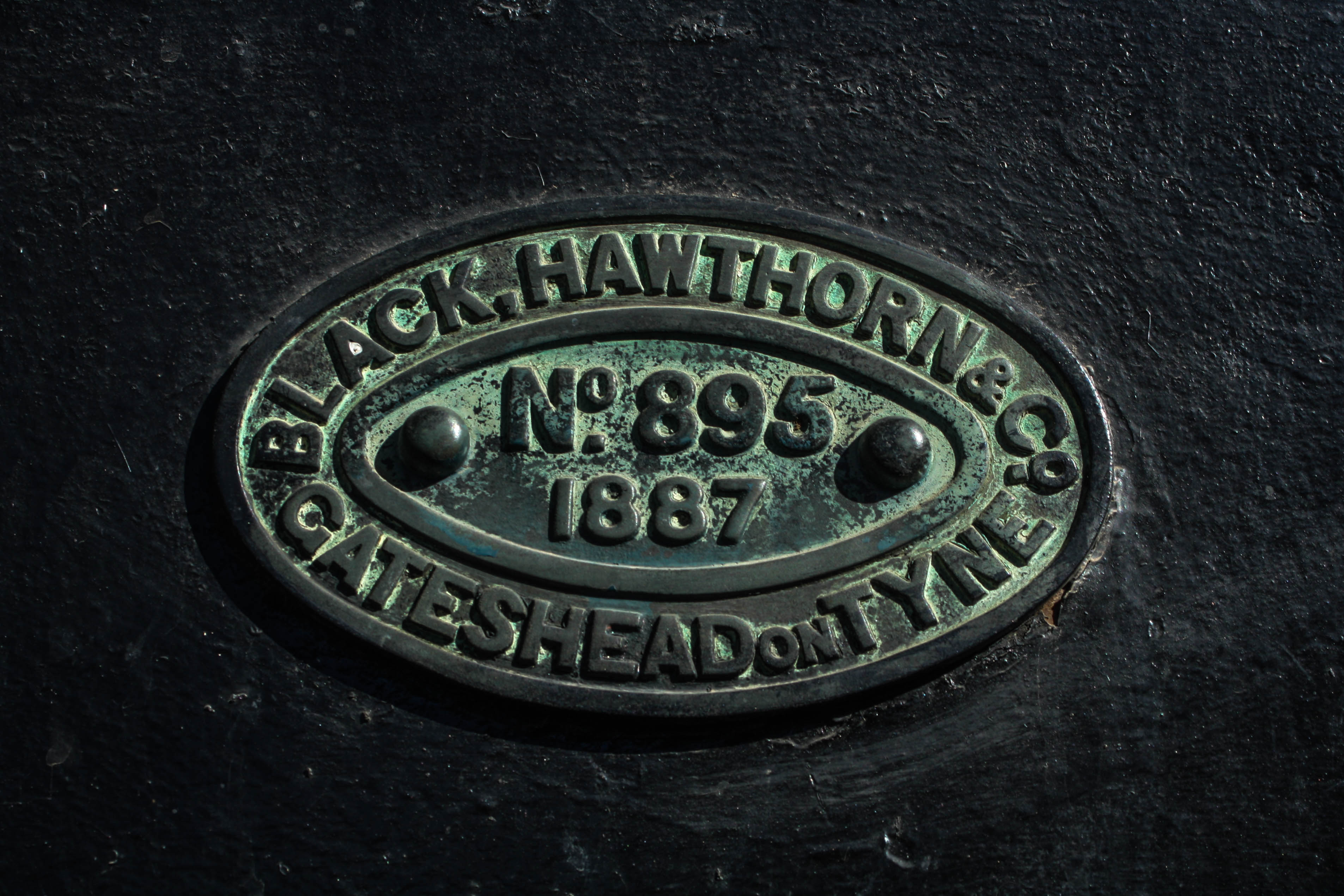
Works plate from Copiapó Mining No. 895

Black, Hawthorn and Company was a steam locomotive manufacturer with a works situated in Gateshead, Tyne and Wear, UK.

== John Coulthard and Son ==
The Quarry Field Works was opened in 1835 by John and Ralph Coulthard, known as John Coulthard and Son which became R. Coulthard and Company in 1853 when the partnership was dissolved. Their first loco was York, Newcastle and Berwick Railway number 156, a 2-4-0 to the Jenny Lind pattern. There followed more of the same and several 0-6-0 engines. Although the works numbers went up to 100, probably only twenty were new, since the company carried out a great deal of rebuilding work.

== Black, Hawthorn & Co ==
In 1865 Ralph Coulthard retired and the works was taken over by William Black and Thomas Hawthorn, who concentrated on industrial tank locomotives, both four and six coupled. The company supplied steam locomotives to collieries and works, particularly in North East England. They also built a number of crane engines. Some of the locomotives were very long-lived. A 0-4-0ST steam locomotive is preserved and is currently getting a refit at the Tanfield Railway.

== Chapman and Furneaux ==
By 1896 over a thousand engines had been built when the firm was taken over by Chapman and Furneaux, A further seventy were produced before closing in 1902, with drawings, patterns and goodwill being bought by R & W Hawthorn and Leslie of Newcastle.

== Preservation ==
Preserved Black, Hawthorn locomotives include:

Number and name	Serial No.	Image	Built Date	Wheel arrangement	Gauge	Original owner	Location	Notes
421	263		1873	0-4-0ST		Rajputana State Railway	Ajmer Works, India	
Wellington	266		1873	0-4-0ST	4 ft 8+1/2 in (1,435 mm)		Tanfield Railway	
Bauxite No. 2	305		1874	0-4-0ST	4 ft 8+1/2 in (1,435 mm)		National Railway Museum	
Portugesa (later Escucha)	748		1883	0-4-0ST	600 mm (1 ft 11 5/8 in)	Minas Y Ferrocarriles de Utrillas, Teruel, Spain	Statfold Barn Railway	Undergoing restoration
No. 3	858		1885	0-4-0ST	3 ft (914,4mm)	Kettering Ironstone Railway	Waterford Suir Valley Railway, Ireland	Transferred to WSVR from the Penrhyn Castle Railway Museum in 2024. Under restoration.
0	869		1887	0-4-0ST			Beijing Railway Museum, China	
	895		1887	2-2-0ST		Copiapó Mining	Copiapó station, Chile	
E No. 1	897		1887	2-4-0VBTC	4 ft 8+1/2 in (1,435 mm)	Consett Iron Company	Beamish Museum	
City of Aberdeen	912		1887	0-4-0ST	4 ft 8+1/2 in (1,435 mm)		Bo'ness and Kinneil Railway	Owned by SRPS
No. 1 Styrbjörn	966		1890	0-4-0ST	4 ft 8+1/2 in (1,435 mm)	Sandvikens Järnverk	Högbo bruk’s children playground near Sandviken, Sweden	

== Bibliography ==
- Lowe, J.W., (1989) British Steam Locomotive Builders, Guild Publishing
