= Diocese of Dublin =

Diocese of Dublin may refer to:

- Archdiocese of Dublin (Catholic), an archdiocese of the Catholic Church
- Diocese of Dublin and Glendalough, a diocese of the Church of Ireland

== See also ==
- Archbishop of Dublin
  - Archbishop of Dublin (Catholic Church)
  - Archbishop of Dublin (Church of Ireland)
- Primacy of Ireland
