= Archbishop of Dublin =

Archiepiscopal title of Ireland

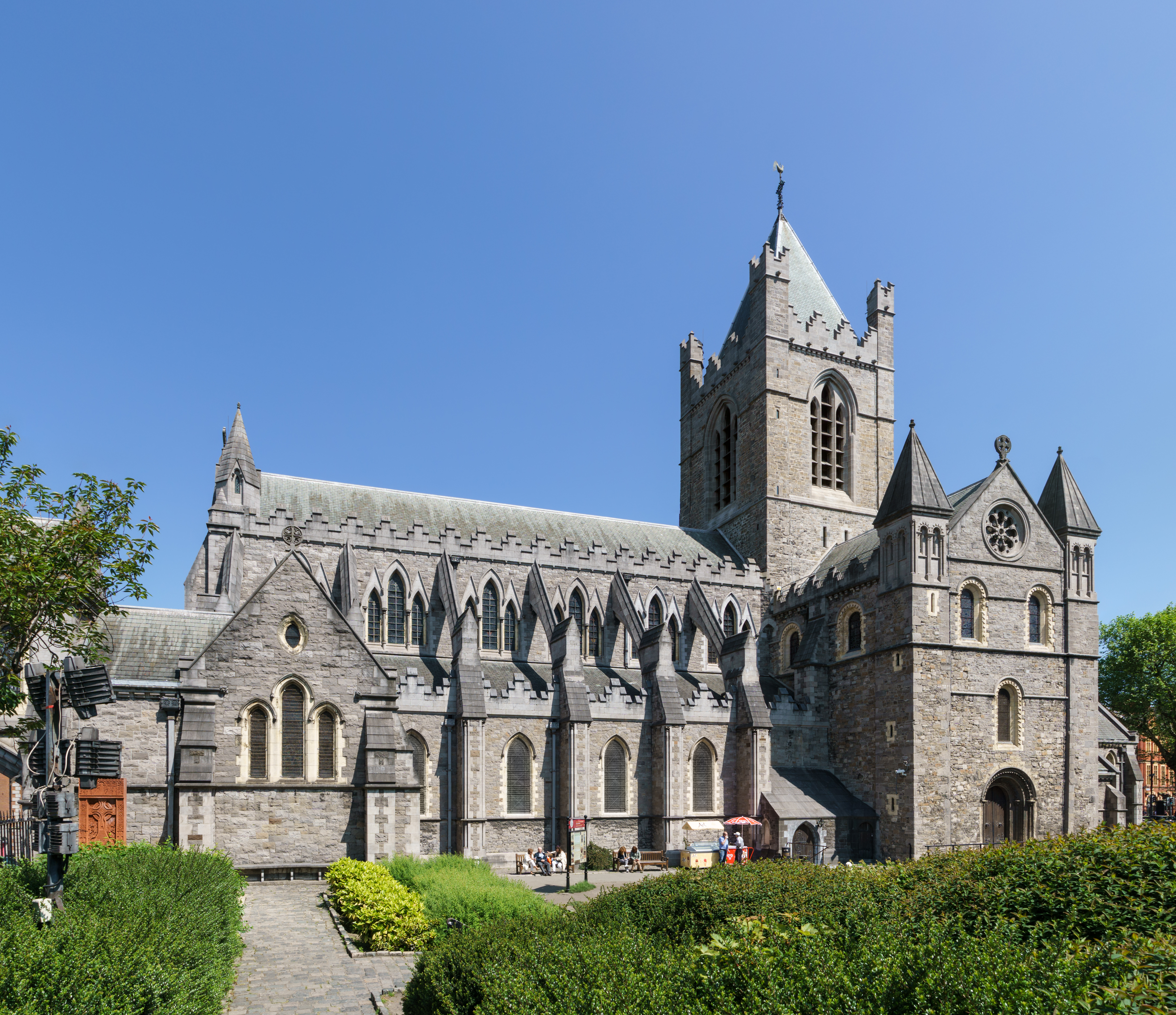
Christ Church Cathedral, Dublin, the episcopal seat of the pre-Reformation and Church of Ireland archbishops.

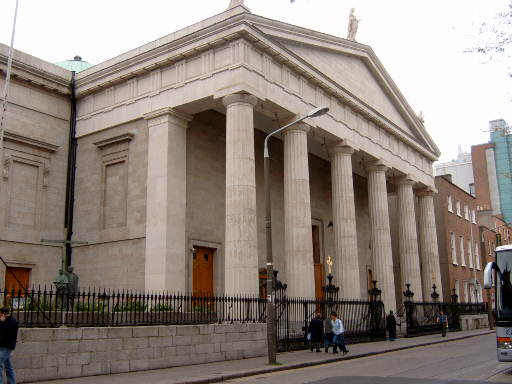
St Mary's Cathedral, Dublin, the episcopal seat of the Catholic archbishops.

The Archbishop of Dublin (Irish: Ard-Easpag Bhaile Átha Cliath) is an archiepiscopal title which takes its name from Dublin, Ireland. Since the Reformation, there have been parallel apostolic successions to the title: one in the Catholic Church and the other in the Church of Ireland. The archbishop of each denomination also holds the title of Primate of Ireland.

== History ==
The diocese of Dublin was formally established by Sigtrygg (Sitric) Silkbeard, King of Dublin in 1028, and the first bishop, Dúnán, was consecrated in about the same year. The diocese of Dublin was subject to the Province of Canterbury until 1152. At the Synod of Kells, held in March 1152, Dublin was raised to an ecclesiastical province with the archbishop of Dublin having the jurisdiction over the bishops of Ferns, Glendalough, Kildare, Leighlin and Ossory. In 1214, the dioceses of Dublin and Glendalough were united, which was confirmed by Pope Innocent III on 25 February 1216 and by Pope Honorius III on 6 October 1216. After the Reformation, there are apostolic successions of Church of Ireland and Roman Catholic archbishops.

=== In the Church of Ireland ===
From 1846 to 1977, the Church of Ireland diocese of Dublin and Glendalough was united with the see of Kildare. The current Church of Ireland archbishop is Michael Jackson, Archbishop of the Diocese of Dublin and Glendalough.

=== In the Catholic Church ===
Sometime after the Reformation, Glendalough was dropped from the Catholic archdiocese title. The current Catholic archbishop is Dermot Farrell, Archbishop of the Archdiocese of Dublin, who was appointed to the title on 29 December 2020 and installed at St Mary's Cathedral, Dublin on 2 February 2021.

== Pre-Reformation bishops and archbishops ==
Bishops of Dublin
From	Until	Incumbent	Notes
1028	1074	Dúnán	Also known as Donat, Donagh or Donatus. Consecrated in circa 1028. Died in office on 6 May 1074.
1074	1084	Gilla Pátraic	Also known as Patricius. Consecrated in 1074. Died in office on 10 October 1084.
1085	1095	Donngus Ua hAingliu	Also recorded as Donngus Ua hAingliu and Donat O'Haingly. Consecrated after August 1085. Died in office on 22 November 1095.
1096	1121	Samuel Ua hAingliu	Possibly a Benedictine monk. Consecrated on 27 April 1096. Died in office before September 1121.
1121	1152	Gréne	Also known as Gregorius. Consecrated bishop on 2 October 1121. Elevated to archbishop at the Synod of Kells in March 1152.
Pre-Reformation Archbishops of Dublin
From	Until	Incumbent	Notes
1152	1162	Gréne	Elevated from bishop to archbishop in March 1152. Died in office on 8 October 1161.
1162	1180	Laurence O'Toole (Lorcán Ua Tuathail)	Also called by the French name Laurent d'Eu. Formerly Abbot of Glendalough 1154–1162. Consecrated in 1162. Died in office on 14 November 1180. Patron saint of Dublin, canonised in 1225.
1181	1212	John Comyn	Also known as John Cumin. Elected on 6 September 1181 and consecrated on 21 March 1181. Built St. Sepulchre's Palace. Died in office circa November 1212.
1213	1228	Henry de Loundres	Also known as Henry of London. Elected before March 1213 and consecrated in August 1213. During his episcopate, the dioceses of Dublin and Glendalough, which were united in 1214, were confirmed in 1216. Died in office before November 1228;
1230	1255	Luke	Elected before 13 December 1228, appointed before 11 October 1229, and consecrated after May 1230. Died in office on 12 December 1255.
1256	1271	Fulk Basset	Also known as Fulk de Sandford. He was the Pope's personal choice over Ralph de Norwich, who had secured the election. Appointed on 26 July 1256 and consecrated before 25 March 1257. Died in office on 4 May 1271.
1279	1284	John de Derlington	Appointed on 28 January and consecrated on 27 August 1279. Died in office on 29 March 1284.
1286	1294	John de Sandford	Also recorded as John de Stanford. younger brother of Fulk Basset. Previously Dean of St Patrick's, Dublin (1275–1284). Elected before 20 July 1284, confirmed on 30 May 1285, and consecrated on 7 April 1286. Died in office on 2 October 1294.
1295/99		Thomas de Chaddesworth (archbishop-elect)	Dean of St Patrick's, Dublin. Elected before 28 April 1295 and again on 14 February 1299, however, he was never consecrated, as the Pope refused to confirm his election on both occasions. It is possible he may have served as archbishop. Later served as Vicar-General to the Archbishop.
1296	1298	William Houghton	Appointed on 24 April 1296 and consecrated circa November 1297. Died in office on 27 August 1298.
1299	1306	Richard de Ferings	Appointed circa June and consecrated before 1 July 1299. Died in office on 17 October 1306.
1307	1310	Richard de Havering (archbishop-elect)	Precentor of St Patrick's Cathedral, Dublin. Elected archbishop in March 1307, appointed on 10 July 1307, and received possession of the see's temporalities on 13 September 1307. However, he was never consecrated, and after enjoying the dignity and profits, resigned on 21 November 1310.
1311	1313	John de Leche	Appointed on 16 May and consecrated before 18 May 1311. Died in office on 10 August 1313.
1317	1349	Alexander de Bicknor	Appointed on 20 August and consecrated on 25 August 1317. Also was Lord Chancellor of Ireland (c. 1325–1343). Died in office on 14 July 1349.
1349	1362	John de St Paul	Appointed on 4 September 1349 and consecrated on 14 February 1350. Died in office on 9 September 1362.
1363	1375	Thomas Minot	Appointed on 20 March 1363 and consecrated on 16 April 1363. Died in office on 10 July 1375.
1375	1390	Robert Wikeford	Appointed on 12 October 1375. Also was Lord Chancellor of Ireland (1377–1379). Died in office on 29 August 1390.
1390	1395	Robert Waldby	Translated from Aire, France on 14 November 1390. Afterwards translated to Chichester on 25 October 1395, then to York on 5 October 1396.
1395	1397	Richard Northalis	Translated from Ossory 25 October 1395. Also was Lord Chancellor of Ireland (1393–1397). Died in office on 20 July 1397.
1397	1417	Thomas Cranley	Appointed before 26 September 1397 and consecrated after that date. Also was Lord Chancellor of Ireland (1401–10 & 1413–14). Died in office on 25 May 1417.
1417	1449	Richard Talbot	Previously Archbishop-elect of Armagh. Elected Archbishop of Dublin before May 1417, appointed on 20 December 1417, and consecrated before August 1418. Also was Lord Chancellor of Ireland (1423–41). Died in office on 15 August 1449.
1449	1471	Michael Tregury	Appointed before 24 October 1449. Died in office on 21 December 1471.
1472	1484	John Walton	Appointed on 4 May 1472 and consecrated before 27 August 1472. Resigned on 14 June 1484.
1484	1511	Walter Fitzsimon	Appointed on 14 June 1484 and consecrated on 26 September 1484. Also was Lord Chancellor of Ireland (1496–1511). Died in office on 14 May 1511.
1512	1521	William Rokeby	Translated from Meath on 28 January 1512. Also was Lord Chancellor of Ireland (1512–13 and 1515–21). Died in office on 29 November 1521.
1523	1528	Hugh Inge	Translated from Meath on 27 February 1523. Also was Lord Chancellor of Ireland (1522–1528). Died in office on 3 August 1528.
1529	1534	John Alen	Appointed on 3 September and consecrated on 13 March 1530. Also was Lord Chancellor of Ireland (1528–1532). Died in office on 28 July 1534.

== Archbishops during the Reformation ==
Archbishops of Dublin during the Reformation
From	Until	Incumbent	Notes
1536	1554	George Browne	Nominated by King Henry VIII on 11 January 1536 and consecrated on 19 March 1536. Deprived by Queen Mary I in 1554 for having married. Died in 1556.
1555	1567	Hugh Curwen	Appointed by Pope Paul IV on 21 June 1555 and consecrated on 8 September 1555. He adhered to Roman Catholicism under Queen Mary I, but then conformed to Anglicanism under Queen Elizabeth I. Resigned the see of Dublin and translated to Oxford on 1 September 1567.

== Post-Reformation archbishops ==
=== Church of Ireland succession ===
Church of Ireland Archbishops of Dublin
From	Until	Incumbent	Notes
1567	1605	Adam Loftus	Translated from Armagh. Nominated on 5 June 1567 and appointed by letters patent on 9 August 1567. Died in office on 5 April 1605.
1605	1619	Thomas Jones	Translated from Meath. Nominated on 8 October 1605 and appointed by letters patent on 8 November 1605. Died in office on 10 April 1619.
1619	1650	Lancelot Bulkeley	Nominated on 30 April 1619 and consecrated on 3 October 1619. Died on 8 September 1650.
1650	1661	See vacant	
1661	1663	James Margetson	Nominated on 3 August 1661 and consecrated on 27 January 1661. Translated to Armagh on 20 August 1663.
1663	1679	Michael Boyle	Translated from Cork, Cloyne and Ross. Nominated on 24 August and appointed by letters patent on 27 November 1663. Translated to Armagh on 27 February 1679.
1679	1681	John Parker	Translated from Tuam. Nominated on 22 January 1679 and appointed by letters patent on 28 February 1679. Died in office on 28 December 1681.
1682	1693	Francis Marsh	Translated from Kilmore and Ardagh. Nominated on 10 January 1682 and appointed by letters patent on 14 February 1682. Died in office on 16 November 1693.
1694	1703	Narcissus Marsh	Translated from Cashel. Nominated on 9 April 1694 and appointed by letters patent on 24 May 1694. Translated to Armagh on 18 February 1703.
1703	1729	William King	Translated from Derry. Nominated on 16 February 1703 and appointed by letters patent on 11 March 1703. Died in office on 8 May 1729.
1730	1742	John Hoadly	Translated from Ferns and Leighlin. Nominated on 26 December 1729 and appointed by letters patent on 13 January 1730. Translated to Armagh on 21 October 1742.
1743	1765	Charles Cobbe	Translated from Kildare. Appointed by letters patent on 4 March 1743. Died in office on 14 April 1765.
1765		The Hon William Carmichael	Translated from Meath. Nominated on 29 May 1765 and appointed by letters patent on 12 June 1765. Died in office on 15 December 1765.
1766	1771	Arthur Smyth	Translated from Meath. Nominated on 28 February 1766 and appointed by letters patent on 14 April 1766. Died in office on 17 December 1771.
1772	1778	John Cradock	Translated from Kilmore. Nominated on 27 January 1772 and appointed by letters patent on 5 March 1772. Died in office on 10 December 1778.
1779	1801	Robert Fowler	Translated from Killaloe and Kilfenora. Nominated on 21 December 1778 and appointed by letters patent on 8 January 1779. Died in office on 10 October 1801.
1801	1809	Charles Agar	Styled The Viscount Somerton (until 1806) and then The Earl of Normanton (from 1806). Translated from Cashel. Nominated on 7 November 1801 and appointed by letters patent 7 December 1801. Died in office on 14 July 1809.
1809	1819	Euseby Cleaver	Translated from Ferns and Leighlin. Nominated on 29 July 1809 and appointed by letters patent on 25 August 1809. Prior to his death he was found to be of unsound mind, and the functions of the see were discharged by the Archbishop of Cashel, Charles Brodrick. Died in December 1819.
1820	1822	Lord John Beresford	Translated from Clogher. Nominated on 21 March 1820 and appointed by letters patent on 21 March 1820. Translated to Armagh on 17 June 1822.
1822	1831	William Magee	Translated from Raphoe. Nominated on 17 June 1822 and appointed by letters patent on 24 June 1822. Died in office on 18 August 1831.
1831	1863	Richard Whately	Formerly Principal of St Mary Hall, Oxford. Nominated on 20 October and appointed by letters patent on 23 October 1831. Became archbishop of the united diocese of Dublin, Kildare and Glendalough in 1846. Died in office on 8 October 1863.
1864	res. 1884	Richard Chenevix Trench	Known as Richard Trench until 1873 when his surname changed to Chenevix Trench. Nominated on 18 December 1863 and consecrated on 1 January 1864. During his episcopate, the Church of Ireland was disestablished on 1 January 1871. Resigned on 28 November 1884 and died on 28 March 1886.
1885	1897	William Conyngham Plunket	Styled The Baron Plunket. Translated from Meath. Elected on 18 December and confirmed on 23 December 1884. Died in office on 1 April 1897.
1897	res. 1915	Joseph Peacocke	Translated from Meath. Elected on 19 May 1897. Resigned on 3 September 1915 and died on 26 May 1916.
1915	res. 1919	John Bernard	Translated from Ossory, Ferns and Leighlin. Elected on 7 October 1915. Resigned on 30 June 1919 and died on 29 August 1927.
1919	1920	Charles D'Arcy	Translated from Down, Connor and Dromore. Elected on 6 August 1919. Translated to Armagh on 17 June 1920.
1920	1939	John Gregg	Translated from Ossory, Ferns and Leighlin. Elected on 10 September 1920. Translated to Armagh on 1 January 1939.
1939	res. 1956	Arthur Barton	Translated from Kilmore, Elphin and Ardagh. Elected on 7 February and confirmed on 15 February 1939. Resigned on 15 November 1956 and died on 22 September 1962.
1956	1969	George Simms	Translated from Cork, Cloyne and Ross. Elected on 4 December 1956 and confirmed on 11 December 1956. Translated to Armagh on 17 July 1969.
1969	res. 1977	Alan Buchanan	Translated from Clogher. Elected on 10 September 1969 and confirmed on 14 October 1969. Resigned on 10 April 1977 and died on 4 February 1984.
1977	res. 1985	Henry McAdoo	Translated from Ossory, Ferns and Leighlin. Elected on 15 April 1977 and confirmed on 19 April 1977. Resigned in 1985 and died on 10 December 1998.
1985	res. 1996	Donald Caird	Translated from Meath and Kildare. Elected archbishop in 1985. Retired in 1996.
1996	res. 2002	Walton Empey	Translated from Meath and Kildare. Elected in 1996 and enthroned in June 1996. Retired on 31 July 2002.
2002	res. 2011	John Neill	Translated from Cashel and Ossory. Elected on 29 August 2002 and enthroned on 12 October 2002
2011	incumbent	Michael Jackson	Translated from Clogher. Elected on 2 February 2011 and enthroned on 8 May 2011.

=== Roman Catholic succession ===
Roman Catholic Archbishops of Dublin
From	Until	Incumbent	Notes
1567	unknown	See vacant	Edmund Tanner, Bishop of Cork and Cloyne was granted special faculties on 10 April 1575 for not only his own diocese, but also for the dioceses of Dublin and Cashel, in the absence of archbishops of those sees. Cornelius Stanley was appointed vicar general of the sees of Dublin and Meath on 15 May 1591.
dates unknown		Donald	There is no record found of his papal brief or appointment. He is mentioned as the last archbishop in the appointment of his successor, Mateo de Oviedo. There is a suggestion that he may have been the Donald (or Daniel) O'Farrell who had kept a school in Dublin in April 1567.
1600	1610	Mateo de Oviedo	Appointed on 5 May 1600 and consecrated before 5 July 1600. Died in office on 10 January 1610.
1611	1623	Eugene Matthews	Translated from Clogher on 2 May 1611. Died in office on 1 September 1623.
1623	1651	Thomas Fleming	Appointed on 23 October 1623. Died in office on 2 August 1651.
1657	1665	James Dempsey (vicar apostolic)	Formerly Dean of Kildare. Appointed vicar apostolic by papal brief to administer the see of Dublin on 17 April 1657. Translated as vicar apostolic of Kildare on 24 November 1665.
1665	unknown	Richard Butler (vicar apostolic)	Appointed vicar apostolic by papal brief to administer the see of Dublin on 24 November 1665.
1669	1680	Peter Talbot	Appointed on 11 January and consecrated on 9 May 1669. Died in office on 15 November 1680.
1683	1692	Patrick Russell	Appointed on 13 July 1683. Died in office on 14 July 1692.
1693	1705	Peter Creagh	Translated from Cork and Cloyne on 6 March 1693. Died in office on 20 July 1705.
1707	1724	Edmund Byrne	Appointed on 15 March 1707. Died in office circa June 1724.
1724	1729	Edward Murphy	Translated from Kildare in September 1724. Died in office in January 1729.
1729	1733	Luke Fagan	Translated from Meath in September 1729. Died in office on 11 November 1733.
1734	1757	John Linegar	Appointed on 20 March 1734, and specifically appointed bishop of Glendalough on 31 July 1734, an unusual departure from tradition. Died in office on 21 June 1757.
1757	1763	Richard Lincoln	Appointed coadjutor archbishop on 21 November 1755 and succeeded metropolitan archbishop on 21 June 1757. Died in office on 21 June 1763.
1763	1769	Patrick Fitzsimons	Appointed on 20 September 1763. Died in office on 24 November 1769.
1770	1786	John Carpenter	Appointed on 10 April 1770 and consecrated on 3 June 1770. Died in office on 29 October 1786.
1786	1823	John Troy	Appointed on 3 December 1786. Died in office on 11 May 1823.
1823	1852	Daniel Murray	Appointed coadjutor archbishop on 3 May 1809 and consecrated on 30 November 1809. Succeeded metropolitan archbishop on 11 May 1823. Died in office on 26 February 1852.
1852	1878	Paul, Cardinal Cullen	Translated from Armagh on 3 May 1852 and created cardinal 22 June 1866. Died in office on 24 October 1878.
1879	1885	Edward, Cardinal MacCabe	Appointed on 4 April 1879 and consecrated on 25 July 1879. Created cardinal on 12 March 1882. Died in office on 11 February 1885.
1885	1921	William Walsh	Appointed on 23 June 1885 and consecrated on 2 August 1885. Died in office on 9 April 1921.
1921	1940	Edward Byrne	Appointed coadjutor archbishop on 19 August and consecrated on 27 October 1920. Succeeded metropolitan archbishop on 9 April 1921. Died in office on 9 February 1940.
1940	1971	John Charles McQuaid	Appointed on 6 November 1940 and consecrated on 27 December 1940. Retired on 4 January 1971 and died 7 April 1973.
1971	1984	Dermot Ryan	Appointed on 29 December 1971 and consecrated on 13 February 1972. Left office on 1 September 1984 and died on 21 February 1985.
1984	1987	Kevin McNamara	Translated from Kerry. Appointed on 15 November 1984. Died in office on 8 April 1987.
1988	2004	Desmond, Cardinal Connell	Appointed on 21 January 1988 and consecrated on 6 March 1988. Created cardinal on 21 February 2001. Retired on 26 April 2004 and died on 21 February 2017.
2004	2020	Diarmuid Martin	Appointed coadjutor archbishop on 3 May 2003 and succeeded metropolitan archbishop on 26 April 2004. Retired on 29 December 2020.
2020		Dermot Farrell	Translated from Ossory. Appointed on 29 December 2020 and installed on 2 February 2021.

== See also ==
- Primate of Ireland, a title held by each of the archbishops of Dublin
- Primate of All Ireland, a title held by each of the archbishops of Armagh
