= Cellach of Armagh =

Saint Cellach

Archbishop of Armagh
- Born: 1080; Ireland
- Died: 1129; Munster, Ireland
- Venerated in: Roman Catholicism
- Feast: 1 April

Cellach of Armagh or Celsus or Celestinus (1080–1129) was Archbishop of Armagh and an important contributor to the reform of the Irish church in the twelfth century. He is venerated in the Roman Catholic Church as Saint Cellach. Though a member of the laicised ecclesiastical dynasty of Clann Sínaig, he took holy vows and gained priestly ordination. This put an end to the anomalous state of affairs, in effect since 966, whereby the supreme head of the Irish Church had been a layman. Following the Synod of Ráith Bressail, in which a diocesan structure for Ireland was established, he became the first metropolitan primate of all Ireland.

== Early life and background ==
Cellach was the son of Áed mac Máele Ísu meic Amalgada of the Clann Sínnaig. Áed had been abbot of Armagh and Coarb Pátraic ("heir" or "successor" of Saint Patrick; head of the church of Armagh) from 1074 to 1091. The Clann Sínaig, of the Uí Echdach sept of the Airthir in Airgialla, had monopolised the office of abbot of Armagh since 966. In later historiography Clann Sínaig has been associated with the type of secularisation that made a church reform necessary, described by Marie Thérèse Flanagan as an "hereditarily entrenched laicized ecclesiastical dynasty" and even less flatteringly denounced by Bernard of Clairvaux as that "generatio mala et adultera".

== Coarb Pátraic ==
Following the death of his granduncle Domnall mac Amalgada in August 1105, Cellach succeeded as abbot of Armagh and Coarb Pátraic. The Annals of Ulster notes that this was done "by the choice of the men of Ireland". Unlike his lay predecessors/ancestors, he sought priestly ordination, which Flanagan has described as a "decisive reform step". It was in accordance with the first Synod of Cashel (1101), which had legislated against laymen holding ecclesiastical offices. He received orders Saturday 23 September 1105, on "the feast of Adomnán". It passed six weeks from Domnalls death to Cellachs ordination, it has been suggested by Martin Holland that this delay was in order for the ordination to take place on the Saturday-emberday in September. Holland suggests that this may imply that the consideration for canonicity at Armagh was in "better shape" than other sources might led us to believe.

The incumbent bishop of Armagh, Cáenchomrac Ó Baígill, died in 1106. This offered the opportunity for Cellach to unite the abbatial and episcopal office, and when he the same year visited Munster he "assumed the orders of a noble bishop by the command of the men of Ireland". That this was done in Munster may be an indication of the influence held by Muirchertach Ua Briain (Murrough O'Brian) over ecclesiastical matters. The recent bishops of Dublin and Waterford had been consecrated in Canterbury by the archbishops Lanfranc and Anselm; Gilla Pátraic in 1074, Donngus Ua hAingliu in 1085, Samuel Ua hAingliu and Máel Ísu Ua hAinmire in 1096. There is no indication that Canterbury was involved in the consecration of Cellach, and when Gille Espaic was consecrated as the first bishop of Limerick this was probably done by Cellach. Gilla received a letter from Anselm congratulating him on his elevation to the see of Limerick, and there was no suggestion that Anselm felt Canterbury had been slighted or ought to have been involved.

A number of visitations made by Cellach as bishop (and later archbishop) are recorded in the Irish annals: He visited Cenél nEógain in 1106, Munster in 1106 and 1120, Connacht in 1108 and 1116, and Mide in 1110. The records of the visitations are followed by formulas such as "and he obtained a full tribute" or "brought away his full dues", indicating the official character of ecclesiastical submission embedded in such visitation. (Note: His "dues" as Coarb Pátraic are elaborated by glossing hands for his visitations in 1106: "...brought away his full due, i.e. a cow for every six persons or an in-calf heifer for every three or half an ounce for every four, along with many offerings also." (AU 1106.4) and "brought away his full visitation, i.e. seven cows and seven sheep and half an ounce for every cantred in Mumu, along with many valuables also" (AU 1106.6)) Cellach also conducted negotiations between rivalling secular rulers, in particular between Muirchertach Ua Briain and the Northern Uí Néill claimant for high-kingship, Domnall Ua Lochlainn of the Cenel nEógain. There are records of Cellach making "a year's peace" between these two in the entries of the Annals of Ulster for 1107, 1109 and 1113.

During his incumbency the priory of Sts. Peter and Paul at Armagh was re-founded by Imar, the learned preceptor of St. Malachy. This was the first establishment in Ireland into which the Canons Regular of St. Augustine had been introduced.

== Synod of Ráith Bressail and Dublin ==
Cellach attended and played a prominent part in the Synod of Rathbreasail in 1111. This synod, presided by Gilla Espaic as papal legate and attended by fifty bishops, three hundred priests and over three thousand laymen, marked the transition of the Irish church from a monastic to a diocesan and parish-based church. It established two metropolitan provinces, with archbishoprics at Armagh and Cashel. Prominence was given to Armagh, making Cellach the primate of the church in Ireland. Each province consisted of twelve territorial dioceses.

The see of Dublin was not included, as Dublin hitherto had been under primacy from Canterbury, (Note: The see of Waterford however, where the incumbent bishop Máel Ísu Ua hAinmire also had been consecrated in, and taken vows of obedience to, Canterbury, was moved to Lismore, and Máel Ísu chosen as the first archbishop of Cashel.) but according to Martin Holland, a place was left open for it, in the sense that only eleven dioceses was declared under Cashel. Flanagan however, asserts that "the decrees of the Synod of Ráith Bressail... ...had envisaged the absorption of Dublin into the newly created adjacent diocese of Glendalough".

When bishop Samuel of Dublin died in 1121 A.D, Cellach claimed supremacy for Armagh over Dublin. The Annals of Ulster state that he "assumed the bishopric of Áth Cliath [Dublin]" and adds that this was "by the choice of foreigners and Irish", i.e. with the support of both the Norse and Irish population. There was obviously some significant resistance against this in Dublin however, subdeacon called Gréne was quickly bishop by a party in the city and sent to Canterbury, where he was consecrated by archbishop Ralph d'Escures 2 October 1121. According to Holland, it took Gréne some years before he gained possession of the see after his return, but when he did Dublin "stood apart from the newly organized Irish church". Flanagan gives a different interpretation, that Gréne was accepted as bishop of Dublin as part of some subsequent agreement, "probably in return for acknowledging the primacy of Cellach".

== Death ==
In 1129 on a visitation of Munster he died and was buried in Lismore at his own request. Cellach was succeeded by Máel Máedóc Ua Morgair.

== Visio Tnugdali ==
The Visio Tnugdali written c.1149 refers to Cellach as follows: "When Saint Ruadan had fallen silent, Tundale looked happily about him and saw Saint Patrick of Ireland, dressed in shining robes alongside many bishops decked out in their finest regalia. They were all joyful and there was no sound of any sighing! Among that blessed company Tundale could see four bishops whom he recognised. They were all good men; one of them was Saint Cellach, a former archbishop of Armagh, who did much good for the sake of Our Lord. Another was Malachias O'Moore, who had become archbishop of Armagh after him and gave everything that he had to the poor. He founded a large number of churches and colleges, as many as forty-four in all, endowed them with land and rents and so allowed many men of religion to serve God devotedly, although he hardly retained enough for himself to live on".

== References and notes ==
=== Bibliography ===
- Annals of Innisfallen, CELT: Corpus of Electronic Texts, 2000
- Annals of the Four Masters, CELT: Corpus of Electronic Texts, 2002
- Annals of Ulster AD 431–1201, CELT: Corpus of Electronic Texts, 2003
- Chronicon Scotorum, CELT: Corpus of Electronic Texts, 2003
- Byrne, Francis John (2001). Irish Kings and High-Kings (2 ed.). Dublin: Four Courts Press. ISBN 978-1-85182-196-9.
- Catholic Online. "St. Cellach". Catholic.org.
- Flanagan, M.T. (2004). "Cellach (1080–1129)". Oxford Dictionary of National Biography. Oxford University Press, 2004.
- Flanagan, Marie Therese (2005), "High-kings with opposition, 1072-1166", in Ó Cróinín, Dáibhí (ed.), Prehistoric and Early Ireland, A New History of Ireland, vol. I, Oxford: Oxford University Press, pp. 899–933, ISBN 978-0-19-922665-8
- Holland, Martin (2005). "The Ordination of Cellach, "Comarbae" of Patrick, in 1105". Seanchas Ardmhacha: Journal of the Armagh Diocesan Historical Society. 20 (2). Cumann Seanchais Ard Mhacha/ Armagh Diocesan Historical Society: 22. doi:10.2307/29742750. JSTOR 29742750.
- Holland, Martin (2005). "Gille (Gilbert) of Limerick". In Seán Duffy (ed.). Medieval Ireland. An Encyclopedia. Abingdon and New York. pp. 198–199.
- Holland, Martin (2005). "Church reform, Twelfth century". In Seán Duffy (ed.). Medieval Ireland. An Encyclopedia. Abingdon and New York. pp. 83–86.
- Ó Fiaich, Tomás (1969). "The Church of Armagh under Lay Control". Seanchas Ardmhacha: Journal of the Armagh Diocesan Historical Society. 5 (1). Cumann Seanchais Ard Mhacha/ Armagh Diocesan Historical Society: 75–127. doi:10.2307/29740756. JSTOR 29740756.
