= Archbishop of Dublin (disambiguation) =

The Archbishop of Dublin may refer to:

- Archbishop of Dublin – an article which lists of pre- and post-Reformation archbishops.
- Archbishop of Dublin (Catholic Church) – the title of the senior cleric who presides over the Roman Catholic Archdiocese of Dublin.
- Archbishop of Dublin (Church of Ireland) – the title of the senior cleric who presides over the Church of Ireland Diocese of Dublin and Glendalough.

== See also ==
- Roman Catholic Archdiocese of Dublin – the Metropolitan Archdiocese of Dublin is a Roman Catholic archdiocese in the eastern part of the Republic of Ireland.
- Diocese of Dublin and Glendalough – a diocese in the Church of Ireland.
- Primacy of Ireland – an honorary title of the Archbishop of Dublin. Used by both denominations.
