= St. Michan's Catholic Church, Dublin =

St. Michan's Catholic Church
- St. Michan's Catholic Church, Dublin
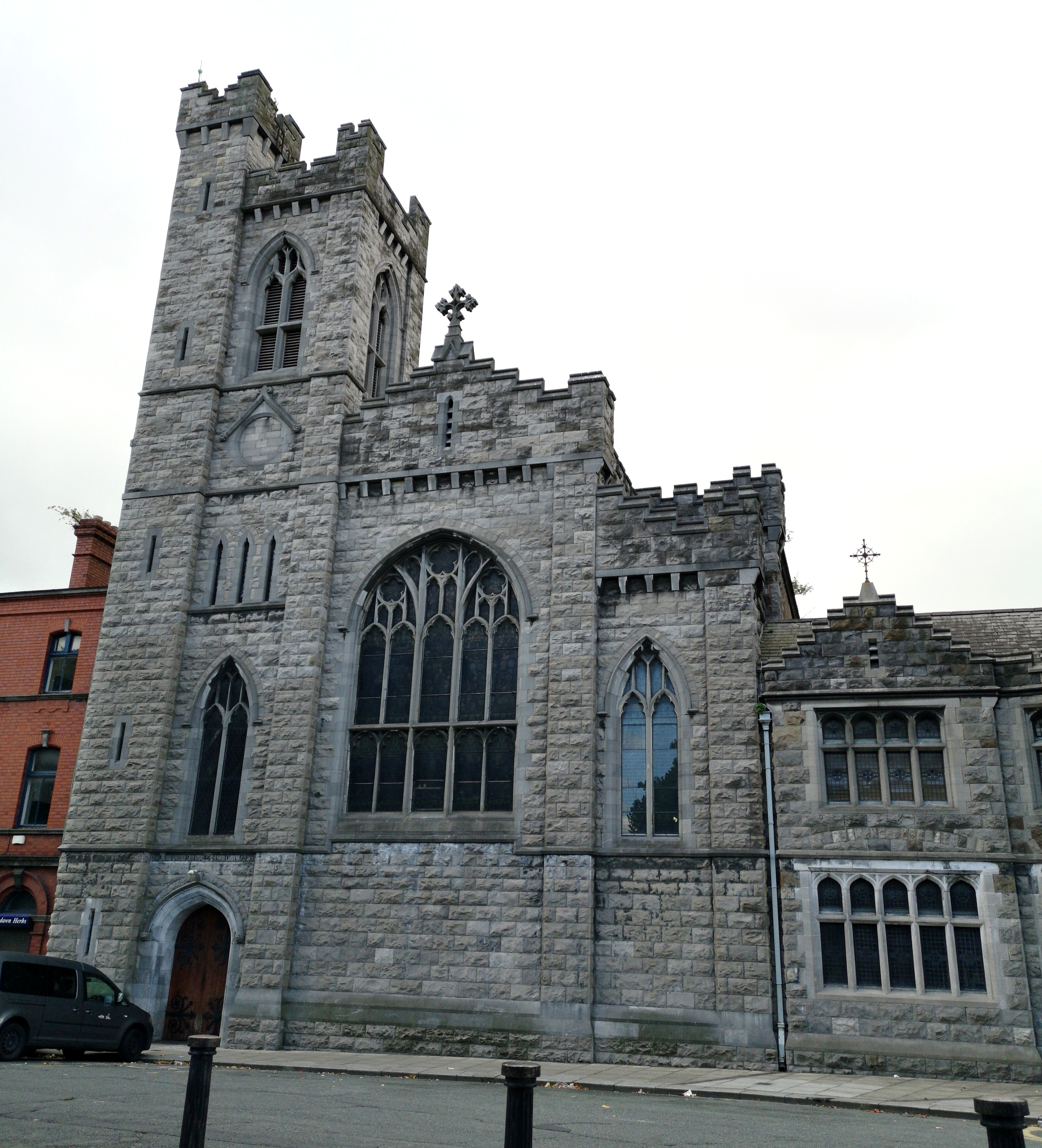
- Halston Street entrance of St. Michan's Church
- St. Michan's Catholic Church
- 53.34943°N 6.27187°W
- Location: Dublin
- Country: Ireland
- Denomination: Roman Catholic
- Website: halstonstreetparish.ie

History
- Status: Parish church

Architecture
- Style: Gothic Revival
- Groundbreaking: 1810

Administration
- Archdiocese: Dublin
- Parish: Halston Street Parish

St. Michan's Catholic Church /ˈmaɪˌkən/ is a Catholic Church located on the Northside of Dublin, Ireland. It is the parish church for the Halston Street Parish in the Archdiocese of Dublin.

== History ==
The church was built between 1810 and 1817. It was constructed before Catholic Emancipation (1829) and wasn't allowed an entrance that opened onto a main street. The presence of Green Street Courthouse and Newgate Prison had elevated the importance of Halston Street at the time and so entry to the church was through the less important Anne Street North to the west. In the late nineteenth century, the addition of a tall castellated tower by George Ashlin to the east provided a new entrance from Halston Street. The church contains a number of impressive stained-glass windows by German stained-glass designers and manufacturers, Mayer & Company of Munich as well as a window attributed to Harry Clarke in the Mortuary Chapel.

Since 2012, the Romanian (Greek Rite) Catholic Community have used Halston Street Parish for their services.

== Notable people associated with St. Michan's ==
- Archbishop Patrick Fitzsimons served as parish priest at St. Michan's from 1744 to 1763, prior to becoming Archbishop of Dublin
- Archbishop John Linegar, served as a curate in St. Michan's, serving from 1697 to 1707, from nearby Broadstone, he is buried in the church graveyard.
- Cornelius Nary, Catholic writer, controversialist, and activist, served as parish priest
