= John Linegar =

Irish Roman Catholic bishop

- Archbishop of Dublin
- Church: Catholic Church
- Archdiocese: Archdiocese of Dublin
- In office: 20 March 1734 – 21 June 1757
- Predecessor: Luke Fagan
- Successor: Richard Lincoln

Orders
- Ordination: 31 December 1694 by Francisco de Lima

Personal details
- Born: 1671 Broadstone, Dublin, County Dublin, Kingdom of Ireland
- Died: 21 June 1757 (aged 85–86) Dublin, County Dublin, Kingdom of Ireland

John Linegar (1671 in Dublin – 1757 in Dublin) was an Irish Roman Catholic bishop in the mid 18th century.

Linegar was born in Broadstone, Dublin and ordained priest in 1694. He trained for the priesthood in the Irish College at Lisbon, and he served as a curate in St. Michan's Catholic Church, Dublin. He was appointed Archbishop of Dublin in 1734. He died in post on 21 June 1757.

== Notes ==
Catholic Church titles
Preceded by Luke Fagan	Archbishop of Dublin; 1734–1757	Succeeded by Richard Lincoln
