= Thomas Minot =

English-born judge and cleric

Thomas Minot, also spelt Mynot or Mynyot (died 10 July 1375) was an English-born judge and cleric in fourteenth-century Ireland. He was Archbishop of Dublin from 1363 to 1375. He is chiefly remembered for his extensive restoration works to St Patrick's Cathedral, Dublin, and in particular for rebuilding the Cathedral's tower, which is still called Minot's Tower.

== Early career ==
He came from a north of England family which had a tradition of service to the English Crown. He may have been a cousin of Laurence Minot, the poet, although almost nothing is known for certain of Laurence's life. Richard Mynot, who came to Ireland with Thomas and accompanied him on his final journey back to England, was probably his nephew.

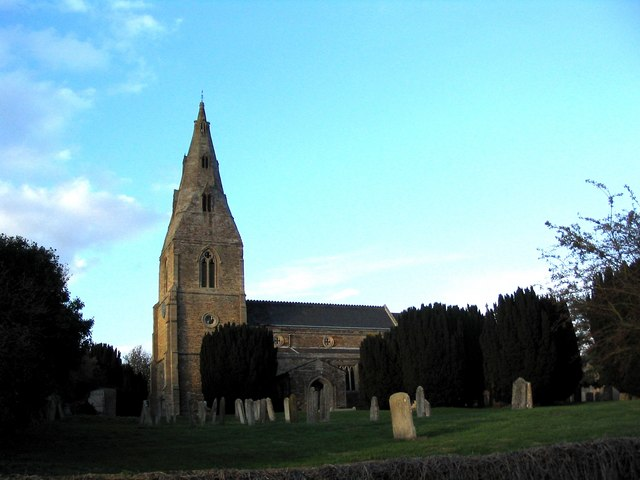
All Hallows Church, Seaton, Rutland; Minot was the parish priest of Seaton in the early 1350s

He was presented to the living of Nothorpe, Lincolnshire in 1349, and to that of Seaton, Rutland in 1351. He was sent to Ireland in 1354 as Chancellor of St Mary's Cathedral, Limerick, and in 1356 he was appointed Third Baron of the Court of Exchequer (Ireland) to "supervise and hasten the interests of the King". He also served as Chief Escheator of Ireland in the late 1350s, and numerous entries in the Close Rolls for 1358 show that he was kept busy dealing with a flood of queries about the state of the Crown lands.

Unlike many of the medieval Irish Barons of the Exchequer, who were laymen (a fact which gave rise to frequent complaints about their ignorance of the law) Thomas had studied law at Oxford University (receiving the title "magister" in about 1349) and was an accomplished ecclesiastical lawyer. He worked hard, spending ten weeks in 1357 levying the King's debts in the South-East. He was regarded by the English Crown as an expert on the Exchequer of Ireland, and attended both the English Privy Council and the Parliament of England to offer his advice on the subject. He was probably responsible for the Ordinances of March 1361 reforming the Irish Exchequer. He received several clerical preferments including the prebendaries of Mulhuddart, Ossory and Rathsallagh. He was Lord Treasurer of Ireland 1362-1364, and a key ally of Lionel of Antwerp, 1st Duke of Clarence, the King's second son, as Lord Lieutenant of Ireland.

== Archbishop of Dublin ==
Minot was consecrated Archbishop of Dublin on Palm Sunday 1363. Within two years of his taking up office, the long-running controversy as to whether the Archbishop of Dublin, like the other Irish bishops, must acknowledge the Archbishop of Armagh as Primate of Ireland, flared up again Minot and his adversary Milo Sweetman, Archbishop of Armagh from 1361 to 1380, maintained the quarrel with such heat that the King intervened personally, urging them to live in friendship and, more practically, suggesting that the matter could be resolved by allowing each Archbishop to carry his crozier in the other's presence, as the Archbishop of Canterbury and the Archbishop of York did to get over a similar problem of precedence. Sweetman replied at length, insisting on the right of the See of Armagh to primacy, and also complaining that Minot had failed to attend a meeting which had been arranged to discuss the matter. His arguments apparently convinced the King, since in October 1365 Minot was summoned by the Duke of Clarence, Lord Lieutenant of Ireland, to answer a charge of contempt of Parliament in failing to attend the meeting with Sweetman. No further action seems to have been taken, and the controversy lapsed for some decades, only to be revived in the 1420s.

In 1366 Minot summoned a Provincial Council at Kilkenny, to supplement the work of the Parliament of Ireland which in that session passed the celebrated Statutes of Kilkenny. The Council decreed that all priests should be ordained by English or Anglo-Irish bishops, should be politically reliable, should keep the peace among their congregations and should themselves refrain from any form of political agitation.

=== Building works ===
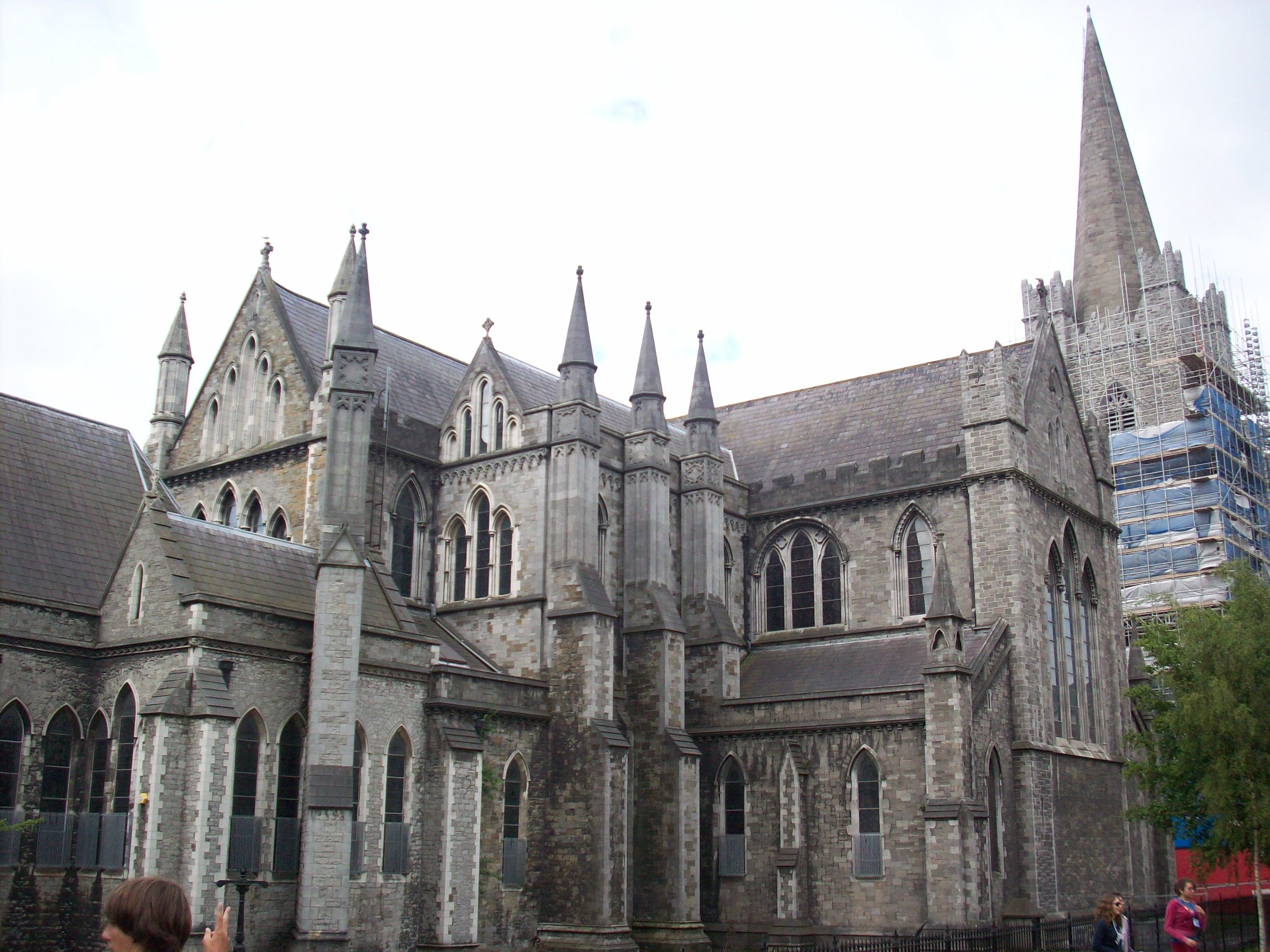
St Patrick's Cathedral, which Archbishop Minot extensively rebuilt, present day. The tower is still called Minot's Tower.

Minot was most usefully occupied with restoring St Patrick's Cathedral, which had been seriously damaged by fire in 1362. The works, which were completed in 1370, involved rebuilding the west nave and the tower, which is still called Minot's Tower. It was said that the Archbishop was so pleased with the result that he had a new episcopal seal designed depicting a bishop holding a steeple. To do the actual work he employed some sixty citizens of Dublin, who were described as "idle vagabonds", and who despite their good work on the Cathedral were banished from Dublin by Minot's successor as Archbishop, Robert Wikeford, in 1376.

== Last years ==
In 1372 through what was described as "obtuse bureaucratic mismanagement" on the part of the English Exchequer, he was fined for non-payment of debts he did not owe, but he subsequently received a royal pardon in the matter. In 1373 he was asked to advise Sir William de Windsor, the new Lord Lieutenant of Ireland, on the imposition of customs and other taxes. In the same year, he was summoned to attend a Great Council in Dublin. In 1375 he was summoned to attend another Council to consider the threat to the Pale from the O'Brien clan of Thomond. He died in July of the same year while on a visit to London. The Dean and Chapter of St Patrick's were given the requisite royal licence to elect a successor the following month.

Catholic Church titles
| Preceded by John de St Paul | Archbishop of Dublin; 1363–1375 | Succeeded by Robert Wikeford |
