= Mateo de Oviedo =

Spanish Roman Catholic Archbishop of Dublin

Mateo de Oviedo OFM (also called Matthew de Oviedo; 1547 – 10 January 1610) was the Roman Catholic Archbishop of Dublin from 1600 from his appointment on 5 May 1600 until his death. He was born in Segovia and died in Valladolid on 10 January 1610 according to some sources, or on the 2 May 1611 according to others.

== See also ==
- Ireland–Spain relations
- Siege of Kinsale

Catholic Church titles
Preceded by unclear	Archbishop of Dublin; 1600–1610	Succeeded by Eugene Matthews
