= Thomas Fleming (bishop) =

Irish Franciscan and Roman Catholic Archbishop of Dublin

Thomas Fleming O.F.M.
- Archbishop of Dublin
- Church: Catholic Church
- Archdiocese: Archdiocese of Dublin
- In office: 23 October 1623 – 1651
- Predecessor: Eugene Matthews
- Successor: James Dempsey

Orders
- Consecration: 31 December 1623 by Jacobus Boonen

Personal details
- Born: 1593
- Died: 1665 (aged 71–72)

Thomas Fleming (1593–1665) was an Irish Franciscan and Roman Catholic Archbishop of Dublin; he was entitled to hold the title Baron Slane, but renounced it.

He was the eldest son of Christopher Fleming, 12th Baron Slane and Eleanor, daughter of Patrick Barnewall and Mary Bagenal. On his father's death in 1625 he succeeded as 13th Baron, but renounced the title in favour of his brother William, 14th Baron. He studied at the Franciscan College at Leuven, became a priest of the Franciscan Order, and after finishing his studies continued at the Catholic University of Leuven for a number of years as a professor. In October 1623, he was appointed by Pope Urban VIII to the See of Dublin as successor of Eugene Matthews.

His appointment gave great offence to opponents of the religious orders, and a bitter onslaught was begun against the new archbishop by the priest Paul Harris, in his Olfactorium and other brochures. Archbishop Fleming convened and presided at a provincial synod of the province of Dublin in 1640. Strafford, the all-powerful Lord Deputy of Ireland, had no sympathy for Irish Catholics, but did not favour religious persecution. Like the Duke of Ormonde later he was prepared to tacitly recognise the Catholic hierarchy, and even granted Fleming a personal audience, although he described him afterwards in rather unflattering terms. When the Irish Rebellion of 1641 broke out (1641–1642) the archbishop, though by inclination a man of peace, felt constrained to take sides with the Confederates and despatched a procurator to represent him at the synod of the clergy held in Kilkenny (May 1642). Later on, when the general assembly was convoked at Kilkenny for October, the archbishop resolved to attend personally and take part in the deliberations.

As might be expected from his antecedents, and especially from his connection with the Anglo-Irish nobility of the Pale, he was opposed to the "thorough" policy of the Old Irish, and wished for peace at all costs. In 1643 he was one of the prelates who signed the commission empowering representatives of the Confederates to treat with James Butler, 1st Duke of Ormonde for a cessation of hostilities. He also opposed Pierfrancesco Scarampi and Giovanni Battista Rinuccini, the latter of whom was strongly identified with the Old-Irish party.

In 1649, when all was lost, and the defeated Irish were confronted with Oliver Cromwell, a reconciliation was effected with Ormonde at a synod of bishops, a step which Archbishop Fleming favoured. But even then King Charles I could not recognize his real friends, and the alliance was broken off. The remainder of the archbishop's life was much disturbed by religious persecution carried on by the government of Cromwell. He died in 1665. Until 1669 no successor could be appointed. The diocese was administered by vicars until the nomination of Archbishop Peter Talbot in 1669.

In appearance, he was described unkindly by Thomas Wentworth, 1st Earl of Strafford as a fat, red-faced man, dressed in a plain black suit, who looked more than a merchant selling cloth at Leadenhall Market than a bishop.

Catholic Church titles
Preceded by Eugene Matthews	Archbishop of Dublin; 1623–1665	Succeeded by James Dempsey (vicar apostolic)
Peerage of Ireland
Preceded by Christopher Fleming	Baron Slane; 1625	Succeeded by William Fleming
