= Edmund Byrne =

Edmund Byrne may refer to:

- Edmund Widdrington Byrne, British judge and politician
- Edmund Byrne (bishop), Roman Catholic archbishop of Dublin
