= Edmund Byrne (bishop) =

Irish Catholic bishop

- Archbishop of Dublin
- Church: Catholic Church
- Archdiocese: Archdiocese of Dublin
- In office: 31 March 1707 – 1724
- Predecessor: Peter Creagh
- Successor: Luke Fagan

Orders
- Ordination: 18 March 1679
- Consecration: 11 September 1707 by Patrick Donnelly

Personal details
- Born: 1656
- Died: 1724 (aged 67–68)

Edmund Byrne (1656-1724) was the Roman Catholic Archbishop of Dublin from 1707 until his death.

Bryne was born in Borris, County Carlow. He entered the Irish College in Seville (1674), where he was ordained on 18 March 1679. He was parish priest at St. Nicholas, Dublin. Dr Donnelly was appointed archbishop on 15 March 1707 and consecrated on 31 August 1707, in Newgate by Bishop Patrick Donnelly of Dromore.

Catholic Church titles
Preceded by Peter Creagh	Archbishop of Dublin; 1707–1724	Succeeded by Edward Murphy
