= Richard Lincoln =

Irish Roman Catholic bishop

- Archbishop of Dublin
- Church: Catholic Church
- Archdiocese: Archdiocese of Dublin
- In office: 21 June 1757 – 18 June 1763
- Predecessor: John Linegar
- Successor: Patrick Fitzsimons
- Previous posts: Titular Bishop of Aradus (1755-1757); Coadjutor Archbishop of Dublin (1755-1757)

Orders
- Ordination: 1730
- Consecration: 11 January 1756

Personal details
- Born: 1707 Dublin, County Dublin, Kingdom of Ireland
- Died: 18 June 1763 (aged 55–56) Smithfield, Dublin, County Dublin, Kingdom of Ireland

Richard Lincoln (1707–1763) was an Irish Roman Catholic bishop.

Born in Dublin, Lincoln studied in the Irish College in Salamanca. Lincoln was ordained priest in 1730. Lincoln was appointed co-adjutator to Bishop Linegar, and was appointed Archbishop of Dublin in 1757. He received the degree of Doctor of Divinity (DD). He died in post on 18 June 1763, at Smithfield, Dublin, and was buried in St. James graveyard.

== Notes ==
Catholic Church titles
| Preceded by John Linegar | Archbishop of Dublin; 1757–1763 | Succeeded by Patrick Fitzsimons |
