= Laurence Minot (poet) =

Laurence Minot (1300? – 1352?) was an English poet. Nothing definite is known of him. It has been suggested that he was a cousin of Thomas Minot, Archbishop of Dublin 1363–75. If this is so, he came from a family from the north of England. He may have been a soldier. Eleven poems are attributed to him, all of which appear uniquely in Cotton MS Galba E IX in the British Library Department of Manuscripts, London. In them, he celebrates in northern English and with a somewhat ferocious patriotism the victories of Edward III over the Scots and the French.
