= Edward Murphy (bishop) =

Irish Roman Catholic bishop

- Archbishop of Dublin
- Church: Catholic Church
- Archdiocese: Archdiocese of Dublin
- In office: 1 September 1724 – 22 December 1728
- Predecessor: Edmund Byrne
- Successor: Luke Fagan
- Previous post: Bishop of Kildare and Leighlin (1715-1724)

Orders
- Ordination: 1677 by James Lynch
- Consecration: 29 December 1715 by Edmund Byrne

Personal details
- Born: Dominic Edward Murphy; 1651 Balrothery, County Dublin, Kingdom of Ireland
- Died: 22 December 1728 (aged 76–77) Dublin, County Dublin, Kingdom of Ireland

Dominic Edward Murphy (b Balrothery 1651 - d Dublin 1728) was an Irish Roman Catholic bishop in the first third of the 18th century.

Murphy trained in the Irish College at Salamanca and was ordained a priest in Madrid, in 1677. He was consecrated Bishop of Kildare and Leighlin in 1715 and translated to the Archbishopric of Dublin in 1724. He died in post on 22 December 1728.

== Notes ==
Catholic Church titles
Preceded by See vacant	Bishop of Kildare and Leighlin; 1715–1724	Succeeded by Bernard Dunne
Preceded by Edmund Byrne	Archbishop of Dublin; 1724–1728	Succeeded by Luke Fagan
