= Eugene Matthews (bishop) =

Irish Catholic bishop

The Most Reverend Eugene Matthews
- Archbishop of Dublin, Primate of Ireland
- Church: Roman Catholic Church
- See: Armagh
- In office: 1611–1623
- Predecessor: Mateo de Oviedo
- Successor: Thomas Fleming
- Previous posts: Bishop of Clogher (1609–1611)

Personal details
- Born: 1574
- Died: 1 September 1623 (aged 48–49)

Eugene Matthews (1574–1623) was the Roman Catholic Bishop of Clogher from 1609 to 1611; and Archbishop of Dublin from 1611 until his death.

In 1623 he was responsible for the foundation of the Pastoral Irish College at Louvain.

== See also ==
- Roman Catholic Diocese of Clogher

Catholic Church titles
Preceded by Mateo de Oviedo	Archbishop of Dublin; 1611–1623	Succeeded by Thomas Fleming
