= Irish College at Salamanca =

Irish College at Salamanca for Irish students

Irish College, Salamanca
- Spanish: El Real Colegio de San Patricio de Nobles Irlandeses
- Latin: Regale Collegium Nobilium Hibernorum, Salamanca
- Type: Seminary
- Active: 1592–1952
- Founders: Thomas White
- Religious affiliation: Roman Catholic; Jesuit (1593-1762)
- Academic affiliations: University of Salamanca

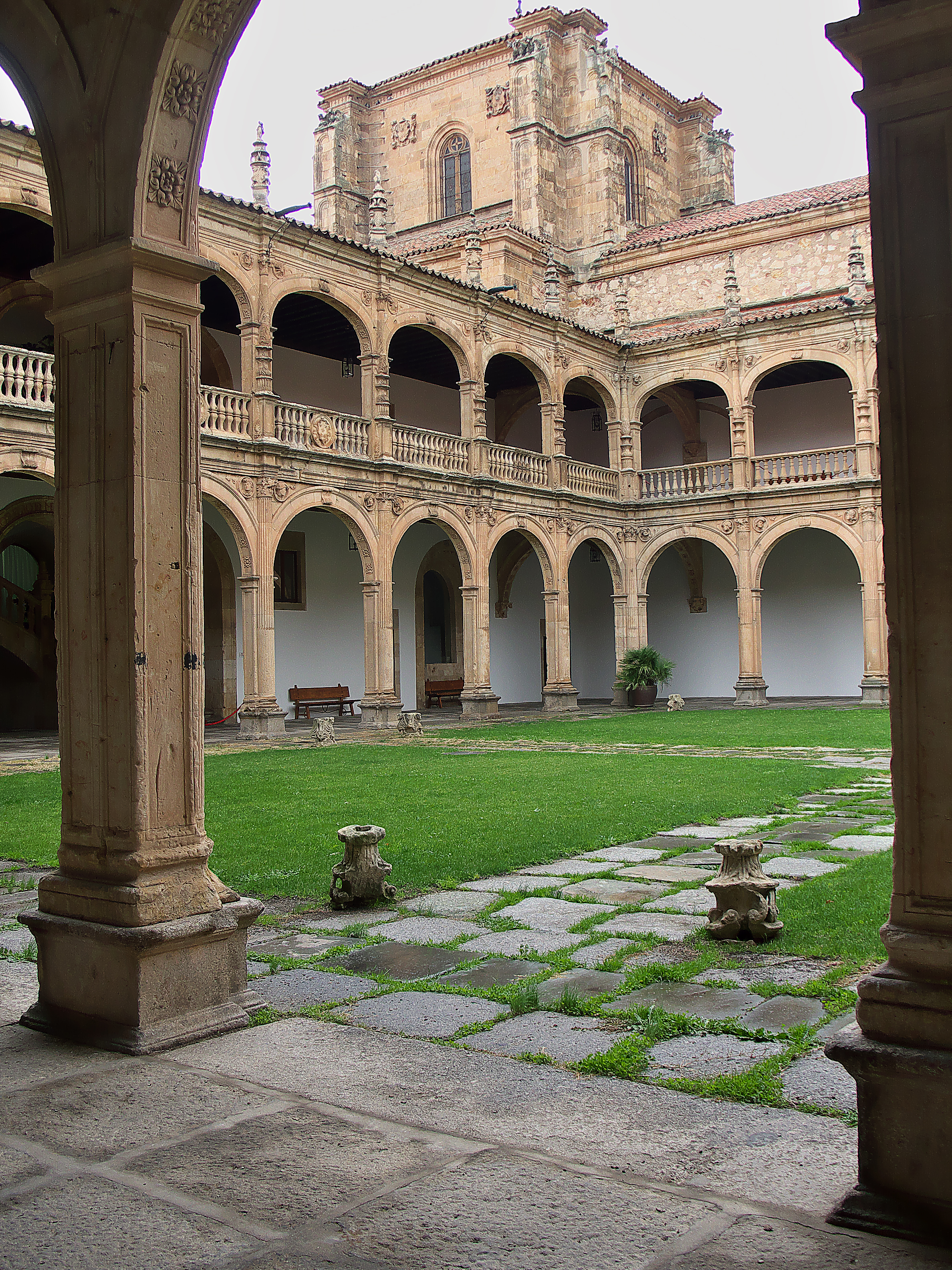
Cloister at Colegio del Arzobispo Fonseca

The Irish College at Salamanca (Spanish: Colegio de los Irlandeses), was endowed by the King of Spain and dedicated as the St Patrick's Royal College for Irish Noblemen (Spanish: El Real Colegio de San Patricio de Nobles Irlandeses). It was founded by Thomas White, formerly of Clonmel, Ireland, in 1592 to house the students of that country who came to Salamanca to escape the religious persecution of the Catholic Church in Ireland. The students resided at the college while attending lectures at the University of Salamanca.

== Background ==
The religious persecution under Elizabeth and James I lead to the suppression of the monastic schools in Ireland in which the clergy for the most part received their education. It became necessary, therefore, to seek education abroad, and many colleges for the training of the secular clergy were founded on the Continent, at Rome, in Spain and Portugal, in Belgium, and in France. The Penal Laws in force in Ireland from the sixteenth to the eighteenth century, included forbidding Catholics to teach in Ireland or to send their children abroad for education,

== History ==
The most famous and largest of the Irish colleges in Spain was that of Salamanca, founded, at the petition of Father Thomas White, by a decree of King Philip II, dated 1592. The support of the students was provided for by a royal endowment. That same year, the King gave Father Thomas White permission to bring ten students from Valladolid to Salamanca, where they were provided with a stipend so that they could continue their studies. The King placed the school under the direction of the Society of Jesus; the first rector was Irish Jesuit Father James Archer who was sent from Flanders. In the following years Archer visited the Spanish court regularly in an effort to secure scarce funding for the institution.

White went to Lisbon to assist with the college founded there by John Howling, but in July 1593 returned to Salamanca and joined the Jesuits. He spent the next three years fundraising for the schools at Lisbon, Salamanca, and Santiago. In 1596 he returned to Ireland to enlist students and raise funds. The college eventually invested in property such as olive groves and vineyards in order to have a more stable source of income and produced its own food from a small farm.

In 1608 the Salamanca College was incorporated into the University of Salamanca. In 1610 King Philip III donated a house which came to be known as El Real Colegio de San Patricio de Nobles Irlandeses (The Royal College of Irish Nobles). Upon entering the college, students intending to become priests swore an oath that upon completion of their studies they would go on the Irish mission. They also promised to reimburse the college their expenses if they did not complete their studies. The course of study typically lasted seven years. Before returning to Ireland, newly ordained priests could apply to the king for the viaticum, approximately 100 ducats to cover travel expenses. The king also established scholarships for the sons of Irish exiles, without the requirement that they study for the priesthood. The college was further assisted by bequests from these exiles, such as the family of O'Sullivan Beare.

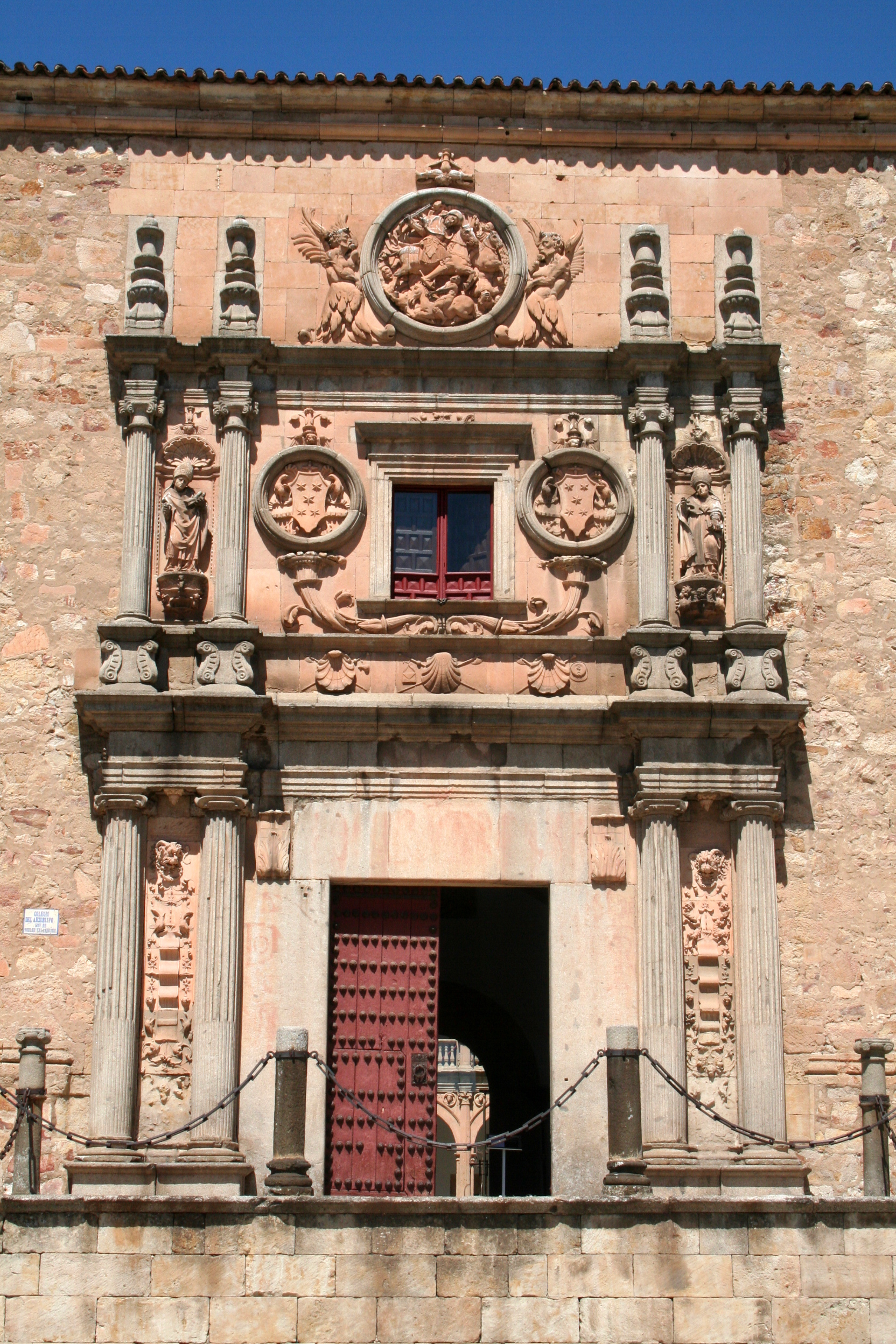
Fonseca Palace

The Jesuits continued to govern the college until the order was expelled from Spain in 1767 by Charles III. After that the rectors of the college were selected from amongst the Irish secular clergy, presented by the bishops of Ireland and confirmed by the King of Spain. Dr. Birmingham was the first rector after the departure of the Jesuits. The following year, the college moved into a building formerly occupied by the Spanish Jesuits. In 1769 the colleges at Sevilla and Santiago were incorporated into the college at Salamanca. In Alcalá, anciently Complutum, famous for its university, and for its polyglot edition of the Bible, the Irish College of San Jorge at Alcalá de Henares was founded in 1649 (reestablishing the Irish presence in the town, where an earlier College had existed), by a Portuguese nobleman named George Sylveira, a descendant, through his mother, of the MacDonnells of Ulster. He bestowed on the college an endowment of the value of £2000, and, at a cost of £1000, built a chapel to his patron, St. George. In February 1790, by royal decree of King Charles IV Irish College of San Jorge at Alcalá was amalgamated with the Irish college in Salamanca.

The college closed in 1807 due to the Peninsular War. French troops looted the college and many records were lost. Some of the students served with Sir John Moore as interpreters. Patrick Curtis, (known as Don Patricio Cortés), subsequently Bishop of Armagh, held office from 1781 to 1812 and rendered valuable service to the Duke of Wellington during the Peninsular War. Dr. Curtis was spymaster of a network that provided intelligence to Wellesley's Anglo-Portuguese Army. The Irish returned after the war, and in 1838, through the good offices of the English Ambassador, George Villiers, the town council gave them the use of the Fonseca Palace. Also known as the Colegio Mayor de Santiago el Zebedeo, it had been founded in 1519 by Alonso de Fonseca, archbishop of Santiago de Compostela, in order to provide Galician students with a college in which to study within the University of Salamanca.

In the 19th century, the Spanish government dissolved the university's faculties of canon law and theology. In 1910 the Irish students at Salamanca numbered about thirty and attended lectures at the diocesan seminary in lieu of a theology faculty of the university. The college was supported chiefly by ancient endowments, which were subject to the control of the Spanish Government.

The students again left in 1936 with the outbreak of the Spanish Civil War and the building was requisitioned by General Franco. From June 1937 to May 1939 it was occupied by the German embassy. With the opening of seminaries in Ireland, there was less need of the facility in Salamanca, which was in poor repair. The Irish bishops negotiated turning over the premises to the University of Salamanca, which now uses it as a postgraduate residence and cultural centre. Over 360 years, until it closed in 1952, the college welcomed generations of young Irish trainee priests. The college archives were then sent to St Patrick's College, Maynooth.

== Alumni ==
The Irish College at Salamanca was open to students from all the provinces of Ireland, but in the seventeenth century, the majority of them came from the southern and eastern provinces. It was made the cause of complaint that Father White, S.J., was unwilling to receive students from Ulster and Connaught, and the exiled Irish chiefs, O'Neill and O'Donnell, presented a remonstrance on the subject to the King of Spain.

- Patrick Curtis of Armagh (rector and lecturer in Salamanca)
- Patrick Everard, Archbishop of Cashel
- Thomas Hussey, first president of Maynooth College, and Bishop of Waterford and Lismore trained at Salamanca.
- Oliver Kelly, Archbishop of Tuam
- Robert Laffan, Archbishop of Cashel
- Richard Lincoln, Archbishop of Dublin
- Dominic Edward Murphy, Bishop of Kildare and Leighlin, and Archbishop of Dublin
- Daniel Murray, Archbishop of Dublin
- Florence Conry, founder of St Anthony's College, Leuven, studied and taught in Salamanca

== Rectors ==
- James Archer, first rector of the college (1593-1596) and again from (1598-1604)
- Richard Conway (1608-1618)
- Andrew Sail (1651-1654)
- Juan (John) O'Brien (1655-1661), Waterford-born Jesuit priest
- Joseph Delamar
- Administered by vice rectors O’Brien and Blake (1762-1778) following suppression of the Jesuits in Spain
- William Bermingham (1778–1780), first rector after the departure of the Jesuits
- Patrick Curtis (1780-1816), served as professor of philosophy and the first professor of astronomy at the University of Salamanca, later Archbishop of Armagh (1819-1832)
- Patrick Mangan (appointed in 1808 but due to the peninsular war served from 1817 to 1830)
- James Francis Gartlan (1830–1868)
- William Mc Donald (1871- ), of the Archdiocese of Armagh
- John Cowan, of Dromore (1879-1898)
- Bernard Maguire (1898-1904), of Clogher
- Michael J. O'Doherty (1904–1911), became Archbishop of Manila (1916-1949)
- Denis J. O'Doherty (1911–1934), his predecessor's brother
- Alexander J. McCabe (1935–1949)
- Francis Stenson (1949)
- Joseph Ranson (1949–1952), archivist and last rector

== See also ==
- Colegio Mayor de Santiago el Zebedeo (Fonseca Palace)
- Irish College -various colleges throughout Europe
