= Land Reform Ordinance =

Land Reform Ordinance may refer to:

- Kerala State, India, a 1957 proposed act, and a number of subsequent acts in Land reform in Kerala
- Land Reform (Scotland) Act 2003,
- Zimbabwe's 1992 Land Acquisition Act, Land reform in Zimbabwe#Compulsory acquisition

== See also ==
- Land reforms by country
- Land Ordinance (disambiguation)
- Ordinance (disambiguation)
