= Patrick Fitzsimons (bishop) =

Irish Roman Catholic bishop

- Archbishop of Dublin
- Church: Catholic Church
- Archdiocese: Archdiocese of Dublin
- In office: 20 September 1763 – 2 October 1769
- Predecessor: Richard Lincoln
- Successor: John Carpenter

Orders
- Ordination: 26 December 1718

Personal details
- Born: 1695
- Died: 2 October 1769 (aged 73–74)

Patrick Fitzsimons (1695–1769) was an Irish Catholic prelate who served as Archbishop of Dublin in the second half of the 18th century.

Fitzsimons was educated at the Jesuit-run English College of St Gregory in Seville, and was ordained priest in 1718. He was appointed Archbishop of Dublin in 1763. He died in post on 2 October 1769.

== Notes ==
Catholic Church titles
Preceded by Richard Lincoln	Archbishop of Dublin; 1763–1769	Succeeded by John Carpenter
