= Alexander de Bicknor =

Royal official and archbishop

Alexander de Bicknor (1260s? – 14 July 1349; usually spelt "Bykenore" in original Middle English sources) was an official in the Plantagenet kingdom under Edward I of England, Edward II of England, and Edward III of England. Best known to history as the Archbishop of Dublin from 1317 until his death in 1349, his career involved extensive diplomatic missions for the King and the holding of numerous civil and ecclesiastical offices in Ireland, including Lord Treasurer of Ireland (1307–1309) and Lord Chancellor of Ireland.

== Early life and career ==
De Bicknor's date of birth is unclear. Numerous mentions of an Alexander de Bicknor can be found in Gloucestershire records in the late 13th century and in the first decade of the 14th century. Both Gallagher and Phillips consider these to be the same man as the later archbishop, surmising a birthdate in the 1260s. The earliest mention appears to be as bailiff of Gloucester in 1273, which puts this conclusion in some doubt, though there is a fairly continuous trail of records connecting this Alexander with the man who would become Archbishop of Dublin. Whether this is a case of unusual longevity for the period (he would have had to have been over 80 years old at his death) or two presumably related individuals of the same name is unclear, though there can be little doubt that de Bicknor was already a mature adult when elected archbishop in 1310. The career of this or these Alexander de Bicknors in Gloucestershire involved the wool trade at least one point as well as extensive activity in civil offices, including tax collection, service on commissions of oyer and terminer, and service as one of the two bailiffs of Gloucester for eight different years. De Bicknor was also among nine men of Gloucester charged with evasion of taxes on the wine trade in 1287, which would suggest a breadth of commercial interests. Given their presence in Gloucester, the de Bicknor family may have derived their toponymic surname from English Bicknor in Gloucestershire (the "English" qualifier did not generally appear until later). The Catholic Encyclopedia, however, associates him with another town named Bicknor in Kent, but in one instance in 1297 he is explicitly called "Alexander de Bykenore of Gloucester." Confusing the issue, there were indeed contemporary persons surnamed de Bicknor who were clearly associated with Kent (such as the knight and chief falconer of Edward I, John de Bicknor), so the issue remains in some doubt. According to the Patent Rolls, a licence to crenellate a structure in Ruardean, around four miles from English Bicknor, Glos., was granted to Alexander de Bicknor (almost certainly the archbishop in this case) by the King in 1311, which corroborates the identification with the de Bicknors of Gloucestershire and also indicates that he must have possessed a fairly substantial dwelling there. Fragments of this structure, now often referred to as "Ruardean Castle" can still be seen today.

== Election to the Archbishopric ==
De Bicknor was originally elected to the archbishopric in 1310 by the unanimous chapters of St. Patrick's Cathedral and Christ Church Cathedral, Dublin, at which time he was Treasurer of Ireland and Prebendary of Maynooth, one of several prebendaries he held during his life. He also acted as Deputy to the Dean of St Patrick's Cathedral, William de Rodyard. For reasons which are unclear, this election was set aside (secondary sources differ as to whether this was on the Pope's or the King's initiative) in favour of the chapter of Dunkeld's election of John de Leche, who thus served a brief but active term as archbishop of Dublin from 1311 to his death in 1313. After Leche's death, the succession was contended between de Bicknor and then-Lord Chancellor of Ireland Walter de Thornbury, but after Thornbury died in a shipwreck en route to France, the choice fell clearly on de Bicknor "as if Heaven itself had promulgated its judgment". Sources differ on whether he was consecrated at Avignon or Rome, but after close to seven years, he was consecrated archbishop of Dublin.

== St. Patrick's University project ==
De Bicknor founded the first new colonial (there were many others in Ireland earlier) Irish University at St. Patrick's Cathedral in 1320, based on a charter obtained by his predecessor, Archbishop Leche. While it had some limited early success, the institution did not survive into modern times, but scattered historical references show that it persisted in some form up until the time of the Reformation.

== Tallaght Castle ==
de Bicknor founded Tallaght Castle as a means of protection of Tallaght in 1324.

== Early tenure: the rebellion of Isabella and Mortimer and the accounting scandal ==
De Bicknor came to the Dublin see during a time of considerable domestic and foreign troubles, including the continuous chafing of the Gaelic Irish against English rule (of which Bicknor was a chief representative) and the struggles between the Scots under Robert Bruce and the English crown, which frequently spilt over into Ireland. De Bicknor was one of the archbishops who promulgated the excommunication of Bruce in 1318. Among the most notable domestic disturbances was the rebellion of Edward II's queen, Isabella of France, against the King and his favourites, the Despensers in 1324. During the early 1320s, de Bicknor was actively engaged in diplomacy on several missions to France. During one of these, facing a French siege and general military and diplomatic debacle, he advised the Earl of Kent to surrender the fortress of La Réole to the French, in effect recognising the defeat of the English attempting to defend the Duchy of Aquitaine. Shortly thereafter de Bicknor went over to the side of the Queen, who had openly taken the powerful and ambitious English noble Roger Mortimer as a lover while in France. The archbishop at one point even declared that he would have challenged Hugh Despenser the Younger to a duel if it had not been contrary to his ecclesiastic position. Edward responded with an extensive list of most likely legitimate accusations to the Pope of various sorts of malfeasance in office, including his attacks on the Despensers. These opened the door to the discovery of extensive problems in de Bicknor's accounts, and in particular substantial arrears to the Church itself, non-payment of which in part led to de Bicknor's excommunication. But in the end, de Bicknor had chosen the winning side, and Edward was forced to abdicate in 1327 in favour of his son Edward III, at the time still controlled by Isabella and Mortimer. The former king is thought to have been executed under uncertain circumstances later in the same year. In the late 1320s, the darkest period of de Bicknor's career began to unfold, when further accounting fraud during his administration was uncovered, or at least ceased to be tolerated. Walter de Islip, the Lord Treasurer of Ireland, was also deeply implicated in the fraud. If de Bicknor had expected his support for the new regime to excuse him, he was disappointed, as his assets and holdings were seized by the crown. After this point, de Bicknor's role in national politics diminished substantially. His difficulties became only deeper when he apparently attempted to falsify a royal pardon (ironically, for the crime of fraud). When Edward III came of age in 1330, he had Mortimer brutally executed and Isabella was forced to live out the rest of her life under what was, in essence, house arrest, so de Bicknor's fate was relatively mild compared to that of his erstwhile patrons and allies. More remarkably, he eventually obtained an authentic pardon from Edward III. He visited England in 1332, possibly in connection with the pardon.

== Later ecclesiastical disputes ==
De Bicknor's later tenure as Archbishop after the accession of Edward III was also plagued by disputes, though of a less mortal nature. In particular, de Bicknor conducted a protracted feud with the Bishop of Ossory, Richard de Ledrede, best remembered for his role in the Kilkenny Witch Trials. He also engaged in an acrimonious dispute with the Prior of Kilmainham over the disputed possession of a church. The long-standing dispute over the Primacy of All Ireland between the Archbishop of Dublin and the Archbishop of Armagh also flared up periodically, and in 1349 Archbishop Richard FitzRalph of Armagh entered Dublin to assert his primacy, causing a considerable stir.

== De Bicknor genealogy ==
The genealogist Gustav Anjou claimed, based on uncertain sources, that the de Bicknor surname eventually evolved into the modern English surname Buckner, but this claim is doubtful and Anjou's reputation for flattering patrons with dubious claims of distinguished medieval ancestry casts further doubt upon it. There is also a reference to a niece of Alexander de Bicknor named Margery on whom he settled the manor of Ruardean in 1311 at her marriage to Geoffrey of Langley.

Catholic Church titles
Preceded by John de Leche	Archbishop of Dublin; 1317–1349	Succeeded by John de St Paul

== Bibliography ==
- Deputy Keeper of the Records, ed. (1895), Calendar of the Patent Rolls, Edward, vol. I 1292–1301, London: Eyre and Spottiswoode, archived from the original on 16 December 2007
- Deputy Keeper of the Records, ed. (1894), Calendar of the Patent Rolls, Edward, vol. II 1307–1313, London: Eyre and Spottiswoode, archived from the original on 16 December 2007
- Birt, Norbert Henry (1907), Lafort, Remy (ed.), The Catholic Encyclopedia, vol. II, New York: Robert Appleton Company
- Davis, Philip (2007). "Ruardean Castle". Gatehouse: The comprehensive gazetteer of the medieval fortifications and castles of England and Wales.
- Gallagher, Niav (1997). "The Audit of Alexander Bicknor's Accounts". PaGes – Arts Postgraduate Research in Progress, University College Dublin.
- "Gloucester: Bailiffs, 1200–1483". History of the County of Gloucester: Volume 4: The City of Gloucester. 1988.
- "Medieval Gloucester: Trade and Industry 1066–1327". A History of the County of Gloucester: Volume 4: The City of Gloucester. 1988.
- Parker, John Henry (1860), Urban, Sylvanus (ed.), "Medieval Houses of Gloucestershire", The Gentleman's Magazine and Historical Review, IX: 335–354
- Phillips, J. R. S. "Bicknor, Alexander". Oxford Dictionary of National Biography (online ed.). Oxford University Press. doi:10.1093/ref:odnb/2359. (Subscription, Wikipedia Library access or UK public library membership required.)
- Prestwich, Michael (1997), Edward I, Yale English Monarchs, New Haven and London: Yale University Press, ISBN 0-300-07157-4
- "Ruardean". A History of the County of Gloucester: Volume 5: Bledisloe Hundred, St. Briavels Hundred, The Forest of Dean. 1996. Archived from the original on 27 September 2007.
- Hunt, William (1886). "Bicknor, Alexander" . In Stephen, Leslie (ed.). Dictionary of National Biography. Vol. 5. London: Smith, Elder & Co. pp. 11–12.
- Sumption, Jonathan (1999), Hundred Years' War, 1339–1453, Univ of Pennsylvania Press, ISBN 0-8122-1655-5
- Walsh, Thomas (1854), History of the Irish Hierarchy, New York: D.&J.Sadlier and Co.

Catholic Church titles
Preceded by John de Leche	Archbishop of Dublin; 1317–1349	Succeeded by John de St Paul
