= John de St Paul =

Lord Chancellor of Ireland and Roman Catholic Archbishop

John de St Paul (c. 1295 – 1362), also known as John de St. Pol, John de Owston and John de Ouston, was an English-born cleric and judge of the fourteenth century. He was Archbishop of Dublin 1349–62 and Lord Chancellor of Ireland 1350–56. He had previously been Master of the Rolls in England 1337–40. Apart from a brief period of disgrace in 1340, he enjoyed the confidence of King Edward III. He was described as a zealous supporter of English rule in Ireland, but also as a pragmatic statesman who was willing to conciliate the Anglo-Irish ruling class. He did much to enlarge and beautify Christ Church, Dublin, although virtually no trace of his improvements survive, as they were destroyed by the Victorian rebuilding of the cathedral.

== Family and early life ==
The St Paul family is thought to have come to Yorkshire from Guienne. They may have had a family connection to the Counts of Saint-Pol, since Marie de St Pol, Countess of Pembroke, often employed John as her attorney.

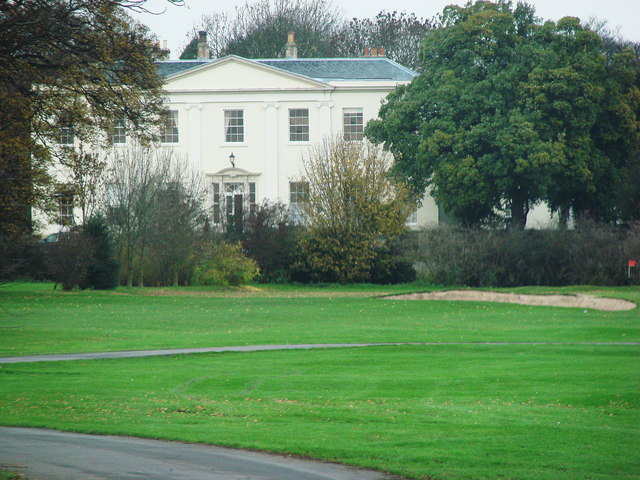
Owston, South Yorkshire, where the Archbishop was born in about 1295

John de St Paul was born about 1295, probably at Owston, West Riding of Yorkshire. He was most likely the son of Thomas de St Paul, and brother to Robert de St Paul, lord of the manor of Byram cum Sutton. He had at least one other brother, William, and later employed a chaplain to celebrate private Masses for William, John himself and other members of the family. He was said by some to be illegitimate, and thought it prudent to obtain a papal dispensation absolving him from the various legal disabilities attached to that status, although the claim of his illegitimate birth was later contradicted by no less an authority than Pope Benedict XII himself, who stated that St. Paul's parents had been lawfully married by a curate in private.

== Early career ==
He was appointed a clerk in the English Chancery in around 1318, and became rector of Ashby David in Lincoln in 1329, the first of numerous clerical benefices he was to receive, of which the most important was Archdeacon of Cornwall. From 1334 he was regularly appointed guardian of the Great Seal in the absence of the Lord Chancellor and in 1337 he became Master of the Rolls. He was granted a house in Chancery Lane in the city of London in 1339. He was briefly Lord Keeper of the Great Seal in 1339.

== Disgrace ==
In 1340 King Edward III, while engaged in the Siege of Tournai, received numerous complaints of acts of corruption and maladministration committed by his officials. He returned to England with great speed, and dismissed most of the officials accused, including St Paul, who was imprisoned and deprived of the Mastership of the Rolls. After a personal plea for clemency on his behalf by the Archbishop of Canterbury, John de Stratford, St Paul was released from custody, but he was not restored to the Mastership of the Rolls, although he was allowed to hold the lesser office of Master in Chancery.

== Archbishop of Dublin ==
In 1349 he was made Archbishop of Dublin. He was granted the manor of Swords, County Dublin, which was traditionally granted to the Archbishop for life, and successfully claimed the port of Rogerstown (of which only Rogerstown Estuary remains) as part of it. He received a commission from Pope Clement VI to proceed against certain heretics who, having fled from persecution by Richard de Ledrede, the notoriously stern Bishop of Ossory, had been sheltered by St Paul's predecessor in the See of Dublin, Alexander de Bicknor. He held a Synod in Dublin in 1351, which dealt with a wide range of issues, including the proper observance of Good Friday, the banning of secret marriages, and the ritual of genuflection. He maintained the long-running dispute with Richard FitzRalph, Archbishop of Armagh over the latter's claim to be Primate of Ireland. He persuaded the King to revoke his order which gave the See of Armagh precedence, and to remove the cause to Rome for the Pope's adjudication. He obtained numerous benefits for the Archdiocese of Dublin. His extensive additions to Christ Church Cathedral, which he undertook at his own expense, included the "quire", or long choir (1358) and the new organ. Most of his innovations, including the "long quire", were destroyed in the 1870s, when the interior of the cathedral was altered beyond recognition.

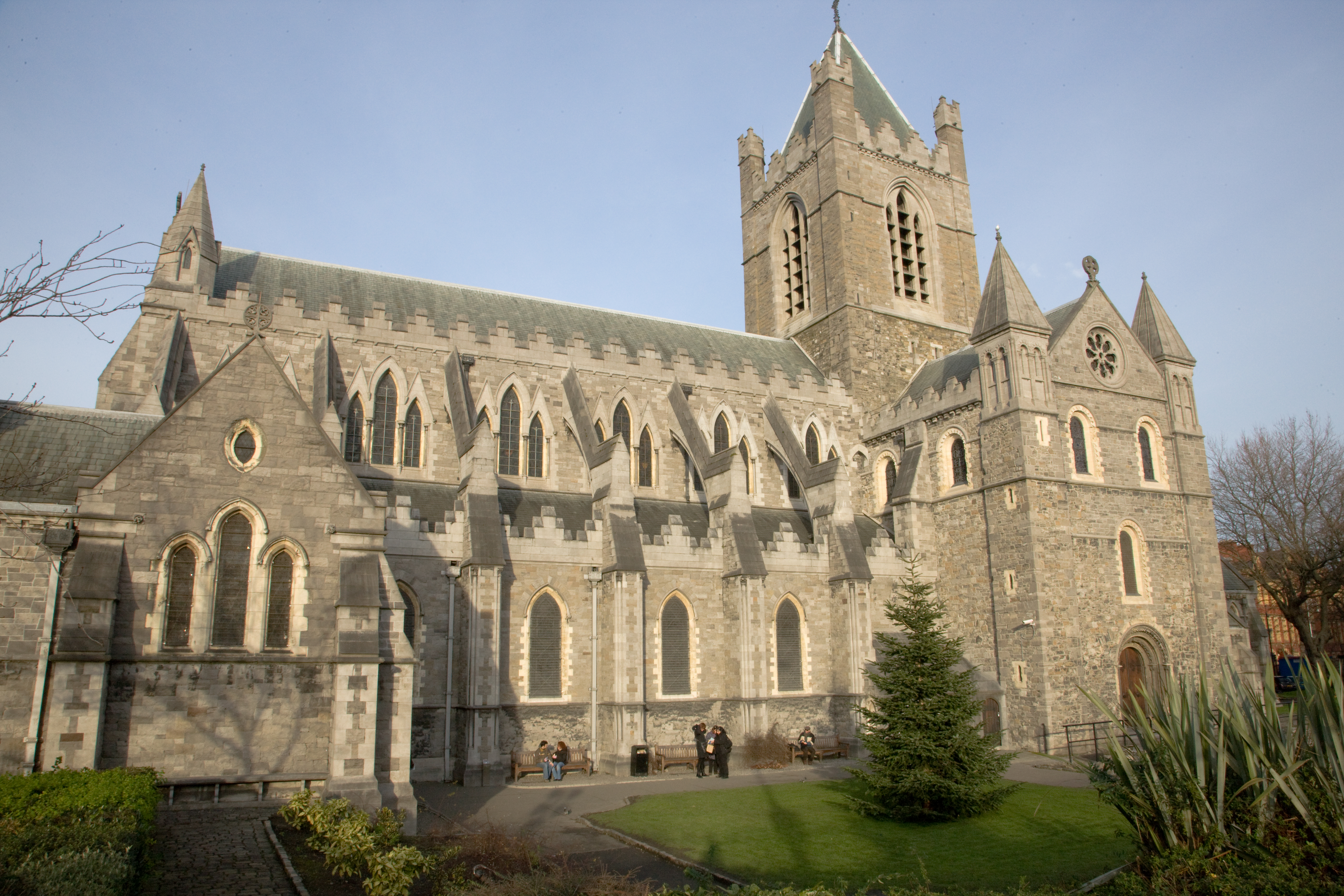
Christchurch Cathedral: Archbishop de St Paul built the choir and installed the organ. He is buried under the high altar. Almost no traces of his work survive today.

== Chancellor and statesman ==
He was Lord Chancellor of Ireland, with one brief interval, from 1350 to 1356. In 1358 he was appointed to the Privy Council of Ireland, and the Lord Deputy of Ireland was instructed to pay great heed to his advice. The Close Rolls for 1357 show that he was engaged in litigation over a claim by the Exchequer of Ireland that all lands granted to the Archdiocese were liable to be levied for fines in the usual way, whereas he claimed that as the Archbishop's personal property, they were exempt. He sat on a Royal Commission to explore for and oversee gold and silver mines in 1360.

In 1361 he was summoned to a Great Council in Dublin: although he was a strong supporter of English rule in Ireland, he urged a policy of moderation and an end to the bitter divisions of the past decade within the government itself. His proposals included an amnesty for Anglo-Irish leaders who had been in opposition to the Crown, which was duly granted. He also advised that the gentry of the Pale should be required to live permanently on their estates and fortify their homes.

== Death ==
He died on 9 September 1362 and was buried under the high altar in Christ Church Cathedral – a building which he had done so much to improve at his own expense.

Catholic Church titles
Preceded by Alexander de Bicknor	Archbishop of Dublin; 1349–1362	Succeeded by Thomas Minot
