= Anne Street North =

Street in Dublin, Ireland

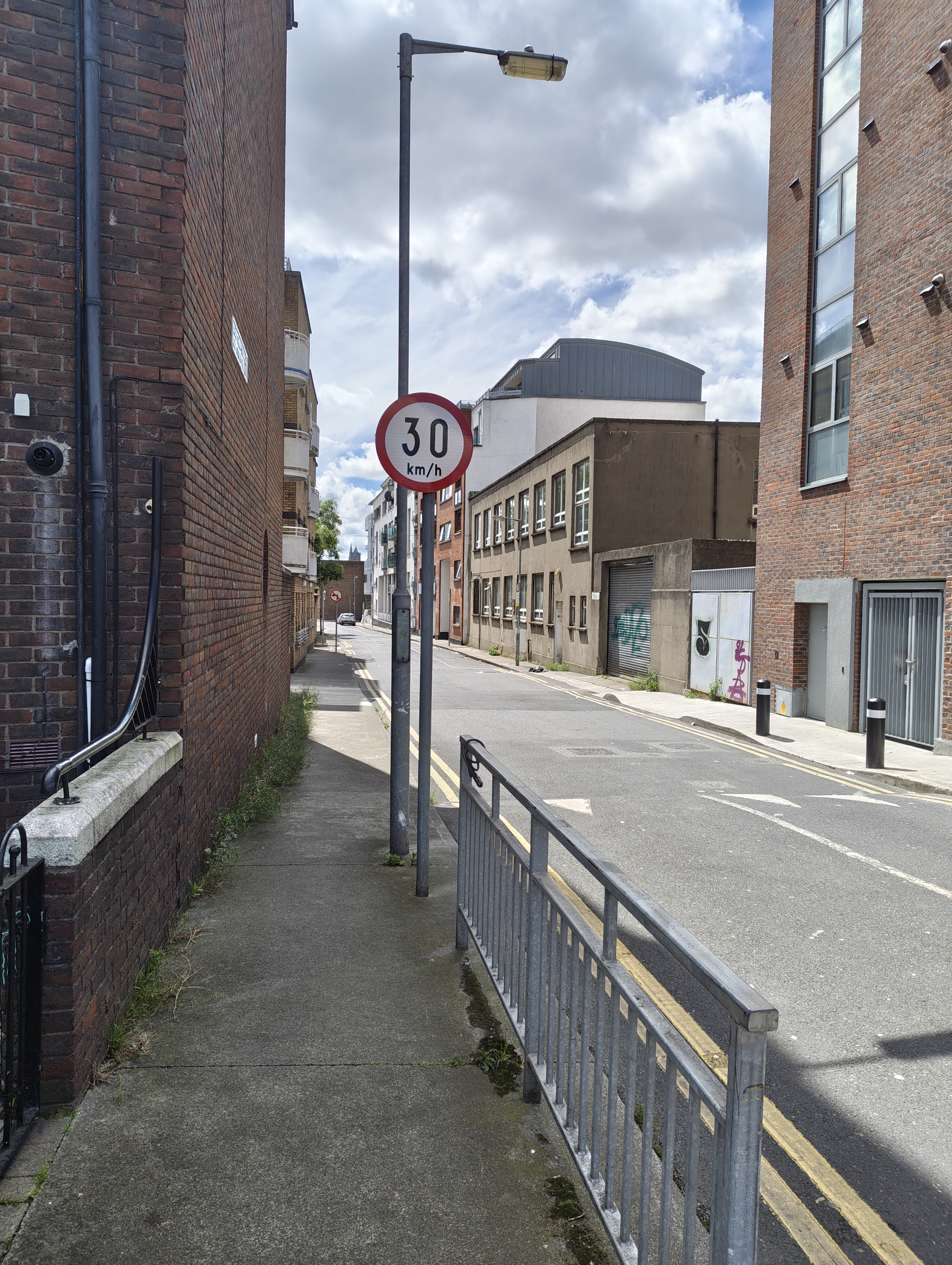
- Anne Street North looking south towards George's Hill
- Interactive map of Anne Street North
- Native name: Sráid Anna Thuaidh (Irish)
- Location: Dublin, Ireland
- Postal code: D07
- Coordinates: 53.3497°N 6.27246°W
- North end: North King Street
- South end: George's Hill

Anne Street North (Irish: Sráid Anna Thuaidh) is a street on the northside of Dublin, Ireland. The street runs from North King Street at the north to George's Hill in the south.

== History ==
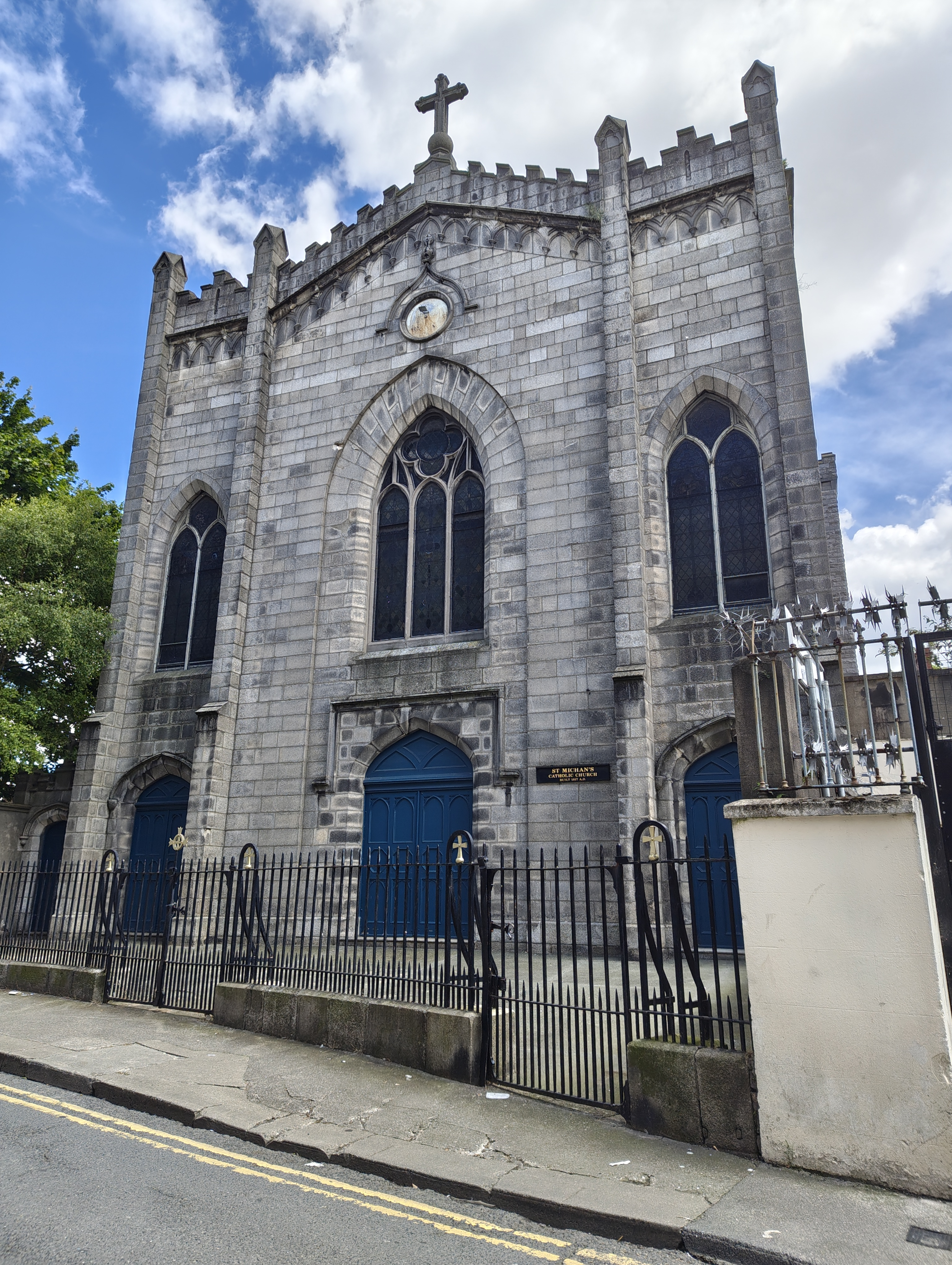
St Michan's Catholic Church entrance on Anne Street North

The street is named as the land was owned by St Anne's Guild, the guild of bakers, and is mentioned in 1581 as "S. Anne's ground without Newgate". It forms part of the wider Smithfield area. Anne Street North first appears on maps in 1756.

The street features large stone warehouses of the local Jameson Distillery on Bow Street, that have been converted into apartments. Until the 1990s, the street has become run-down, but was regenerated from the late 1990s onwards. St Michan's Church sits on the eastern side of the street. In the 1860s, there was a large number of tenements on the street.

A plaque to Joe Brady was erected by the Cabra Historical Society in 2017, as an "Irish National Invincible". It was erected on number 22.
