= Robert Wikeford =

Lord Chancellor of Ireland

Robert Wikeford or de Wikeford (c.1320 – 29 August 1390) was an English-born diplomat, lawyer and judge, who became Lord Chancellor of Ireland and Archbishop of Dublin.

== Early career ==
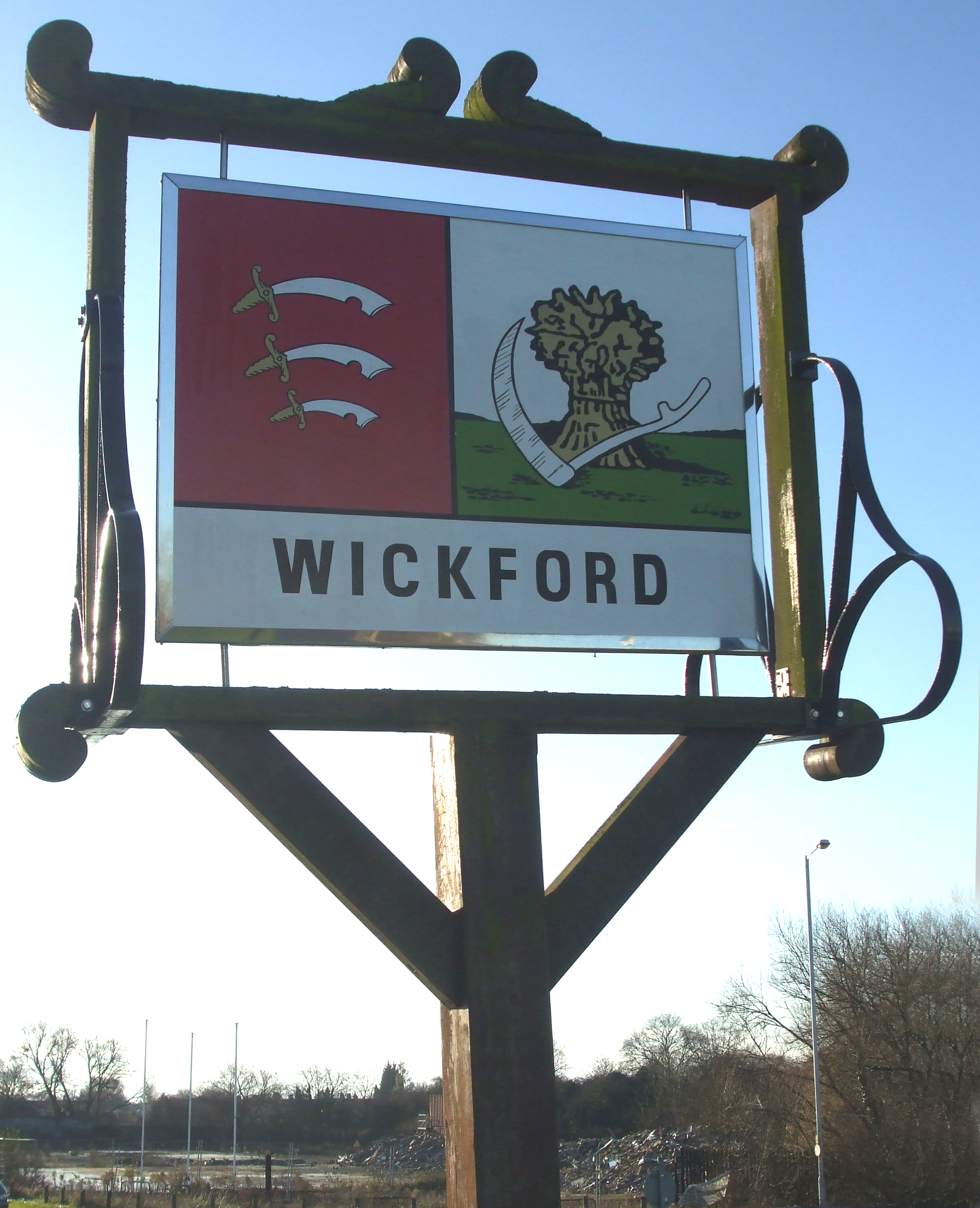
Wickford, Essex, present day.

He was born at Wickford in Essex, a member of the de Wickford or Wykeford family who are said to have been Lords of the Manor of Wickford Hall. He was a fellow of Merton College, Oxford c.1340/1, and on his death bequeathed the College his altar cloths. He was awarded a doctorate of law before 1368. He became a clerk in the English Chancery, and was appointed Archdeacon of Winchester in 1368.

He was clearly a man of considerable diplomatic and military ability, and was entrusted by King Edward III with a number of diplomatic missions, notably to Count Louis II of Flanders, Joanna, Duchess of Brabant and King Peter IV of Aragon. In 1373 he was made Constable of Bordeaux and then joined with the Seneschal in the government of Aquitaine. The King referred to Wikeford as "our beloved clerk", and he is described as Doctor of both laws (i.e. canon and common law).

O'Flanagan records that in 1375 the royal judges in Aquitaine, Sir Guy de Bryan and Edmund Mortimer, 3rd Earl of March, in a lawsuit brought by Ivo Beausteau against Wikeford, gave judgement against him without hearing him in his own defence and imposed financial penalties of great severity on him. Wikeford appealed to the King in Council, and the King immediately ordered the judgement to be cancelled. This episode suggests that Wikeford, though a valued Crown servant, was not popular.

He was also sued by another Royal clerk called Thomas, who obtained a judgement against him for £10 (a large sum in the fourteenth century) shortly before his translation to Dublin. To Wikeford's embarrassment, Thomas was permitted to issue a writ to distrain any lands held by the Archbishop in Ireland in satisfaction of the judgment.

== Irish career ==
In 1375, on the death of Thomas Minot, Wickford was elected Archbishop of Dublin by the Dean and Chapter of St Patrick's Cathedral, as was then the normal practice, and a year later he was made Lord Chancellor of Ireland. In 1378 the Crown ordered payment to him of his arrears of salary as Chancellor in the amount of £10, part payment of a full year's salary of £40. An identical order was made the following year.

O'Flanagan believes (despite the lack of written records for this period) that he was a gifted and conscientious Chancellor. In addition to his judicial business, he undertook a vast range of official duties, including the holding of a Parliament at Castledermot. As was customary for the Archbishopric of Dublin, he was granted the manor of Swords, north of Dublin, and the right to hold a fair there. In 1378 he complained that Sir Nicholas Dagworth, the official sent to govern Ireland on the recall of Sir William de Windsor, had unjustly deprived him of his manor of Swords, on an obscure legal pretext: eventually, Wikeford recovered the manor. He also held Kindlestown Castle in Delgany, County Wicklow.

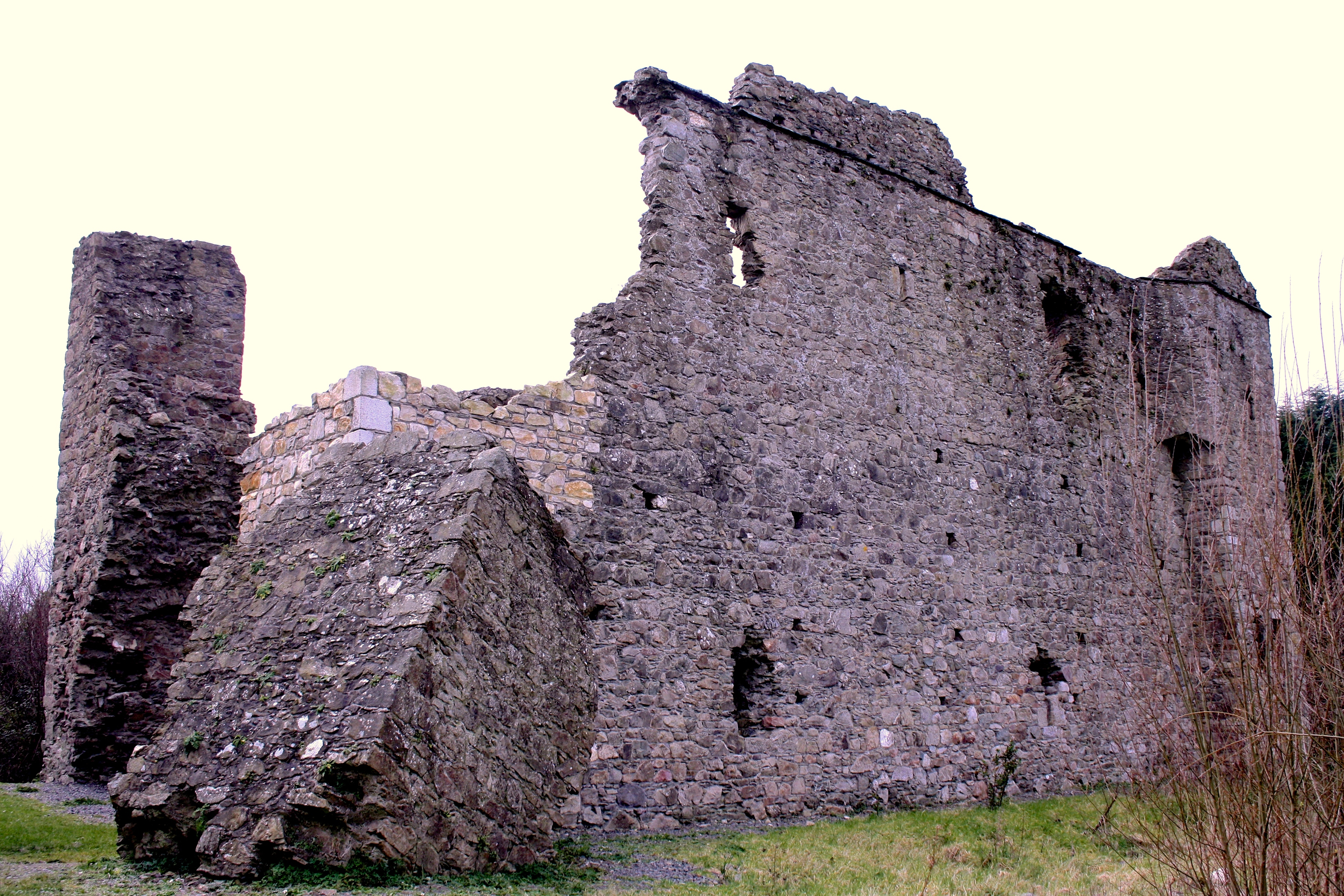
Kindlestown Castle

In 1381 he arranged for the grant of a clerical subsidy by the Irish clergy. He presided over the session of Parliament which was held at Naas in 1382/3, whose members urged him to remain in Ireland, where they would have the benefit of his wisdom and experience. The following year he visited England on official business concerning his archdiocese, and to brief the Council on Irish affairs. He delivered what has been described as "a typically apocalyptic prediction of doom" on the threat to the English of the Pale from their Gaelic enemies.

He ceased to be Chancellor about 1385, due it was said to his bitter quarrels with the Lord Lieutenant of Ireland, Sir Philip Courtenay, and with the powerful Butler dynasty, headed by James Butler, 3rd Earl of Ormond, himself a former Lord Lieutenant. Courtenay complained about Wikeford to the King. Unlike his grandfather Edward III, Richard did not especially value Wikeford's services to the Crown, and censured him severely for exceeding his powers. The origins of the feud between Ormond and Wikeford are not entirely clear, although Wikeford had already clashed with the Butlers, whose power and influence he apparently resented, and with Sir Nicholas Dagworth, the special Crown representative sent to Dublin in 1378 to assume temporary executive powers and to inquire into maladministration by the Dublin government. The ill feeling between Wikeford and Dagworth ended in bloodshed. Wikeford also complained to the Privy Council that Dagworth had unjustly seized the manor of Swords, which had been granted to Wikeford by the Crown for life and was the heart of the Archbishop's traditional estates. As for Courtenay, he had a reputation for being rash, hot-tempered and temperamental, and from what we know about Wikeford he seems to have been rather similar in character.

As he aged, his duties as Primate became increasingly onerous. As early as 1383 he petitioned the Crown to be allowed to return to England, but was refused, on the ground that due to his knowledge of Irish affairs, his services were still required there, a point also made by the Irish Parliament at Naas. He was in England during the crisis year 1387, when the King and his opponents moved towards armed conflict, and attended the Great Council summoned by the King at Nottingham. Despite their past differences, he showed himself in this crisis to be a firm supporter of the King.

In 1390 he was given leave to return to England for a year in the hope of improving his health, but he died in England on 29 August of that year.

== Character ==
O'Flanagan praises him as a wise and learned judge and a man of great ability, and Willis gives a similarly favourable verdict. As Archbishop he was praised as being active and judicious in his management of the See of Dublin. However, the summary judgment given against him in the Aquitanian lawsuit, without Wikeford being allowed to speak in his own defence, suggests that he had influential enemies. As Lord Chancellor his quarrels with the Lord Lieutenant, the special envoy Nicholas Dagworth and the Earl of Ormond earned him a severe rebuke from King Richard II. The feud with Dagworth ended in a riot in which a man was killed, although there is no evidence that Wikeford was personally involved. As Archbishop he showed the harsher side of his character by expelling all beggars from his diocese in 1376, despite protests that many of them, so far from being "idle vagabonds", had worked hard on the restoration of St. Patrick's Cathedral, Dublin, in the time of Wikeford's predecessor Thomas Minot.

Catholic Church titles
Preceded by Thomas Minot	Archbishop of Dublin; 1375–1390	Succeeded by Robert Waldby

== Sources ==
- Ball, F. Elrington The Judges in Ireland 1221-1921 London John Murray 1926
- O'Flanagan, Roderick. J. Lives of the Lord Chancellors and Keepers of the Great Seal of Ireland London 1870
- Rhodes, Walter Eustace (1900). "Wikeford, Robert de" . In Lee, Sidney (ed.). Dictionary of National Biography. Vol. 61. London: Smith, Elder & Co.
