= Cornelius Nary =

Irish priest and religious writer

Cornelius Nary (1660–3 March 1738) was an Irish priest and religious writer. Born in County Kildare and educated at Naas, he was ordained in 1684 in Kilkenny, and shortly after moved to Paris, where he studied at the Irish College in Paris (earning a DCL from the University of Paris), where he later became provisor. In 1694 he was granted a degree (LL.D) at Cambray. For a time he was tutor to the Earl of Antrim.

He returned to Ireland at some point about 1700 where he became parish priest of St. Michan's Catholic Church, Dublin. He wrote about fifteen books.

== Select bibliography ==
- The Chief Points in Controversy between the Catholics and the Protestants (Antwerp, 1699)
- The New Testament Translated into English from the Latin (London, 1719)
