= Medieval University of Dublin =

Failed university in Ireland

Coordinates: 53.3397°N 6.2714°W

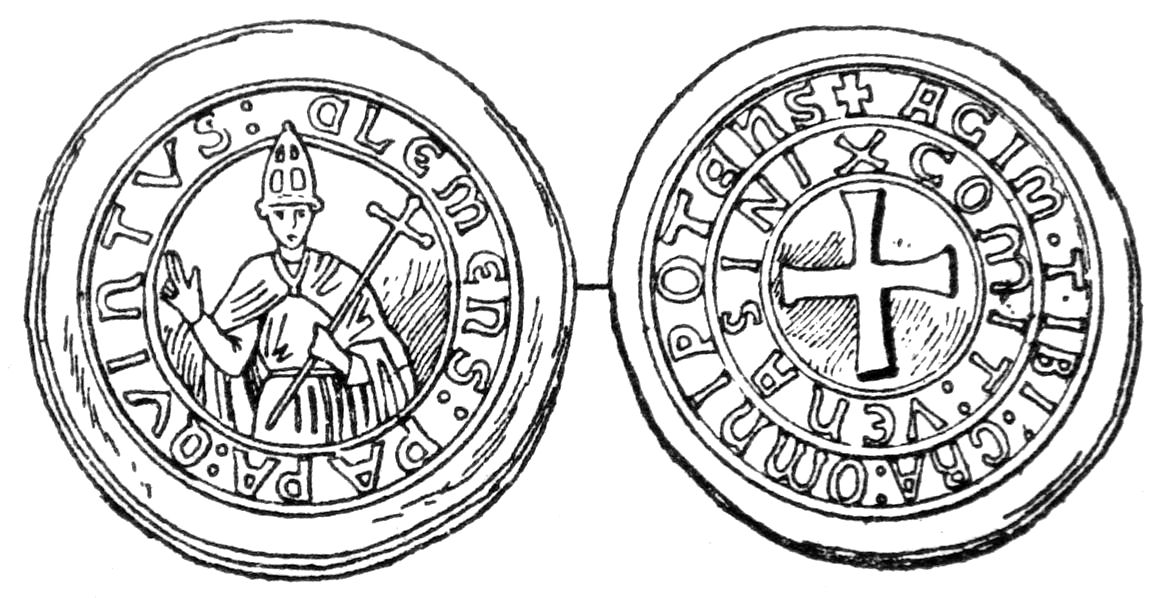
Coin of Pope Clement V (r. 1305–14), who in 1311 granted a brief to found a university at Dublin

The medieval University of Dublin (Latin: Universitas Dubliniensis) was an early unsuccessful attempt to establish a university in Dublin, the capital city of the Lordship of Ireland. Founded in 1320, it maintained an intermittent existence for the next two centuries, but it never flourished, and disappeared for good at the Reformation in Ireland (1534–41). It was located in St Patrick's Cathedral, Dublin. It had no connection with the present University of Dublin, better known as Trinity College Dublin, which was founded in 1592.

== Foundation ==
Pope Clement V granted the papal brief to found the university in 1311 to John de Leche, Archbishop of Dublin. De Leche died two years later, without having taken any steps to implement the brief, and his successor Alexander de Bicknor had many more pressing matters to deal with. It was not until 1320 that, by the authority of the papal brief of 1311, Bicknor issued a charter formally establishing the university. He appointed regent masters to elect the proctors and the chancellor. The chancellor, although subject to the authority of the Archbishop of Dublin, had jurisdiction over the members of the university and power to enact college statutes, with the consent of the regents and the archbishop. There were two faculties, Theology and Law. The university had the power to confer degrees, and three Doctors of Theology were appointed. From the beginning, there was an intimate connection between the university and St Patrick's Cathedral, Dublin, and the university was accommodated at the cathedral. Membership of the university seems to have been synonymous with being a canon of the cathedral, and the Dean of St Patrick's, William de Rodyard, was elected the first chancellor. Michael Hardy was the first Master and Doctor of Theology.

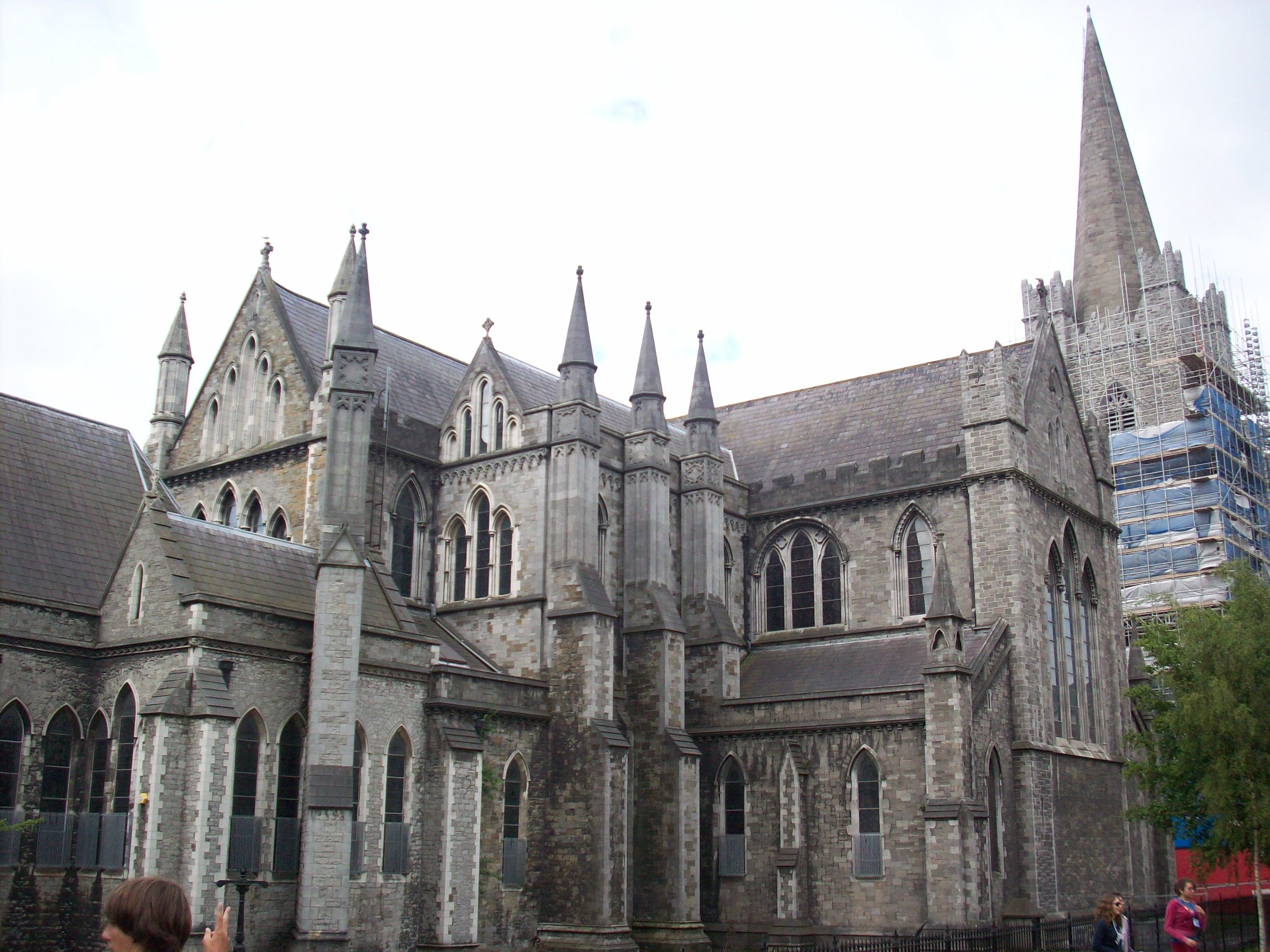
St Patrick's Cathedral, Dublin, with which the Medieval University always had a very close connection: the cathedral accommodated the university

== History ==
Cardinal Newman in his sketch of its history noted that after this quite promising beginning, no further progress was made in putting the university on a solid foundation: it may well be said that the university never got properly started. The frequently disturbed political conditions in medieval Dublin were no doubt one reason for this, but the key problem seems to have been the lack of funds. Ireland in the Middle Ages was not a rich country, and the Irish, even if they had wished to do so, were unable to provide the money which could have put the university on a secure financial footing. There was a notable absence of wealthy private benefactors like those who founded so many colleges at Oxford and Cambridge, nor was the English Crown generous with its endowments to the university.

Over the next two centuries, sporadic efforts were made to revive the university. In 1358, on the petition of the Irish clergy, King Edward III of England established another chair of theology; and in 1364 his son Lionel of Antwerp, the Lord Lieutenant of Ireland, founded a lectureship; but in the absence of sufficient funds, the university continued to languish. It has been speculated (on the basis of a tradition recorded by Archbishop James Ussher) that the Franciscan friar and annalist Friar John Clyn may have taken a doctorate from the university, during the first half of the fourteenth century.

In 1475, when, as Cardinal Newman remarks, the university could scarcely be said to still exist, Pope Sixtus IV was persuaded by John Walton, Archbishop of Dublin, to issue a brief to re-establish it; but very little seems to have been done to comply with the brief. At the Synod of Dublin in 1494, Walter Fitzsimon, Walton's successor as Archbishop of Dublin, levied a contribution on the clergy of the archdiocese for the payment of the lecturers' salaries, and it seems that some funds were made available, although they may have been used as an extra stipend for the canons of the cathedral.

== The end of the university ==
The university disappeared altogether at the Irish Reformation of 1534–41. Even under the Roman Catholic Queen Mary I, who tried, so far as practicable, to reverse the effects of the Reformation, no effort seems to have been made to revive the university.
