= Joseph Ranson =

Priest, activist and historian

The Very Reverend Joseph Ranson

Orders
- Ordination: 1930

Personal details
- Born: 1906 Killmuckridge, County Wexford
- Died: 17 November 1964 (aged 57–58) Enniscorthy, County Wexford
- Education: Gorey CBS; St Peter's College, Wexford

Joseph Ranson (1906–1964) was an Irish Catholic priest, archivist and historian, who served as the last Rector of the Irish College at Salamanca.

== Biography ==
Born in 1906, in Killmuckridge, Co. Wexford, he was educated at Gorey CBS, and St. Peter's College, Wexford, his brother Fr. Robert (Bob) Ranson DD also became a priest, their father ran an undertakers business which was founded by their grandfather. Joe Ranson, trained and was ordained a priest in 1930 in Salamanca and served in the diocese of ferns. In 1949 he was appointed rector and archivist of the Irish College in Salamanca, where he served for 4 years, organising the archives for the transfer to St. Patrick's College, Maynooth, and the transfer of the properties to the Spanish state, and money received went to the Irish College Rome. Following his posting in Salamanca, he returned to Ireland as a priest in the diocese of Ferns. He was a member of the Royal Society of Antiquaries of Ireland, and the Uí Cinsealaigh Historical Society in Wexford, contributing to their journal The Past. He founded the Wexford County Museum, in Enniscorthy Castle which opened in 1962. He died on 17 November 1964.
