= Land Ordinance =

Land Ordinance may refer to the following acts passed by the Congress of the Confederation of the United States:

- Land Ordinance of 1784
- Land Ordinance of 1785
- Land Ordinance of 1787, commonly known as the Northwest Ordinance, that created the Northwest Territory

== See also ==
- Ordinance (disambiguation)
- Land Reform Ordinance (disambiguation)
