= Luke Fagan =

Irish Roman Catholic bishop

- Archbishop of Dublin
- Church: Catholic Church
- Archdiocese: Archdiocese of Dublin
- In office: 24 September 1729 – 22 November 1733
- Predecessor: Edward Murphy
- Successor: John Linegar
- Previous post: Bishop of Meath (1713-1729)

Orders
- Ordination: 1682 by James Cusack
- Consecration: 18 February 1714 by Ambrose MacDermott

Personal details
- Born: 1659 Lickbla, County Westmeath, Kingdom of Ireland
- Died: 22 November 1733 (aged 73–74) Dublin, County Dublin, Kingdom of Ireland

Luke Fagan (b Lickbla 1659 - d Dublin 1733) was an Irish Roman Catholic bishop in the first third of the 18th century. Fagan Licabla, Castlepollard, Co. Westmeath, he was educated at Jesuit run Irish College of Seville and was ordained priest in 1682. His brother Fr. James Fagan was educated at the Irish College of Alcalá, Spain, and served as its superior.

He served as parish priest in Baldoyle and howth prior to being consecrated Bishop of Meath in 1713 and translated to the Archbishopric of Dublin in 1729. He died in post on 22 November 1733.

== Controversies ==
Fagan was involved in a number of controversies while a bishop. He was supposed to have encouraged Sylvester Lloyd OFM to translate the Jansenist leaning Francois Pouget's Montepellier catechism. Influenced by Jansenist sympathiser Fr. Paul Kenny ODC, as Bishop of Meath Fagan, ordained twelve Dutch Jansenist priests including future Archbishop of Utrecht, Petrus Johannes Meindaerts and Jerome de Bock(Bishop of Haarlem).

== Notes ==
Catholic Church titles
Preceded by See vacant	Bishop of Meath; 1713–1729	Succeeded by Stephen MacEgan
Preceded by Edward Murphy	Archbishop of Dublin; 1724–1728	Succeeded by John Linegar
