= John de Leche =

Irish bishop

John Le Leche (or John Le Leck or John Le Leek also John The Leche) (died 1313) was a canon of Dunkeld and prelate during the early 14th century. After the death of Matthew de Crambeth, Bishop of Dunkeld, in 1309, William Sinclair was elected by some of the chapter to the bishopric. John le Leche, however, was elected soon afterwards, and had the support of King Edward II of England. The diocese of Dunkeld lay vacant for three years, while the issue was contested at the Papal see. Pope Clement V appointed James, Cardinal Deacon of St George in Velabro, to judge the issue; but this was resolved when, on 22 May 1311, John de Leche was promoted to the Archbishopric of Dublin. He held the latter for two years. He obtained a charter for the earliest University in Dublin in 1311 but his sudden death in 1313 greatly hampered the establishment of the university, and it never flourished, due largely to a lack of sufficient funds. It had no connection with the present day Trinity College Dublin, which was founded in 1592.

Religious titles
Preceded by Matthew de Crambeth	Bishop of Dunkeld; Opposed by William Sinclair; 1309–1311	Succeeded by William Sinclair
Preceded by Richard de Havering	Archbishop of Dublin; 1311–1313	Succeeded by Alexander de Bicknor
