= Alexander J. McCabe =

Irish priest

Alexander J. McCabe was an Irish priest who served as Rector of the Irish College at Salamanca in Spain.

McCabe was born in Drumkilly. County Cavan, in 1900. He studied in Salamanca from 1919 until 1925. He was appointed vice-rector of the college in 1930.

Fr. McCabe was appointed by the Irish bishops as rector in 1935 of the college, and had to deal with the upheavals during the Spanish Civil war in 1936, which saw Irish students leave the college, and subsequently the Second World War. Fr McCabe tried unsuccessfully to return the college to its pre-civil war state and for it to again accept Irish students, until 1949 when he left Salamanca and returned to Ireland, eventually being replaced in 1950 as rector.

He died in 1988.
