= Dúnán =

First bishop of Dublin

Dúnán, Donatus or Donat
- Died: 1074

Dúnán (died 6 May 1074) was the first bishop of Dublin, appointed under Dublin's Hiberno-Norse kings. He is also known as Donatus or Donat. The diocese was put on a regular basis, in 1028, at the request of Sigtrygg Silkbeard. In his obit in the Annals of Ulster Dúnán is described as "chief bishop of the foreigners" (ardespoc Gall).

It has been traditionally said that Dúnán was consecrated by Æthelnoth, the Archbishop of Canterbury. This is now disputed, with scholars saying that his successor, Gilla Patráic, was the first to be consecrated in this way.

== Biography ==
Dunan was an Easterling or Ostman, and the first of the line of prelates who have occupied the see. James Ware, who mentions several so-called bishops of Dublin of an earlier date, is supported by the Martyrology of Donegal, but John Lanigan was of opinion that there are no sufficient grounds for so regarding them, except in the case of Siadhal or Sedulius, who appears to have been a bishop. Dunan is, however, termed abbot of Dublin in the 'Annals of the Four Masters' (AD 785), and from this, it would seem he was only a monastic bishop; diocesan episcopacy had not been established in Ireland in his time. Dunan, therefore, must be regarded as the first bishop of Dublin in the modern sense of the title.

The Four Masters term him "ardeasbog", which Dr. John O'Donovan translated archbishop, but James Henthorn Todd pointed out that the correct rendering of the word is "chief or eminent bishop", and that it includes no idea of jurisdiction. His diocese was comprised within the walls of the city, beyond which the Danish power did not extend.

The chief event of his life appears to have been the foundation of the church of the Holy Trinity, commonly called Christ Church, or more properly its endowment and reorganisation in accordance with the views of the Danish settlers. For it appears, from an inquisition held in the reign of Richard II, that a church had been "founded and endowed there by divers Irishmen whose names were unknown, time out of mind, and long before the conquest of Ireland". This ancient site was bestowed on Dunan by Sitric, king of the Danes of Dublin, and with it "sufficient gold and silver" for the erection of the new church, and as an endowment, he granted him "the lands Bealduleek, Rechen, and Portrahern, with their villains, corn, and cattle".

Sitric, according to the annalist Tigernach, had gone over the sea in 1035, probably for the sake of religious retirement, leaving his nephew as king of Dublin in his place. This was three years before Dunan's appointment, and as the king died in 1042, it must have been when he became a monk, if Tigernach is right, that he made the grant referred to, and therefore the new foundation of Christ Church must have taken place between 1038 and 1042.

The site is described in the Black Book of Christ Church as "the voltæ i.e. arches founded by the Danes before the arrival of St. Patrick in Ireland, and it is added that St. Patrick celebrated mass in an arch or vault which has been since known by his name". This story, as it stands, cannot be accepted as authentic history, for St. Patrick died according to the usual belief in 490, whereas the earliest mention of Danes in Ireland is in 795. In the recent discovery made at Christ Church of a crypt hitherto unknown, some very ancient work was found, which is probably part of the buildings. If so, they may be the remains of the ecclesiastical structures originally occupied by the abbots of Dublin. The legendary connection of the place with St. Patrick belongs to the period when, as Dr. O'Donovan observed, "the christian Danes refused to submit to the ecclesiastical jurisdiction of Armagh, and when it was found useful by the Danish party to have it believed that their ancestors had been settled in Dublin as early as the fifth century, and were converted to christianity by St. Patrick".

When the church was built, and the secular canons by whom it was to be served were installed, Dunan furnished it with a liberal supply of relics, of which a list is given in the Book of Obits of Christ Church, published by Dr. Todd. Other buildings erected by him were the church of St. Michael (now the Synod House), hard by the cathedral, and a palace for himself and his successors. He entered into a correspondence with Lanfranc on some ecclesiastical questions about which he desired information. Lanfranc's answer is preserved and was published by Archbishop James Ussher. It is highly probable that this deference to the Archbishop of Canterbury may have had something to do with the claim put forward by the latter in a synod held in 1072, two years before Dunan's death, in which, on the supposed authority of Bede, he asserted his supremacy over the church of Ireland – a claim which Dunan's successor admitted in the most explicit manner at his consecration in Canterbury Cathedral.

Dunan died on 12 February 1074 and was buried in Christ Church, at the right-hand side of the altar. There was another who also bore the alternative name of Donat (1085), but he is more generally known as Dungus.

== Sources ==
- Concise Dictionary of National Biography, under Dunan

Attribution

- This article incorporates text from a publication now in the public domain: Olden, Thomas (1888). "Dunan". In Stephen, Leslie (ed.). Dictionary of National Biography. Vol. 16. London: Smith, Elder & Co. p. 149. Endnotes:
  - Cogadh Gaedhel re Gallaibh, page 289
  - Annals of Four Masters, AD 785, 1074
  - Lanigan's Eccl. Hist. iii. 200, 228, 433–5
  - Todd's St. Patrick, pages 14, 16, 466
  - Ussher's Works, iv. 488, 567, vi. 424
  - Book of Rights, page xii
  - Martyrology of Donegal
