= Donngus Ua hAingliu =

Donngus Ua hAingliu (died 22 November 1095), also known as Donatus and Donat O'Haingly, was the third Bishop of Dublin. Donngus was elevated to the see of Dublin following bishop Gilla Pátraics death in 1084. He was consecrated by Lanfranc, Archbishop of Canterbury in 1085 at "the request of the king, clergy, and people of Ireland" (Acta Lanfranci)

Donngus had been trained as a monk at Christ Church in Canterbury. Like his predecessor Gilla Pátraic he returned from his consecration in 1085 with letters of exhortation from Lanfranc to the kings and clergy of Ireland. According to a subsequent letter from Lanfranc's successor in Canterbury, Anselm, Lanfranc had also given books, vestments and ornaments for the church in Dublin to Donngus.

In his obit in the Annals of Ulster Donngus is described as "bishop of Áth Cliath" (espoc Atha Cliath) just like Gilla Pátraic, while the first recorded bishop in Dublin, Dúnán, had been titled "chief bishop of the foreigners" (ardespoc Gall).

Donngus died at on November 22, 1095, from the plague.His nephew, Samuel Ua hAingliu, succeeded him as the fourth Bishop of Dublin.
