= Samuel Ua hAingliu =

Fourth bishop of Dublin

Samuel Ua hAingliu (died 1121) was the fourth bishop of Dublin. He took over the position when his uncle Donngus Ua hAingliu died of the plague in 1095.

He was Consecrated on 27 April 1096, by Anselm, archbishop of Canterbury, in Winchester cathedral on 27 April 1096.

He died in office before September 1121.
