= Ordinance =

Ordinance may refer to:

== Law ==
- Ordinance (Belgium), a law adopted by the Brussels Parliament or the Common Community Commission
- Ordinance (India), a temporary law promulgated by the President of India on recommendation of the Union Cabinet
- Emergency Ordinance (Malaysia), a type of emergency decree under the Constitution of Malaysia
- Ordinance (university), a particular class of internal legislation in a United Kingdom university
- In England during the Civil War, a law passed by parliament without royal assent; see the list of ordinances and acts of the Parliament of England, 1642–1660
  - Self-denying Ordinance, passed by the Long Parliament of England on 3 April 1645
- Legislation made by the Legislative Council of Hong Kong; see also Law of Hong Kong
- A royal decree, law promulgated on the monarch's own authority
- Delegated legislation for the Australian territories of the Australian Capital Territory and the Northern Territory, passed by the Federal Executive Council (these were mostly converted to acts after the territories gained self-government)
- By-law, a rule established by an organization to regulate itself
- Local ordinance, a law made by a municipality or other local authority
- Northwest Ordinance, July 13, 1787, an act of the Congress of the Confederation of the United States that created the Northwest Territory
- Ordinance XX, a law passed down in Pakistan which prevents Ahmadi Muslims from being identified as Muslims
- Ordinances of 1311, a series of regulations imposed upon King Edward II of England
- Ordonnance in French government, a regulation adopted by the executive in a domain normally reserved for statute law

== Religion ==
- Ordinance (Christianity), Protestant term for religious ritual
- Ordinance (Latter Day Saints), a religious ritual enacted using priesthood authority
- Baptist ordinance, Believer's Baptism and Lord's Supper
- Ecclesiastical ordinances, the bylaws of a Christian religious organization
- Ecclesiastical Ordinances, a work written by John Calvin for use in Geneva
- Ordinance room, place for Latter-day Saint ordinances
- Ordination, the process by which one is consecrated

== See also ==
- Land Ordinance (disambiguation)
- Land Reform Ordinance (disambiguation)
- List of ordinances and acts of the Parliament of England, 1642–1660
- MV Ordinence, a British coaster
