= Gilla Pátraic =

Irish Bishop

Gilla Pátraic (died 10 October 1084), also known as Patricius, was the second Bishop of Dublin. Gilla Pátraic was elevated to the see of Dublin following bishop Dúnán's death in 1074. He was consecrated by Lanfranc, Archbishop of Canterbury. Whether Gilla Pátraic or Dúnán was the first Irish bishop to be consecrated in Canterbury is disputed.

Before he became bishop of Dublin Gilla Pátraic had been a monk in a Benedictine community at Worcester, the prior then had been Wulfstan, later Bishop of Worcester.

He drowned along with his companions crossing the Irish Sea on 10 October 1084.
