= Archbishop of Dublin (Catholic Church) =

Presiding over the Archdiocese of Dublin, Ireland

- Archbishopric

catholic
- Incumbent; Dermot Farrell
- Style: His Grace

Location
- Country: Ireland

Information
- First holder: Dúnán, Bishop of Dublin
- Established: 1028
- Cathedral: St Mary's Cathedral, Dublin

Website
- dublindiocese.ie

The Archbishop of Dublin (Irish: Ard-Easpag Bhaile Átha Cliath) is the head of the Archdiocese of Dublin in the Catholic Church, responsible for its spiritual and administrative needs. The office has existed since 1152, in succession to a regular bishopric (subject to Canterbury, and within the wider jurisdiction of Glendalough) since 1028. The archdiocese is the metropolitan see of the ecclesiastical province of Dublin, and the archbishop is also styled the Primate of Ireland. The cathedral church of the archdiocese is St Mary's Cathedral in Dublin city, although the Church formally claims Christ Church as its cathedral, and the archbishop's residence is Archbishop's House in Drumcondra.

As of 2022, the incumbent ordinary is Dermot Farrell, who was installed on 2 February 2021.

The office is not to be confused with a similar role in the Church of Ireland, though both claim a common descent from the head of the Norse Diocese of Dublin, appointed in 1028, and the elevation of the see in 1152.

== History ==
=== Before the diocese ===
What became the Dublin area was Christian long before it had a distinct diocese, and there are remains and memory of monasteries famous before that time, at Finglas, Glasnevin, Glendalough, Kilnamanagh, Rathmichael, Swords, Tallaght, among others. Several of these functioned as "head churches" and the most powerful of all was Glendalough. In the early church in Ireland, the church had a monastic basis, with the greatest power vested in the abbots of major communities. There were bishops but not organised dioceses in the modern sense, and the offices of abbot and bishop were often held by one person. Some early "Bishops of Dublin", back to 633, are mentioned in Ware's Antiquities of Ireland but the Diocese of Dublin is not considered to have begun until 1038, and when Ireland began to see organised dioceses, all of the current Diocese of Dublin, and more, were comprised in the Diocese of Glendalough.

=== The Norse diocese and early bishops ===
Following a reverted conversion by one Norse King of Dublin, Sitric, his son Godfrey became Christian in 943, and the Kingdom of Dublin first sought to have a bishop of their own in the 11th century, under Sitric MacAulaf, who had been on pilgrimage to Rome. He sent his chosen candidate, Donat (or Donagh, Dúnán or Donatus) to be consecrated at Canterbury, England, in 1038, and the new prelate set up the Diocese of Dublin as a small territory within the walled city, over which he presided until 1074. Sitric also provided for the building of Christ Church Cathedral in 1038 "with the lands of Baldoyle, Raheny and Portrane for its maintenance."

The Bishop of Dublin answered to the Archbishop of Canterbury and did not attend councils of the Irish Church. The Diocese of Dublin continued to acknowledge the jurisdiction of Canterbury until 1096, and was not included in the list of Irish dioceses at the Synod of Rathbreasail. The Synod of Rathbreasail was convened in 1111 by Gillebert (Gilbert), Bishop of Limerick, on papal authority. It fixed the number of dioceses in Ireland at twenty-four. Dublin was not included, the city being described as lying in the Diocese of Glendalough. It was incorporated into the system of Irish dioceses in 1152.

The second Bishop of Dublin was Patrick or Gilla Pátraic (1074–1084), consecrated at St. Paul's, London, followed by Donngus Ua hAingliu (Donat O'Haingly), 1085–1095, consecrated at Canterbury, and in turn succeeded by his nephew, Samuel Ua hAingliu (Samuel O'Haingly) (1096–1121), consecrated by St. Anselm at Winchester.

From 1121, the fifth and last Bishop of Dublin was one Gréne (Gregory), consecrated at Lambeth by Ralph, Archbishop of Canterbury.

=== Reorganisation of the Church in Ireland, 1152 ===
Then, in 1151, Pope Eugene III commissioned Cardinal Paparo to go to Ireland and establish four metropolitans, and at a general synod at Kells in 1152, Armagh, Dublin, Cashel and Tuam were created archepiscopal sees. In a document drawn up by the then Archbishop of Tuam in 1214, the cardinal is described as finding both a bishop based in Dublin, who at the time exercised his episcopal office within the city walls only, and "He found in the same Diocese another church in the mountains, which likewise had the name of a city [Glendalough] and had a certain chorepiscopus. But he delivered the pallium to Dublin which was the best city and appointed that the diocese (Glendalough) in which both these cities were should be divided, and that one part thereof should fall to the metropolitan." The part of North County Dublin known as Fingall was taken from Glendalough Diocese and attached to Dublin City. The new Archdiocese had 40 parishes, in deaneries based on the old senior monasteries. All dependence upon English churches such as Canterbury was also ended by the synod.

=== Early archbishops ===
Gregory, the existing Bishop of Dublin, was elevated as the first archbishop, with the bishops of Kildare, Ossory, Leighlin, Ferns, and Glendalough reporting to him. The second archbishop was Lorcán Ua Tuathail (Saint Laurence O'Toole), previously abbot of Glendalough, who had previously been elected as bishop of Glendalough but had declined that office. During his time in office, religious orders from the continent came to Ireland, and as part of this trend, Laurence installed a community of canons to minister according to the Aroasian Rule in the Cathedral of the Holy Trinity, later known as Christ Church Cathedral, Dublin.

Not only was the Irish Church transformed in that 12th century by new organisations and new arrivals from abroad, but Ireland's political scene was changed permanently by the coming of the Normans and the influence of the English Crown from 1171. Saint Laurence's successor was a Norman, and from then onward to the time of the Reformation, Dublin's archbishops were all either Norman or English. High offices in the Church were never free of political influence, and in fact, many of Dublin's archbishops exercised civil authority for the English crown. Archbishop Henry of London's name appears in the text of Magna Carta along with the names of English bishops as witnesses. In 1185, the Pope granted a petition to combine the Dioceses of Dublin and Glendalough, to take effect on the death of the then bishop of Glendalough. The union took effect in 1216, with the approval of Innocent III, and the dioceses have remained merged ever since.

=== The University Project ===
Archbishop de Leche of Dublin received a papal bull from Clement V in 1311, authorising him to establish the Medieval University of Dublin, and this process was completed in 1320, when the university statutes were confirmed by Pope John XXII to the next Archbishop, Alexander de Bicknor. The statutes mention the Chapters of both St. Patrick's and Christ Church Cathedrals, which are granted the power to confer degrees, and the aim appears to have been to provide lectures at the former. The Dean of St. Patrick's, William de Rodyard, was elected first Chancellor of the university, and in 1358, King Edward III issued letters patent conferring protection on the students. In 1364, a Divinity Lecture was endowed, and in 1496, the Diocesan Synod granted stipends for the lecturers of the university. It has been said that the university never properly got started; certainly it languished, due to the lack of sufficient endowments. The university ended with the dissolution of the cathedral organisation under King Henry VIII, though Archbishop George Browne attempted to revive it, and Archbishop Adam Loftus originally supported this also (before he became first Provost of Trinity College).

=== Reformation period 1533-1570 ===
Archbishop Alen was murdered during the revolt of "Silken Thomas" in 1534. After the excommunication of Henry VIII in 1538, no Roman Catholic archbishop was nominated by Rome until Hugh Curwen in 1555, in the brief reign of Queen Mary.

=== 16th to 18th centuries ===
The immediate aftermath of the Reformation saw a lacuna in the see of Dublin, with some provisions made, such as the Bishop of Cloyne being granted special faculties over other dioceses, including Dublin, in 1675.

=== 19th to 20th centuries ===
Some historians consider Paul Cullen, Archbishop of Dublin from 1852, and Ireland's first cardinal, from 1866, to have been the most powerful political figure in Ireland between Daniel O'Connell and Charles Stewart Parnell. A successor, John Charles McQuaid, exerted even more power over Irish affairs.

== Cathedrals ==
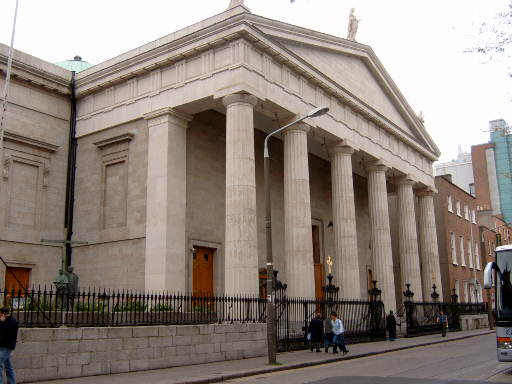
St Mary's Cathedral, Dublin, the episcopal seat of the Roman Catholic archbishops.

From the Middle Ages, the seat of the Archbishop of Dublin was Christ Church Cathedral, Dublin, although for many centuries, it shared this status with St Patrick's Cathedral, and the archbishop had roles at both places. In early times, there was considerable conflict over status but under the six-point agreement of 1300, Pacis Compositio:

- The consecration and enthronement of the Archbishop of Dublin was to take place at Christ Church – records show that this provision was not always followed, with many archbishops enthroned in both, and at least two in St. Patrick's only
- Christ Church had formal precedence, as the mother and senior cathedral of the diocese
- Christ Church was to retain the cross, mitre and ring of each deceased Archbishop of Dublin
- Deceased Archbishops of Dublin were to be buried alternately in each of the two cathedrals, unless they personally willed otherwise
- The annual consecration of chrism oil for the diocese was to take place at Christ Church
- The two cathedrals were to act as one, and shared equally in their freedoms

As the established Church of Ireland retained both ancient cathedrals after the Reformation, the Roman Catholic prelate had no cathedral for several centuries but now maintains his seat at St Mary's Cathedral.

== Residence ==
The office-holder's official residence is Archbishop's house in Drumcondra, where he has a two-room suite, the building largely functioning as meeting and office space in modern times.

== Status ==
See the article Primate of Ireland for a discussion of the relative status of the Archbishops of Dublin and Armagh as Primates.

== See also ==
- Archbishop of Dublin, which lists of pre- and post-Reformation archbishops

== Sources ==
- The Catholic Encyclopedia (New York: Robert Appleton Company, 1909)
