= History of Kilkenny =

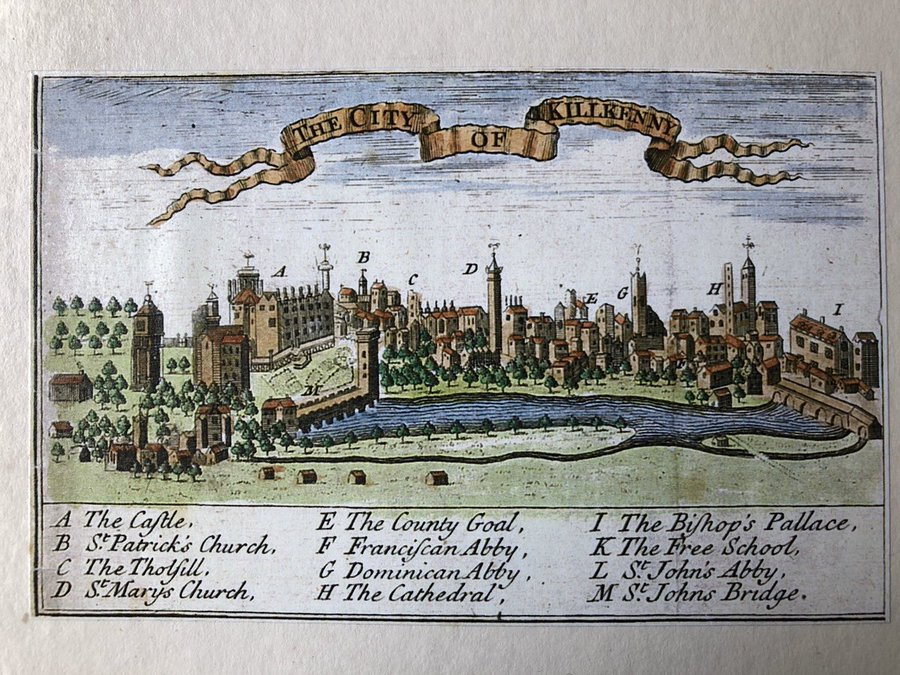
Map of the city of Kilkenny (1708).

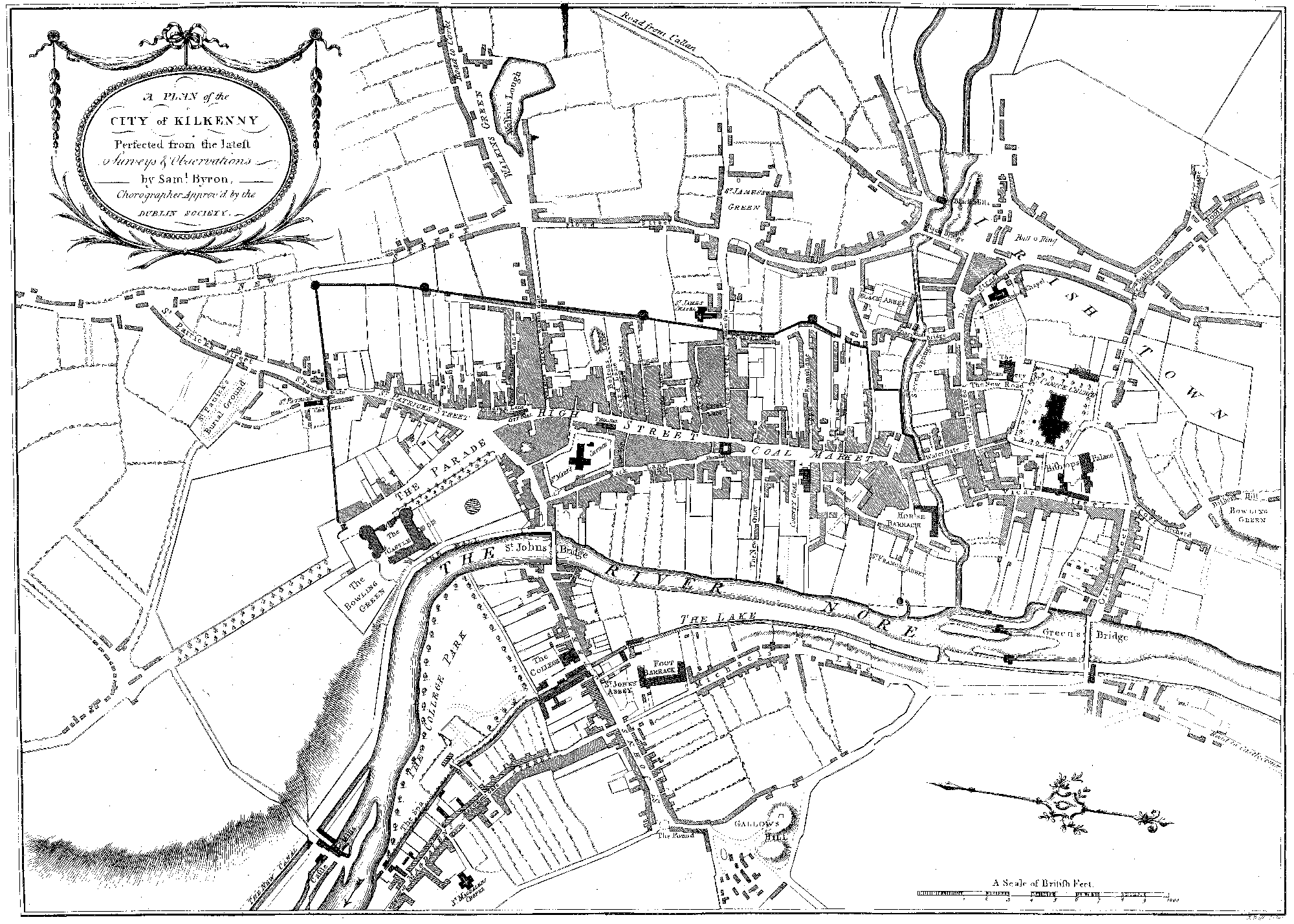
Old city map, c.1780.

The history of Kilkenny (from Irish Cill Chainnigh 'Cell or church of Cainnech/Canice') began with an early sixth-century ecclesiastical foundation, this relates to a church built in honour of St. Canice, now St. Canice's Cathedral and was a major monastic centre from at least the eighth century. The Annals of the Four Masters recorded the first reference Cill Chainnigh in 1085. Prehistoric activity has been recorded suggesting intermittent settlement activity in the area in the Mesolithic and Bronze Age. Information on the history of Kilkenny can be found from newspapers, photographs, letters, drawings, manuscripts and archaeology. Kilkenny is documented in manuscripts from the 13th century onwards and one of the most important of these is Liber Primus Kilkenniensis.

The Kings of Ossory had residence around Cill Chainnigh. The seat of diocese of Kingdom of Osraige was moved from Aghaboe to Cill Chainnigh. Following Norman invasion of Ireland, Richard Strongbow, as Lord of Lenister, established a castle near modern-day Kilkenny Castle. William Marshall began the development of the town of Kilkenny and a series of walls to protect the burghers. By the late thirteenth century Kilkenny was under Norman-Irish control. The original ecclesiastical centre at St. Canice's Cathedral became known as Irishtown and the Anglo-Norman borough inside the wall came to be known as Hightown.

Hiberno-Norman Kilkenny presence in Kilkenny was deeply shaken by the Black Death, which arrived in Kilkenny in 1348. The Statutes of Kilkenny passed at Kilkenny in 1367, aimed to curb the decline of the Hiberno-Norman Lordship of Ireland. In 1609 King James I of England granted Kilkenny a Royal Charter giving it the status of a city. Following the Rebellion of 1641, the Irish Catholic Confederation, also known as the "Confederation of Kilkenny", and was based in Kilkenny and lasted until the Cromwellian conquest of Ireland in 1649. James II of England spent most of the winter months from November 1689 until January 1690 at Kilkenny, residing in the castle

The Kilkenny Design Workshops were opened in 1965 and in 1967 the Marquess of Ormonde presented Kilkenny Castle to the people of Kilkenny. Today, the city has a lively cultural scene, with annual events including the Kilkenny Arts Week Festival in the last two weeks of August, and the Cat Laughs Comedy Festival at the beginning of June. The city has been referred to as the Marble City. People from Kilkenny are often referred to as Cats. The seat of the Roman Catholic Bishop of Ossory is at St. Mary's Cathedral and the Church of Ireland Bishop of Cashel and Ossory is at St. Canice's Cathedral.

Historical population
| Year | Pop. | ±% |
|---|---|---|
| 1821 | 23,230 | — |
| 1831 | 23,741 | +2.2% |
| 1841 | 19,071 | −19.7% |
| 1851 | 15,257 | −20.0% |
| 1861 | 13,235 | −13.3% |
| 1871 | 12,710 | −4.0% |
| 1881 | 12,299 | −3.2% |
| 1891 | 11,048 | −10.2% |
| 1901 | 10,609 | −4.0% |
| 1911 | 19,514 | +83.9% |
| 1926 | 10,046 | −48.5% |
| 1936 | 10,237 | +1.9% |
| 1946 | 10,291 | +0.5% |
| 1951 | 10,572 | +2.7% |
| 1956 | 12,328 | +16.6% |
| 1961 | 12,081 | −2.0% |
| 1966 | 12,030 | −0.4% |
| 1971 | 13,306 | +10.6% |
| 1981 | 16,886 | +26.9% |
| 1986 | 17,517 | +3.7% |
| 1991 | 17,669 | +0.9% |
| 1996 | 18,696 | +5.8% |
| 2002 | 20,735 | +10.9% |
| 2006 | 22,179 | +7.0% |

== Prehistoric ==
Prehistoric activity has been recorded suggesting intermittent settlement activity in the area in the Mesolithic and Bronze Age.

== Early Christian ==
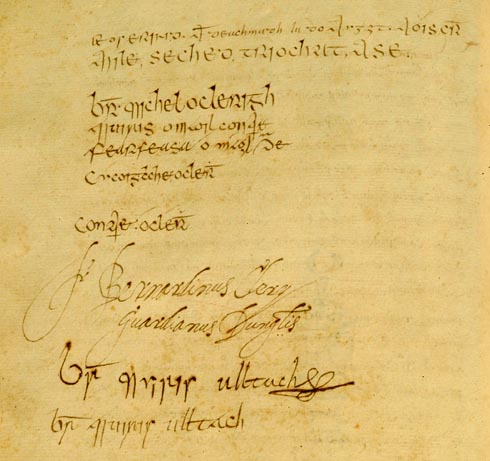
Signatures of the Four Masters.

Kilkenny is the anglicised version of the Irish Cill Chainnigh, meaning Cell/Church of Cainneach or Canice. This relates to a church built in honour of St. Canice on the hill now containing St. Canice's Cathedral and the round tower. This seems to be the first major settlement. The early Christian origin of the round tower suggests an early ecclesiastical foundation at Kilkenny.

Ceall-Cainnigh was for the most part burned.

— - Four Masters, Annals of the Four Masters, 1085.

The Annals of the Four Masters recorded Kilkenny in 1085. Prior to this time the early 6th-century territory was known as Osraighe, referring to the whole district or the capital. The Four Masters entry was the first instance where the capital was called Ceall-Cainnigh (modernised Kilkenny). There is no mention of Cill Chainnigh in the lives of Cainnech of Aghaboe, Ciarán of Saighir or any of the early annals of Ireland suggesting that Cill Chainnigh was not of ancient civil importance. Cill Chainnigh was a major monastic centre from at least the eighth century and the Kings of Osraige had residence there. The seat of diocese of Kingdom of Osraige was moved from Aghaboe to Cill Chainnigh.

== Medieval (1169—1541) ==
Kilkenny formed part of the Lordship of Leinster created in the wake of the Norman invasion of Ireland in 1169–71. Richard de Clare, 2nd Earl of Pembroke, commonly known as Strongbow, became Lord of Leinster in 1171. In 1172 Strongbow constructed the first castle, a wooden fortress, near what is now Kilkenny Castle. This was possibly on the site of an earlier residence of the Mac Gilla Pátraic (Fitzpatrick) who was in control of the Kingdom of Osraige. The building of Norman fortresses, walls, castle and town begun. In an attempt by the Gaelic clans to resist the Normans, O'Brien and Mac Gillapatrick destroyed Strongbow's fortress in 1173.

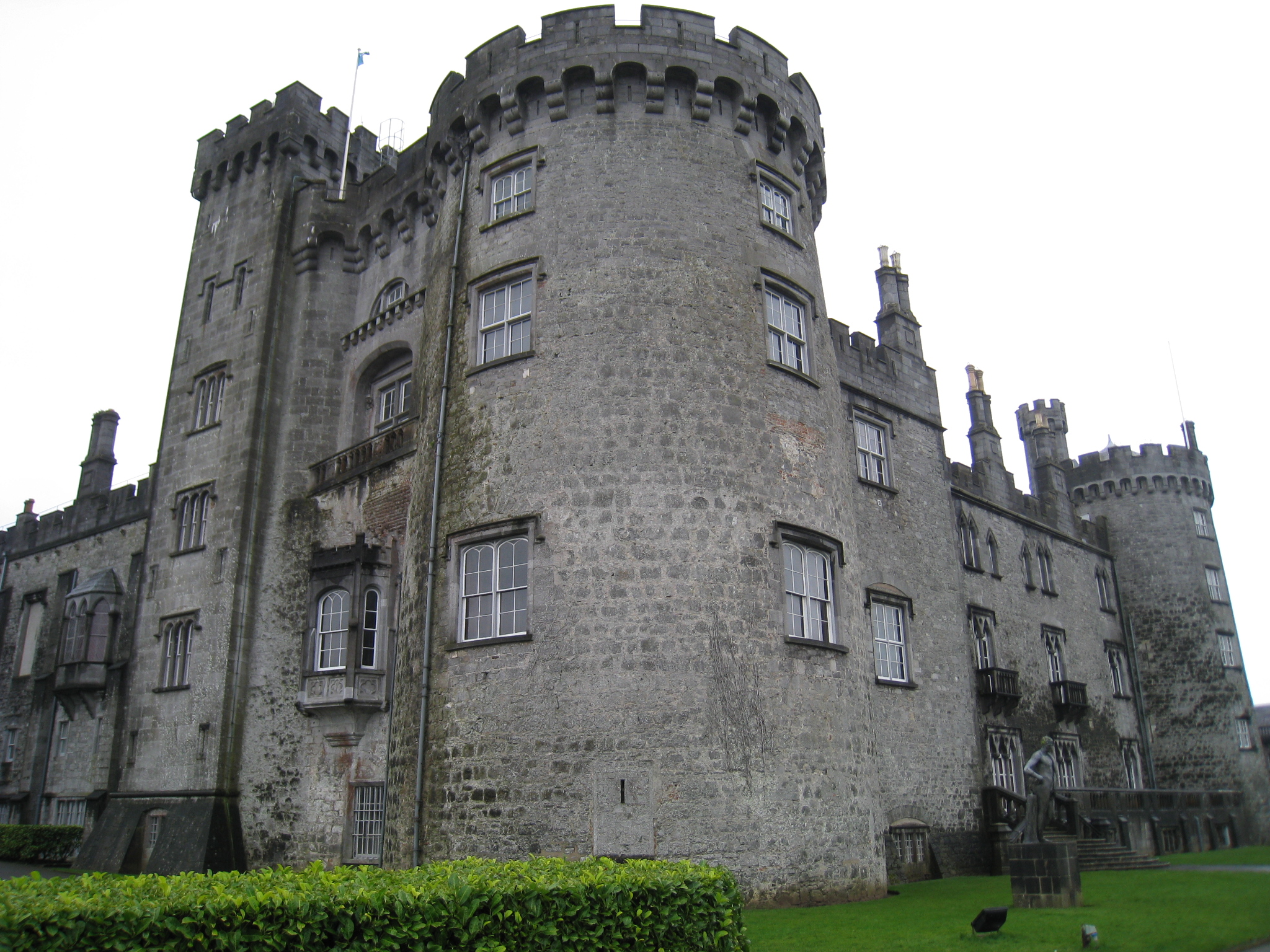
Kilkenny Castle

King of England Richard I arranged for William Marshal, 1st Earl of Pembroke to marry the 17-year-old daughter of Richard Strongbow Isabel de Clare, 4th Countess of Pembroke in 1189. Earl Marshal, William Marshall became Lord of Leinster 1192 and made numerous improvements to his wife's lands, including in Kilkenny. With the appointment of Geoffrey FitzRobert as Seneschal of Leinster a major phase of development in Kilkenny began. In 1195 William Marshall rebuilt the fortress at Kilkenny, later to be rebuilt (close by) as the thirteenth-century Kilkenny Castle.

In 1202 under the reign of Hugh de Rous, Bishop of Ossory (1202–1215), work began on St. Canice's Cathedral. Certain historians cite this as the timeframe the See of Ossory was moved from Aghaboe to Kilkenny. The first stone castle at Kilkenny Castle was begun in 1204 by William Marshall the site was completed in 1213. A charter of 1207 from William Marshal, 1st Earl of Pembroke confirmed privileges on the town and the town was extended northwards as far as the River Breagagh by an exchange of lands with the bishop of Ossory.

There were two townships: Irishtown and Hightown. The original ecclesiastical centre at St. Canice's Cathedral became known as Irishtown and was a possession of the bishop of Ossory. The Anglo-Norman borough inside the wall came to be known as Hightown. Irishtown had its charter from the bishops of Ossory and Hightown which was established by William Marshal, 1st Earl of Pembroke. A series of walls was built to protect the burghers.

There were also suburbs which became either depopulated (for example Flemingstown, now under the Castle Park) or incorporated into the city (Highhays, Donaghmore).

The Augustinians order of monks were based in John Street prior to 1200. In 1211, William Marshall granted by charter a new site in the present John Street for a new Priory, known as the Priory of St. John the Evangelist. Building continued on the site for many years. In 1219 William Marshall, seneschal of Ireland died.

The Black Abbey was founded in Kilkenny city by William Marshall the younger. By the late thirteenth century Kilkenny was under Norman-Irish control. The Norman presence in the city is still very evident.

=== Witchcraft ===
In the Late Middle Ages, 1320, the first recorded instance of a person being charged with witchcraft in Ireland was Dame Alice Kyteler, the only child of an established Hiberno-Norman family in Kilkenny. The trial of Alice, her son and ten others, for heresy, was of one of the earliest witchcraft accusations in Europe. It was the first known trial to treat women practising witchcraft as an organised group. While centuries before the more famous witch trials in the sixteenth and seventeenth centuries, Pope John XXII had formalised the persecution of witchcraft in 1320 when he authorised the Inquisition to prosecute sorcerers. While those accused of witchcraft were not tortured and executed on a large scale until the fifteenth century, in Kilkenny, those convicted were whipped and Petronilla de Meath, Alice's maidservant, was burned alive at the stake. She was the first case in Ireland's history of death by fire for the crime of heresy.

Dame Alice Kyteler was born in 1280 into the noble Kyteler family in Kilkenny. Alice was married four times, and each husband died. After her last husband Sir John le Poer died, her children accused her of using poison and sorcery to kill him, in the hope they would gain her fortune. The case was brought before the Bishop of Ossory, Richard de Ledrede and he found Alice and her followers rejected the Christian faith. The bishop wrote to the Chancellor of Ireland, Roger Utlagh or Outlawe to have Alice arrested. Outlawe was Alice's brother-in-law and he imprisoned the Bishop and Sir Arnold le Poer, the seneschal of Kilkenny. After seventeen days in prison, the bishop was released and continued to pursue and torture Alice's maidservant Petronilla de Meath. It is presumed that Alice and Petronilla's daughter, Basilia fled to the Kingdom of England. Petronilla was then forced to proclaim publicly that Alice and her followers were guilty of witchcraft. Her extracted confession included claims that she and her mistress applied a magical ointment to a wooden beam, which enabled both women to fly. She was then burned alive at the stake.

=== Statutes of Kilkenny ===
Hiberno-Norman Kilkenny presence in Kilkenny was deeply shaken by the Black Death, which arrived in Kilkenny in 1348. Because most of the English and Norman inhabitants of Kilkenny lived in towns and villages, the plague hit them far harder than it did the native Irish, who lived in more dispersed rural settlements.

A celebrated account from a monastery in Cill Chainnigh (Kilkenny), by Friar John Clyn in 1348 chronicles the plague as the beginning of the extinction of humanity and the end of the world.

The pestilence gathered strength in Kilkenny during Lent, for between Christmas day and 6 March, eight Friars Preachers died. There was scarcely a house in which only one died but commonly man and wife with their children and family going one way, namely, crossing to death.

The plague was a catastrophe for the English habitations around the country and, after it had passed, Gaelic Irish language and customs came to dominate the country again. The English-controlled area shrunk back to the Pale, a fortified area around Dublin.

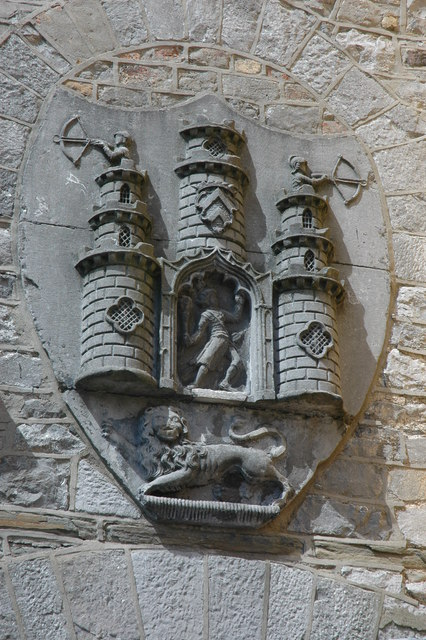
The city shield as carved on the Tholsel

The Statutes of Kilkenny were a series of thirty-five acts passed at Kilkenny in 1367, aiming to curb the decline of the Hiberno-Norman Lordship of Ireland. By the middle decades of the 13th century, the Hiberno-Norman presence in Ireland was perceived to be under threat, mostly due to the dissolution of English laws and customs among English settlers. These English settlers were described as "more Irish than the Irish themselves", referring to them taking up Irish law, custom, costume and language. The introduction to the text of the statutes claim;

"now many English of the said land, forsaking the English language, manners, mode of riding, laws and usages, live and govern themselves according to the manners, fashion, and language of the Irish enemies; and also have made divers marriages and alliances between themselves and the Irish enemies aforesaid; whereby the said land, and the liege people thereof, the English language, the allagiance due to our lord the king, and the English laws there, are put in subjection and decayed".

— - Introduction to the Statutes of Kilkenny

The statutes tried to prevent this "middle nation", which was neither true English nor (subjugated) Irish, by reasserting English culture among the English settlers.

The statutes begin by recognising that the English settlers had been influenced by Irish culture and customs, as quoted above. They forebode the intermarriage between the native Irish and the native English, the English fostering of Irish children, the English adoption of Irish children and use of Irish names and dress. Those English colonists who did not know how to speak English were required to learn the language (on pain of losing their land and belongings), along with many other English customs. The Irish pastimes of "horling" and "coiting" were to be dropped and pursuits such as archery and lancing to be taken up, so that the English colonists would be more able to defend against Irish aggression, using English military tactics.

== Post-Medieval ==
=== City of Kilkenny ===
William Marshall, Lord of Leinster, had given Kilkenny a charter setting out the rights of its burgesses and freemen in 1207. Its first Council was elected in 1231 and since then Kilkenny has had a continuous record of municipal government. From the 13th century to the end of the 16th the chief magistrate was known as the Sovereign, and since then as Mayor, for its chief citizen.

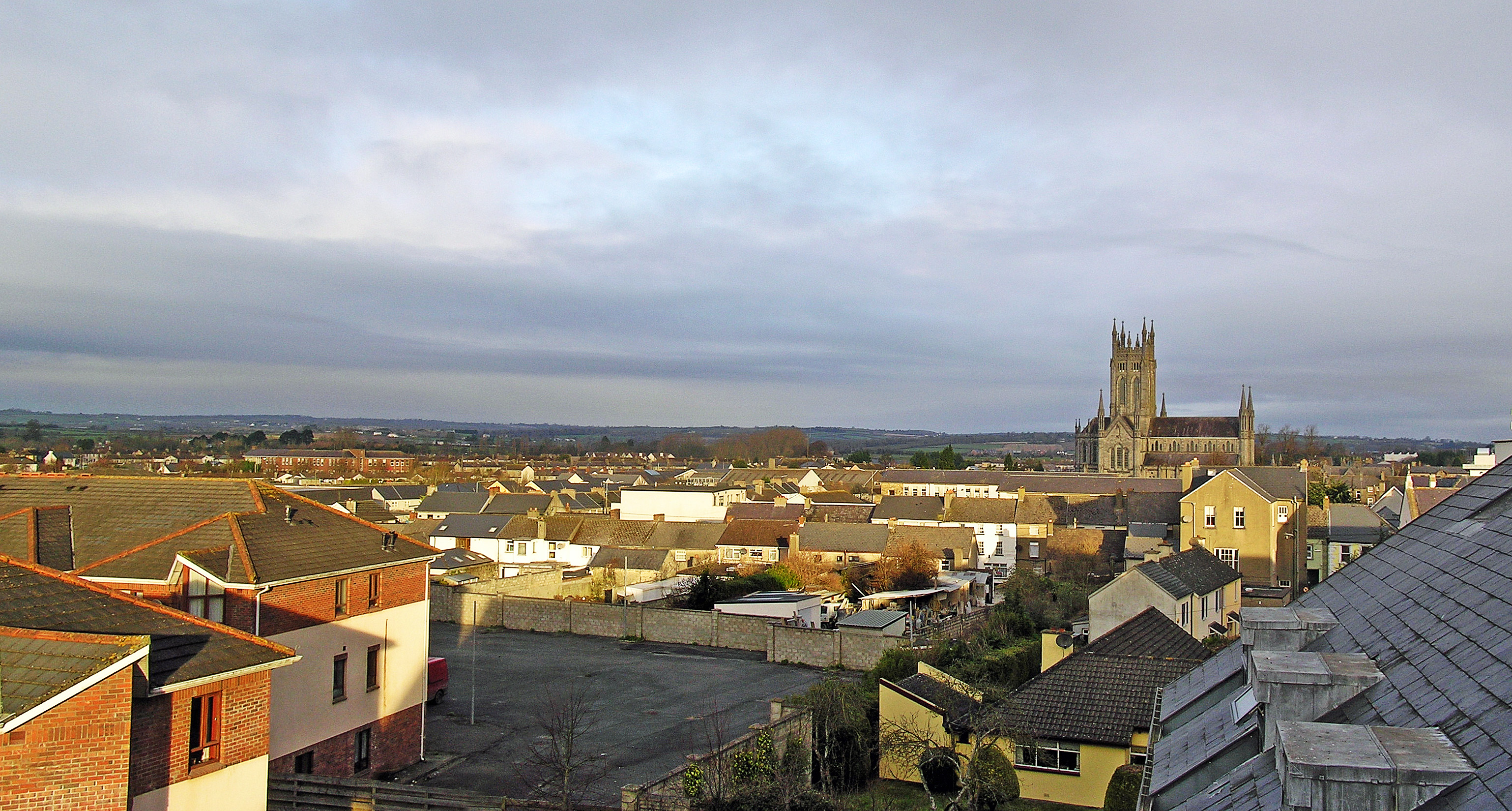
Kilkenny Panorama with St Mary's Cathedral at the background

King James I of England granted Kilkenny a royal charter conferring the status of a City in 1609. A 17th-century description of the City of Kilkenny lies in a manuscript called De Ossoriensi Dioescesi, which was a tract on the diocese of Ossory believed to be written by David Rothe the Roman Catholic Bishop of Ossory.

The manuscript translates from Latin as;

Seated on the river Nore, which flows beneath two marble bridges distant from each other about two furlongs, its greatest length is from north to south. On the north stands boldly forth the large and magnificent cathedral church sacred to St. Canice, the abbot; southwards, and verging towards the east, rises the castle, or rather fortress guarded by many castles and bulwarks. From this twofold source sprang the civic community -the temple and the fortress were the nurses of its infancy – the civil and ecclesiastical polities contributing equally to the growth of its buildings. To the inquirer as to the period of its foundation I reply that it is coeval with the English conquest of Ireland.

— - Anonymous, De Ossoriensi Dioescesi

Kilkenny is described as the City of Kilkenny or Kilkenny City but does not have a city council. The Local Government Act 2001 allows for the continued use of city;

"the continued use of the description city in relation to Kilkenny, to the extent that that description was used before the establishment day".

— - Local Government Act 2001

=== Jacobite and Williamite City ===
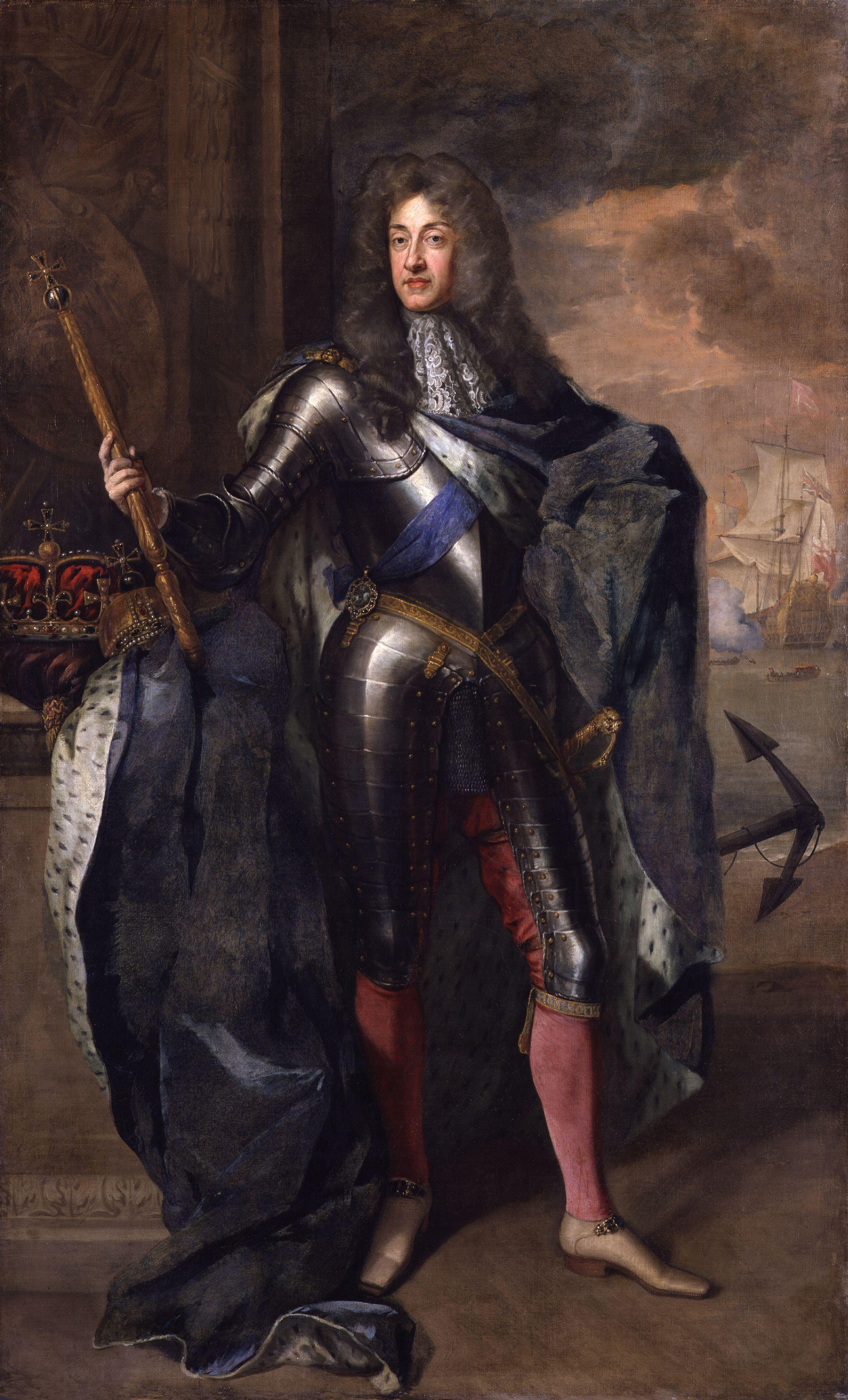
James II and VII King of England, Scotland, and Ireland, deposed by William in 1689, but supported by the mainly Catholic "Jacobites" in Ireland

James II of England's pro-Catholic and Pro-France policies provoked a revolt in England and the king fled to France. With the assistance of French troops in March 1689 James landed at Kinsale in Ireland and via Kilkenny went to Dublin. The Irish Parliament declared that James remained King and passed a massive bill of attainder against those who had rebelled against him. The Irish parliament declared the lands of Protestant supporters of William of Orange, such as James Butler, 2nd Duke of Ormonde, to be forfeit.

James II of England spent most of the winter months from November 1689 until January 1690 at Kilkenny, residing in the castle James worked to build an army in Ireland, but was ultimately defeated at the Battle of the Boyne on 1 July 1690 when William arrived, personally leading an army to defeat James and reassert English control. After James's defeat at the Battle of the Boyne, his retreating army passed through Kilkenny on its way to Limerick and forced the citizens to pay protection money to save the city from looting. James fled to France once more, departing from Kinsale, never to return to any of his former kingdoms.

Kilkenny surrendered to the Williamites without firing a shot, and the propertied Old English families, who had supported James, lost everything. The Williamite army, commanded by General Godert de Ginkel, camped beside Kilkenny making the city the winter headquarters from October 1690 until May 1691 when it moved on to besiege Limerick.

During the late 17th century James II had urged the Irish Parliament to pass an Act for Liberty of Conscience that granted religious freedom to all Catholics and Protestants in Ireland. He elevated the Catholic college into a university at the Royal College of St. Canice. It took over the premises of Ormonde's grammar school at Kilkenny College. Six months later, after James's defeat at the battle of the Boyne, the university was forced to close.

=== Lord Lieutenant of Kilkenny ===
The office of Lord Lieutenant of Kilkenny was created on 23 August 1831. James Butler, 1st Marquess of Ormonde, John Ponsonby, 4th Earl of Bessborough, William Frederick Fownes Tighe, James Butler, 3rd Marquess of Ormonde and Hamilton Cuffe, 5th Earl of Desart held that office.

== Modern history ==
Kilkenny won their first All-Ireland Hurling Title in 1904. John's Church was built from 1903 to 1908. In 1904, King Edward VII of the United Kingdom of Great Britain and Ireland and his wife Queen Alexandra visited Kilkenny. The city was filled with thousands of people. The King spoke of his deep interest in the Irish people and his desire to promote their welfare.

W. T. Cosgrave won a by-election in Kilkenny in 1917 for the Sinn Féin Party. In early May 1922 before the Irish Civil War there was a serious clash in Kilkenny, when anti-Treaty forces occupied the centre of the city and 200 pro-Treaty troops were sent from Dublin to disperse them. On 3 May the Dáil was informed that 18 men had been killed in the fighting in Kilkenny. In a bid to avoid an all-out civil war, both sides agreed to a truce on 3 May 1922. On 15 December 1922, the Irish Free State Kilkenny Barracks were reported to have overrun and captured by irregulars.

Kilkenny Castle was closed in 1935 and the Ormonde family left Ireland. The Kilkenny Design Workshops were opened in 1965 and in 1967 the Marquess of Ormonde presented Kilkenny Castle to the people of Kilkenny. Margaret Tynan became the first woman elected Mayor of Kilkenny.

A new stamp marking the 400th anniversary of Kilkenny's upgrade from town to city status was issued by An Post on 16 June 2009. The stamp features an illustration of Kilkenny Castle, as viewed from the quays, with St. John's Bridge in the foreground. In 2009, Mayor Malcolm Noonan became the first Green Party mayor. The Heritage Council (Ireland) offices were moved to Church Lane.

Today, the city has a lively cultural scene, with annual events including the Kilkenny Arts Week Festival in the last two weeks of August, and the Cat Laughs Comedy Festival at the beginning of June.

== See also ==
- Kilkenny
- County Kilkenny
