= William de Rodyard =

English-born judge and cleric in Ireland

William de Rodyard, de Rodiard, or de Rudyard (c.1275- c. 1349) was an English-born judge and cleric in fourteenth-century Ireland. He held office as Chief Justice of the Irish Common Pleas. He was also Dean of St Patrick's Cathedral, and briefly Deputy Lord Treasurer of Ireland. He was the first Chancellor of the Medieval University of Dublin (not to be confused with Trinity College Dublin, which was a much later foundation).

== Career ==
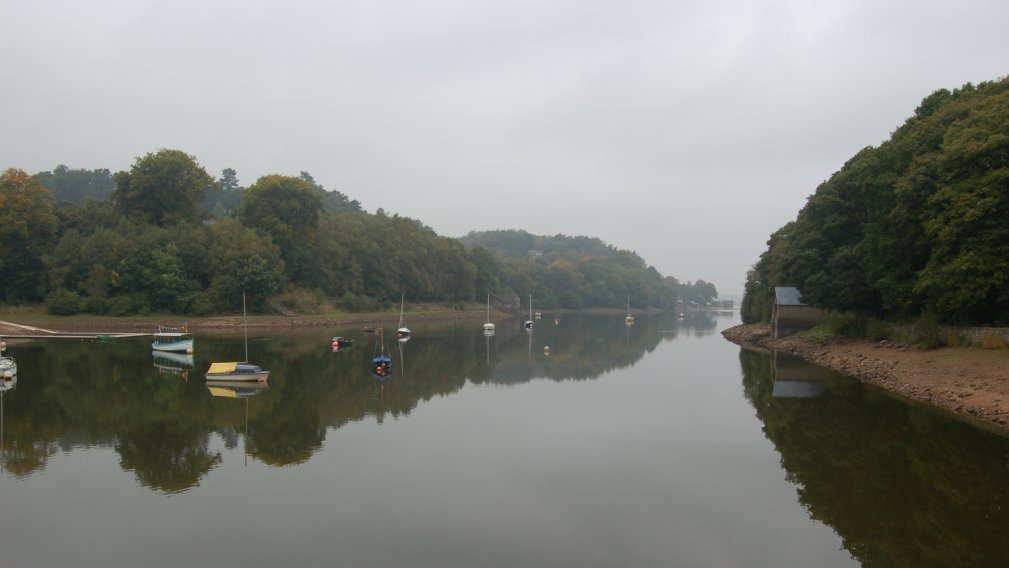
Rudyard Lake: William was probably born in nearby Rudyard village

Little is known of his background or his early life, although he was probably born in Rudyard, Staffordshire, and took his name from the village. A few official records give his first name as John. He was in holy orders, and must have been a university graduate since he was often termed "Magister (Master)", a title which was given at the time only to those with a University degree. It is unlikely that he would have been selected to head the new University if he did not have a degree.

He is first heard of in Dublin in 1307 as Treasurer of St Patrick's Cathedral, Dublin; he was elected Dean of St Patrick's in 1312, and apparently served in that capacity until his elevation to the Bench in 1327. He already had considerable practical experience of the duties of Dean, as his predecessor Thomas de Chaddesworth had been in failing health for some time prior to his death in 1311 (he had been in the Crown service for 50 years), and William had acted as his deputy.

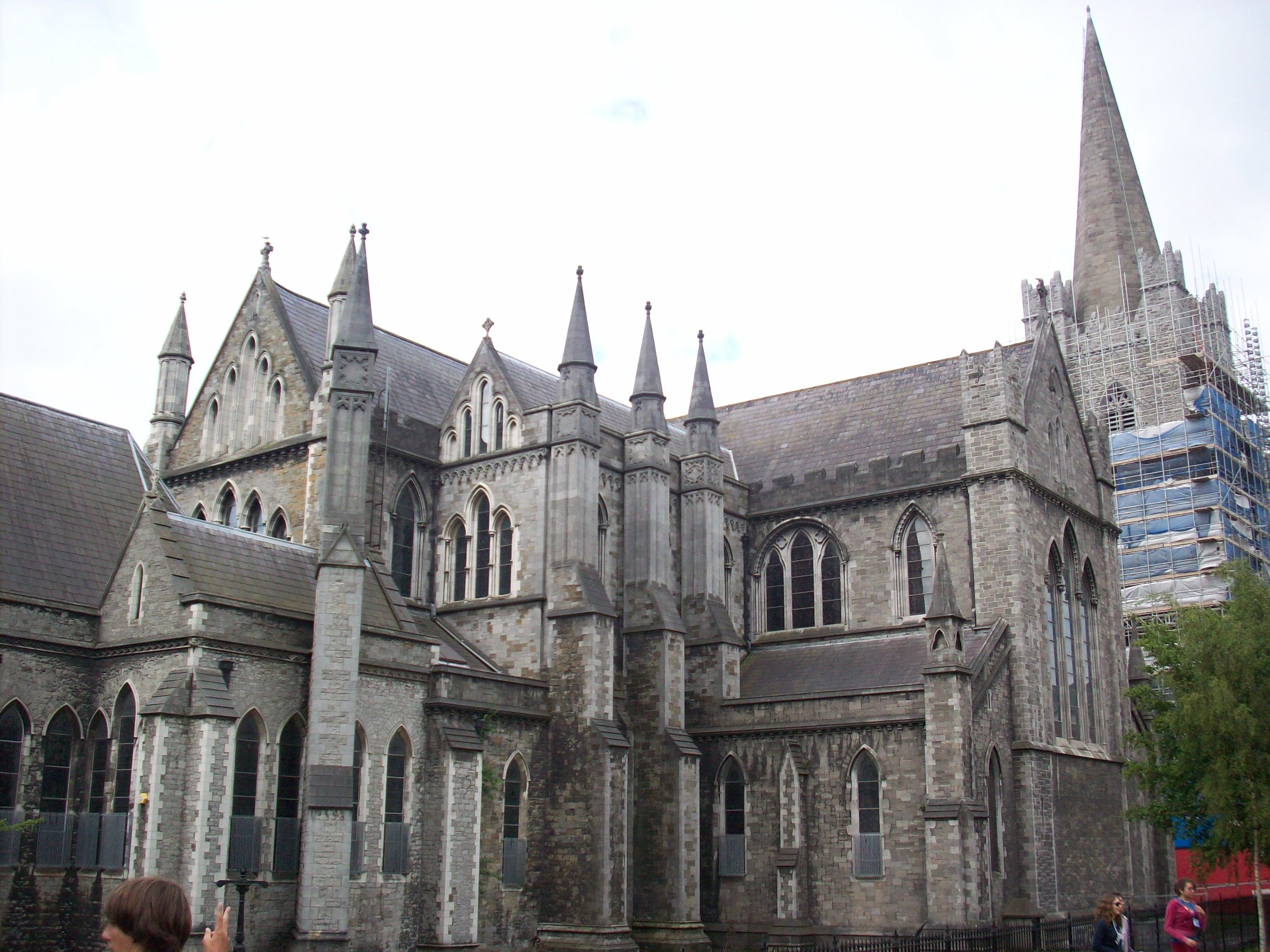
St. Patrick's Cathedral, Dublin: Rodyard was Treasurer and subsequently Dean of the Cathedral

From the sketchy information we have about his personality, he seems to have been an able administrator and a man who was "learned in the law". He acted for a time as an itinerant justice. He played a considerable part in the defence of Dublin during the Bruce campaign in Ireland in 1315-18, and later excommunicated the leaders of the Bruce invasion, together with those clergy who had supported them.

== Candidate for Archbishop of Dublin ==
In 1311 he was one of the three Cathedral canons nominated for the office of Archbishop of Dublin, the others being Alexander de Bicknor, the former Lord Treasurer of Ireland, and Walter de Thornbury, the Lord Chancellor of Ireland. William, however, withdrew his name from the running, and the death of Thornbury, who drowned while on his way to the Papal Court at Avignon to lobby for his own appointment, "as if Heaven had promulgated its judgment" in the words of a nineteenth-century historian, left Bicknor the undisputed choice as Archbishop. Bicknor could by all accounts be a difficult and quarrelsome individual, but his relations with Rodyard seem to have been amicable enough.

== Kilkenny witch trials ==
He became a Doctor of Civil Law in 1320. In 1324 he was sent to Kilkenny to sit as one of the judges at the witch trials of the celebrated Witch of Kilkenny, Alice Kyteler and her associates. He granted Alice bail, thus enabling her and one of her co-accused, Basilia, to flee the country, although her servant Petronilla de Meath was burned at the stake.

Later, in 1328/9, he presided over the high-powered Commission of inquiry which cleared Alice's brother-in-law Roger Utlagh, Prior of Kilmainham, and others, of any wrongdoing, despite the accusations levelled against them by the Bishop of Ossory, Richard de Ledrede, the moving force behind the witch hunt. In particular, Ledrede alleged they had connived at the escape of Alice and Basilia. Ledrede made no accusations against Rodyard himself, even though it was he who had granted the fugitives bail.

== Papal legate ==
In about 1328 he was appointed papal legate, with a specific brief to inquire into the conduct of the Irish Franciscans, whose loyalty to the English Crown had been suspected ever since the Bruce invasion of 1315-18. In due course he reported that the loyalty of many of the Gaelic-born friars was doubtful, and that they were "a danger to the King's peace". He recommended that with a few exceptions the rebellious friars be distributed among the Franciscan Order's other Monasteries and that in future no Irish-born friar should be appointed to a position of authority.

== Later life ==
He became a justice of the Court of Common Pleas (Ireland) in 1327. He was appointed Chief Justice of the Irish Common Pleas in 1329, but served for only two years, although he was praised for his diligence in carrying out his official duties. He was briefly deputy to the Lord Treasurer of Ireland in 1331. He was reappointed Chief Justice in 1335, but apparently served for only a short time. He was dead by 1349.

== Medieval University of Dublin ==
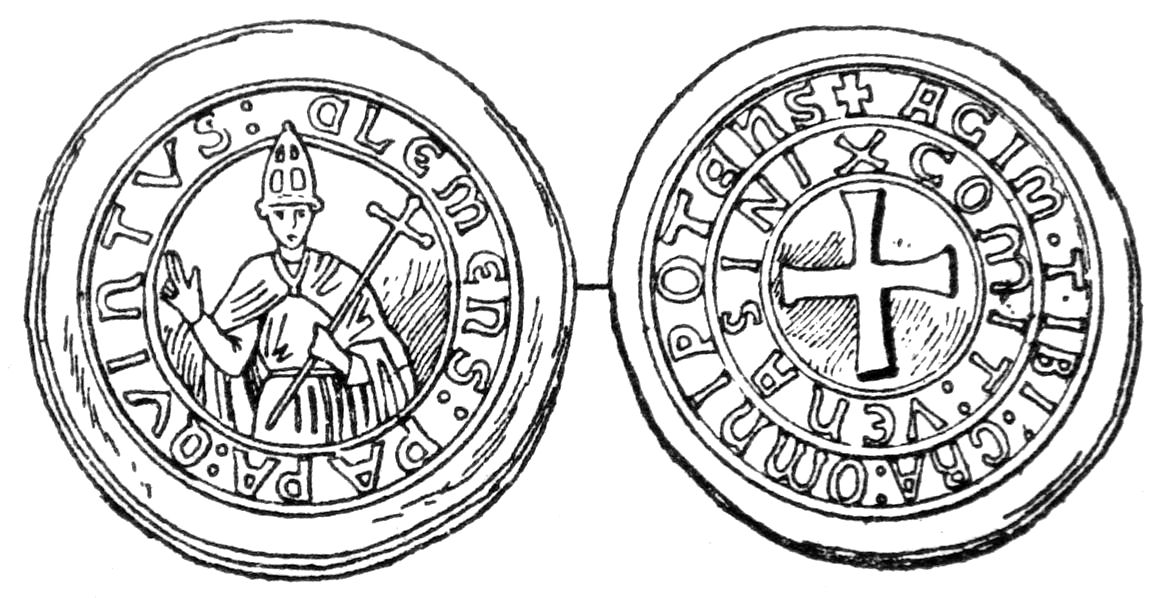
Coin of Pope Clement V (r.1305-14) who in 1311 granted a Papal Brief to found a University in Dublin

Pope Clement V issued a Papal brief in 1311 for the foundation of a new University in Dublin, but the project was hampered from the beginning by inadequate funds, and the University did not open until 1320. From the beginning it was closely associated with St Patrick's Cathedral, and de Rodyard, as Dean of St. Patrick's, was the obvious choice to be the first chancellor. Michael Hardy was the first Master.

Although a number of Chairs were endowed, including chairs of Theology and Law, the University, due to lack of proper financial and political support, never flourished, and it was suppressed at the Reformation. The present University of Dublin was founded in 1592.
