= Highhays Ware =

Medieval pottery

Highhays Ware is a term used for medieval pottery produced at the Highhays pottery site in Kilkenny, Ireland. It was previously referred to as "Kilkenny-type ware". The pottery found during the excavations at the site included jugs, cooking pots, storage jars, money boxes, parts of pottery like spouts and ridge tiles or parts thereof, in total "42 sherds of [...] pottery and 160 ridge-tile fragments" from the kiln alone.

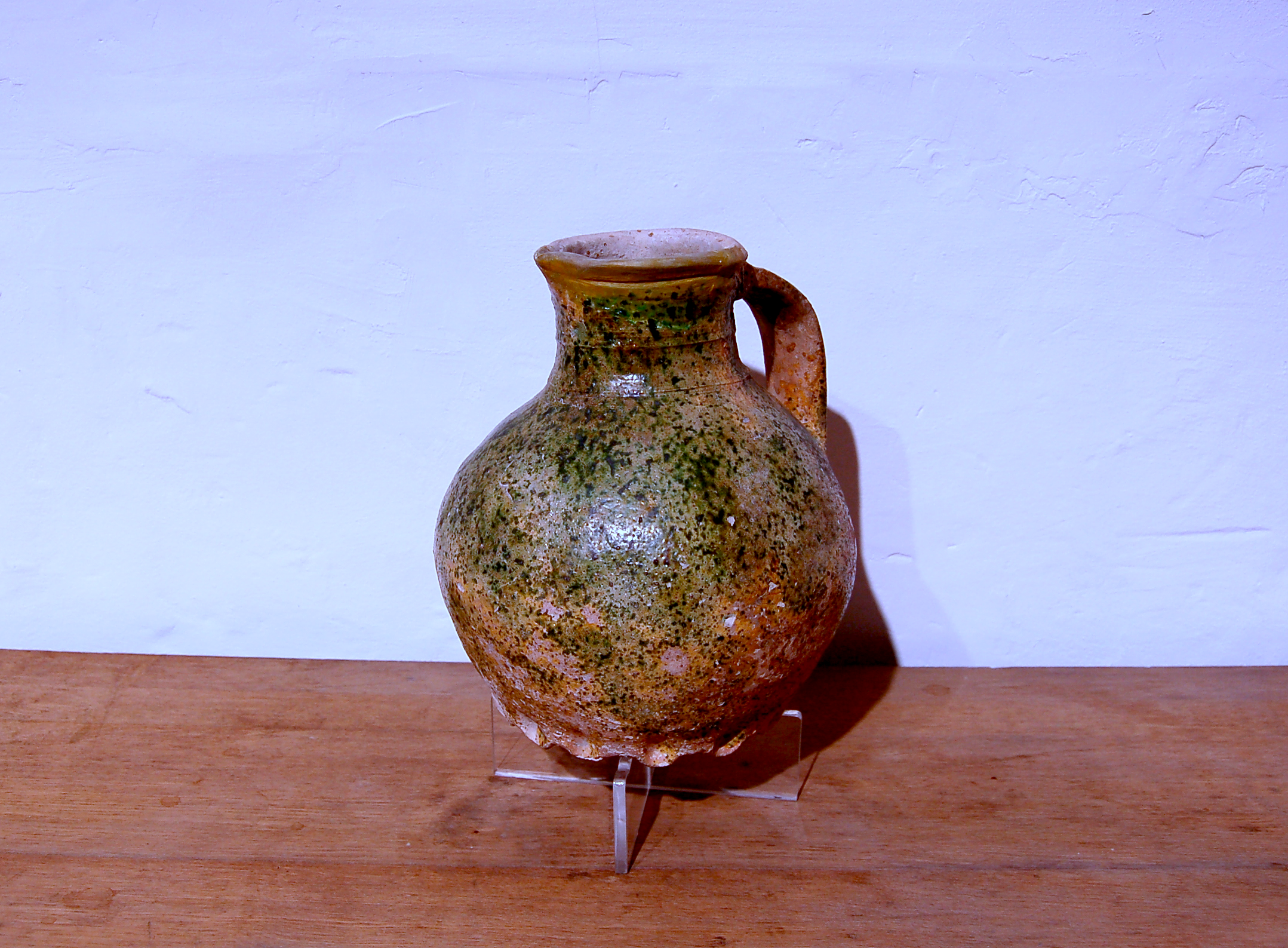
Castleinch Jug, found in Castleinch townland, an example of Highhays Ware

== Historic context for Irish pottery ==
For c. 2,000 years before the Anglo-Norman arrival in Ireland in the late 12th century, there was almost no local pottery activity on the island; people used wood-turned, stave-built and metal vessels instead. Once the Anglo-Normans settled in Ireland, they imported wares from across the Celtic Sea as well as the continent, especially the Bordeaux region in France. However, they needed to produce pottery locally, so they had Anglo-Norman potters settle in Ireland who then produced ceramics on an industrial scale. (At a site in Drogheda, for example, archaeologists discovered 670,000 sherds left in the pottery kilns.)

The potters left their thumbprints in the pottery when adding strap handles by thumbing and by thumbing the bases of pots. The Highhays potters also left traces in the Kilkenny's legal records of the 14th century under the family name of "Crocker" or "le Crokkere".

This period of ceramics production on the island only lasted for about 200 years spanning the 13th and 14th century, only to be revived in the 18th century.

It is presumed that the Black Death and subsequent changes and challenges in the social structure of urban and suburban areas in Ireland led to the end of the Highhays pottery site as well as other urban pottery sites (Downpatrick, Carrickfergus, Drogheda, Dundalk).

== Characteristics of Highhays Ware ==
The firing of the kiln was dated using archaeomagnetic dating and bootstrapping to have occurred between 1325 and 1375.

The clay for the fine Highhays Creamy ware was determined to have come from the Castlecomer area of County Kilkenny along the banks of the River Dinin, using Inductively Coupled Plasma Spectrometry & Petrological analysis.

Most of the pottery at Highhays was wheel-thrown.

The aim at Highhays for the finer ware termed Highhays Creamy ware was to produce reduced ware by blocking out oxygen from the kiln which results is an off-white (rather than orange) colour of the first firing.

In its end product, it often shows a green lead and copper glaze on the outside (like the Castleinch Jug in the photograph) with a white or buff surface, where it is unglazed. Other examples, like one from Gowran, have a brown glaze.

The name for the coarser pottery produced at Highhays is Redcliffe ware or Redcliffe Coarse ware.

The strap handles were often decorated with incisions presumable made by the thumbnails of the potter. Some are symmetrical, others have a freer pattern.

== Distribution of Highhays Ware ==
Highhays Ware, or as it was formerly known as, Kilkenny-type ware, in its subtypes Highhays Creamy ware and Redcliffe ware has been found at monastic and urban sites throughout Co. Kilkenny (Black Abbey, Kilkenny High Street, Kilkenny Patrick Street, Kilkenny Castle, Rothe House, Castleinch, Dysart, Gowran, Newtown Jerpoint, Kilferagh, Kells Priory etc. as well as at The Bullawn and Dunbrody Abbey in Co. Wexford.

Other ware found in and around Kilkenny which are not Highhays Ware include Saintonge Ware and Leinster Ware.
