= Roger Utlagh =

Irish cleric, judge and politician

Roger Utlagh, or Roger Outlawe (c. 1260 – 1341) was a leading Irish cleric, judge and statesman of the fourteenth century who was Prior of Kilmainham, and held the office of Lord Chancellor of Ireland. He was the brother-in-law of the celebrated Witch of Kilkenny, Alice Kyteler, and is mainly remembered today for his efforts to shield her from prosecution, and subsequently enabling her to escape punishment, during the Kilkenny Witch Trials of 1324.

== Biography ==
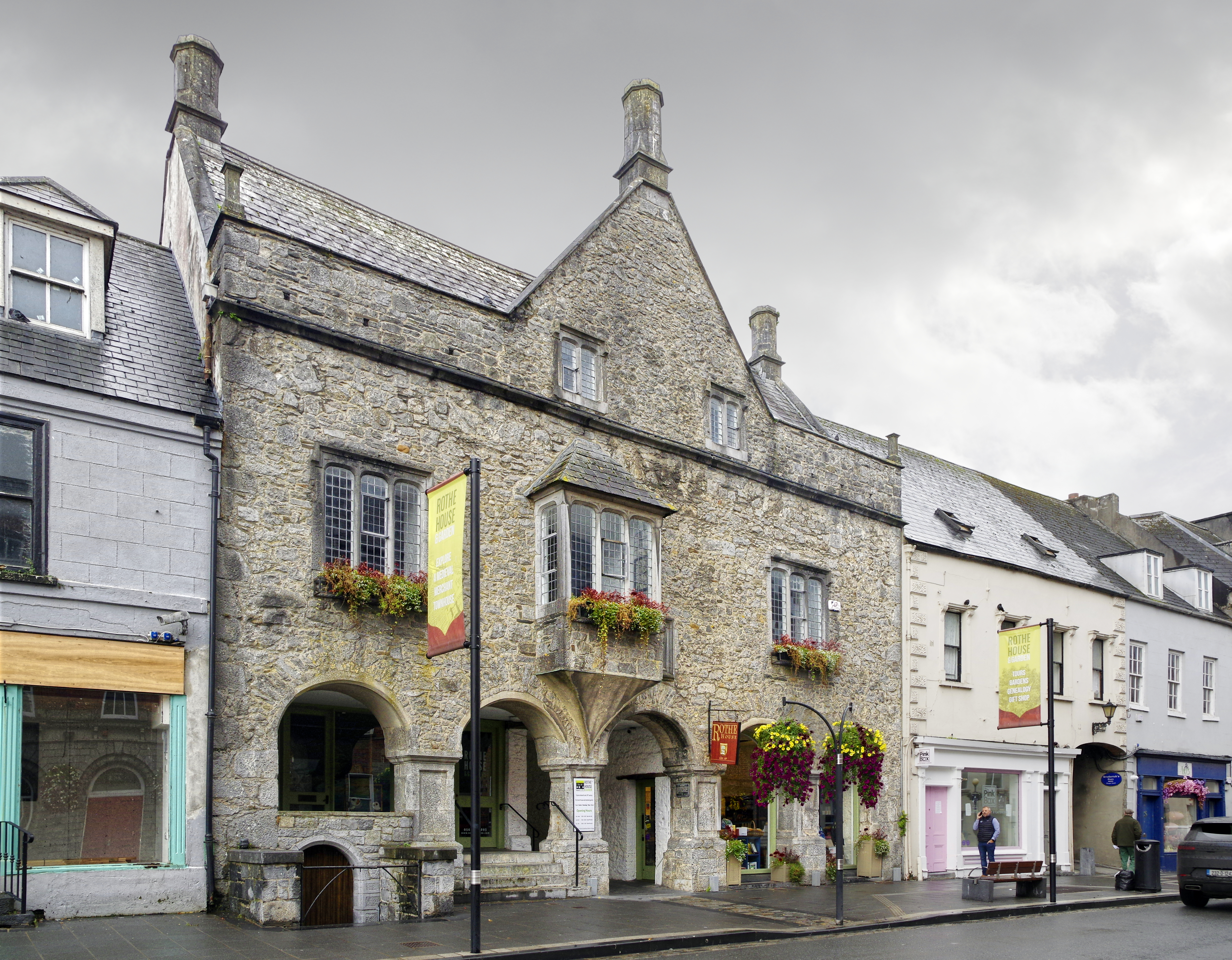
Kilkenny city, where Roger was born

He was born in Kilkenny: the Outlawe or Utlagh family were prominent merchants of Kilkenny city ("Utlagh" or "Utluighe" was a medieval Gaelic word for outlaw, though it was apparently not in common use). His brother William was Mayor of Kilkenny around 1301: William is best remembered as the first husband of Alice Kyteler, a connection which caused Roger great trouble in later life.

Roger joined the Order of the Knights Hospitallers: they were a military order, and Roger served as a military commander with the English army against the Scots, in which capacity he is said to have given good service to the Crown; he also helped to organise the defence of Dublin during the Bruce Campaign in Ireland. As a reward his Order received lands at Chapelizod. He became Prior of the Order's house at Kilmainham in 1317: as such he was entitled to sit in Parliament, where he soon acquired a reputation as an able statesman. He was appointed Lord Chancellor of Ireland in 1321 and served till 1325; between 1320 and his death in 1341 he frequently acted as Justiciar or Deputy Justiciar, and convened Parliament in 1328/9. At the same time, he was fully involved in the affairs of the Priory of Kilmainham and is said to have done much to increase its revenues. He died at the Order's house in County Limerick, which gave its name to the present-day town of Hospital.

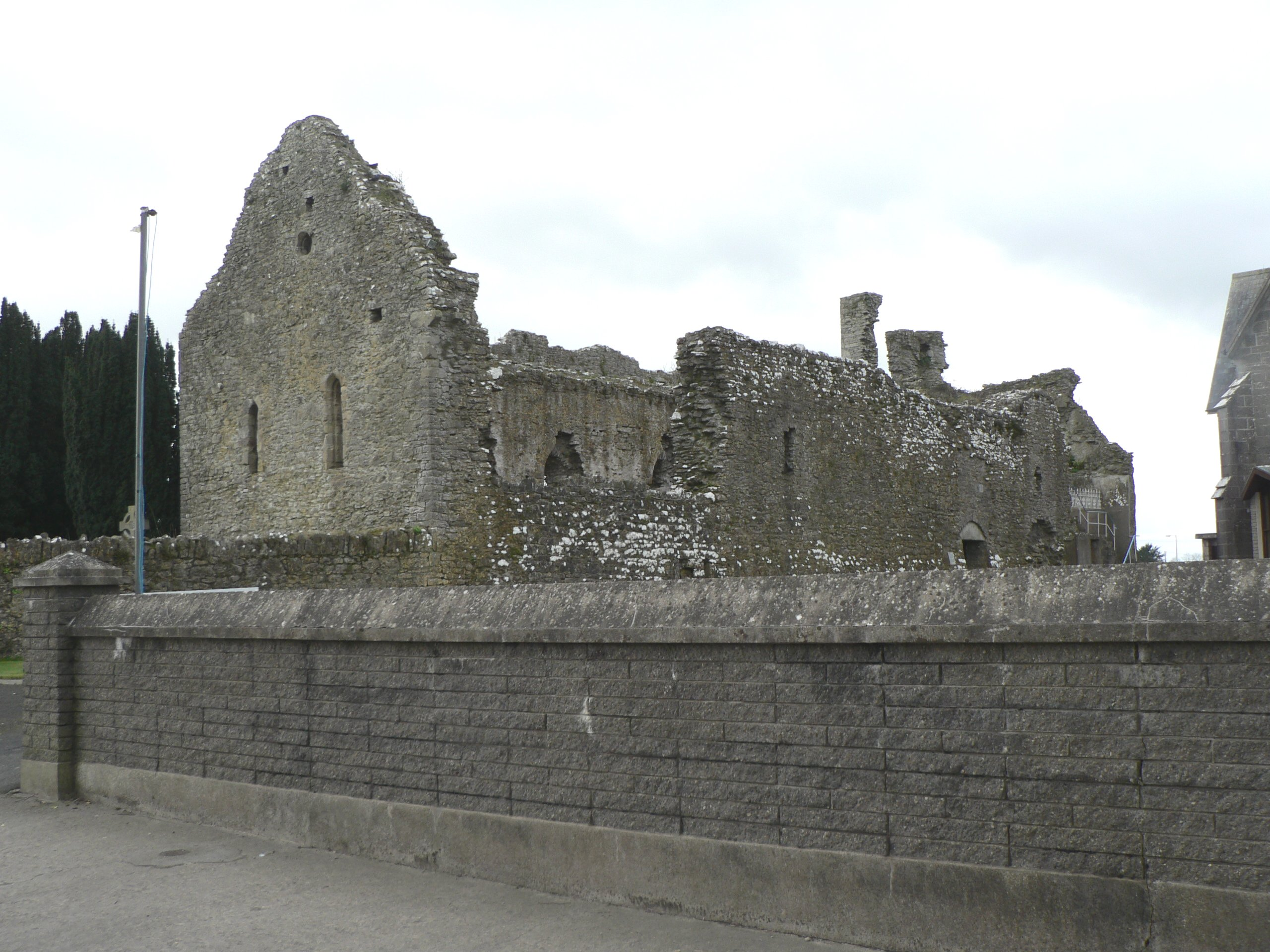
Hospital, County Limerick, where Roger died in 1341

In 1323 he warned King Edward II that he was in danger from Roger Mortimer, 1st Earl of March. Nonetheless, after Mortimer's usurpation, Roger was able to work with him and enjoyed his trust, as he was later to enjoy the trust of Edward III.

== Kilkenny Witch Trials ==
In 1324, while he was Lord Chancellor, Roger became both personally and politically involved in the Kilkenny Witch Trials. The Bishop of Ossory, Richard de Ledrede, a noted "scourge of witches and heretics", accused a number of prominent local citizens of witchcraft; the alleged leaders of the coven were Roger's sister-in-law Alice Kyteler and her son William Outlawe junior. In the circumstances the Bishop's request that the Chancellor should arrest members of his own family was a strange one. Roger, who was described by O'Flanagan as a man who was "not so credulous as others, or [more] willing to befriend his relatives" advised that forty days must elapse before an arrest could be made. When the Bishop refused to be persuaded to drop the case he was arrested himself, almost certainly with the Chancellor's connivance, and imprisoned for seventeen days.

Undeterred by his imprisonment, Ledrede on his release from prison made a second request that Roger arrest the suspects; at the same time, he ignored a summons from the Chancellor to appear before his Court to justify putting his diocese under an interdict. Despite Roger's efforts to frustrate the proceedings the Bishop persuaded the Justiciar of Ireland, John Darcy, 1st Baron Darcy de Knayth, to put the alleged witches on trial. Roger is said to have been present at the trials, but any efforts he made to secure the acquittal of the accused were in vain: all of them were found guilty. Alice managed to escape from prison and flee the country, no doubt with her brother-in-law's help, but William was sentenced to do penance and another of the accused, Petronella de Meath, was burnt at the stake. Petronella's daughter Basilia escaped with Alice.

Ledrede now decided to attack the Chancellor himself, and in 1328 accused him of heresy. This proved to be a serious error of judgment: Roger was a trusted servant of the Crown and was generally liked and respected; no-one except Ledrede believed that he was guilty of anything but a quite understandable desire to help his family. Roger sensibly insisted on a full inquiry: a Commission of Inquiry was appointed, headed by William de Rodyard, later Chief Justice of the Irish Common Pleas, and including most of the senior clergy, magnates and gentry of the Pale, which invited witnesses to appear and make any charges they wished. While some witnesses did testify against Roger, the report of the commission was that he was a zealous and orthodox champion of the Christian faith. Roger celebrated his vindication by treating the citizens of Dublin to a public banquet.

== Later years ==
He continued to play a leading role in public affairs until shortly before his death. The Parliament he convened in 1328/9 was aimed at reconciling the rival factions among the nobility, and persuading them to control their followers, and had some short-term success. The dominant figure then among the Irish nobility was Maurice FitzGerald, 1st Earl of Desmond, of whose troublesome conduct Roger has already given an account to the Crown in 1327 while visiting Westminster. In 1331 Desmond, with a number of other nobles, was arrested and imprisoned on suspicion, probably unfounded, that he was aiming to make himself ruler of Ireland. Roger as Justiciar was personally in charge of the arrest. It was however felt unwise to proceed to extremes against Desmond. Roger accordingly was given the power to treat "all those making war against the King", and an order was issued that no magnate be executed for treason. He was heavily involved in the preparations for the visit of King Edward III to Ireland, which never took place. In 1335 Roger was negotiating with the Irish clans in Ulster and elsewhere.

== Character ==
O'Flanagan praises Roger as a man of great learning and ability and a gifted statesman, and notes that despite the attack on his character by Bishop de Ledrede, he emerged from the Kilkenny Witch Trials with his career undamaged and his reputation even higher than before. In his own time, he was praised as a "prudent and gracious man" who earned the favour of the King.
