= Red Book of Ossory =

Medieval manuscript from Ireland

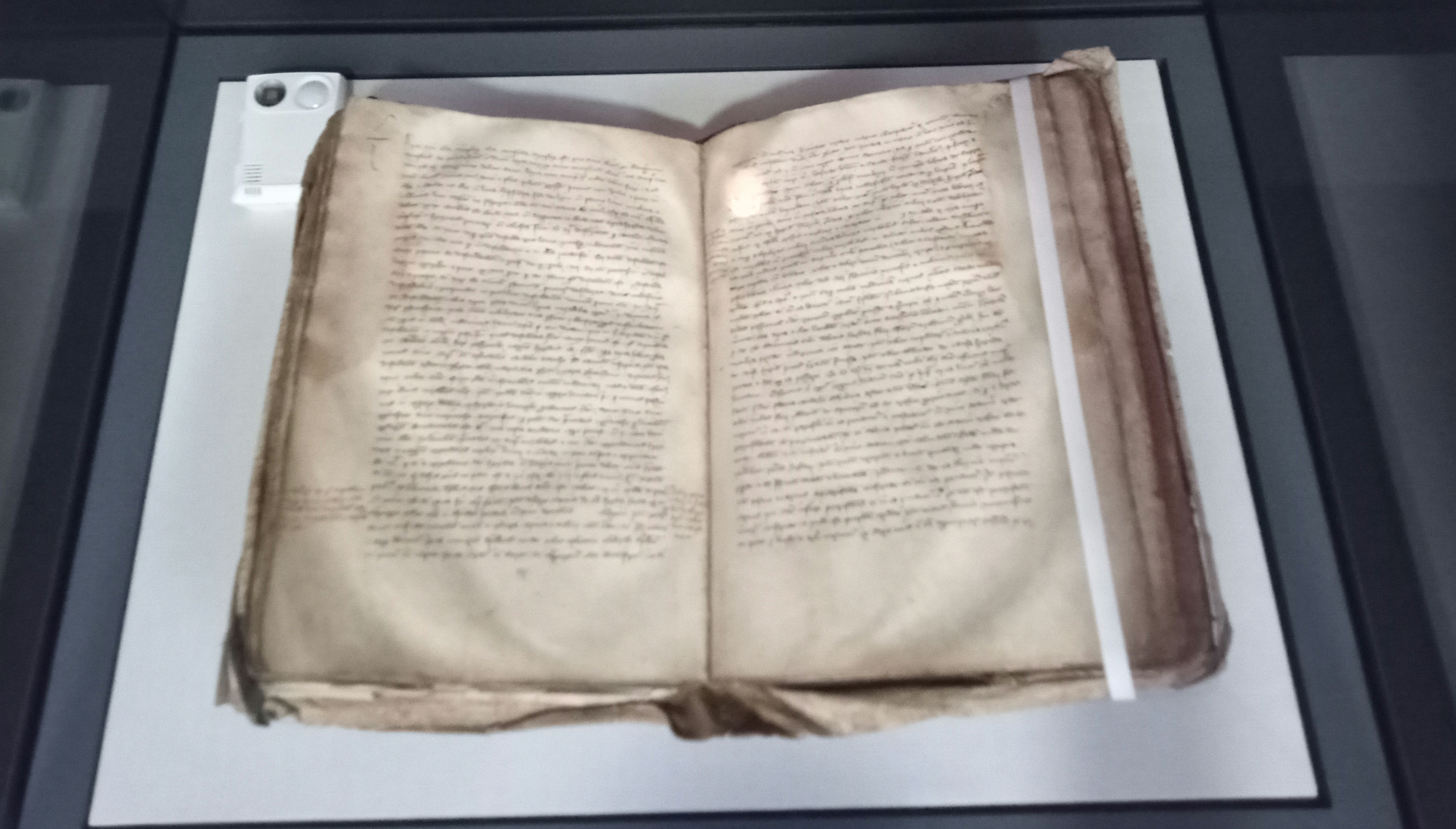

The Red Book of Ossory (Latin Liber Rubrum Ossoriensis) is a medieval manuscript produced in Kilkenny, Ireland, and usually kept in the Representative Church Body Library in Dublin.

On 82 folios, the manuscript contains a number of texts in Latin, Middle English (Note: The exhibition claims it to be Old English, but that had developed into Middle English by the 12th century.) and in Anglo-Norman. The sixth gathering of the MS contains the Proverbes de bon enseignement by Nicholas Bozon. The Latin religious lyrics in the manuscript were intended to replace more secular songs in the vernacular, and were mostly composed by Richard de Ledrede, Bishop of Ossory.

It is on display at St Canice's Cathedral since July 29 2024, the purchase of a ticket to visit the Cathedral and see the exhibition is required. It is planned to change the display of pages every three months; the first part on display is the recipe for aqua vite. Later, a letter from King Edward III, an early provision of the Magna Carta, and poems and songs composed by Bishop Ledrede will be shown.

The manuscript has been digitized and is available online.
