= Richard de Ledrede =

English bishop of Ossory in Ireland

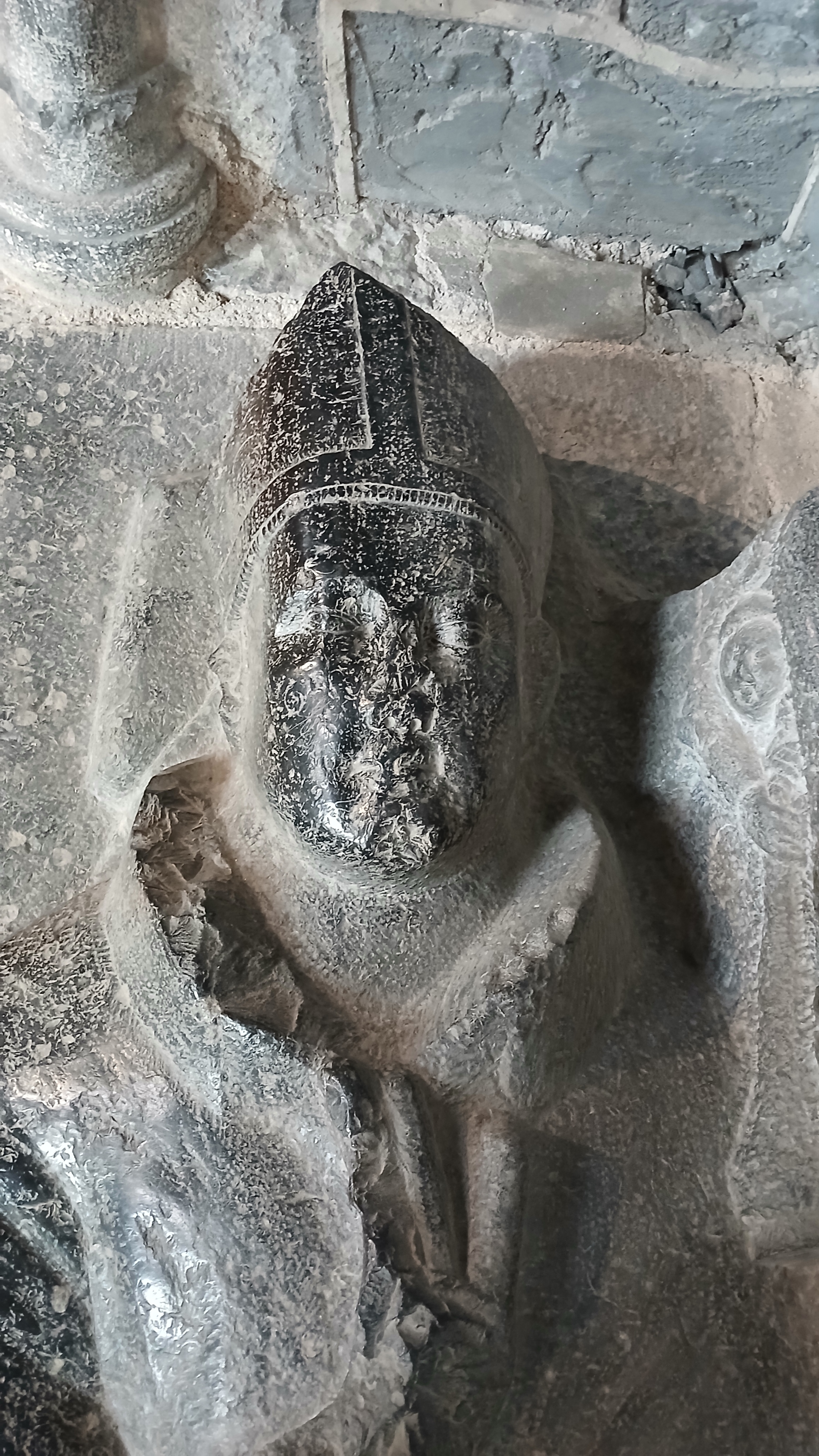
Effigy of Richard Ledrede in St Canice's Cathedral, Kilkenny

Richard de Ledrede (died 1360/1361), also known as Richard Ledred, was a 14th-century churchman in Ireland who served as Bishop of Ossory. His long tenure as bishop was marked by bitter controversies and repeated quarrels with his colleagues, both lay and clerical.

== Life ==
Richard was probably born between about 1260 and 1270. A report of c.1356 that he was by that date a centenarian is believed to be an exaggeration, although he was certainly so advanced in years that his fitness to perform his duties was questioned. His name is thought to relate to Leatherhead in Surrey, England, but this may be misleading: other evidence suggests a family connection with the county of Somerset.

A Franciscan of the Order of Friars Minor, he served as Bishop of Ossory from May 1317 until his death in 1360/1361.

== Kilkenny witch trials ==
Ledrede was known as a "scourge of heresy and witchcraft", and was a central figure in the Kilkenny witch trials of 1324, when among the accused were Alice Kyteler and her servant Petronella de Meath. Petronella was burnt at the stake, but Alice contrived to break out of prison and flee the country, almost certainly with the assistance of her brother-in-law Roger Utlagh (or Outlawe), the Lord Chancellor of Ireland, who had always maintained her innocence. The two men quarrelled bitterly about Ledrede's conduct of the Trials: Roger joined with the Seneschal of Kilkenny, Andrew le Poer, and others in having the Bishop imprisoned for a time, and the Bishop after his release in turn tried unsuccessfully to have Roger tried for heresy. This resulted in a humiliating defeat for Ledrede when a Commission of Inquiry, which was headed by William de Rodyard, a future Chief Justice of the Irish Common Pleas and included most of the magnates of Ireland, both lay and clerical, declared Roger to be a pious and zealous Christian, and cleared him entirely of any suggestion of heresy.

Ledrede was in turn summoned before the Irish Privy Council to justify his actions, and also to account for certain charges he had made against Alexander de Bicknor, Archbishop of Dublin, but instead he fled the country in order to plead his case at the Papal Court. Bicknor followed him there to argue his side of the case. Bicknor enjoyed the goodwill of King Edward III, who sent a message to the Papal Court describing Ledrede ominously as a man notorious for stirring up rebellion, and urging them not to believe anything he said. Following mediation by the Curia, the two clerics were persuaded to drop their accusations against each other. However further differences arose between them in later years, in particular over Bicknor's sheltering of heretics who had fled from persecution in the Diocese of Ossory.

== Other controversies ==
Ledrede again incurred the royal displeasure in 1355–56 when he excommunicated William de Bromley, the Lord Treasurer of Ireland, apparently in order to prevent him from collecting the King's revenue in the diocese, resulting in a serious financial loss to the Crown. The Bishop, realising that he had blundered, made a humble submission to the King and was pardoned.

Ledrede also pursued a vendetta against Arnold le Poer, the Seneschal of Kilkenny, who had also defended Alice Kyteler, and like Roger, was a relative of Alice by marriage. The two men had always detested each other, and Ledrede had a personal grudge against le Poer, as it was le Poer who had arrested and imprisoned him, probably at Roger Utlagh's bidding. Less fortunate than Utlagh and Bicknor, le Poer was imprisoned, and died in prison in 1331 while awaiting trial for heresy.

== Later life and legacy ==
Ledrede's last years seem to have been peaceful enough, and were mainly occupied in making improvements to St Canice's Cathedral. In his last years, an effort was made by the Archbishop of York, John of Thoresby, to replace him on the grounds of his great age, but it was evidently decided to leave him in peace until he died.

Sixty short Latin hymns by him are preserved in the Red Book of Ossory.

== Works ==
- Colledge, Edmund, ed. (1974). The Latin Poems of Richard Ledrede, OFM, Bishop of Ossory, 1317–1360. Pontifical Institute of Mediaeval Studies, Studies and Texts. Vol. 30. Toronto: Pontifical Institute of Mediaeval Studies.
- Stemmler, Theo, ed. (1975). The Latin Hymns of Richard Ledrede. Poetria Mediaevalis. Vol. 1. Mannheim.
