= Highhays (archaeological site) =

Archaeological site in Kilkenny, Ireland

Coordinates: 52.65462°N 7.24537°W

- Interactive map of Highhays
- Type: industrial site
- Periods: Middle Ages
- Location: Highhays, Kilkenny

Site notes
- Archaeologists: Emma Devine, Cóilín Ó Drisceoil
- Condition: covered
- Website: excavations.ie/report/2006/Kilkenny/0015798/

Highhays is a townland and the location of a 14th-century medieval pottery site in Kilkenny, Ireland.

The pottery was discovered in 2006 during excavations led by the late Emma Devine and Cóilín Ó Drisceoil. The excavations revealed a previously unknown suburb of Kilkenny which appeared to be the location of an industrial site dedicated to pottery. Amongst the 9,000 finds were a firing kiln, sherds of pottery, a ring-brooch, an ear scoop and decorated buckles. The type of pottery produced there has since been attributed the name Highhays Ware. It is found throughout Kilkenny city as well as other towns and castle sites in the southeast of Ireland, along the Rivers Nore and Barrow.

The 2022 publication "Highhays, Kilkenny: A Medieval Pottery Production Centre in South-East Ireland" describes the excavation and finds in much detail.

== Gallery ==
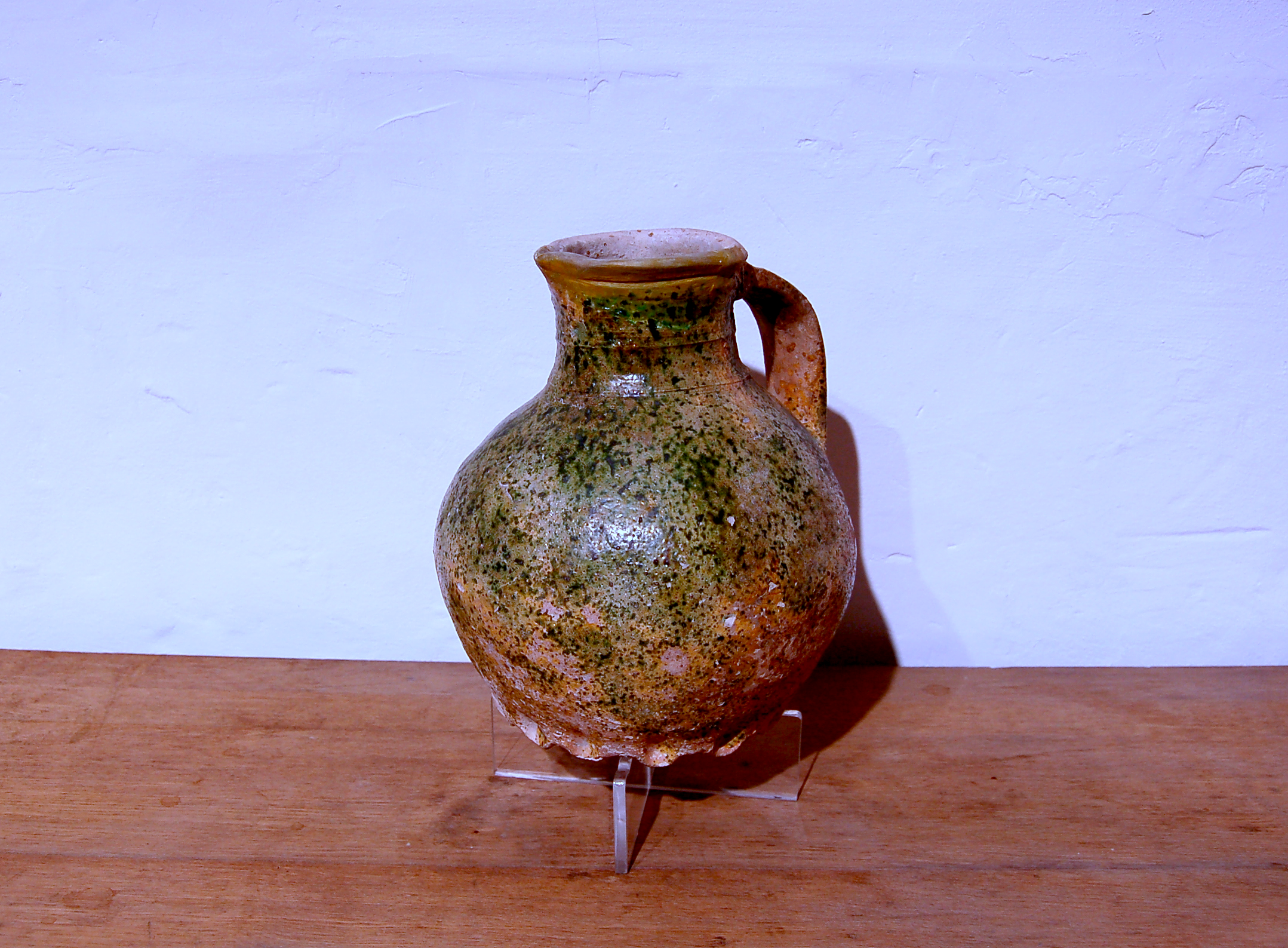
Castleinch Jug, on display in Rothe House

== Further information ==
- Highhays, Kilkenny: A Medieval Pottery Production Centre in South-East Ireland, Oxbow Press, 2022. ISBN 9781789258530.
- Cóilín Ó Drisceoil: Highhays, Kilkenny - A Fourteenth Century Pottery-Making Site (lecture on YouTube)
