= David Rothe =

David Rothe (1573 – 20 April 1650) was a Roman Catholic Bishop of Ossory.

== Life ==
David Rothe was born in 1573 in High Street Kilkenny. His maternal grandmother, Ellen Butler, was first cousin to Pierce the Red, Eighth Earl of Ormond. He studied at the Irish College, Douai, and at the University of Salamanca, where he graduated doctor in civil and canon law. He was ordained in 1600, and proceeded to Rome. From 1601 to 1609 he was professor of theology and secretary to Peter Lombard (Archbishop of Armagh), and on 15 June 1609, was appointed Vice-Primate of Armagh.

Having been made prothonotary Apostolic, Rothe arrived in Ireland in 1610. He resided part of the time in Kilkenny City, and part of the time in Balleen, with his cousin Richard Butler, 3rd Viscount Mountgarret. One of his first tasks was to resolve disputes between secular (parish) and religious (such as the Cistercians) clergy over faculties and jurisdiction. Rothe held a synod for the Ulster Province at Drogheda, in February, 1614, and a second synod in 1618. Rothe was under close government surveillance, and the fact that he was not either imprisoned or banished was probably due to Lord Mountgarret and other powerful friends.

Rothe was appointed Bishop of Ossory on 10 October 1618. At that the time the archbishops of Ireland, (Armagh, Tuam, Cashel, and Dublin) were all in exile on the Continent. Owing to the severity of the penal laws, he had to seek consecration in Paris, where he was ordained bishop 1 April 1619. He returned to Ireland in late 1621, after publishing two ecclesial works. Rothe became the most prominent bishop in Ireland.

In 1624, Rothe presided over a synod at Kilkenny, and he laboured zealously during a trying period. Rothe’s prominence in the country and the relatively peaceful state of Kilkenny led to the Confederate ‘parliament’ meeting in the city in the 1642, and welcomed the papal nuncio, Rinuccini, to Kilkenny, on 14 November 1645. Three years later, he refused to acknowledge the validity of the censures issued by Rinuccini. Rothe, like other bishops appointed during Lombard's tenure, tended to be more moderate toward state authority. Although seriously ill in 1649, he continued to minister to the plague-stricken citizens of Kilkenny but was compelled by the Cromwellians to leave on 28 March 1650. After being robbed along the way, he was permitted to return to his brother's house, where he died 20 April 1650. His remains were interred in St. Mary's Church, but there is a cenotaph to his memory in St. Canice's Cathedral.

== Works ==
His most noted work is the Analecta, the first part of which is an account of the persecution of Catholics in Ireland during the deputyship of Arthur Chichester, 1st Baron Chichester. As early as 1616, Rothe had published the first part of his Analecta and the completed work was issued at Cologne (1617–19); a new edition was brought out by Patrick F. Moran in 1884. In 1620 he published Brigida Thaumaturga at Paris, followed by Hiberniae sive Antiquioris Scotiae in 1621 at Antwerp, and Hibernia Resurgens at Paris, also in 1621. He also left a manuscript, Hierographia Hiberniae.

== Sources ==
- Carrigan, William, History of Ossory (Dublin 1905); Report on Franciscan MSS. in Hist. MSS. Com. (Dublin, 1906)
- Lynch, De praesulibus Hiberniae (1672)
- Ware, De praesulibus Hiberniae (Dublin, 1665)
- C. P. Meehan, Franciscan Monasteries (Dublin, 1872)
- Moran, Spicilegium Ossoriense (Dublin, 1874–84)
