= Alice Kyteler =

Person accused of witchcraft

- Born: c. 1260; County Kilkenny, Leinster, Ireland
- Died: After 1324
- Other names: Alice Kettle; Alice Keteller
- Occupation: Moneylender
- Known for: First recorded person charged with witchcraft in Ireland
- Spouse(s): William Outlaw (married c. 1280–1302); Adam le Blund (married c. 1302–1309); Richard de Valle (married c. 1309–1316); John le Poer (married c. 1324)
- Children: At least 1 (William Outlawe)
- Relatives: le Poer family (through marriage); Roger Utlagh (through marriage)

Dame Alice Kyteler (/ˈkɪtlər/; c. 1260 – after 1324) was an Irish moneylender and landowner who became the first person convicted of witchcraft in Ireland. Born to a wealthy merchant family of Flemish descent in County Kilkenny, Kyteler was first accused of sorcery in March 1324.

Among her accusers were her current husband and her stepchildren from her three previous marriages, who believed Kyteler had maliciously deprived them of their inheritances. Some sources therefore suggest that Kyteler may have murdered her first three husbands, which would make her Ireland's first known serial killer. She had faced allegations of killing her first husband earlier, in 1302, though these were likely financially motivated and were soon dismissed.

Kyteler fled Ireland in 1324 before she could be tried in person. She was convicted in absentia, and what became of her afterwards is unknown. Her associate Petronilla de Meath was burned to death in November 1324 after confessing to the heretical crimes that she, Kyteler, and Kyteler's associates allegedly committed.

== Early life ==
Alice Kyteler (sometimes recorded as Kettle or Keteller) was the only child born to a family of Flemish merchants in County Kilkenny, Ireland.

Members of the extended Kyteler family had first moved there in the late thirteenth century. By the time they arrived, Kilkenny already had a sizeable Flemish population. Leinster, the province containing Kilkenny, had been governed by Anglo-Norman statesman William Marshal between 1189 and 1219, during which time he encouraged settlers from Flanders to bring their artisan skills in construction and industry.

Fáilte Ireland sign recognising Kyteler's Inn as a National Monument.

The Kytelers quickly established themselves as merchants and landowners. They gave their name to Kyteler's Inn (originally Kyteler's Hall) in Kilkenny, a property at which Alice may have lived. It is also possible that she was raised in Flemingstown, a gated suburb for Flemish immigrants that Marshal founded on the grounds of Kilkenny Castle.

Some historians have identified Alice's father as Joseph Kyteler (or Jose de Keteller), whose burial slab was found within Kyteler's Inn and provides a death date of 1280. It is known that her father was a banker, and she may have had a brother named William. Likely well-educated and literate, Alice stood to receive a significant inheritance from her father's estate.

== Adult life and marriages ==
=== First marriage ===
Around 1280, Kyteler married William Outlawe (or Utlawe), a moneylender from Kilkenny. He was around twenty years older than Kyteler at the time of their marriage; he was also a known relative of Roger Outlawe. They had a son named William, after his father.

After the death of Kyteler's first husband during or before 1302, she inherited and continued his business, in partnership with her son. Local records provide that many of Kilkenny's nobles and merchants accrued debts to William Outlawe, suggesting their business was successful.

=== Second marriage and accusation of murder ===
Kyteler was married to her second husband, Adam le Blund of Callan, by 1302. According to Thomas Wright, he hailed from another wealthy family that would go on to own considerable estates in Kilkenny and Tipperary. In June 1303, the couple loaned £500 to Edward I, King of England and Lord of Ireland, to fund his war chest during the First War of Scottish Independence.

In 1302, William Outlawe levied accusations of theft at both Kilkenny's seneschal, a crown-appointed administrative official, and Kilkenny's sheriff William le Kiteler, who was likely related to Alice (possibly her brother). Allegedly, the sheriff and the seneschal had learned that Outlawe had buried £3,000 on his estate, which his mother and stepfather had entrusted to him for safekeeping, along with £100 of his own funds. They had dug up the money and tried to claim it as a treasure trove under common law.

In retaliation, the sheriff and seneschal accused Kyteler and Blund of killing Kyteler's first husband. They also accused the couple of harbouring an alleged thief, Rose Outlawe. Also recorded as Roesia, her relationship to Kyteler is unknown, though some scholars infer that she was a daughter from Kyteler's first marriage. Still, historian Bernadette Williams believes this is unlikely, as records of the time typically denoted family relationships if one existed.

The three accused were briefly imprisoned as authorities sought the death penalty. However, Kyteler and Blund enjoyed the support of the noble Poer family, who served as their guarantors for bail, and from King Edward I, who owed them a debt of £500. The king ordered the sheriff and the seneschal to instead answer to the offence of trespass against Kyteler, Blund, and Rose, whose release he ordered. The dispute was seemingly resolved by 1305, because William le Kiteler, William Outlawe, and Adam le Blund were named as defendants that year in a harassment suit. That year also saw William Outlawe become the mayor of Kilkenny.

Between February and April 1307, Blund issued three legal deeds to quitclaim the contents of his estate to his stepson, William Outlawe. The deeds also released William from any debts owed to Blund's estate. Blund's children from a previous marriage were subsequently deprived of their inheritance. Blund died shortly afterwards.

=== Third and fourth marriages ===
By 1309, Kyteler was married to Richard de Valle, a landowner from County Tipperary. Valle granted his stepson William the power to collect debts on behalf of the de Valle family. When he died around 1316, Kyteler sued Richard's son and heir, also named Richard, for a third of his estate, which she was owed as his widow.

Kyteler subsequently married John le Poer. He belonged to the powerful Poer family that had supported her and her second husband, Adam, while they fended off an accusation of murder, serving as a guarantor for the couple. By now, Kyteler had amassed wealth of her own from her family and first three marriages, attracting the envy of some members of Kilkenny society.

Early in their marriage, John grew gravely ill, and Kyteler began making arrangements to pass his estate to her son. By now, Kyteler had attracted the ire of her stepchildren from previous marriages, who felt Kyteler had unfairly deprived them of their inheritances.

== Witchcraft investigation ==
Much of what is known of the case against Kyteler and her associates derives from an account that was most likely penned by the bishop who investigated her, written in Latin in 1324. The document, in its original Latin, reached a broader audience in 1843 when it was published by Thomas Wright of the Camden Society. An English translation for general audiences was first published in 1993.

=== Initial inquisition ===
In early 1324, Kyteler's stepchildren from her previous marriages, alongside her husband John le Poer, brought a complaint of witchcraft to Richard de Ledrede, the Bishop of Ossory.

The case began when John le Poer began to grow emaciated, losing his fingernails and body hair. After a maid warned him that Alice was responsible for his condition, John searched their house and found a sack of mysterious ingredients in a locked room. Ledrede would assess them to be ingredients for potions that Kyteler supposedly used to harm John. Kyteler's accusers also alleged that she had killed her first three husbands through supernatural means. Upon learning of the investigation, Kyteler left her marital home to stay with her son.

Prosecuting Kyteler was politically advantageous for Ledrede, who had few allies in Kilkenny. Being an appointee of the Catholic Church, he had little influence over monarch King Edward II, and his English birth made him unpopular with the native Irish population. He therefore clashed with royal official Arnold le Poer, a long-time ally of Kyteler who was Kilkenny's seneschal and a relative of John le Poer. Ledrede likely saw an opportunity to undermine Arnold le Poer by convicting one of his in-laws.

Ledrede convened an inquisition to investigate Kyteler, which ultimately issued seven charges against her and ten associates. He alleged that the group had ceased to attend mass for a year, having instead turned to demons for guidance. They allegedly sacrificed animals to a demon named Robin Artisson, crafted potions to control or kill their victims, and blasphemed by denying the power of Christ. Kyteler herself was accused of having a sexual relationship with Robin Artisson in return for wealth. Ledrede also claimed that Kyteler had used magic to kill her past husbands, and was planning to repeat history with John le Poer.

=== Indictment of Kyteler and William ===
Ledrede sought permission to arrest Kyteler from Roger Outlawe, Lord Chancellor of Ireland, who was a blood relative of Kyteler's son William. The bishop invoked the decretal Ut Inquisitionis (1298), which directed secular authorities to defer to the church in cases of spiritual offences. To protect his mother, William Outlawe appealed to Arnold le Poer and Roger Outlawe; the latter ordered Ledrede to excommunicate Kyteler for at least 40 days first. Ledrede complied by suspending Kyteler from the church, then issued a summons for her to appear in ecclesiastical court. She instead fled to Dublin to shelter under Roger's protection.

In March 1324, a frustrated Ledrede cited William for heresy and for harbouring a heretic, his mother. Arnold le Poer responded by jailing Ledrede for 17 days, until William's ecclesiastical court date had passed. The arrest of a clergyman caused an outcry that turned public opinion in Ledrede's favour. Kilkenny's parishioners were especially angered by the interdict placed on the diocese while the bishop was in jail. This amounted to a suspension of all religious rites in Kilkenny, meaning that no marriages or baptisms could occur, among other ceremonies.

Upon his release, Ledrede once again issued a summons for William. These proceedings moved slowly until Ledrede received two summonses to Dublin in May. The first summons was for the Lord Official's court in Dublin, which wanted him to explain why he had excommunicated Kyteler without a conviction. The action was brought by Kyteler herself, who did not appear in person but had hired lawyers to pursue Ledrede for defaming her. The second summons was for the Irish House of Lords, as Arnold le Poer accused him of exceeding the bounds of his power.

While representatives made the bishop's case in court, he attended the House of Lords. The session concluded by delegating the matter to a commission of four bishops, reporting to the Dean of St Patrick's. The commission investigated and ultimately ruled in Ledrede's favour after finding that Arnold had misrepresented the circumstances of Ledrede's arrest. The bishop received assurances that he would be allowed to investigate Kyteler and her associates, but Kyteler had, by this time, already fled from Ireland. Arnold le Poer was also compelled to apologise to Ledrede for jailing him.

== Aftermath ==
On 2 July 1324, Kyteler was convicted in absentia, and her belongings were burnt. What became of Kyteler herself is unknown. According to historian Bernadette Williams, she likely fled to England or Flanders. St John Seymour and William Renwick Riddell similarly conclude that she could have only left for England.

Ledrede continued to investigate Kyteler's associates, most of whom were of lower social standings than Kyteler herself. They included Petronilla de Meath, and Petronilla's daughter, Sarah. Although Petronilla is commonly described as Kyteler's maid, there is no evidence of this in contemporary sources. Petronilla's occupation, if any, is unclear. Kyteler is recorded as having fled with Sarah in her care.

The other accused were a cleric of minor orders identified as Robert of Bristol and members of the Galrussyn family (John, Ellen, and Syssok), a man named William Payn de Boly, and three women named Annota Lange, Eva de Brownestown, and Alice, identified only as the wife of a smith named Henry.

=== Prosecutions ===
While all of Kyteler's so-called accomplices confessed to the charges against them, it is unknown what punishment, if any, they received, apart from William and Petronilla. Although executions were performed by civil authorities rather than the Church directly, canon law of the time typically recommended life imprisonment for repentant convicted heretics, which was often commuted to acts of penance. Convicted heretics who did not repent could be submitted for execution.

William was sentenced to a penance of attending mass three times a day for a year, feeding the poor, and paying to cover the roof of St Canice's Cathedral with lead. Petronilla was flogged six times on Ledrede's orders until she confessed, alleging that Kyteler had taught her everything she knew about witchcraft. As she did not repent, she was sentenced to death and publicly burnt alive on 3 November 1324, marking the first example of an execution by fire for heresy in Ireland.

Ledrede's feud with Arnold le Poer and Roger Outlawe continued after Kyteler's disappearance. In late 1328, Ledrede accused both Arnold and Roger of heresy as well. Roger was acquitted in January 1329, but Arnold died in March 1329 while awaiting trial. By this time, Ledrede had alienated both Roger and Alexander de Bicknor, Archbishop of Dublin, the latter of whom was more concerned with holding political power than with zealously enforcing doctrine. Bicknor exiled Ledrede from Ireland shortly afterwards, and the bishop would not be restored to his position until 1347, albeit with reduced powers.

== Significance of Kyteler's case ==
=== Early examples of common claims in witch trials ===
As historian Brian A. Pavlac notes, Kyteler's prosecution was not a direct influence on the witch trials in the early modern period. The broad hysteria around witches that resulted in widespread trials began around 1450, over a century later. Kyteler was, however, accused of activities that would feature in the "cumulative concept of witchcraft," or, popular beliefs about witch activity that eventually came to "cement the stereotype of the witch".

Kyteler's case seemingly marks the first recorded claim of a witch being sexually intimate with an incubus, or a demon from whom the witch derives power. It was also the first known attempt to prosecute alleged witches as an organised group, resembling later hysterias around covens. Furthermore, during Ledrede's inquisition, one witness claimed to have seen Kyteler grease a staff with a mysterious ointment, upon which she "ambled and galloped" through any terrain, as though it were a horse. Historians Vanessa Taylor and Margaret Murray identify this testimony as an early example of a witch's broom in Europe's witch trials.

=== Impact on ecclesiastical practices ===
Prior to the Kyteler case, the Catholic Church viewed witchcraft as a lesser crime than heresy. As historian Lorris Chevalier describes, Catholics considered demons to be mere "tempters or creators of illusions". This began to change after Pope John XXII became head of the Catholic Church in 1316. He strongly believed in sorcery, up to the point of fearing that enemies may use magic to harm or assassinate him.

In 1320, he informally directed senior members of the clergy to inquire into cases of witchcraft through existing processes for investigating heresy. In 1326, two years after Kyteler was investigated, John XXII issued a papal bull, Super illius specula (Upon His Watchtower), that codified acts of sorcery and transacting with demons as heresy. The investigation into Kyteler and her associates, as one of the earliest cases in Europe that tied heresy to witchcraft, provided a template by which ecclesiastical practices could be incorporated into the judicial system.

== Historical analysis ==
=== Serial killer theory ===
Some scholars of Kyteler's case find significance in Ledrede's description of John le Poer as growing emaciated and missing his hair and fingernails. John's presentation could suggest that Kyteler was using thallium or arsenic to poison him, a method she possibly used to dispose of previous husbands after ensuring that their estates went to her son, William.

Academic Maeve Callan takes the view that Kyteler was unlikely to be a serial killer because her "most vehement defenders" were Arnold le Poer and Roger Outlawe, blood relatives of her first and fourth husbands. Callan assesses that they would not have defended Kyteler "again and again" if they believed there was a chance she had murdered their family members.

Likewise, writer Tori Telfer notes that there is no evidence of Kyteler pressuring her husbands to favour William over their biological children. Her second husband may have left his estate to William voluntarily; her third husband could have mutually benefited from appointing William to manage debts owed to him. Still, she notes that Kyteler's first husband died "conveniently" soon after William was old enough to run the family business, and that her second husband died soon after deeding his estate to William.

=== Financial motivations ===
Kyteler may have been targeted due to her wealth, as the era's "patriarchal political system had a vested interest in suppressing the potential power of women." She may have attracted particular resentment from others, including her stepchildren, who did not believe women should be entitled to inherit. Norman Cohn opines that the charges against Kyteler were designed "to show that Lady Alice had no right to her wealth [which] had been wrested from its rightful owners by truly diabolic means".

Nonetheless, academic Maeve Callan points out that Kyteler was unusually wealthy for the time. In the early 1300s, a typical male labourer could expect to earn one Edwardian halfpenny a day. In stark contrast, the £3,000 that Kyteler had entrusted to her son William in 1302 would have been the equivalent of €3.5 million in 2024; this sum represented only a fraction of her wealth. As Cohn highlights, many Kilkenny locals also owed money to William Outlawe, and may have seen the family's downfall as a means of resolving their debts. Conversely, Roger Outlawe, the royal official who defended Kyteler, owed money to Richard Ledrede, and may have been motivated to undermine the bishop on that basis.

=== Ledrede's motivations ===
Academic Maeve Callan assesses Bishop Ledrede as someone who "based many of his accusations of heresy on opposition to him and his office". His zealous prosecution of Kyteler and her associates was therefore likely a response to the resistance he found from Ireland's civil officials, as he sought to assert the ultimate authority of the Church. Furthermore, Ledrede, who built a "lavish palace" for himself and made expensive purchases, stood to benefit from pursuing the wealthy Kyteler, as he enjoyed an ecclesiastical right to seize the property of convicted heretics.

Nonetheless, Callan concedes that Ledrede was appointed by Pope John XXII, who strongly believed in, and feared, witches. Ledrede was subsequently motivated to conduct "a self-imposed (albeit papal-influenced) crusade to root out heresy." Jeffrey Burton Russell similarly finds that, while Ledrede "may have been too susceptible to finding a heretic in anyone who opposed him," his accusations were "lurid" for the era. Russell therefore suggests that Kyteler may have attracted Ledrede's attention for genuinely "dabbling in" what resembled "sorcery and other eccentric practices", perhaps inspired by Irish folklore.

== In art and popular culture ==
=== Poetry and literature ===
"Nineteen Hundred and Nineteen"

...But now wind drops, dust settles; thereupon
There lurches past, his great eyes without thought
Under the shadow of stupid straw-pale locks,
That insolent fiend Robert Artisson
To whom the love-lorn Lady Kyteler brought
Bronzed peacock feathers, red combs of her cocks...

— W. B. Yeats

Alice Kyteler and her alleged demon familiar feature in W. B. Yeats' poem "Nineteen Hundred and Nineteen". Composed between 1919 and 1921, the poem was published in Yeats' 1928 collection The Tower. Kyteler's case also features in The Name of the Rose, a 1980 novel by Umberto Eco, in a conversation between William of Baskerville and an abbot.

Novels that feature a fictionalised Kyteler include The Burning Time (2006) by Robin Morgan, Her Kind (2023) by Niamh Boyce, and Bright I Burn (2024) by Molly Aitken. The Stone, published by Claire Nolan in 2008, was adapted into a musical of the same name that premiered in Kilkenny in 2011. In her short story "Looking for Petronilla" (2002), Emma Donoghue imagines an immortal Kyteler revisiting Kilkenny in the modern day.

Sculpture of Alice Kyteler and Petronilla de Meath by Kevin Fennelly, installed in 2014 in Kells.

=== Art and popular culture ===
The 1979 feminist art piece by Judy Chicago, The Dinner Party, features a place setting for Petronilla de Meath. The plate features the image of a book, a candle, a bell, and a cauldron. All of these items are encapsulated by fire.

In 2014, the village of Kells received a public art installation by sculptor Kevin T. Fennelly, depicting Kyteler and Meath in limestone. The scene depicts Kyteler seated upon a bench, waiting for Petronilla, depicted as a maid, to finish preparing dinner.

To commemorate 700 years since the investigation into Kyteler and the execution of Meath, Kilkenny County Council held a series of events including historical exhibitions and tours. The council also commissioned the Alice Project, which became a series of immersive public performances that interpreted Kyteler's life at five locations in Kilkenny. The performances ran in August 2026 as part of that year's Kilkenny Arts Festival.

=== Film and television ===
Kyteler's story features in the 2022 TG4 documentary series, An Diabhal Inti ("The Devil's in Her"), which explores significant historic witch trials.

== See also ==
- Kyteler's Inn – a pub in Kilkenny which markets itself using Kyteler's name
- List of fugitives from justice who disappeared
- List of serial killers before 1900
