= St Canice's Cathedral =

Church of Ireland cathedral in County Kilkenny, Ireland

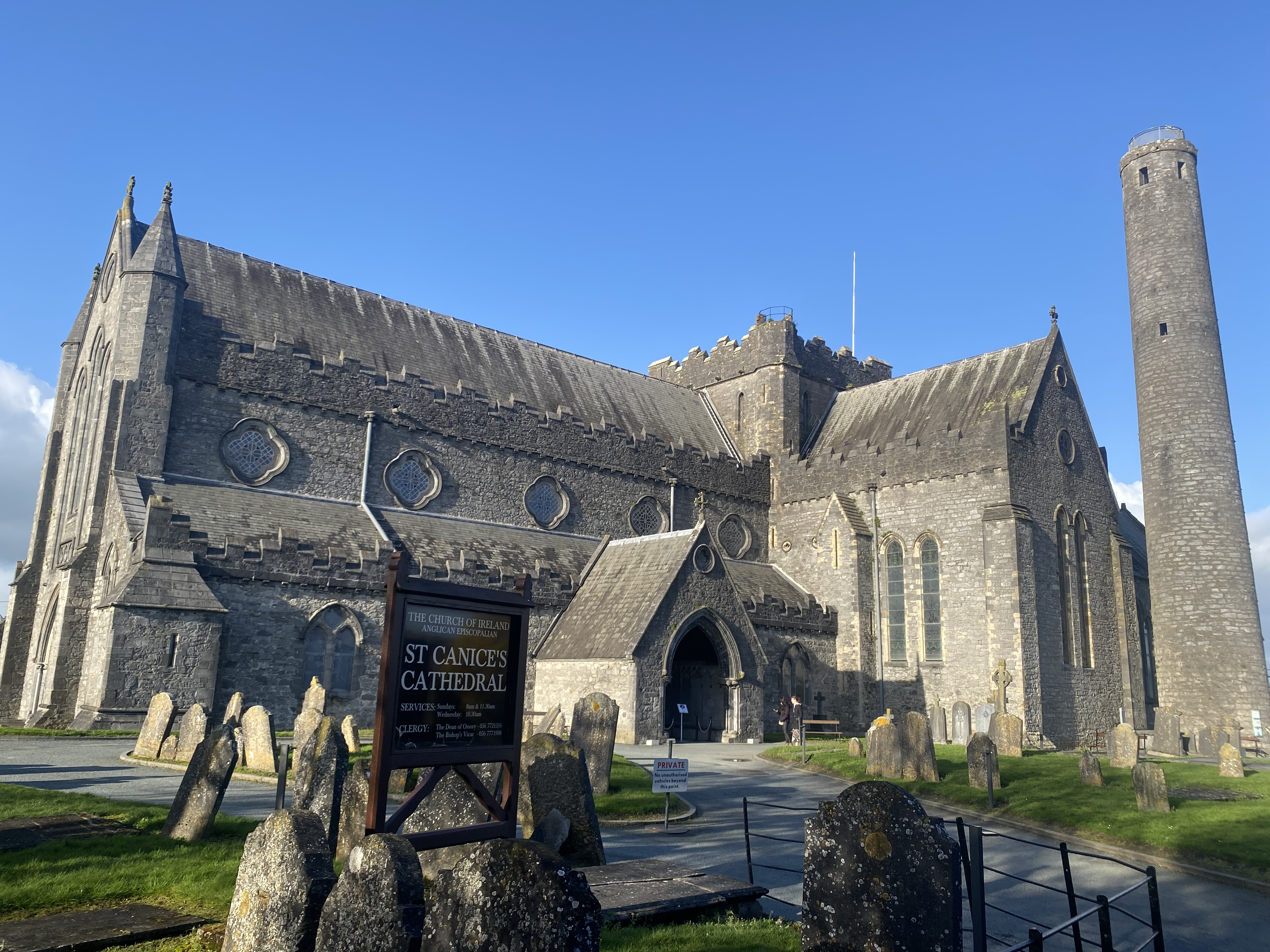
- St Canice's Cathedral
- 52°39′24.40″N 07°15′25.72″W
- Location: County Kilkenny
- Country: Ireland
- Denomination: Church of Ireland
- Previous denomination: Roman Catholic
- Website: https://www.stcanicescathedral.ie/

History
- Dedication: St. Canice

Architecture
- Style: Gothic
- Years built: 13 century (between 1202 and 1285)

Administration
- Province: Dublin
- Diocese: Cashel and Ossory
- Archdeaconry: Ossory and Leighlin

Clergy
- Bishop: The Right Reverend Adrian Wilkinson
- Vicar: Rev William Burke
- Dean: The Very Rev'd Stephen A. Farrell

St Canice's Cathedral (Irish: Ardeaglais Naomh Cainneach, pronounced [ˈaːɾˠd̪ˠˌaɡlˠəʃ n̪ˠiːw ˈkan̠ʲəx]), also known as Kilkenny Cathedral, is a Church of Ireland cathedral in Kilkenny city, Ireland. It is in the ecclesiastical province of Dublin. Previously the cathedral of the Diocese of Ossory, it is now one of six cathedrals in the United Dioceses of Cashel and Ossory.

== History ==
The present building dates from the 13th century and is the second longest cathedral in Ireland, after St Patrick's Cathedral, Dublin. Beside the cathedral stands a 100 ft (30 m) 12th-century round tower. St Canice's tower is an example of a well-preserved 12th-century "Celtic Christian" round tower. It is dedicated to St Canice. It is one of only three such medieval round towers in Ireland that can still be climbed to the top, the other two being Kildare Round Tower in Kildare Town and Devenish Round Tower in County Fermanagh.

The cathedral stands on the site of a Celtic Christian monastery said to have been founded in the sixth century by St Canice as a daughter house of Aghaboe Abbey. The Synod of Rathbreasail in 1111, which first divided Ireland into territorial dioceses, included both Aghaboe and Kilkenny in the Diocese of Ossory, with the episcopal see at Kilkenny, the capital of the Kingdom of Ossory. Thus the abbey church became the cathedral. The erroneous belief that the see was originally at Aghaboe and later transferred to Kilkenny is traced by John Bradley to a 16th-century misinterpretation of a 13th-century property transfer.

The cathedral contains some 16th-century monuments. The architectural style of the cathedral is Early Gothic and is built of limestone. It is richly endowed with many stained glass windows, including the east window which is a replica of the original 13th-century window. The cathedral contains some of the finest 16th-century monuments in Ireland.

== Ancient history ==
Kilkenny was the ancient capital of the Kingdom of Ossory and St Canice's Cathedral stands on a site which has experienced Christian worship since the 6th century. The name of "Kilkenny" itself retains the anglicised version of the Irish Cill Chainnigh, which translates as "Church of Cainneach", or "Canice".

The earliest church on the site is presumed to have been made of wood, later to be replaced in the later medieval period by a Romanesque-style stone church. This was in turn replaced by the current imposing medieval cathedral. A few yards from the present south transept stands an imposing 9th-century round tower, 100 ft high.

Accessible only by a steep set of internal ladders, it may once have been both a watchtower and a refuge. The summit gives a clear view of Kilkenny and the countryside around it. The hill on which the cathedral stands is believed to be the centre of the first major settlement at Kilkenny, and the round tower suggests an early ecclesiastical foundation.

Much less is known about the early secular structures, but the area around the cathedral, called Irishtown, is the oldest part of the present city.

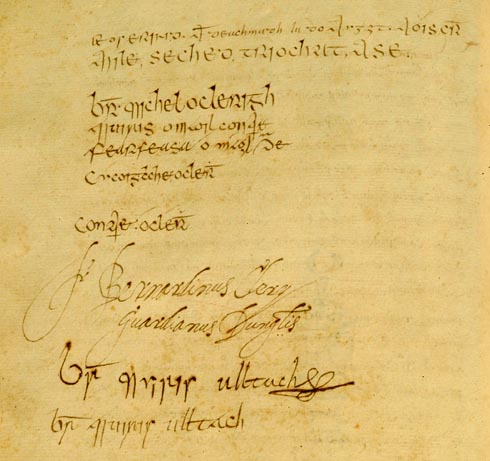
Signatures of the Four Masters

There is no mention of Kilkenny in the lives of Cainnech of Aghaboe, Ciarán of Saighir or any of the early annals of Ireland suggesting that in those times it was not of great importance. The Annals of the Four Masters recorded entries for Cill Chainnigh in 1085 ("Ceall-Cainnigh was for the most part burned") and again in 1114 ("... Cill-Cainnigh ... were all burned this year").

The present building was begun in the 13th century, when it was at the western end of Kilkenny, and shows some similarities to St Patrick's Cathedral, Dublin, both dating from the same period and completed by the end of the 13th century.

In the Red Book of Ossory, fifteen pages dating from about 1324 contain sixty Latin verses, or Cantilenae, written by Richard de Ledrede, Bishop of Ossory, best known for his connection with trials for heresy and witchcraft. As stated elsewhere in the Red Book, Ledred wrote these verses "for the Vicars Choral of Kilkenny Cathedral, his priests and clerics, to be sung on great festivals and other occasions, that their throats and mouths, sanctified to God, might not be polluted with theatrical, indecent, and secular songs".

The cathedral was "restored" between 1844 and 1867 without the removal of any important medieval features.

== Description ==
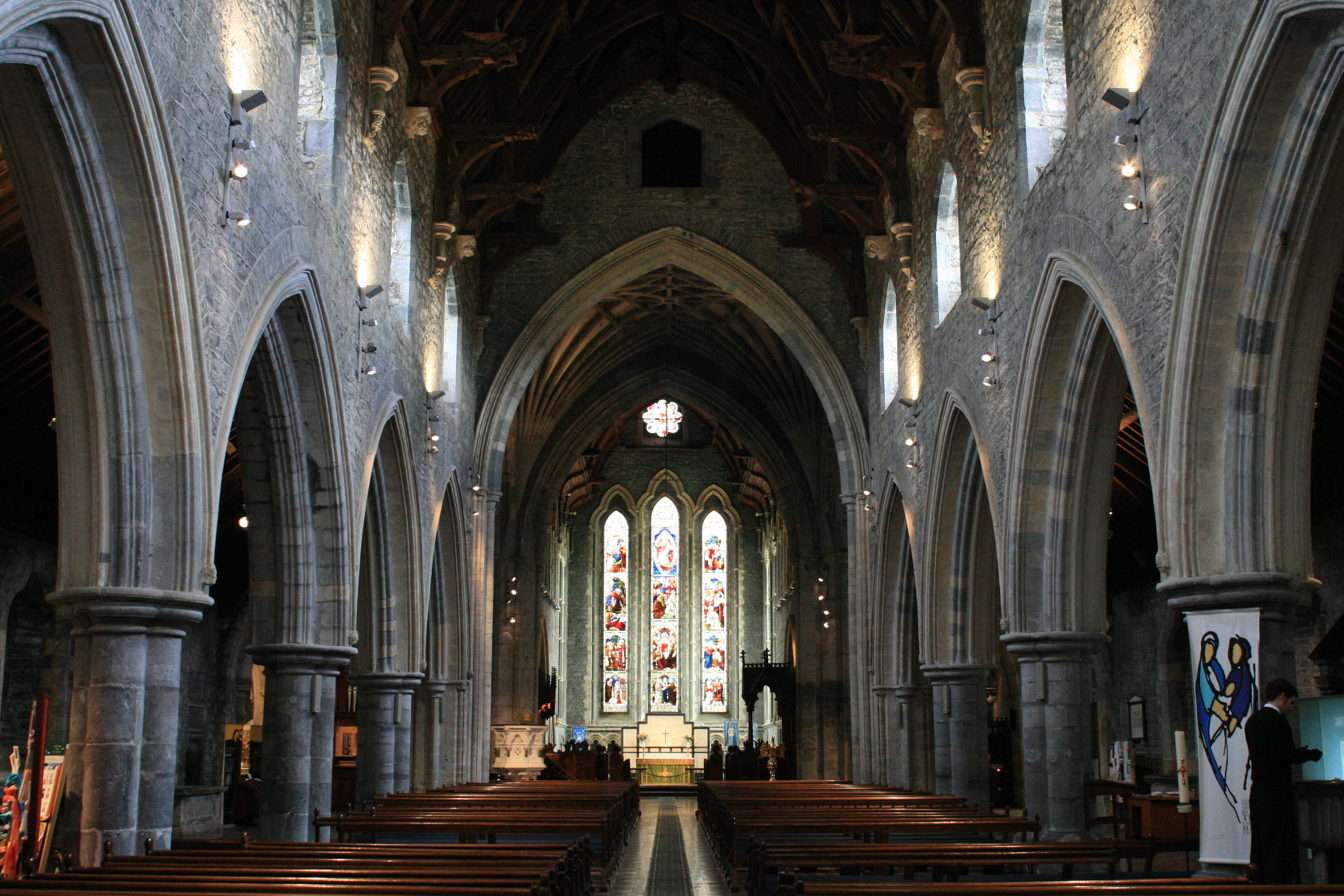
Interior of the church

Modern bust of St Canice, from Kilkenny Cathedral

Cruciform, the cathedral was built in the Early English, or English Gothic, style of architecture, of limestone, with a low central tower supported on black marble columns. The exterior walls, apart from the gables, are embattled, and there are two small spires at the west end. The cathedral is seventy-five yards long, and its width along the transepts is forty-one yards.

Inside, high pointed arches form entrances from the nave into the choir and the two transepts, mostly from the 14th century. Between the nave and each aisle is a row of five black marble clustered columns, with high moulded arches. The nave is lighted by a large west window and five clerestory windows, while the aisles each have four windows. The choir has a groined ceiling with fine tracery and a central group of cherubs.

The baptismal font is medieval and the ancient stone of enthronement for bishops still exists under the seat of the medieval throne in the north transept, where to this day the bishops of Ossory are enthroned.

The cathedral contains some of the finest ancient monuments in Ireland, including one to Bishop David, and the tombs of many bishops of Ossory and several owners of Kilkenny Castle. The subjects of the memorials stretch widely across the social spectrum, from the great figures of the House of Ormonde to the humble shoemaker and carpenter. In the north transept is the ancient Chair of St Kieran, made of carved stone, still used as the chair of enthronement for the Church of Ireland Bishops of Cashel and Ossory.

There are continental carvings on the choir stalls and the hammer-beam roof. The cathedral has many stained glass windows, including the fine east window, which is a replica of the 13th-century original.

On the eastern side of the south transept is the consistory court, built by Bishop Pococke, with the chapter house to the north of it. From the north transept, a dark passage leads into St Mary's chapel, where the services of St Canice's parish once took place, and a later parish church next to it holds the tomb of Bishop Gafney (died 1576). Despite some 19th-century restoration, the cathedral has been carefully preserved in its original style and form. Near the cathedral's east end is Bishop's Palace.

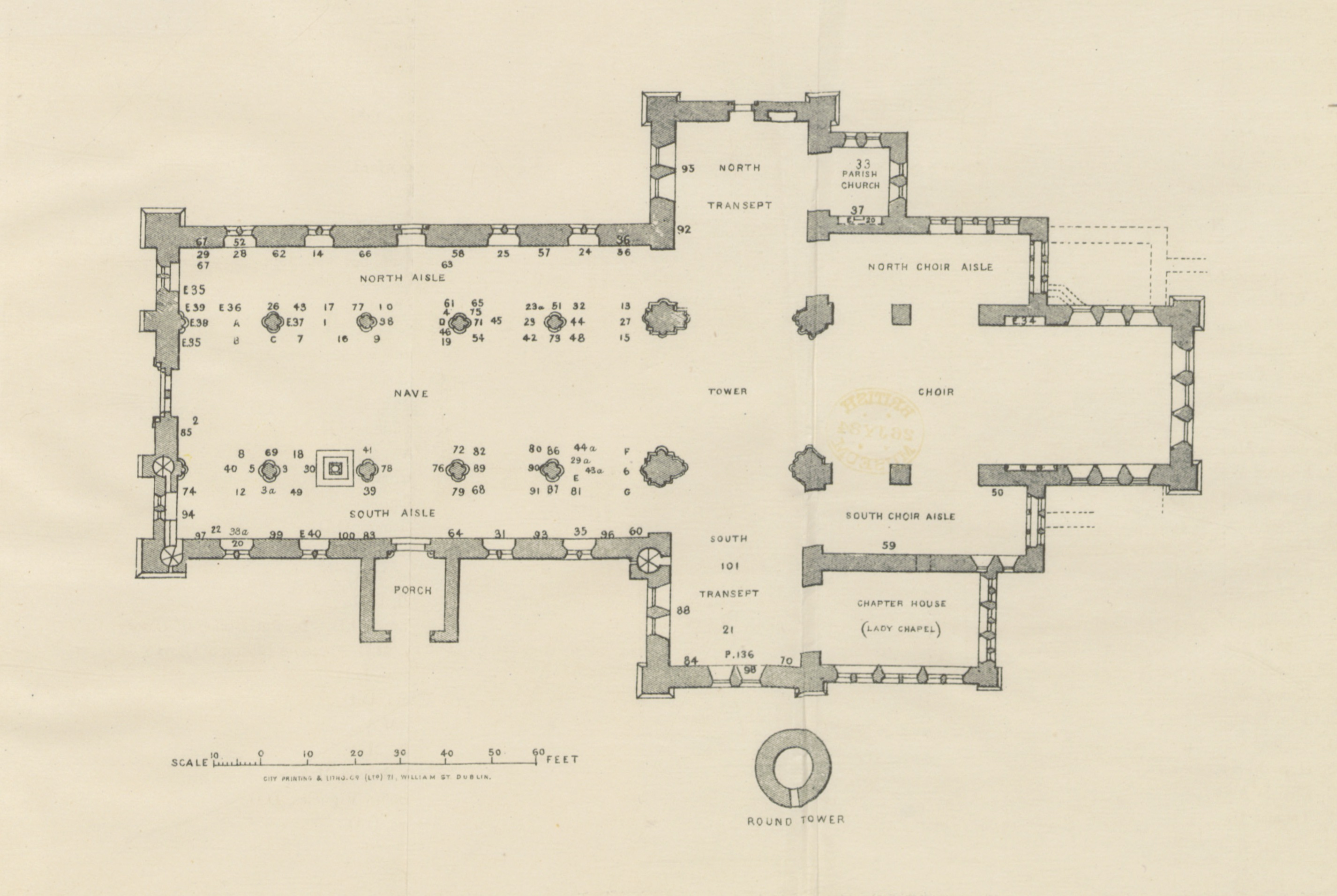
Image taken from page 47 of 'Handbook to the Cathedral Church of St. Canice, Kilkenny. Edited by R. L'

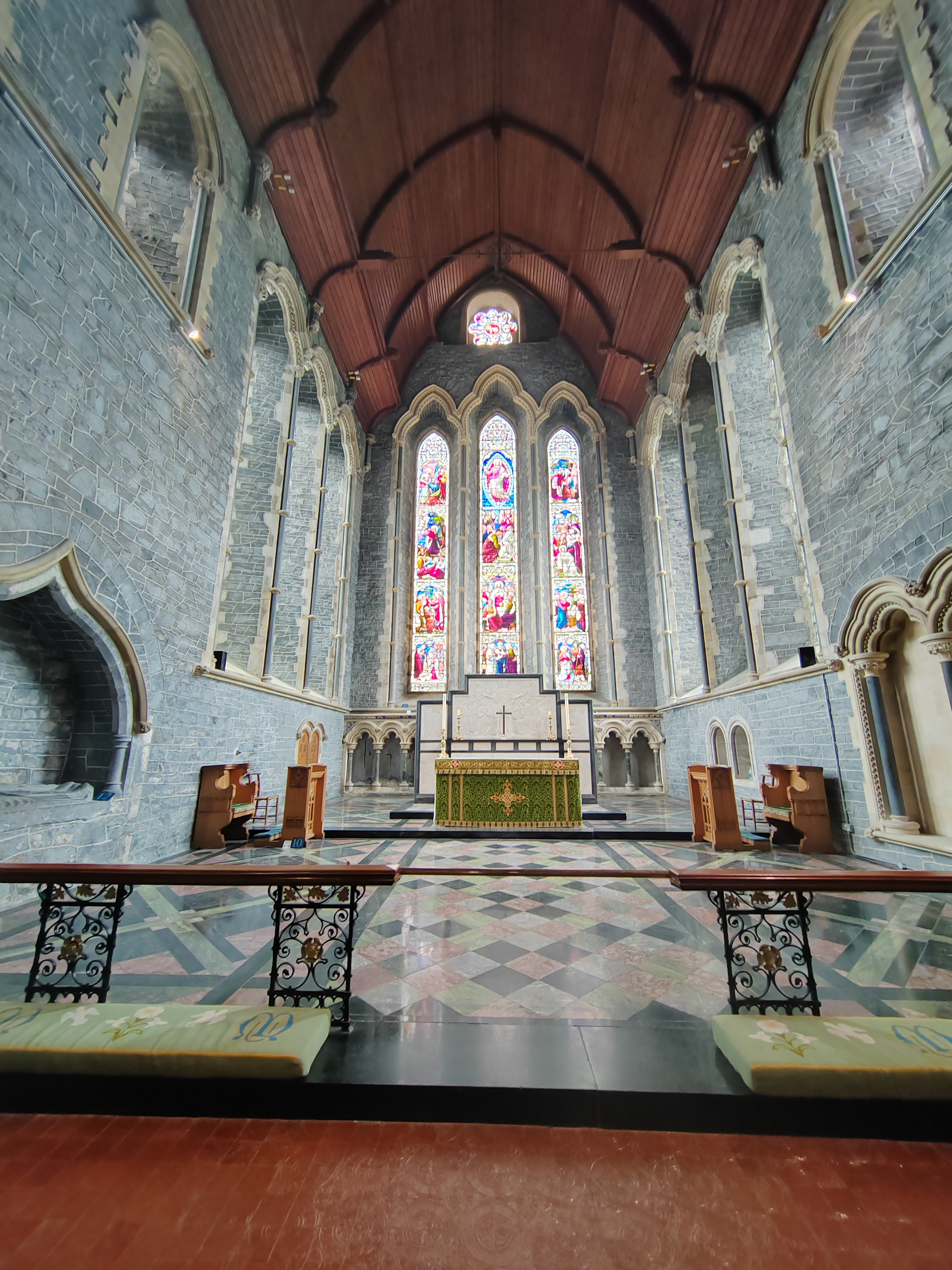
Canice's Cathedral Altar

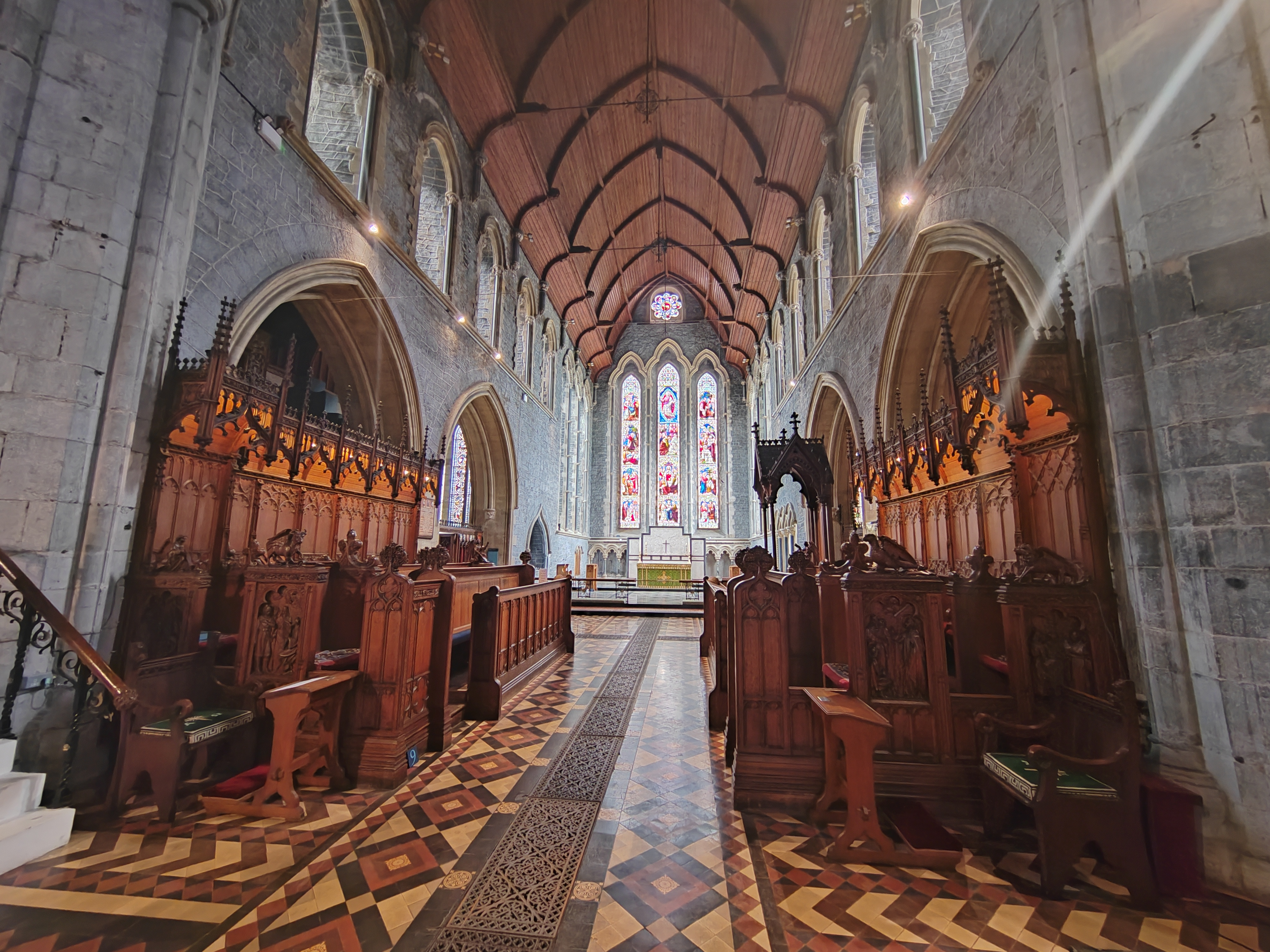
Canice's Cathedral Towards Altar

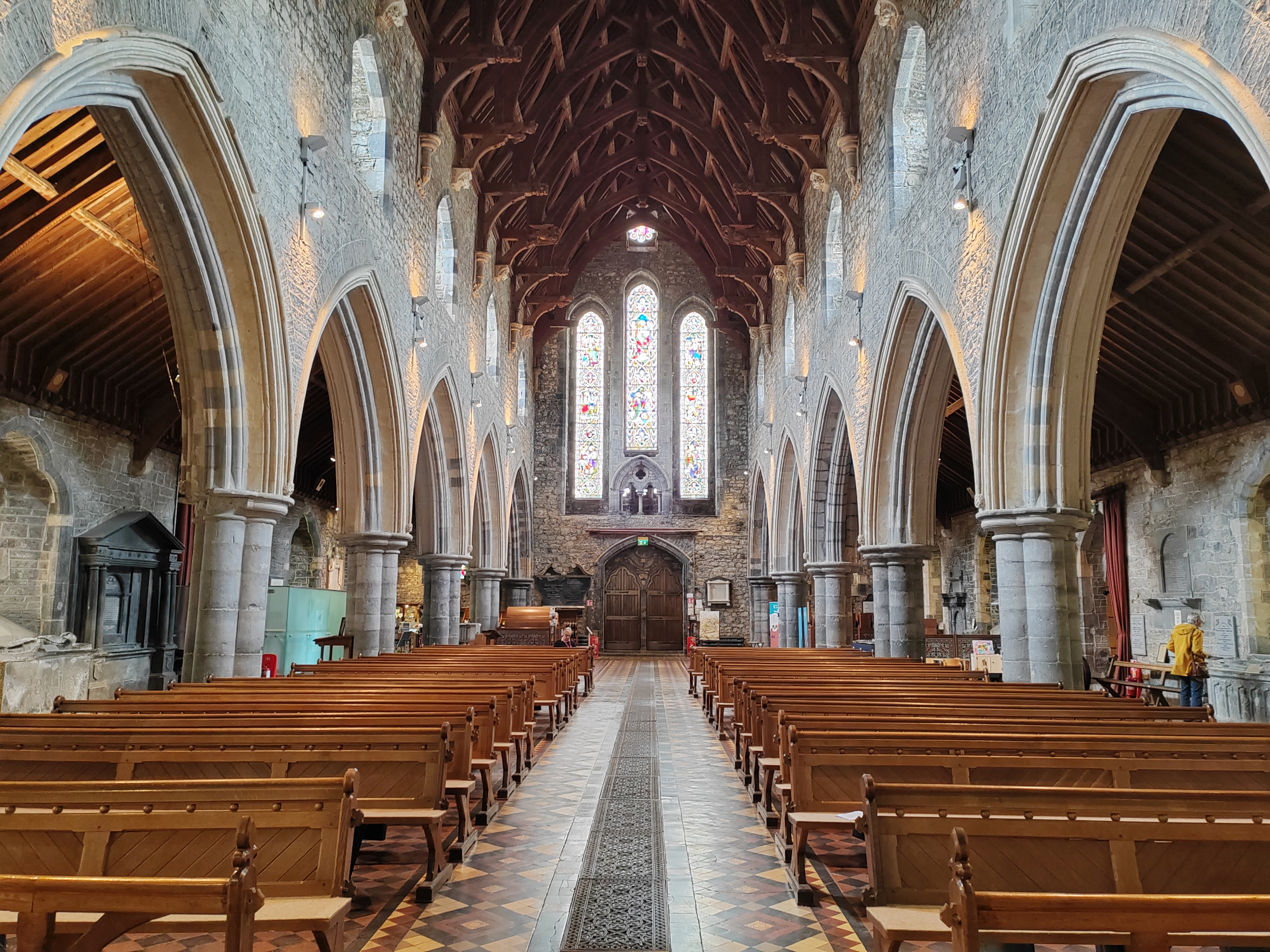
Canice's Cathedral Away from Altar

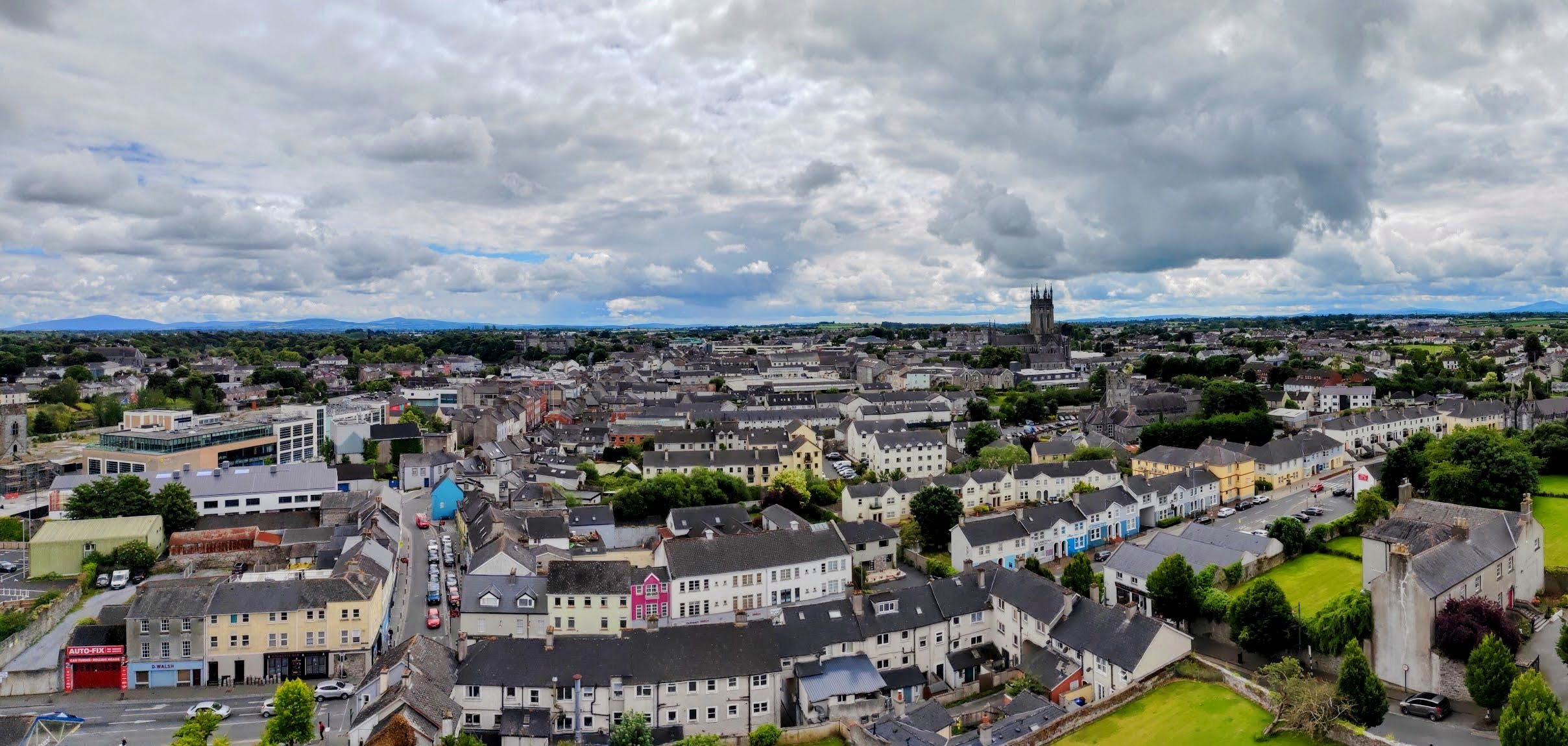
View of Kilkenny from top of round tower

Canices Cathedral Choir Practice 2022

== St. Canice's Library ==
It was established in 1693 by Bishop Thomas Otway, it contains many theological documents and artefacts particularly relating to Bishop Otway and Bishop Edward Maurice from the 17th and 18th centuries. In 2013 the Maurice Otway collection was loaned to Maynooth College for restoration and safekeeping; earlier some documents have been moved to the Church of Ireland Representative Body house in Dublin.

== Burials and memorials ==
- William de Karlell (died 1383), Chief Baron of the Irish Exchequer, and his brother John (died 1393), Chancellor of St Patrick's Cathedral, Dublin
- The 2nd Earl of Ormond (1331–1382)
- The 8th Earl of Ormond (c.1467–1539)
- The 10th Earl of Ormond (1531–1614)
- The 11th Earl of Ormond (1559–1632/3)
- David Rothe (1573–1650), Roman Catholic Bishop of Ossory – a cenotaph to his memory, though his remains were interred in St. Mary's Church
- Griffith Williams (1589?–1672), Bishop of Ossory
- Hugh Hamilton (1729–1805), Bishop of Ossory
- Denis Pack (1772–1823), Major-General in the British Army

== See also ==
- List of abbeys and priories in County Kilkenny.
- Bishop of Cashel and Ossory
- Dean of Kilkenny
