= Petronilla de Meath =

Irish woman burnt for heresy

Petronilla de Midia (of Meath) (c. 1300 – 1324) was an alleged follower of Dame Alice Kyteler, a wealthy woman of Flemish ancestry who lived in the Lordship of Ireland in what is now County Kilkenny. After the death of Kyteler's fourth husband, Kyteler was accused of practicing witchcraft and Petronilla was charged with being one of her accomplices. Petronilla was tortured and forced to proclaim that she and Kyteler were guilty of witchcraft. Kyteler fled to save her life, and Petronilla was then flogged and eventually burnt at the stake on 3 November 1324 in Kilkenny. Hers was the first known case in Ireland or British Isles of death by fire for the crime of heresy.

== Confession and execution ==
Seven charges were brought against Alice Kyteler and her associates, including Petronilla, by the Bishop of Ossory, Richard de Ledrede:

... that they were denying Christ and the church; that they cut up living animals and scattered the pieces at cross roads as offerings to a demon called the son of Art in return for his help; that they stole the keys of the church and held meetings there at night; that in the skull of a robber they placed the intestines and internal organs of cocks, worms, nails cut from dead bodies, hairs from the buttocks and clothes of boys who died before being baptized; that, from this brew they made potions to incite people to love, hate, kill and afflict Christians; that Alice herself had a certain demon as incubus by whom she permitted herself to be known carnally and that he appeared to her either as a cat, a shaggy black dog or as a black man aethiopos, from whom she received her wealth; and that Alice had used her sorcery to murder some of her husbands and to infatuate others, with the result that they gave all of their possessions to her and her son.

The charges ranged from committing sorcery and demonism to having murdered several husbands, and Kyteler was accused of having acquired her wealth illegally through witchcraft. These accusations came principally from the children of her late husbands by their previous marriages. The trial predated any formal witchcraft statute in Ireland; thus relying on ecclesiastical law where witchcraft was treated as heresy, instead of English common law, where it was generally viewed as a petty criminal offence. While Kyteler fled to Flanders or England to escape the trial, the other accused were not as fortunate, particularly Petronilla. Ledrede ordered the torture of Petronilla and the other less wealthy associates imprisoned in Kilkenny, who were examined using the inquisitional procedure allowed by the papal decree Super illius specula. They confessed to the charges made against them. According to A Contemporary Narrative of the Proceedings Against Dame Alice Kyteler: Prosecuted for Sorcery in 1324 written by Ledrede, Petronilla confessed to all manner of things:

... Amongst other things she said that she with her said mistress often made a sentence of excommunication against her own husband with wax candles lighted and repeated expectoration, as their rules required. And though she was indeed herself an adept in this accursed art of theirs, she said she was nothing in comparison with her mistress, from whom she had learned all these things and many more; and indeed in all the realm of the King of England there was none more skilled or equal to her in this art ...

Petronilla claimed that Kyteler allowed a demon to know her carnally, that she consulted devils and made potions and that Kyteler denied the "faith of Christ and the Church". Petronilla also held that she and her mistress applied a magical potion to a wooden beam, which enabled both women to fly. Petronilla was then forced to make a public proclamation that Kyteler and her followers were guilty of witchcraft. Petronilla was whipped six times (according to Ledrede "flogged through six parishes"), in accordance with Ledrede's orders, and condemned to be burnt at the stake as a heretic. John Clyn, the Kilkenny Franciscan chronicler, recorded her death: "Petronilla de Midia ... was condemned for sorcery, lot taking and offering sacrifices to demons, consigned to the flames and burned. Moreover before her even in olden days it was neither seen nor heard of that anyone suffered the death penalty for heresy in Ireland."

She was the mother of another accused accomplice, named Sarah, who evidently escaped with Alice. Drawing on John Pembridge's 14th-century annals which change Sarah's name to Basilia, in Sir James Ware's History of the Bishops of the Kingdom of Ireland and of Such Matters Ecclesiastical and Civil, he makes reference to Basil being an accused associate who managed to escape with Kyteler, "The Lady and Basil fled".

== Legacy ==
Feminist artist Judy Chicago set a place for Petronilla at her installation piece of 39 mythical and historical women entitled The Dinner Party. Since 2007, the piece has been on permanent exhibition at the Elizabeth A. Sackler Center for Feminist Art at the Brooklyn Museum in New York.

Her Kind, is a novel by award-winning Irish novelist Niamh Boyce, first published by Penguin in 2019. Researched and written in Kilkenny, Ireland – it tells the story of the Kyteler witchcraft trial through the voice of Petronilla. A magical thriller, it was nominated for the EU Prize for Literature and praised for shining a light on women who have been silenced.
