= William Houghton (bishop) =

English Dominican, diplomat and Archbishop of Dublin

William Houghton (date and place of birth unknown; died at Dijon, 1298) was an English Dominican who became a diplomat and Archbishop of Dublin.

== Life ==
It is not known in which convent in England he received the habit of St. Dominic—it is certain that he made his higher studies in the Convent of St. James in Paris—there he took his degrees and lectured with great success. In the general chapter of the order held in Vienna in 1282, he was chosen Provincial of England. His contemporaries all speak of a uniform sweetness and a singular charm and distinction of manner which won for him at once love and respect. He governed the English province for five years, when he was recalled to Paris to resume his public lectures on theology.

His ability was recognized by the court of France, especially by the king, Philip IV. But the English Dominicans wished him to return home, and they elected him provincial, which office he filled for a term of seven years. He became a favourite of King Edward I, and received many marks of royal affection and esteem.

Edward I sent Houghton to Rome as ambassador to propose to the Pope his royal desire to assist the pope in affording help to the Christians in the Holy Land. The king proposed the conditions of the Holy Siege and he did this through his minister, William Houghton, who was favourably received at Rome and obtained nearly all that he desired. He returned to England with a Brief from Pope Nicholas IV, dated Rome, 10 Nov. 1289.

The See of Dublin had become vacant by the death of Archbishop John de Sandford. Thomas de Chaddesworth, Dean of St Patrick's Cathedral Dublin, the successor named by the chapter, was not acceptable to the king, despite a long and impressive record of service to the Crown, so the see remained vacant from Oct. 1294 to June 1297. Edward I appealed to Pope Boniface VIII requesting the appointment of William Houghton. This wish was granted and Houghton was consecrated at Ghent by Anthony Beck, Bishop of Durham, in 1297.

A war was raging between France and England and the two monarchs, Philip IV of France and Edward I of England, were brought by the mediation of Houghton to conclude a treaty of peace for two years. In 1298, Edward I sent Houghton to Boniface VIII as a legate to acquaint the pope with the conclusion of the treaty of peace. Having been received by the sovereign pontiff (20 June 1298) Houghton set out for England but on the way fell sick at Dijon (France) and died there on 28 August 1298. By command of Edward I the remains were brought to London and laid in the Church of the Friars Preachers.

== Works ==
He found time to write the following works: "Commentarii in Sententiarum Libros", "De immediata visione Dei tractatus", "De unitate formarum Tractatus", "Lecturæ Scholasticæ", and a speech in French on the rights of the English king.

Catholic Church titles
Preceded by (archbishop-elect) Thomas de Chaddesworth (consecrated) John de Sandford	Archbishop of Dublin; 1296–1298	Succeeded by Richard de Ferings
