= Thomas de Chaddesworth =

English-born Crown servant

Thomas de Chaddesworth, de Chedworth or de Chadsworth (c. 1230-1311) was an English-born Crown servant and cleric who spent some fifty years in Ireland, and died there at a great age.

He was Dean of St Patrick's Cathedral, Dublin from 1284 until his death in 1311, having previously been the Cathedral Chancellor from 1266 to 1284. He was the first known Chancellor of the Irish Exchequer (appointed in 1270), and a judge of the Irish Court of Common Pleas. He failed twice to become Archbishop of Dublin, but was compensated with the office of Vicar-General to the Archbishop.

== Life ==
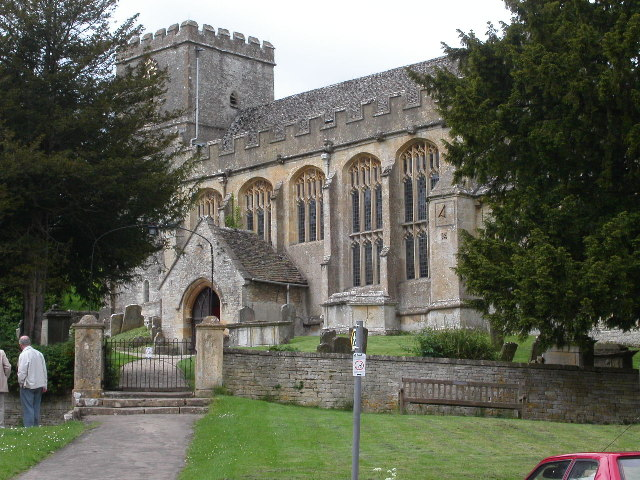
Church of Saint Andrew, Chedworth, Gloucestershire; Thomas was a native of Chedworth

He was a native of Chedworth in Gloucestershire. The various spellings of his name are versions of Chedworth, although in his early years in Ireland, he was usually called Thomas de Theddesden. In a deed of 1284 he refers to his parents and his brother Nicholas, to whom he was evidently close.

He is first heard of in Ireland in 1262, as a clerk to Fulk Basset, Archbishop of Dublin: he evidently returned to England for a time, then travelled back to Ireland with his household and goods in 1265. He had the title "magister", i.e Master? which indicates that he had a University degree. He became Chancellor of St Patrick's Cathedral in 1266. He almost certainly compiled the cartulary "Crede mihi", the oldest surviving register of title deeds in the possession of the Archdiocese of Dublin. He was a diligent Crown servant who enjoyed the personal regard of King Edward I, and was suitably rewarded: he was appointed Chancellor of the Exchequer of Ireland in 1270, (he was apparently the first holder of that office), and was a member of the Privy Council of Ireland. He became a prebendary in the Diocese of Kildare in 1276.

In 1284, shortly after he became Dean of St Patrick's, he claimed that he had been put to great expense and exposed to personal danger when travelling to London at the request of the late Archbishop, John de Derlington, (apparently, this was the first stage of an aborted mission to Rome) and in consequence, he brought a lawsuit against William de Meones, the Archbishop's executor (later Chief Baron of the Irish Exchequer), claiming sixty pounds in compensation.

== Judge ==
He was a High Court judge, who sat on the Court of Common Pleas, (Thomas de Snyterby and John de Ponz were his colleagues), and served as acting Chief Justice of the Irish Common Pleas for a short time after the retirement on grounds of age and infirmity of Robert Bagod, the first full-time Chief Justice, in 1298. He also acted periodically as an itinerant justice. He visited England from time to time to report on Irish affairs, and during the Conquest of Wales he was in personal attendance on the King for much of the years 1282–4.

In 1291 he was appointed one of the collectors in Ireland of the tax on movable goods of one-tenth their value, which was earmarked for a new crusade (the "crusading tenth") and which had been agreed on as long ago as 1274.

He presided as inquisitor at what was said to be Ireland's first heresy trial, of Philip de Braybrooke, a canon of Christ Church Cathedral, in 1310. It is questionable how active a role he played at the trial since he was in failing mental and physical health in his last years (after fifty years in the Crown's service he was clearly a very old man), and much of his work was deputised to his successor as Dean, William de Rodyard, and to Alexander de Bicknor, the future Archbishop. This course had the full approval of Archbishop de Ferings, who had himself suggested to Chaddesworth that he might wish to appoint a deputy. An order survives from 1302-3 to pay his 20 marks as payment of his half-years salary as a judge.

== Failure to become Archbishop of Dublin ==
On two occasions, in 1295 and 1299, he was elected Archbishop of Dublin by the Cathedral Chapter of St. Patrick's. However, on neither occasion was he able to obtain papal confirmation for his election, and he was never consecrated as Archbishop.

His failure on the first occasion was due to his non-appearance in Rome within the required period, which gave grave offence to the Pope. His failure on the second occasion was due to the existence of a rival candidate put forward by the chapter of Christ Church Cathedral, Dublin, namely their Prior, Adam of Belsham. The Pope, Boniface VIII, was annoyed at being asked to choose between them, and ordered both candidates to stand down in favour of Richard de Ferings, the Archdeacon of Canterbury. Due to the need for haste neither Thomas nor Adam had obtained a royal licence for their election, which was bound to offend so formidable a ruler as Edward, even though Thomas has been a valued servant to both Edward and his father, King Henry III of England. Edward accordingly did not actively support Thomas' candidature, and he made no objection to de Ferings' election. Both Thomas and Adam, lacking powerful supporters, and after being threatened with proceedings for contempt of court, withdrew their candidatures.

== Vicar-General ==
On his return to Dublin, he was compensated with the additional office of Vicar-General to the Archbishop, despite concerns about his age and failing health. He regularly deputised for the Archbishop during the latter's absences abroad. The stern visitation he carried out at Christ Church Cathedral, involving the expulsion of his former rival Prior Adam, suggests that he was still smarting from his humiliation at failing to become Archbishop. On the whole, however, he made a sincere effort to heal the bitter and longstanding breach between the two chapters, with the full support of Archbishop Ferings, a mild and conciliatory man. In a crucial concession, the Christ Church chapter was given the final say in the choice of Archbishop, and this became a permanent arrangement. Thomas retired from the Bench in 1303, presumably on grounds of age.

== Death ==
He died late in 1311, after years of failing health. Since he had been in Ireland for some fifty years, and was described as being of "a great age" by 1300, he must have been well into his eighties when he died. He had been expected to take a leading role in the Irish proceedings against the Knight Templars, but died before the trial was underway.

Church of Ireland titles
Preceded by John de Sandford	Dean of St Patrick's Cathedral, Dublin; 1284–1311	Succeeded by William de Rodyard
