= Fromund Le Brun =

Fromund le Brun (died 1283) was a cleric and judge in thirteenth-century Ireland who became Lord Chancellor of Ireland. He lost a long battle to become Archbishop of Dublin, due largely to his notorious pluralism (i.e. his holding of multiple benefices). He also clashed bitterly with the formidable Archbishop of Cashel, David Mac Cerbaill, who excommunicated him.

== Early career ==
He came from an Anglo-Irish settler family. He may have been a descendant of Sir William le Brun, who came to Ireland during the Norman invasion of Ireland. He was probably related to another William le Brun (fl.1230-1251), who was a senior royal clerk and had a varied career, including service as Keeper of Guildford Castle and guardian of the future King Edward I. William was appointed a Baron of the Court of Exchequer (Ireland) in about 1251.

Fromund is said to have been illegitimate. He is first heard of in 1248 as a clerk to the Justiciar of Ireland, Sir John Fitzgeoffrey (in office 1245–55), and apparently gained considerable judicial experience in this way: Fitzgeoffrey was a strong and capable viceroy, who reorganised the government of Ulster, and Le Brun must have learnt a good deal from him.

His duties included performing numerous administrative tasks: his first recorded assignment was to deliver treasure to the King's Wardrobe (this was a Department of the Royal Household, not simply a room) at Marlborough. He was appointed Lord Chancellor in 1259 and held the office with (possibly) one intermission until his death in 1283. He was a noted pluralist: he was appointed Archdeacon of Waterford, while he also held livings in the dioceses of Dublin, Winchester and Salisbury. He became a papal chaplain in 1259.

== Failure to become Archbishop of Dublin ==
He was the choice of the monks of Christ Church Cathedral, Dublin (then called Holy Trinity Priory), to be Archbishop of Dublin in 1271, on the death of Fulk Basset, but he was opposed by another papal chaplain and proctor, William de la Corner, Archdeacon of Glendalough, who was the choice of the Chapter of St Patrick's Cathedral, Dublin. The matter dragged on for several years, and was in due course referred to the Pope himself. Le Brun's record of pluralism destroyed his chances of becoming Archbishop when it was found that he was unlawfully in possession of one of his benefices. Pope Nicholas III declared his election void, but also passed over William in favour of a compromise candidate, John de Derlington, who as a royal confessor also enjoyed the confidence of the English Crown (in the event Derlington, detained by official business in England, died the year after Fromund without ever setting foot in Ireland). William de la Corner subsequently became Bishop of Salisbury.

== Quarrel with the Archbishop of Cashel ==
In 1275 Le Brun, like the rest of the Dublin administration, became involved in a bitter quarrel with the formidable Archbishop of Cashel, David Mac Cerbaill (or MacCarwell). The actual issues - the building of a prison in Cashel and a dispute over who should have charge of it - seems trivial enough to modern eyes. However the Archbishop, then as throughout his career, showed himself to be an ambitious, quarrelsome and power-hungry man, who in his 35 years as Archbishop of Cashel clashed with almost every other leading Irish figure. He took grave offence at the suggestion that he should not have exclusive possession of the prison, arguing that Crown control of it was prejudicial to his rights, and fuelled the controversy by excommunicating his opponents. The outraged Le Brun wrote to Robert Burnell, the Lord Chancellor of England, complaining of the Archbishop's conduct in the strongest terms. The matter dragged on for several years, and the Archbishop was successful in obtaining control of the prison, but in 1282 Le Brun was found to be blameless, and in recompense, the English Crown ordered that he receive either a prebend or some other benefice. He died a few months later. He was active as Lord Chancellor till very near the end of his life, travelling to Clonmel and Kilmallock to hear the pleas.

== Roebuck Castle and the Le Brun family ==
Fromund bought Roebuck Castle, in the south of County Dublin, in 1261. It is likely that the purchase was a bad bargain since he was rumoured to be heavily in debt shortly before his death. Roebuck passed to Nigel le Brun, who seems to have been Fromund's nephew. Nigel was granted the right of free warren- i.e. the right to kill rabbits, hares and game birds - on the lands of Roebuck. Nigel and his wife Amicia also acquired Knocktopher Castle in County Kilkenny. Nigel was still living in 1309. Sir Fromund le Brun, Nigel's son, sold his interest in Knocktopher to Edmund Butler, Earl of Carrick, in 1314. He received a royal pardon in 1346 for all acts of outlawry committed by him, in consideration of his good services to the Crown. The Le Brun family remained at Roebuck until the late fifteenth century when it passed by marriage to Robert Barnewall, 1st Baron Trimlestown, who married Elizabeth, daughter of Christopher le Brun, the last male representative of the family. It is now part of the campus of University College Dublin.

Fromund also held lands at Tankardstown in County Meath, which he later granted to Theobald Butler. In 1264 the Lord Edward granted him the castle of Newcastle Lyons for 10 years, although in 1270 it was regranted to the Bishop of Killaloe.

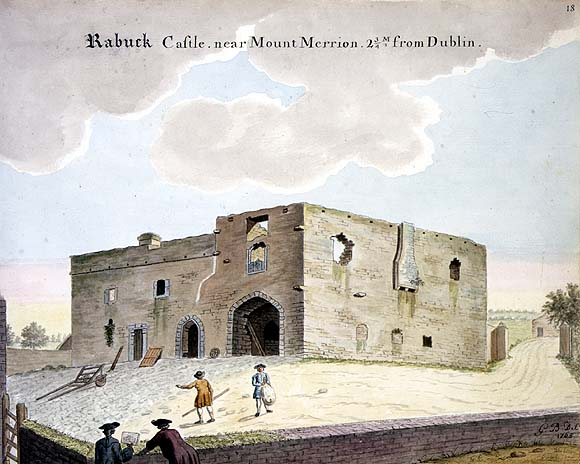
Ruins of Roebuck Castle, by Gabriel Beranger, 1765

He was succeeded as Lord Chancellor by Walter de Fulburn.
