= Richard de Ferings =

Archbishop of Dublin

Richard de Ferings (died 1306), was a British cleric whose served as Archdeacon of Canterbury and later Archbishop of Dublin.

De Ferrings worked at the archdiocese of Canterbury, where he came to the attention of the Archbishop of Canterbury, John Peckham. He was transferred to the diocese of Winchester then back to Canterbury In 1281, he was made Archdeacon of Canterbury and, in 1284, rector of Tunstall. In 1299, De Ferrings was appointed Archbishop of Dublin by Pope Boniface VIII, although spent little time in the diocese. However, during his term, the great valuation of Irish churches was carried out. He was Archbishop of Dublin until his death in 1306.

== Career ==
Ferings was an official of the archdiocese of Canterbury, in which capacity he won the friendship of Archbishop John Peckham. In 1279 he was present at the Council of Reading. In 1280 he was also for a short time an official of the diocese of Winchester, having been appointed by Peckham during a vacancy of the bishopric; but before long Peckham found him so indispensable that he brought him back to Canterbury, and put Adam of Hales into the post at Winchester. Next year Peckham made him Archdeacon of Canterbury, and in 1284 gave him the rectory of Tunstall, near Sittingbourne, Kent, to be held in commendam with the archdeaconry.

Ferings remained archdeacon until 1299, when he was appointed by Pope Boniface VIII to the archbishopric of Dublin. The feuds of the two rival chapters of Christ Church Cathedral and St Patrick's Cathedral had long made the elections to that see constant subjects of disputes. In 1297 William of Hothum, himself a nominee of the pope after a contested election, died soon after his consecration. Early in 1298 the canons of Christ Church Cathedral, Dublin elected their Prior, Adam of Belsham, and St. Patrick's Cathedral, Dublin chose their Dean, Thomas de Chaddesworth, for whom the canons had previously tried to secure the archbishopric in 1295. In their hurry, neither body had secured the royal licence to elect. Both were accordingly summoned to answer for contempt of court, and the temporalities of Christ Church were for a time seized by King Edward I. Ferings's appointment by the pope was consequently not opposed by the king. His consecration was probably abroad, as it is not noticed by the English authorities, though the date is given as 1299 in the 'Annals of Ireland' published with the 'Chartulary of St. Mary's Abbey, Dublin'.

It was not, however, until June 1300 that Ferings received from the crown the temporalities of his see, after renunciation of all the words in the bull of appointment which were prejudicial to the royal authority.

Ferings spent little of his time in Ireland. His conciliatory temper led him to several attempts to make peace with disappointed candidates and angry chapters. Even before his consecration, he had appointed his old rival, Thomas de Chaddesworth, his Vicar General, though he subsequently feared lest the infirmities of age made him unfit for the post (he had been in the service of the Crown since about 1260, and was probably by now well over seventy), and urged the canons of St. Patrick's and Chaddesworth himself to recommend a fit substitute if he were incapable of acting. In 1300 he succeeded in persuading the canons of St. Patrick's and the monks of Christ Church to agree to a 'final and full concord,’ which, while recognising that both churches were of metropolitical and cathedral rank, gave Christ Church, as the elder foundation, a certain honorary precedence. The arrangement became permanent. (The composition is printed in Mason's 'St. Patrick's,’ App. vi.) It was perhaps to conciliate the wounded pride of St. Patrick's that he continued to make Chaddesworth his vicar-general during his frequent absences abroad.

In 1303 he also endowed St. Patrick's with the new prebends of Stagonil and Tipperkevin, the latter of which supported two prebendaries, and in 1304 he exempted the prebendal churches from the visitations of Dean and Archdeacon (Mason, St. Patrick's, App. iii. sec. vi.). In the same year, he also confirmed the arrangements of his predecessors in reference to St. Patrick's (Hist. MSS. Comm. 10th Rep. pt. v. p. 217).

== Later life and death ==
In 1302, he resigned to Edmund Butler the manor of Hollywood, near Dublin, which had for some time been in the possession of the see. In 1303 Ferings was summoned to the English parliament in his capacity of archbishop of Dublin. There are other precedents for this somewhat unusual course. His absence from Ireland was so far recognised by the king that he gave Ferings special permission to have the revenues of his see sent to England for his support, and in letters of protection granted to him Edward speaks of his being in England 'by the king's order'. During his archbishopric the great valuation of the Irish churches was gradually taken. He died on 17 October 1306.

== Sources ==
This article incorporates text from a publication now in the public domain: "Ferings, Richard de". Dictionary of National Biography. London: Smith, Elder & Co. 1885–1900.

Catholic Church titles
| Preceded by William Houghton | Archbishop of Dublin; 1299–1306 | Succeeded by Richard de Havering |
