= David Mac Cerbaill =

Irish archbishop (died 1289)

David Mac Cerbaill (also called MacCarwill or MacCarwell), O.Cist (died 1289), was Archbishop of Cashel from 1254 until his death.

He was by all accounts a quarrelsome, arrogant and assertive man, who clashed with most of the leading Irish political figures of his time. He is best remembered for his unsuccessful efforts to replace the native Irish system of Brehon law with the English common law, by means of the purchase by the Irish authorities, for a considerable sum of money, of the common law system from the English Crown. It has been argued that this attempt shows him, despite his personal ambition and desire for power, to have been a sincere legal reformer.

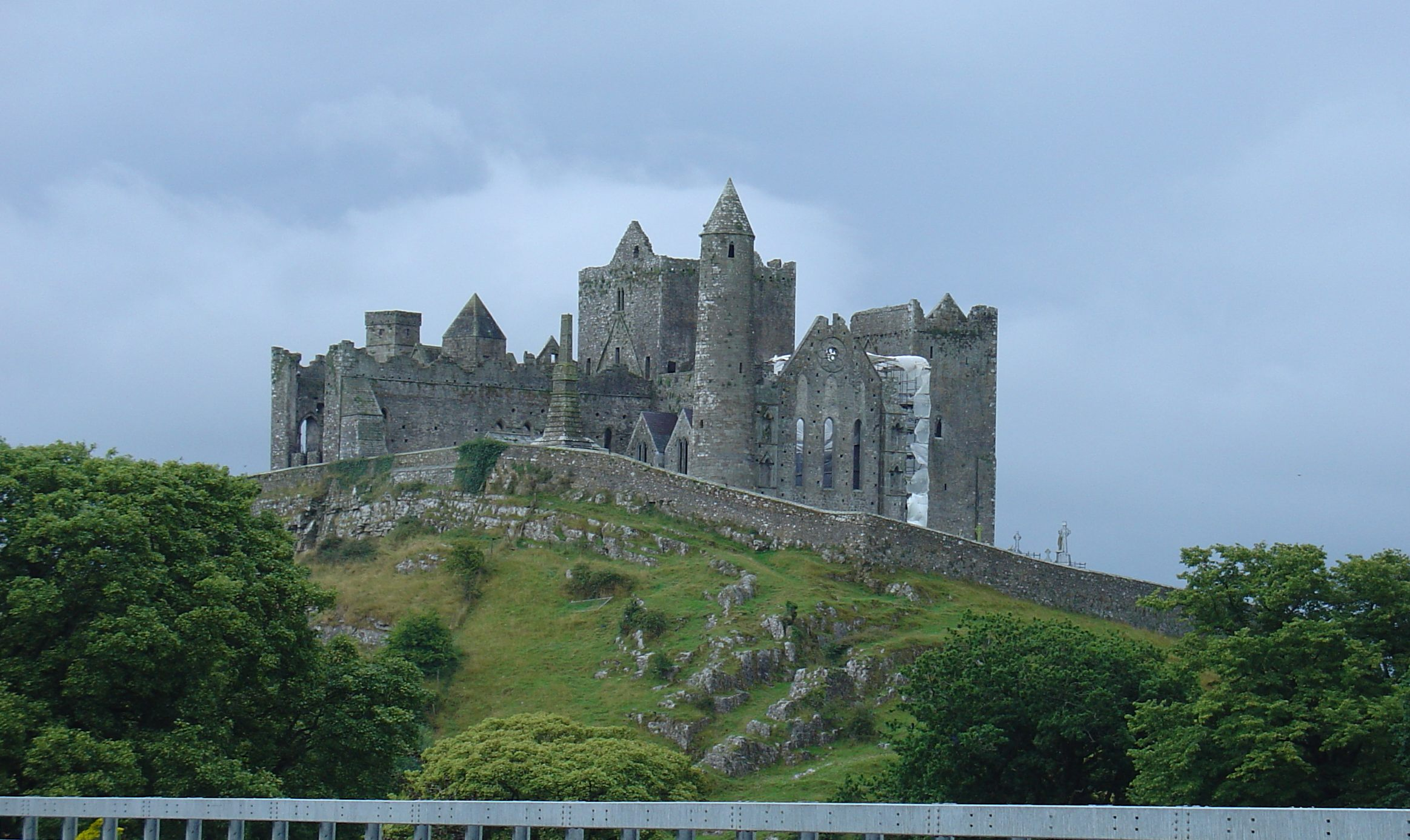
Rock of Cashel

== Career ==
He belonged to a leading Gaelic family from County Tipperary, who had a strong ecclesiastical connection. His family, according to his statement, founded Jerpoint Abbey in the later twelfth century. Little is known of his parents or his early life, but he was Dean of Cashel at the time of his elevation to the episcopal see in August 1254. King Henry III opposed his appointment, on the ground that he was known to be friendly with "the King's enemies", some of whom were MacCerbaill's relatives, but this objection was overruled by Pope Innocent IV. To secure his favour with the English Crown, Mac Cerbaill went to England in 1255 and did homage to the King at Winchester, the first of his many visits to the Royal Court, but despite his repeated assurances of loyalty to the Crown, it does not seem that Henry or his son Edward I ever fully trusted him. Apart from the question of where his real loyalties lay, MacCerbaill had a practice of consecrating bishops without asking for the King's consent, which naturally irritated the monarch.

He joined the Cistercian Order in 1269, and while he imposed strict discipline on the Cistercian monks within his Archdiocese, he also did much to restore the fortunes of their Order, which had fallen into decay in Ireland in recent decades. He re-founded Hore Abbey near Cashel as a Cistercian house in 1270, with the approval of his superiors, who also acceded to his request, made in General Chapter, that all the Irish houses, popularly known as "the daughters of Mellifont" (Mellifont Abbey being the Irish mother house) should in the future be free from English control.

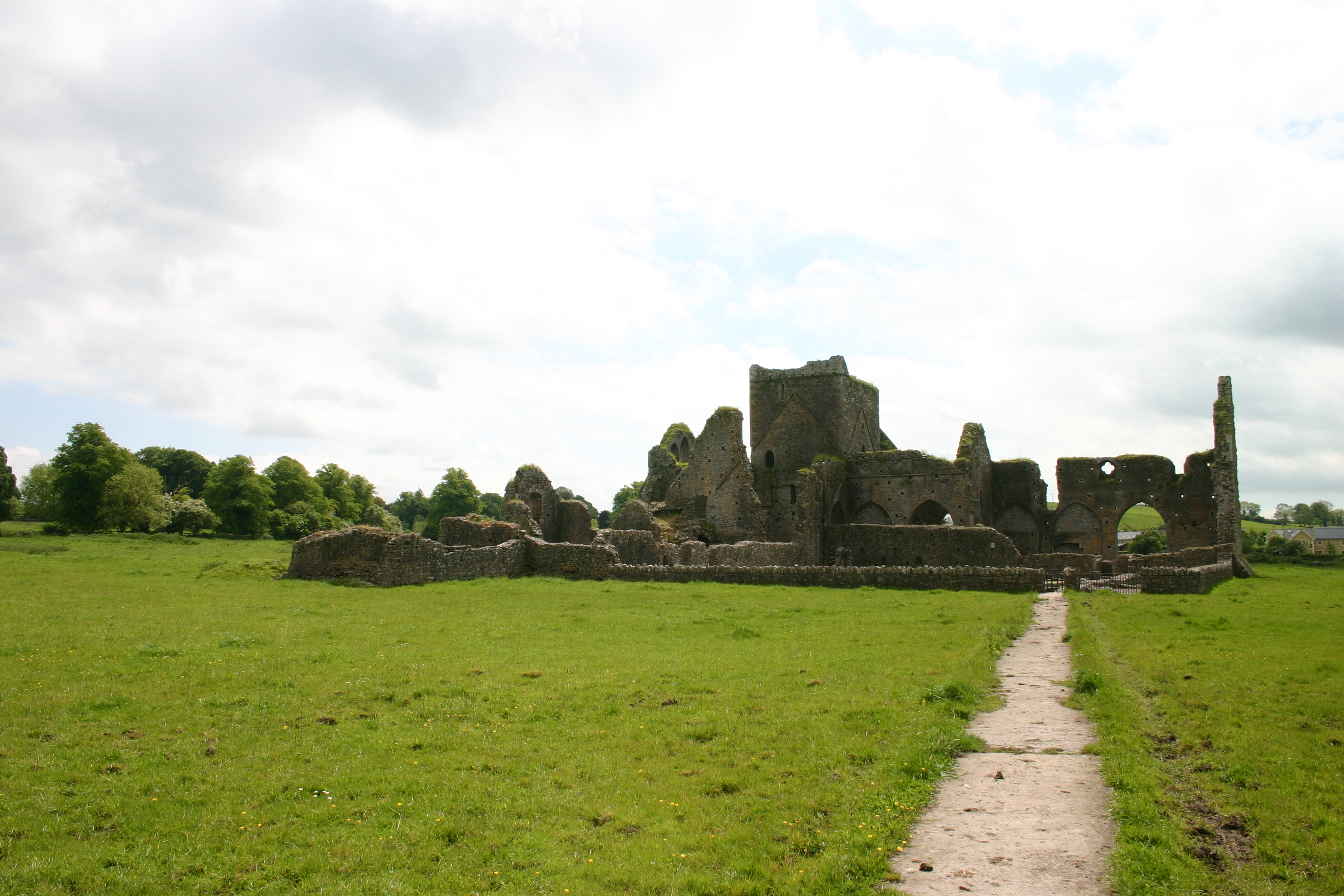
Hore Abbey, near Cashel, which MacCerbaill re-founded as a Cistercian house, and where he is buried

His support for the Cistercians was matched by his hostility to the Benedictine Order. According to a colourful story, his dislike of the Benedictines sprang from a dream he had in which they tried to murder him. In fact, it is simply evidence of his turbulent nature: he also quarrelled in the 1260s with his successor as Dean of Cashel, Keran (or Kyran), who accused him of cruelly ill-treating the clergy of the Archdiocese, and of despoiling the deanery. Keran was so harassed that he appealed to the protection of the Pope, who commended him to the care of King Edward of England.

Later the Archbishop clashed with the entire Dublin administration, whom he excommunicated in 1275 in a trivial dispute over whether the Crown authorities or the Archbishop should have the governance of the new jail in Cashel. After outraged protests from his opponents, in particular from Fromund Le Brun, the Lord Chancellor of Ireland, a compromise was reached in 1277 by which the Archbishop was given control of the jail, but his opponents were judged to be blameless. His conduct on this occasion seems to justify the description of him as "ambitious and power-hungry". He attended the final session of the Second Council of Lyon in 1274.

== Attempt to introduce the common law system in Ireland ==
It may have been an effort to bring about a reconciliation between himself and King Edward which led Mac Cerbaill to propose that the common law be imported into Ireland in return for the payment of a substantial sum of money to the King. The archbishop first proposed this when he met Edward in France in 1274, and negotiations dragged on into the early 1280s, during which time the archbishop lived mostly in England. Critics have called him "ambitious and power-hungry", but it has been suggested in his defence that he had a genuine desire to abolish what he described as "the evil Irish law", which arguably contained much that was objectionable to the Church, especially as regards the law of marriage, and to replace it with a system which was more closely aligned with Church teaching.

A price of 7000 marks was agreed for the introduction of the new legal system (a mark was reckoned as two-thirds of a pound sterling), later raised to 10000 marks, which has been rightly described as "a huge sum in terms of the resources of Ireland". The project ultimately came to nothing. The Dublin administration was utterly indifferent to the proposal, and there were obvious difficulties with collecting so vast a sum, despite the Archbishop's best efforts, given the chronic shortage of money in Ireland.

The King himself may have had doubts about the feasibility of the project, particularly, as his biographer suggests, if the price was whittled down to the point where it meant that the Irish would get the benefits of the common law for free. The project ultimately came to nothing.

== Death ==
Mac Cerbaill, arrogant and quarrelsome to the last, was engaged in a dispute with his fellow bishops when he died in late July or early August 1289. He was buried in Hore Abbey, the ruins of which still exist.

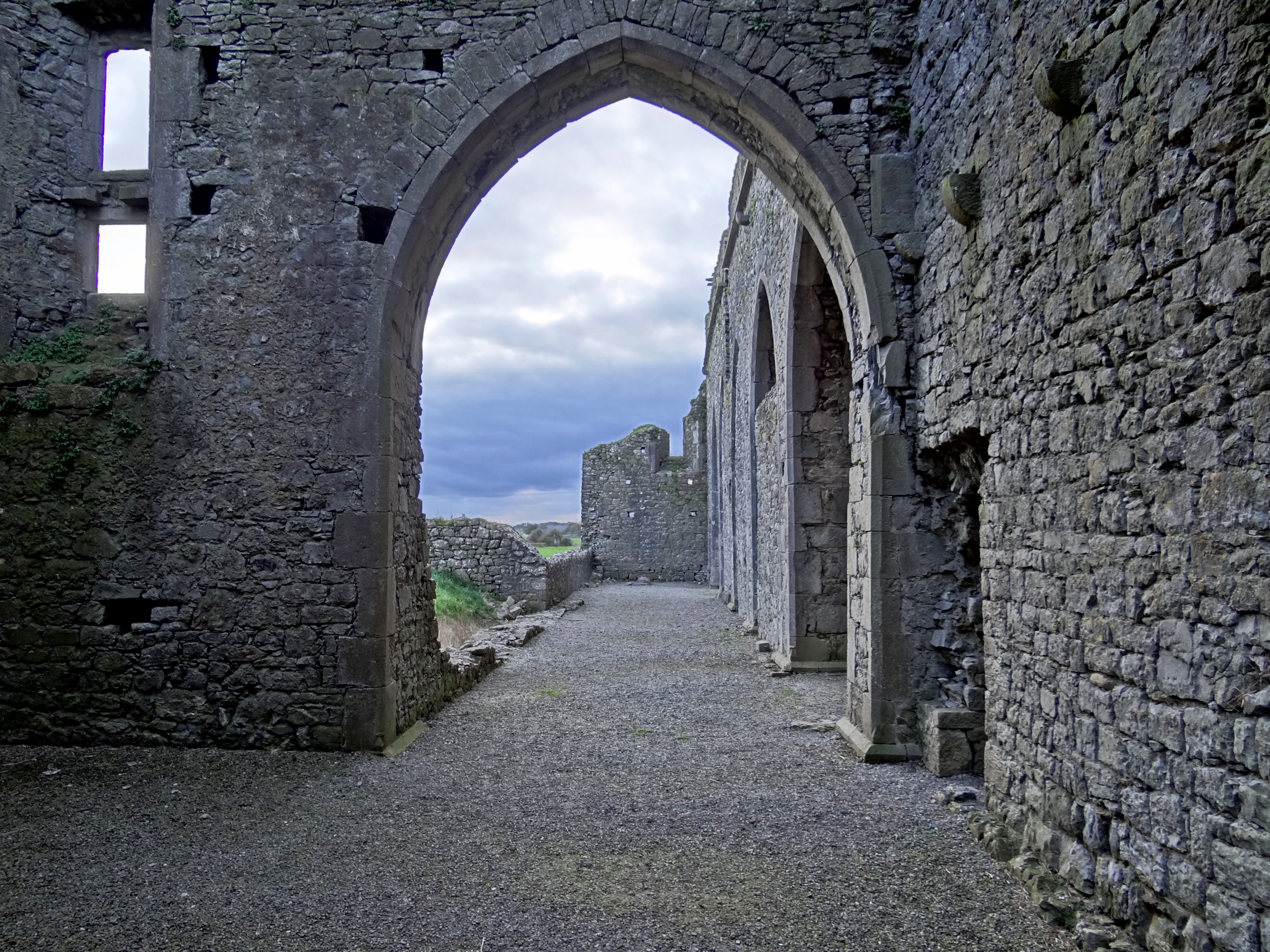
Hore Abbey, archway

== Sources ==
- Breen, Aiden "MacCerbaill (MacCarwell), David" Cambridge Dictionary of Irish Biography
- Cotton, Henry (1851) Fasti Ecclesiae Hibernicae: The Succession of the Prelates and Members of the Cathedral Bodies of Ireland Volume 1 (2nd edition). Dublin: Hodges and Smith
- Otway-Ruthven, A.J. A History of Medieval Ireland Barnes and Noble reissue New York 1993
- Prestwich, Michael Edward I University of California Press 1988
