= William le Brun =

Irish-born servant of the English Crown

William le Brun (fl. 1230–1251) was an Irish-born servant of the English Crown.

He was descended from early Anglo-Norman settlers in Ireland. An earlier Sir William le Brun, probably his ancestor, had come over with the Anglo-Norman invasion of Ireland. Fromund Le Brun, Lord Chancellor of Ireland 1270–1283, was his cousin. He first visited England in 1230. He was in holy orders and held a number of livings, including Montgomery and Dungarvan, and had custody of the See of Durham in 1240. He had the title "Master", which then indicated that he held a University degree.

He was in the service of the prime royal favourite Peter des Rivaux, who held office briefly as Lord High Treasurer in the early 1230s. He acted as his Deputy as Sheriff of Surrey and was keeper of Guildford Castle. Rivaux fell from power in 1234: thereafter William entered the Crown's service, and held a position in the Exchequer.

In 1242 he was appointed guardian of the infant Lord Edward, later King Edward I, a position he held until 1245. He was in Ireland on official business in 1241, surveying the lands of Connacht and surveying the state of Ireland. He spent much of the latter part of the decade in England. He was back in Ireland acting as a Baron of the Court of Exchequer (Ireland) in 1251, one of the first references to the Court. Little is known of his subsequent career. His date of death is not recorded.

== Sources ==
- Ball, F. Elrington The Judges in Ireland 1221-1921 London John Murray 1926
- Prestwich, Michael Edward I University of California Press 1988
