= William de la Corner =

13th-century Bishop of Salisbury

- Bishop of Salisbury
- Elected: 24 or 25 November 1288
- Term ended: October 1291
- Predecessor: Lawrence de Awkeburne
- Successor: Nicholas Longespee
- Other post: Archdeacon of Northumberland

Orders
- Consecration: 8 May 1289

Personal details
- Died: October 1291
- Denomination: Catholic

William de la Corner was a medieval Bishop of Salisbury, who had fought a long but unsuccessful battle to become Archbishop of Dublin.

== Biography ==
Corner was a papal chaplain and proctor as well as a royal envoy. He successively held the offices of prebendary of Teinton Regis and Highworth in the diocese of Salisbury, precentor of the diocese of York, Archdeacon of Glendalough and archdeacon of Northumberland.

In 1271, on the death of Fulk Basset, Corner was nominated as Archbishop of Dublin, but faced a rival candidate in Fromund Le Brun, the Lord Chancellor of Ireland: the result was a long and bitter struggle for the office, which required the personal intervention of the Pope, and ended in 1279 with both candidates being disqualified in favour of John de Derlington (although Derlington, detained in England on official business, died in 1284 without reaching Ireland).

Corner was an unsuccessful candidate for the bishopric of Salisbury in March 1288, losing out to Lawrence de Awkeburne. After Lawrence's death, William was elected on 24 November 1288 and consecrated on 8 May 1289.

Corner died in October 1291, probably on the 10th.

Catholic Church titles
Preceded by Lawrence de Awkeburne	Bishop of Salisbury; 1288–1291	Succeeded by Nicholas Longespee
