= John de Sandford =

13th-century Archbishop of Dublin

John de Sandford (died 2 October 1294) was Archbishop of Dublin.

He was the brother of Fulk Basset, archbishop of Dublin, and hence nephew of Sir Philip Basset (d. 1271), the justiciar, and of Fulk Basset, Bishop of London from 1241 until his death in 1259, a prelate who was prominent during the troubles of Henry III's reign.

He first appears as an official of Henry III in Ireland and of Edward I in both England and Ireland; he came to Ireland as his brother's vicar general and was made rector of Maynooth. He was appointed Dean of St. Patrick's Cathedral, Dublin, in 1275, and was prebendary of Howth. 'John de Saunford' is listed as 'escheator of Ireland' c.1282.

In 1284 he was chosen archbishop of Dublin in succession to John de Derlington. Some, however, objected to this choice and Sandford resigned his claim; but he was elected a second time while he was in Rome, and on returning to Ireland was allowed to take up the office. From 1288 to 1290, during a time of great political confusion, the archbishop acted as governor of Ireland. He has been praised as an active and exceptionally conscientious governor.

In 1290 he resigned as governor and returned to England. Sandford served Edward I in the Great Cause over the succession to the Scottish throne in 1292 and also as an envoy to the German king, Adolf of Nassau-Weilburg, and the princes of the Empire. On his return from Germany, he died at Yarmouth on 2 October 1294, of a "grievous distemper". His body was brought to Ireland and buried in his brother's monument at St. Patrick's Cathedral, Dublin.

Catholic Church titles
Preceded by John de Derlington	Archbishop of Dublin; 1286–1294	Succeeded by (unconsecrated) Thomas de Chaddesworth (consecrated) William Houghton
