= Hore Abbey =

Ruined Cistercian monastery in Ireland

- Mainistir Iubhair
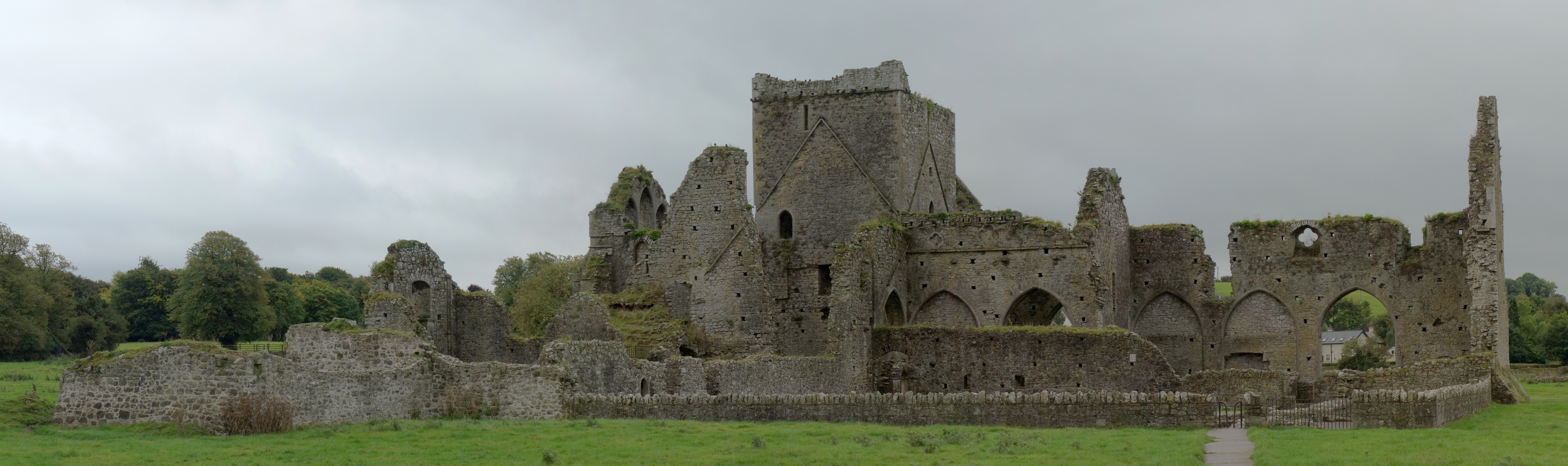
- Hore Abbey from the path towards it

- Location within Ireland

Monastery information
- Other names: Hoare Abbey; St Mary's
- Order: Cistercians
- Established: 1270
- Disestablished: 1540
- Diocese: Cashel and Emly

People
- Founder: Archbishop David Mac Cerbaill

Architecture
- Status: Inactive
- Heritage designation: National Monument of Ireland (#127)
- Style: Cistercian

Site
- Location: Cashel, County Tipperary, Ireland
- Coordinates: 52.5175°N 7.9°W
- Public access: Yes

Hore Abbey (also Hoare Abbey, sometimes known as St Mary's) is a ruined Cistercian monastery near the Rock of Cashel, County Tipperary, Ireland.

'Hore' is thought to derive from 'iubhair' – yew tree. The former Benedictine abbey at Hore was given to the Cistercians by Archbishop David Mac Cerbaill (in 1270), who later entered the monastery, and was buried there in 1289. He endowed the Abbey generously with land, mills and other benefices previously belonging to the town. A story that is much cited by tour guides is that he evicted the Benedictines after a dream that they were about to kill him. This is unlikely to be true and probably arises from the Archbishop's 'interference' with the commerce of the city of Cashel. His disfavour of the established orders in Cashel certainly caused local resentment. He was resented by some of the townspeople, being considered too much in favour of the Irish by the more Anglicised. This is evident in the objection by the thirty-eight local brewers to the levy of two flagons out of every brewing and in the murder of two monks who were visiting the town. He was by all accounts an exceptionally quarrelsome man, who in his long career clashed with the Dean of Cashel, his fellow bishops and the Dublin administration.

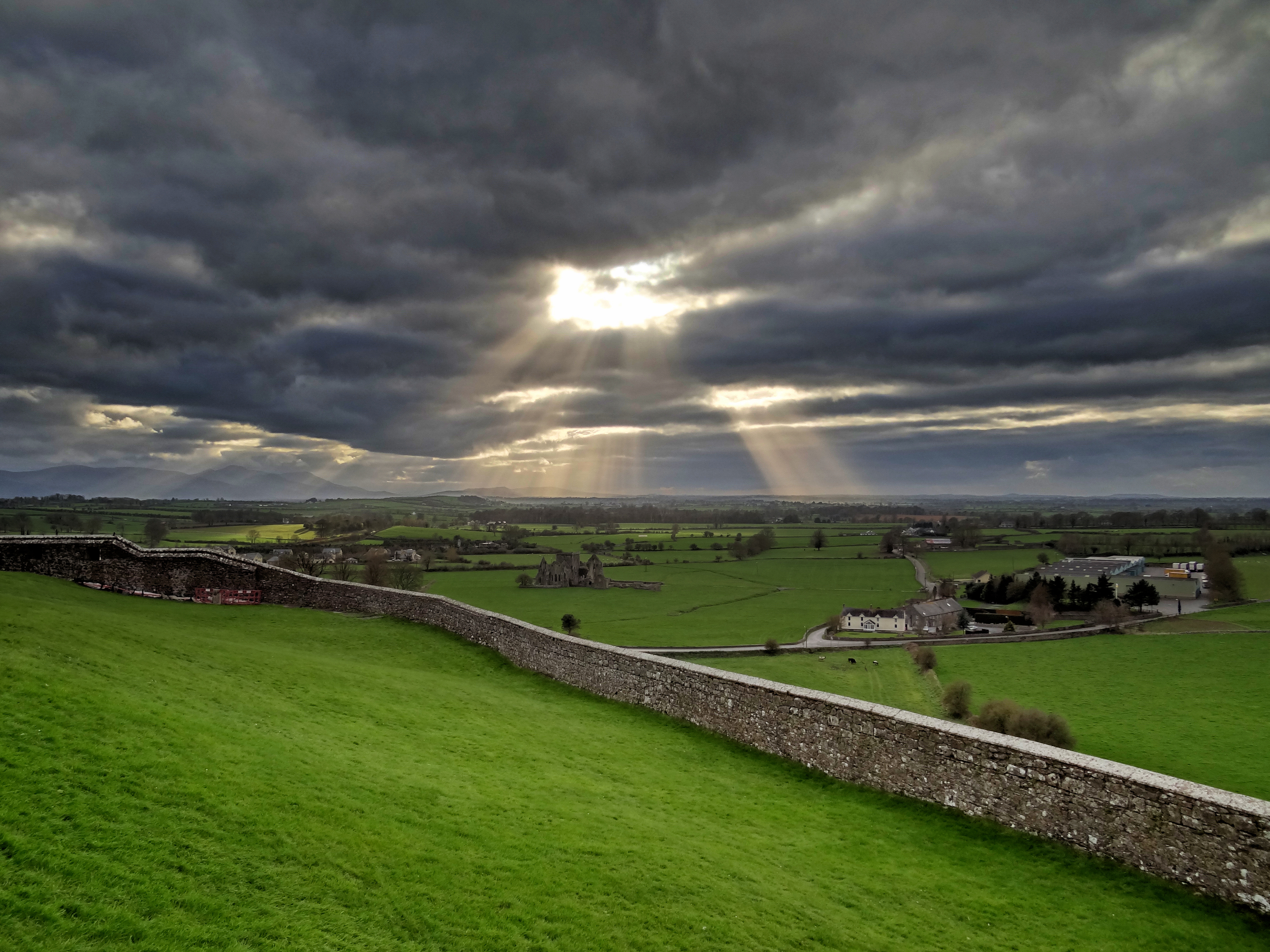
The Hore Abbey ruins as seen from the Rock of Cashel nearby

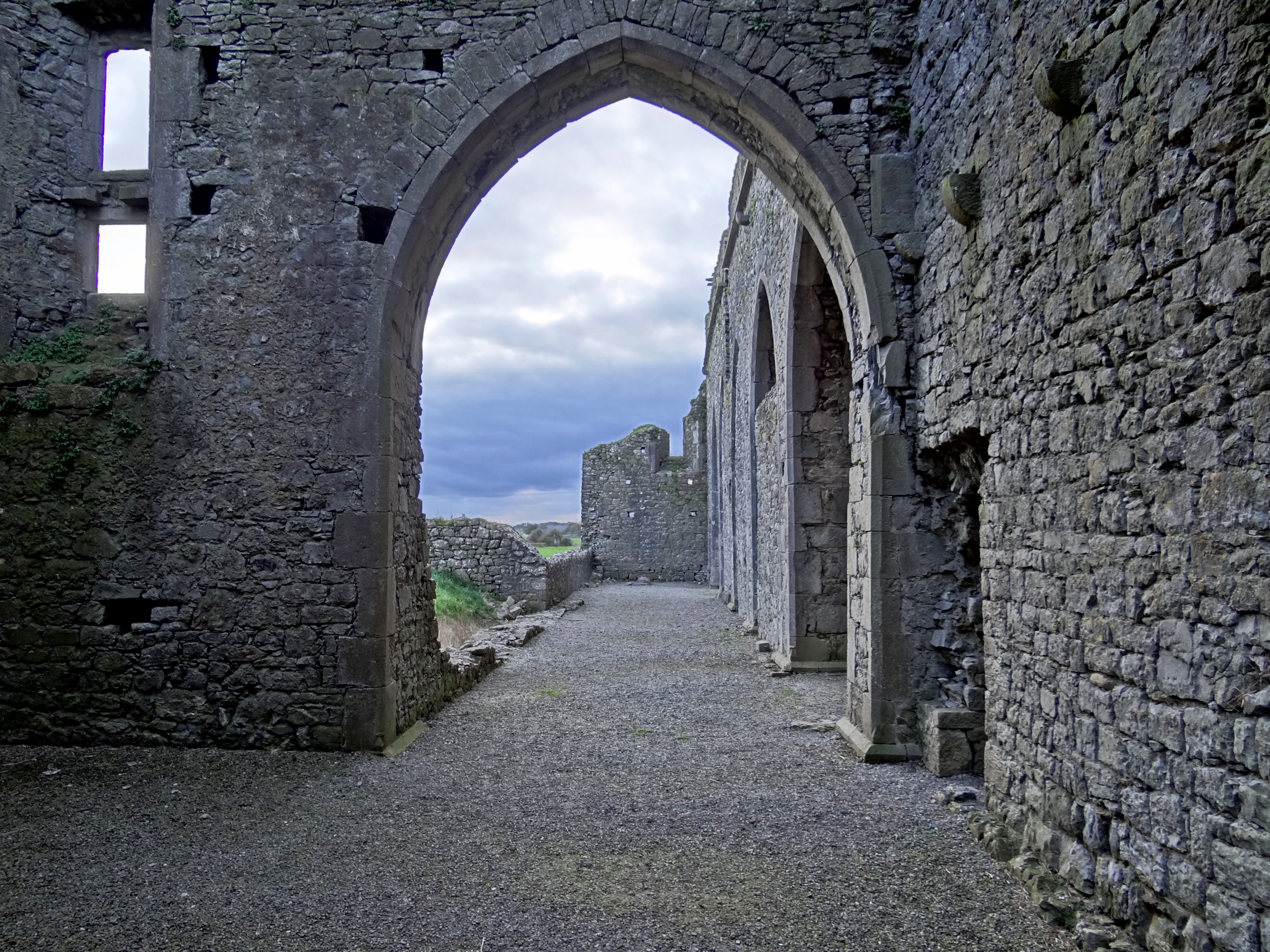
Archway inside the ruins

== Chronology ==
- 1269 Archbishop David Mac Cerbaill made profession of the Cistercian rule, though remaining as Archbishop of Cashel
- 1270 Founded from Mellifont" the last Cistercian foundation in Ireland before the dissolution of the monasteries
- 1540 Dissolved and property transferred to James Butler, 9th Earl of Ormond. Monks continued to serve the local parish. Later occupied as private dwellings
- 1561 Lands granted by Elizabeth I to Sir Henry Radcliffe

== Architecture ==
Hore Abbey is distinctive among Irish Cistercian monasteries in that the cloister lies to the north. The siting of the Abbey, with the Rock of Cashel close by to the north, may explain this departure from the usual arrangement.

== See also ==
- List of abbeys and priories in Ireland (County Tipperary)

== Sources ==
- Breen, Aidan "Mac Cerbaill (MacCarwell), David" Cambridge Dictionary of Irish Biography
- Otway-Ruthven, A. J. A History of Medieval Ireland Barnes and Noble reissue New York 1993
