= John de Derlington =

English theologian

John de Derlington (John of Darlington) (died 1284) was an English Dominican, Archbishop of Dublin and theologian.

== Life ==
Derlington became a Dominican friar, and it has been inferred that he studied at Paris at the Dominican priory of St Jacques, because his name is mentioned as working on the second edition (Concordantiæ Magnæ, about 1250) of Hugues de St Cher's Latin concordance. In 1256 he was made a member of Henry III's council, and taken into the king's confidence, also at some point becoming Henry's confessor.

In 1256 Derlington persuaded the king to release a converted Jew of Lincoln, imprisoned on suspicion of complicity in the murder of a child. In 1258 he helped draw up the Provisions of Oxford, as one of the king's nominees; in 1263 he was present at the drawing up of the instrument by which Henry III agreed to submit the questions arising from the provisions of Oxford to the arbitration of Louis IX.

In August 1278 Derlington was part of a mission to Rome from Edward I with William of Louth and Henry of Newark. In negotiations with Pope Nicholas III, he was appointed a collector of papal revenue in England. The collection of the "tenth" was a long task, but it had hardly begun when Derlington was raised to the see of Dublin, which had been vacant since the death of Fulk Basset in 1271. The appointment was the Pope's personal choice, made to resolve a confusing situation involving a bitter struggle between two rival nominees, Fromund Le Brun and William de la Corner. Edward received Derlington's homage and fealty on 27 April 1279, and the next day restored him to his temporalities. He was consecrated on 26 August, at Waltham Abbey, by Archbishop John Peckham. The contentious collection of the tenth kept Derlington from his see, and the king allowed him to be represented by an attorney in Ireland, and gave him special license to remain in England.

Other troubles also detained Derlington, including a clash with Peckham. In 1283 Edward I seized the collected tenth for the crusade, but then was compelled to give it up. With other business over, Derlington set off for Ireland, but had not gone far from London, when he went down with a mortal sickness. He died on 28 March 1284, and was buried in the choir of Blackfriars church in London.

Catholic Church titles
Preceded by Fulk Basset	Archbishop of Dublin; 1279–1284	Succeeded by John de Sandford

== Notes ==
Attribution

This article incorporates text from a publication now in the public domain: Stephen, Leslie, ed. (1888). "Darlington, John of". Dictionary of National Biography. Vol. 14. London: Smith, Elder & Co.
