= Fulk Basset =

Fulk Basset (died 4 May 1271) was archbishop of Dublin. He was the elder brother of John de Sandford, who was also Archbishop of Dublin from 1284 to 1290.

He was called Fulk de Sandford and also Fulk Basset, owing to his relationship to the prominent landowning Basset family of Devon and Cornwall. Having been Archdeacon of Middlesex and treasurer and chancellor of St Paul's Cathedral, London, he was appointed archbishop of Dublin by Pope Alexander IV in 1256, after the Pope rejected the election by the canons of St Patrick's Cathedral, Dublin of Ralph de Norwich, the Lord Chancellor of Ireland, whom he considered to be too worldly and luxurious in his manner of living, and essentially a secular official "entirely devoted to the King's interests".

He took some slight part in the government of Ireland under Henry III, although he refused an offer to become Justiciar of Ireland, no doubt fearing that so onerous an office was beyond his abilities. He died in Finglas on 4 May 1271. He was buried in St. Patrick's Cathedral, Dublin; his brother John was buried in the same tomb in 1294.

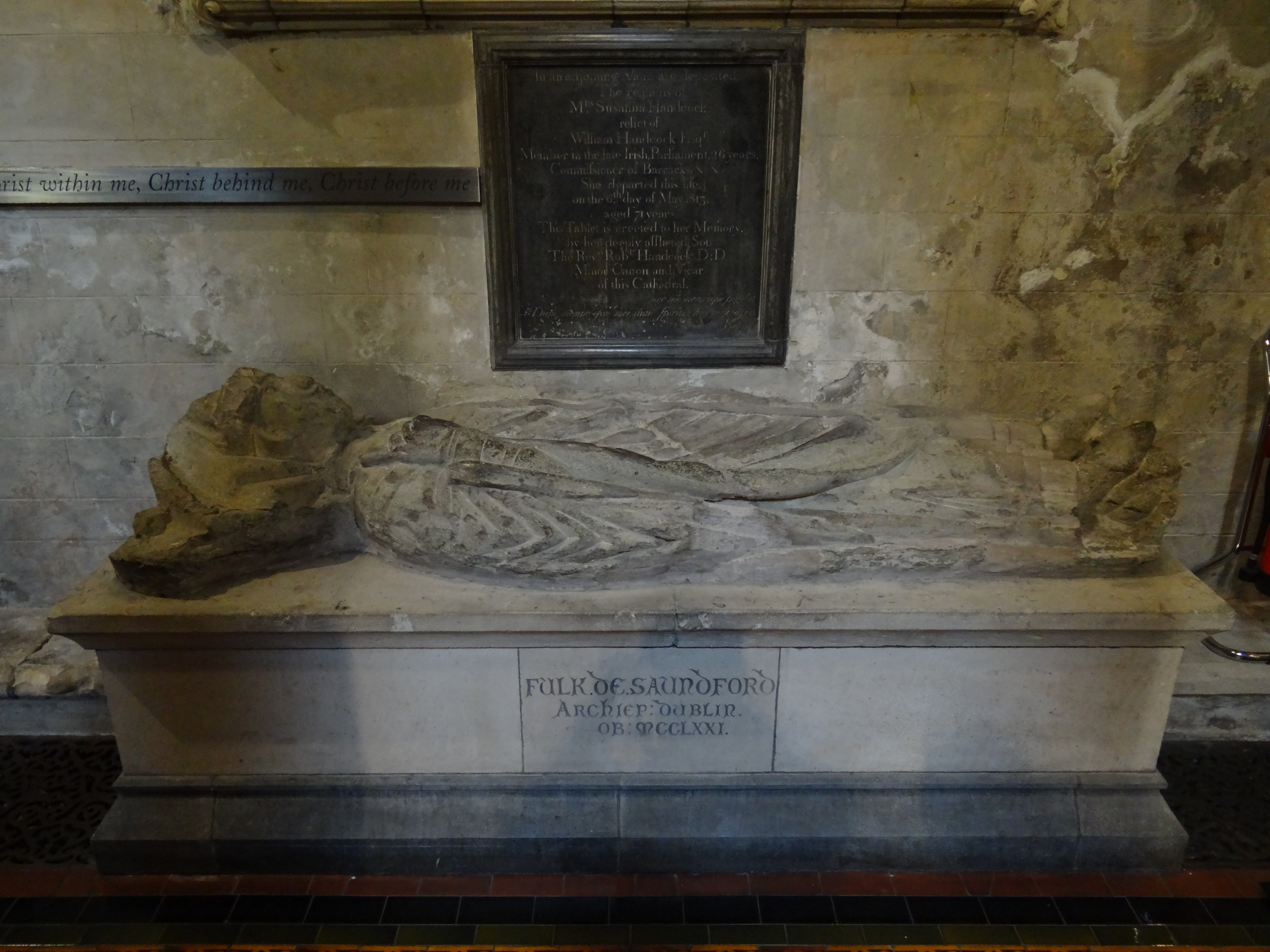
The tomb of Fulk Basset

His death led to a long struggle between rival candidates for the See, Fromund Le Brun and William de la Corner, which was not resolved until 1279, when they were both passed over in favour of John de Derlington, who died in England before he could assume office as Archbishop. His successor was Fulke's brother John, who preferred to use the surname de Sandford.

== Sources ==
Religious titles
| Preceded by Luke | Archbishop of Dublin; 1256–1271 | Succeeded by John de Derlington |
