= St Patrick's Cathedral, Dublin =

National cathedral of the Church of Ireland

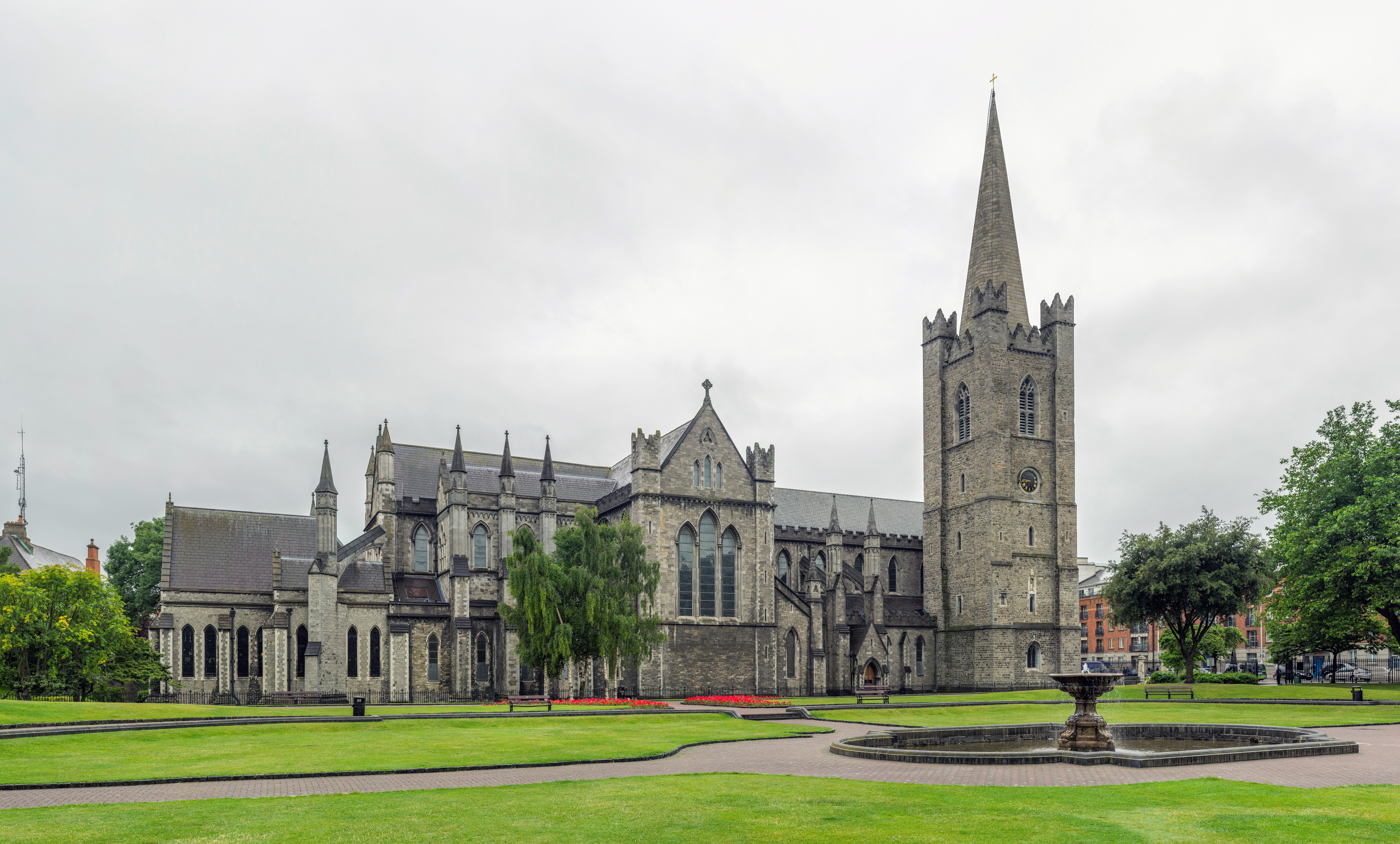

- Location within Central Dublin
- 53°20′22″N 6°16′17″W
- Location: St Patrick's Close, Patrick Street, Dublin 8
- Country: Ireland
- Language: English
- Denomination: Church of Ireland
- Previous denomination: Roman Catholic (1191–1540)
- Churchmanship: Broad Church
- Website: stpatrickscathedral.ie

History
- Founded: 1191
- Founder: John Comyn
- Dedication: Saint Patrick

Architecture
- Style: Gothic

Specifications
- Length: 287 ft (87 m) (internal); 300 ft (91 m) (external)
- Width: 160 ft (49 m) (across transepts)

Administration
- Province: Dublin
- Diocese: Dublin and Glendalough

Clergy
- Dean: W. W. Morton
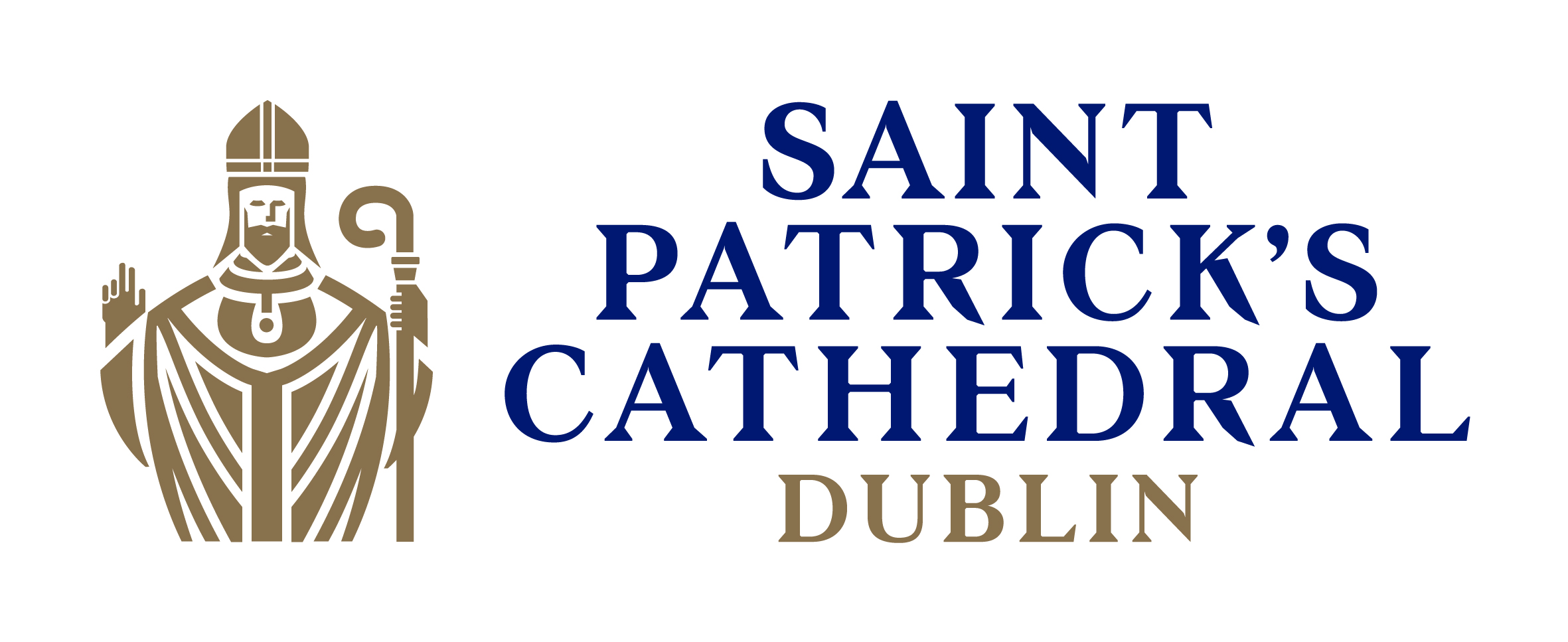

Saint Patrick's Cathedral (Irish: Ard-Eaglais Naomh Pádraig) in Dublin, Ireland is the national cathedral of the Church of Ireland. Christ Church Cathedral, also a Church of Ireland cathedral in Dublin, is designated as the local cathedral of the Diocese of Dublin and Glendalough.

== Background ==
Unusually, St Patrick's is not the seat of a bishop, as the Archbishop of Dublin has his seat in the nearby Christ Church Cathedral; the two cathedrals are about 400 metres apart. Since 1870, the Church of Ireland has designated St Patrick's as the national cathedral for the whole of Ireland, drawing chapter members from each of the 12 dioceses of the Church of Ireland. The dean is the ordinary for the cathedral; this office has existed since 1219. The most famous office holder was Jonathan Swift.

=== Status ===
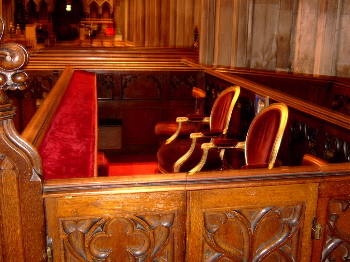
State pew of the President of Ireland, still retains a British Standard carving on the front

Some believe it was intended that St Patrick's, a secular (diocesan clergy who are not members of a religious order, i.e. under a rule and, therefore, "regular") cathedral, would replace Christ Church, a cathedral managed by an order.

A confrontational situation persisted, with considerable tension, over the decades after the establishment of St Patrick's, and was eventually settled, more or less, by the signing of a six-point agreement of 1300, Pacis Compositio. Still extant, and in force until 1870, it provided that:

- The consecration and enthronement of the Archbishop of Dublin was to take place at Christ Church – records show that this provision was not always followed, with many archbishops enthroned in both, and at least two in Saint Patrick's only
- Christ Church had formal precedence, as the mother and senior cathedral of the diocese
- Christ Church was to retain the cross, mitre and ring of each deceased Archbishop of Dublin
- Deceased Archbishops of Dublin were to be buried alternately in each of the two cathedrals, unless they personally willed otherwise
- The annual consecration of chrism oil for the diocese was to take place at Christ Church
- The two cathedrals were to act as one and shared equally in their freedoms.

Over the following centuries, the two cathedrals functioned together in the diocese, until in the period of disestablishment of the Church of Ireland, the current designation of one as the cathedral of Dublin and Glendalough, and one as the national cathedral, was developed.

== History ==
=== Pre-Reformation period ===
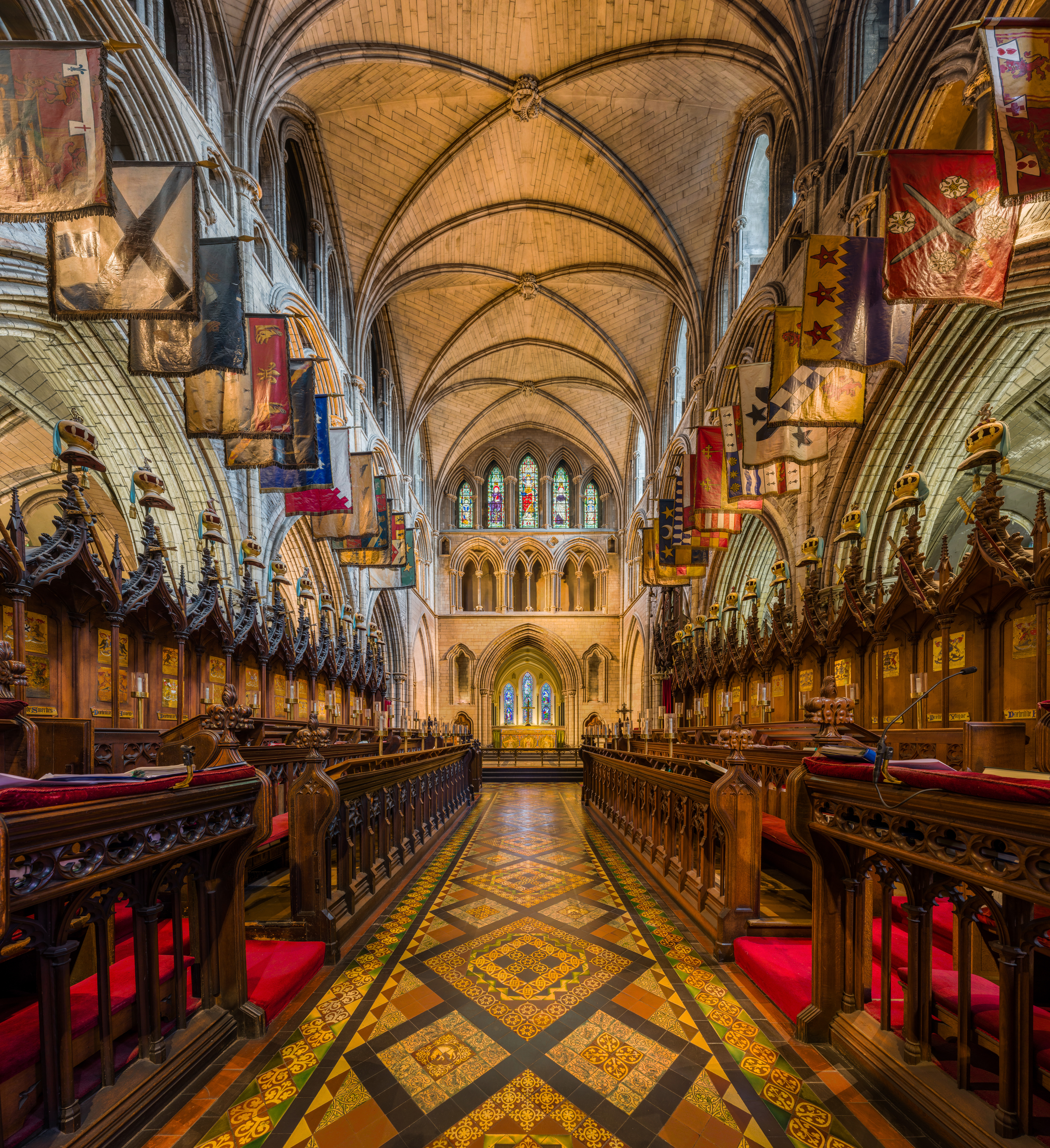
Choir of St Patrick's Cathedral

In 1192, John Comyn, first Anglo-Norman archbishop of Dublin, elevated one of the four Dublin Celtic parish churches, this one dedicated to Saint Patrick, beside a holy well of the same name and on an island between two branches of the River Poddle, to the status of a collegiate church, i.e., a church with a body of clergy devoted to both worship and learning. The new collegiate church fell outside the city boundaries, and this move created two new civic territories, one under the archbishop's temporal jurisdiction. The church was dedicated to "God, our Blessed Lady Mary and St Patrick" on 17 March 1191.

Comyn's charter of 1191 or 1192, which allowed for a chapter of thirteen canons, of which three held special dignities (as chancellor, precentor and treasurer), was confirmed by a papal bull (of Pope Celestine III) within a year. The thirteen prebendaries attached to the church were provided with archepiscopal lands.

Over time, a whole complex of buildings arose in the vicinity of the cathedral, including the Palace of the St Sepulchre (seat of the archbishop), and legal jurisdiction was divided between a Liberty controlled by the dean, around the cathedral, and a larger one belonging to the archbishop, adjacent.

While it is not clear when precisely the church was further raised to the status of a cathedral, a unique move in a city with an existing cathedral, it was probably after 1192, and Comyn's successor as Archbishop, Henry de Loundres, was elected in 1212 by the chapters of both Christ Church and St Patrick's, this election being recognised by Pope Innocent III. See below for more on the question of status. Henry granted a number of further charters to the cathedral and chapter between 1218 and 1220, and one of these in 1220 created the office of dean to head the cathedral, the right of an election being allocated solely to the canons of the Chapter.

The basis of the present building, as noted, the largest church in Ireland, was built between 1191 and 1270, though little now remains of the earliest work beyond the baptistry. Much of the work was overseen by the previously mentioned Henry of London, a friend of the King of England and signatory of the Magna Carta, who was also involved in the construction of Dublin's city walls, and Dublin Castle.

An order from King Henry III in 1225 allowed the collection of donations from across the island for reconstruction for a period of four years, and the work, in the Early English Gothic style, lasted at least until rededication in 1254. The Lady Chapel was added around 1270.

In 1300, Archbishop Ferings of Dublin arranged an agreement between the two cathedrals, the Pacis Compositio, which acknowledged both as cathedrals and made some provisions to accommodate their shared status. For more, see Status below.

In 1311 the Medieval University of Dublin was founded here with William de Rodyard, Dean of St Patrick's, as its first Chancellor, and the Canons as its members. It never flourished and was suppressed at the Reformation.

From the mid-14th century, and for over 500 years, the north transept of the building was used as the parish church of St Nicholas Without (i.e. the part of the Parish of St Nicholas outside the city proper).

The tower (Minot's Tower) and west nave were rebuilt between 1362 and 1370, following a fire. The name commemorates Thomas Minot, Archbishop of Dublin 1363–75, who oversaw the rebuilding.

From the very earliest years, there were problems with seepage of water, with a number of floods, especially in the later years of the 18th century, caused by the surrounding branches of the River Poddle – even in the 20th century, it is reported that the water table was within 2.3 metres (7.5 feet) of the floor. This situation ensured there would never be a crypt or basement area.

=== Reformation period ===
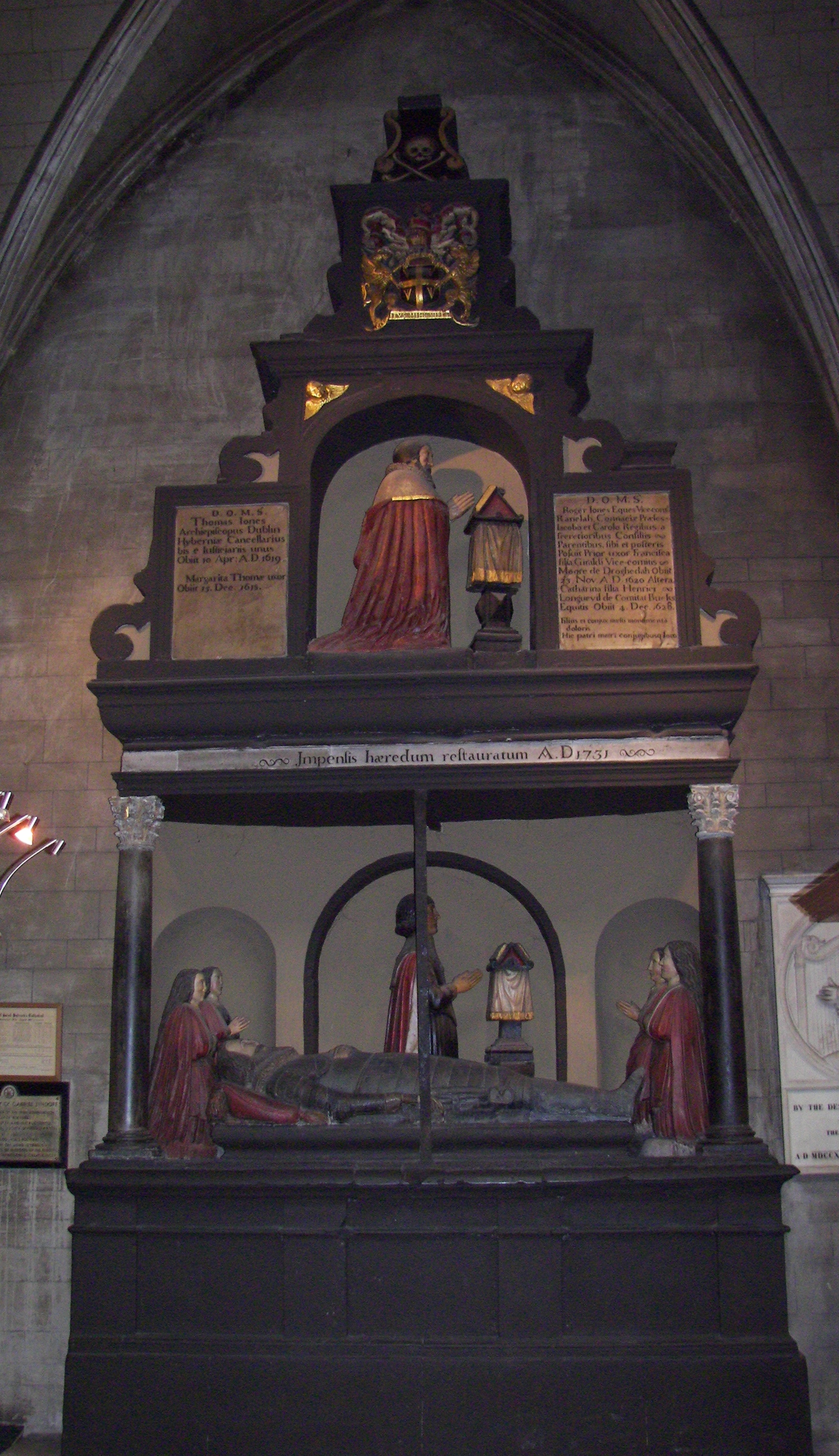
Memorial to Thomas Jones, Dean of St Patrick's from 1581 to 1585

After the English Reformation (an uneven process between 1536 and 1564 but at St Patrick's effective from about 1537), St Patrick's became an Anglican (Church of Ireland) church. In the 1530s some images within the cathedral were defaced by soldiers under Thomas Cromwell, and neglect led to the collapse of the nave in 1544. The conventionally flexible style of the Archbishop of Dublin Hugh Curwen is instructive; he was a follower firstly of Henry's non-reformed church in the 1530s, then of Edward VI's full-blown Protestantism c. 1550, then accepting his appointment as archbishop during Queen Mary's reversion of the church to Roman Catholicism in 1555, and continued to serve as the archbishop, using the Anglican rite from 1559, under Queen Elizabeth until 1567.

Under Edward VI, St Patrick's Cathedral was formally suppressed and the building was demoted back to the status of a parish church. On 25 April 1547, a pension of 200 marks sterling was assigned to "Sir Edward Basnet", the dean, followed, some months later, by pensions of £60 each to Chancellor Alien and Precentor Humphrey, and £40 to Archdeacon Power. The silver, jewels, and ornaments were transferred to the dean and chapter of Christ Church. The King designated part of the building for use as a courthouse, the cathedral grammar school was established in the vicar's hall and the deanery was given to the archbishop, following the transfer of the Archbishop's Palace to the Lord Deputy of Ireland. In 1549, it was further ordered that the walls be repainted and inscribed with passages from the scriptures.

In 1555 a charter of the joint monarchs Philip and Mary I restored the cathedral's privileges and initiated restoration and a late document of Queen Mary's reign, a deed dated 27 April 1558, comprises a release or receipt by Thomas Leverous, the new dean, and the chapter of St Patrick's, of the "goods, chattels, musical instruments, etc.", belonging to the cathedral, and which had been in the possession of the dean and chapter of Christ Church. It was during this reign that the patronal festival of the Blessed Virgin Mary was last celebrated (in 1558).

Following the ejection of the Catholic chapter of canons in 1559, the Catholic community continued in the 1560s–1570s at least to go on nominating canons and the principal dignitaries to St Patrick's.

In 1560, one of Dublin's first public clocks was erected in "St Patrick's Steeple".

=== 17th century ===
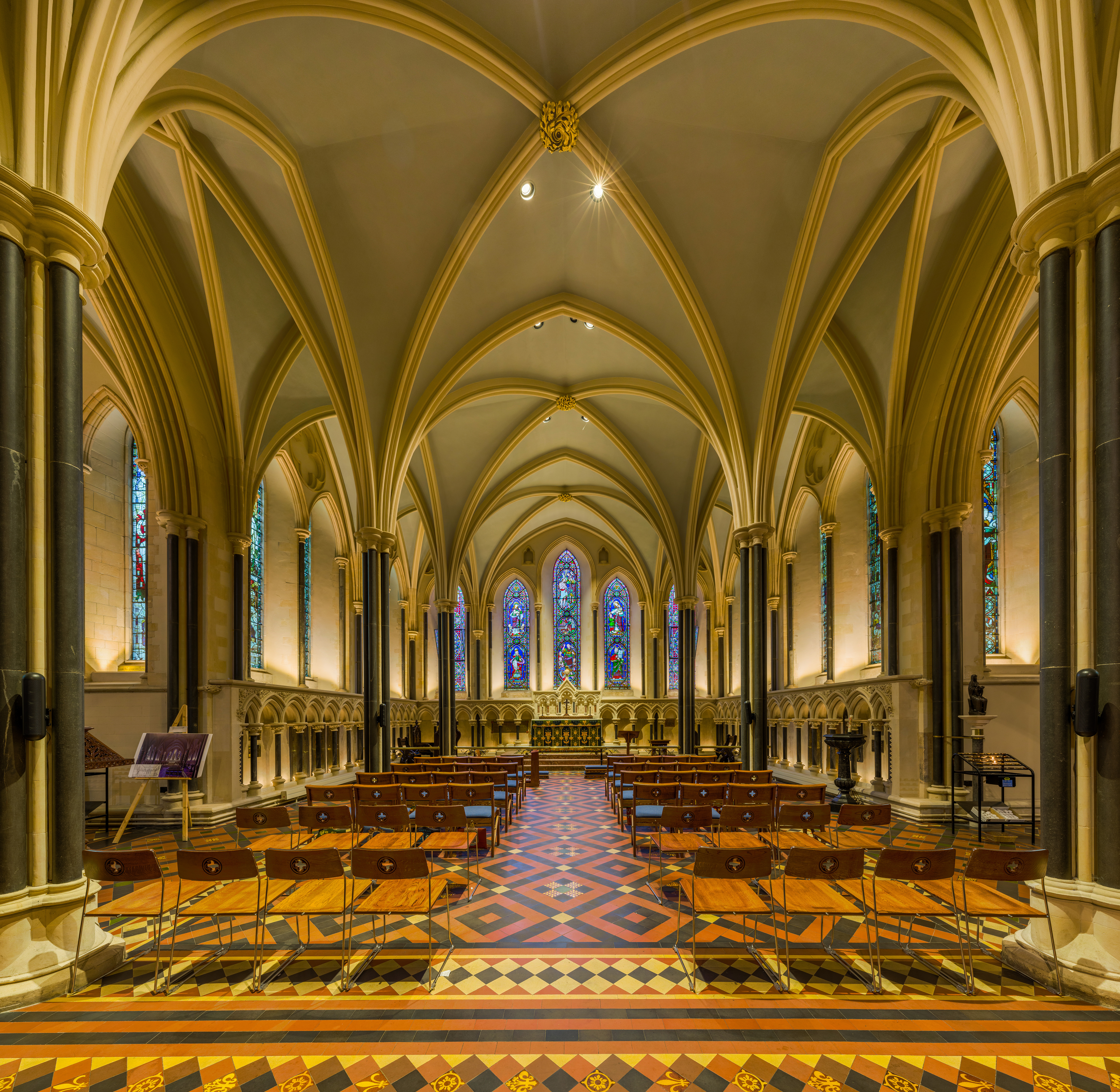
Lady Chapel in Saint Patrick's Cathedral today.

By the early 17th century, the Lady Chapel was said to have been in ruins, and the arch at the east end of the choir was closed off by a lath and plaster partition wall. There was also routine flooding and a series of galleries was added to accommodate large congregations. In 1620 the English-born judge Luke Gernon referred to the cathedral's poor state of repair.

During the stay of Oliver Cromwell in Dublin, during his conquest of Ireland the Commonwealth's Lord Protector stabled his horses in the nave of the cathedral. This was intended to demonstrate Cromwell's disrespect for the Anglican religion, which he associated with Roman Catholicism and political Royalism.

After the Restoration of the monarchy in 1660, repairs to the building were begun.

In 1666, the cathedral chapter offered the Lady Chapel for the use of French-speaking Huguenots who had fled to Ireland, and after some repair and preparation works, it became known as L'Eglise Française de St Patrick. A lease was signed on 23 December 1665 and was renewed from time to time until the special services ceased in 1816, by which time the Huguenots had been fully assimilated into the city population.

In 1668 the roof, in danger of collapsing, was taken down, and a new roof was completed by 1671. Buttresses were erected and the west window was replaced with a perpendicular window. Then, in the 1680s, the choir was reformed. In 1688–90, during the Williamite War in Ireland, James II and his fellow Catholics briefly repossessed St Patrick's. However, the victory of the Protestant Williamites in this war meant that the cathedral was restored to Anglican ownership in 1690 when James abandoned Dublin after his defeat at the Battle of the Boyne.

=== 18th century ===
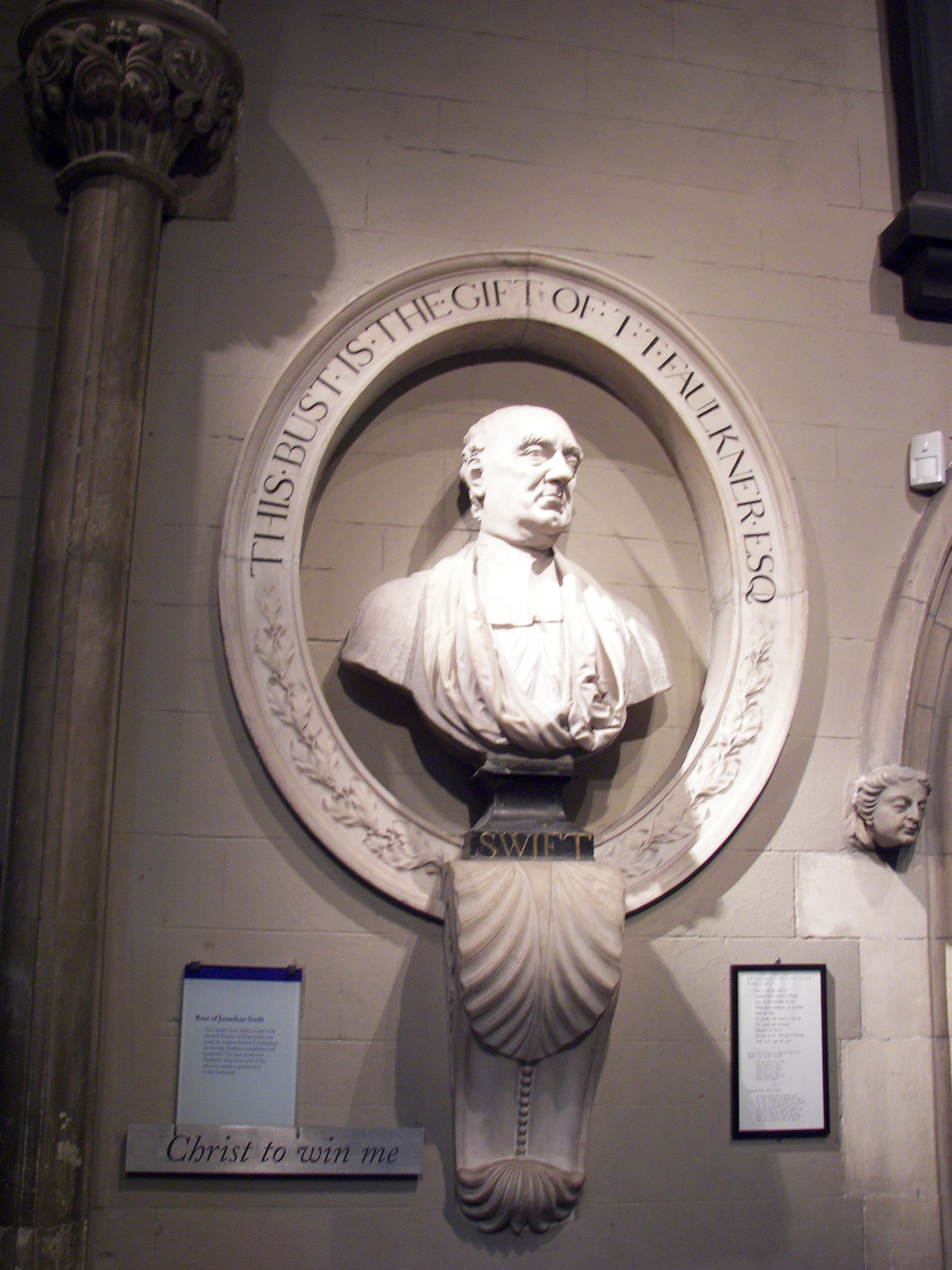
Bust of Jonathan Swift

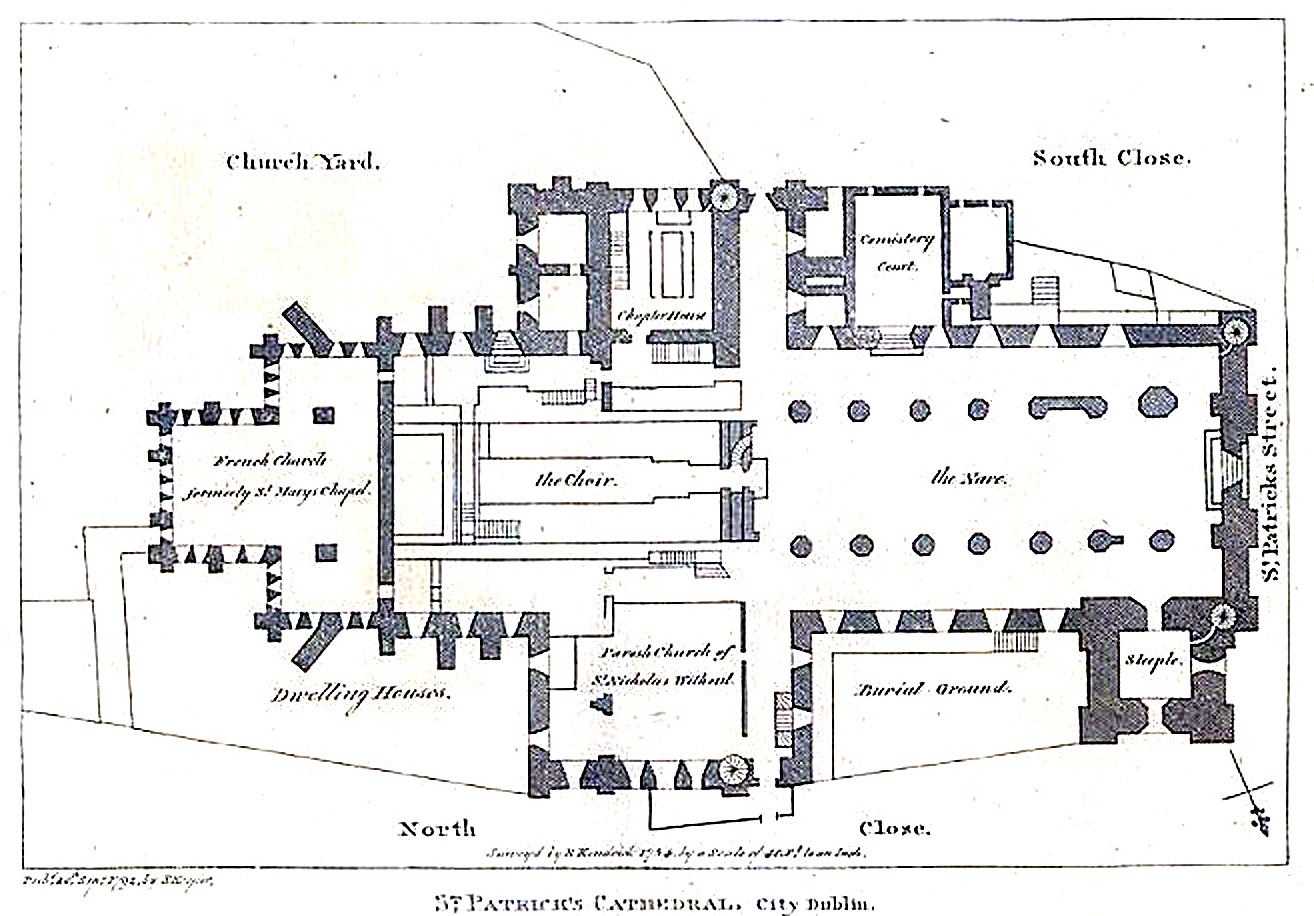
Mid 18th century floor plan

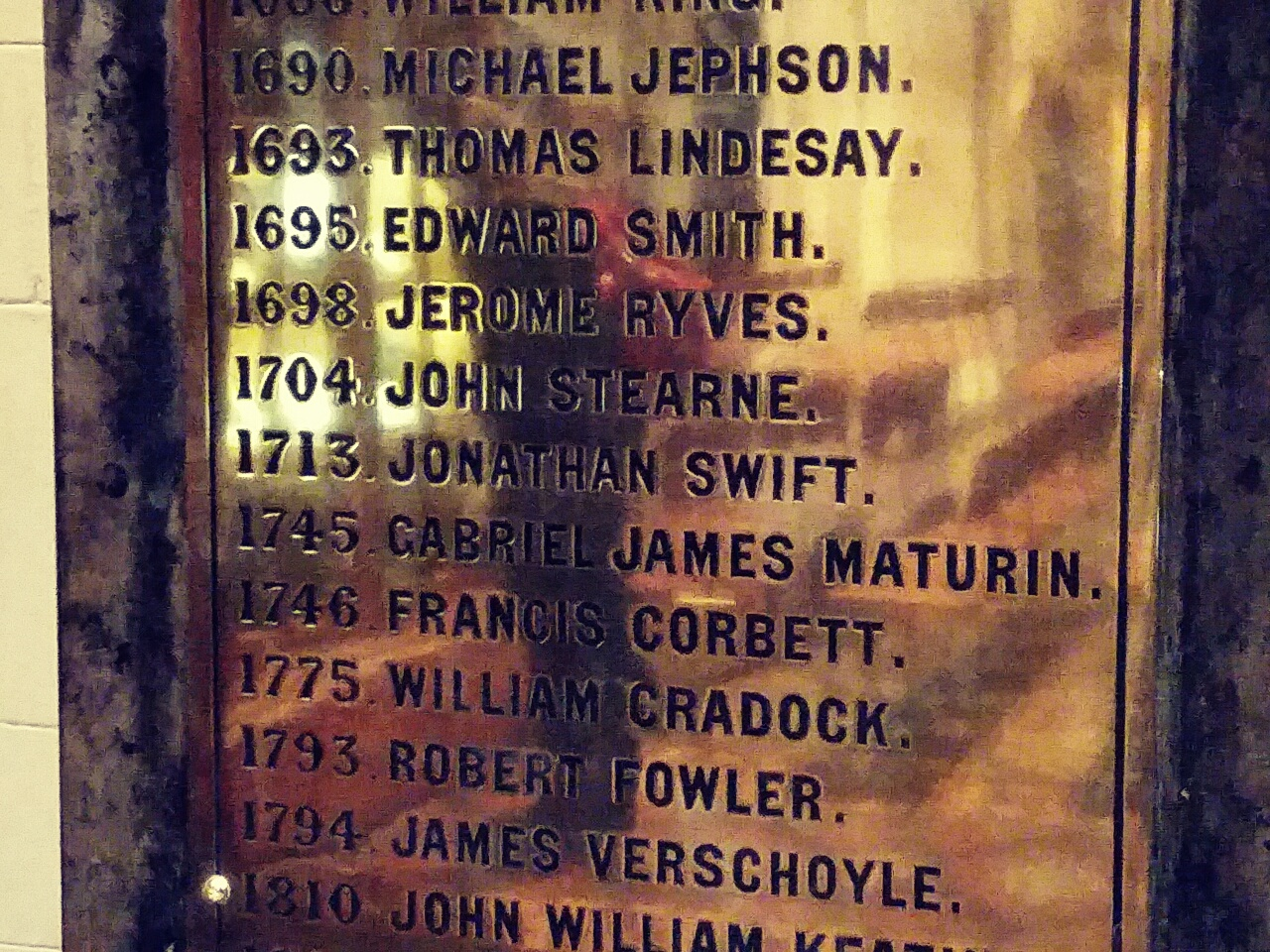
brass plate listing deans of the cathedral, including Jonathan Swift

Throughout its long history, the cathedral has contributed much to Irish life, and one key aspect of this relates to the writer and satirist Jonathan Swift, author of Gulliver's Travels, who was dean of the cathedral from 1713 to 1745. Many of his famous sermons and "Irish tracts" (such as the Drapier's Letters) were given during his stay as Dean.

His grave and epitaph can be seen in the cathedral, along with those of his friend Stella. Swift took a great interest in the building, its services and music and in what would now be called social welfare, funding an almshouse for poor women and Saint Patrick's Hospital.

The Choir School, which had been founded in 1432, supplied many of its members to take part in the very first performance of Handel's Messiah in 1742.

In 1749, the cathedral spire was added by George Semple; it remains one of Dublin's landmarks.

In 1792, divine service was temporarily suspended due to the poor condition of the south wall, then 60 centimetres (2 feet) out of perpendicular, and of parts of the roof.

==== Chivalric chapels ====
- Knights of St Patrick. From 1783 until 1871 the cathedral served as the Chapel of the Most Illustrious Order of Saint Patrick, members of which were the Knights of St Patrick. With the disestablishment of the Church of Ireland in 1871, the installation ceremony moved to St Patrick's Hall, Dublin Castle. The heraldic banners of the knights at the time of the change still hang over the choir stalls to this day.
- Paris-Malta obedience of the Order of Saint Lazarus (statuted 1910). The cathedral contains the so-called Dunsany Chapel which is the spiritual home of the order in Ireland. The decoration of the chapel was provided for by Randall Plunkett, 19th Lord Dunsany, who established the order in Ireland in 1962. The cathedral is used for its investiture ceremonies and the dean of the cathedral is an Ecclesiastical Commander of the order.

=== 19th century ===
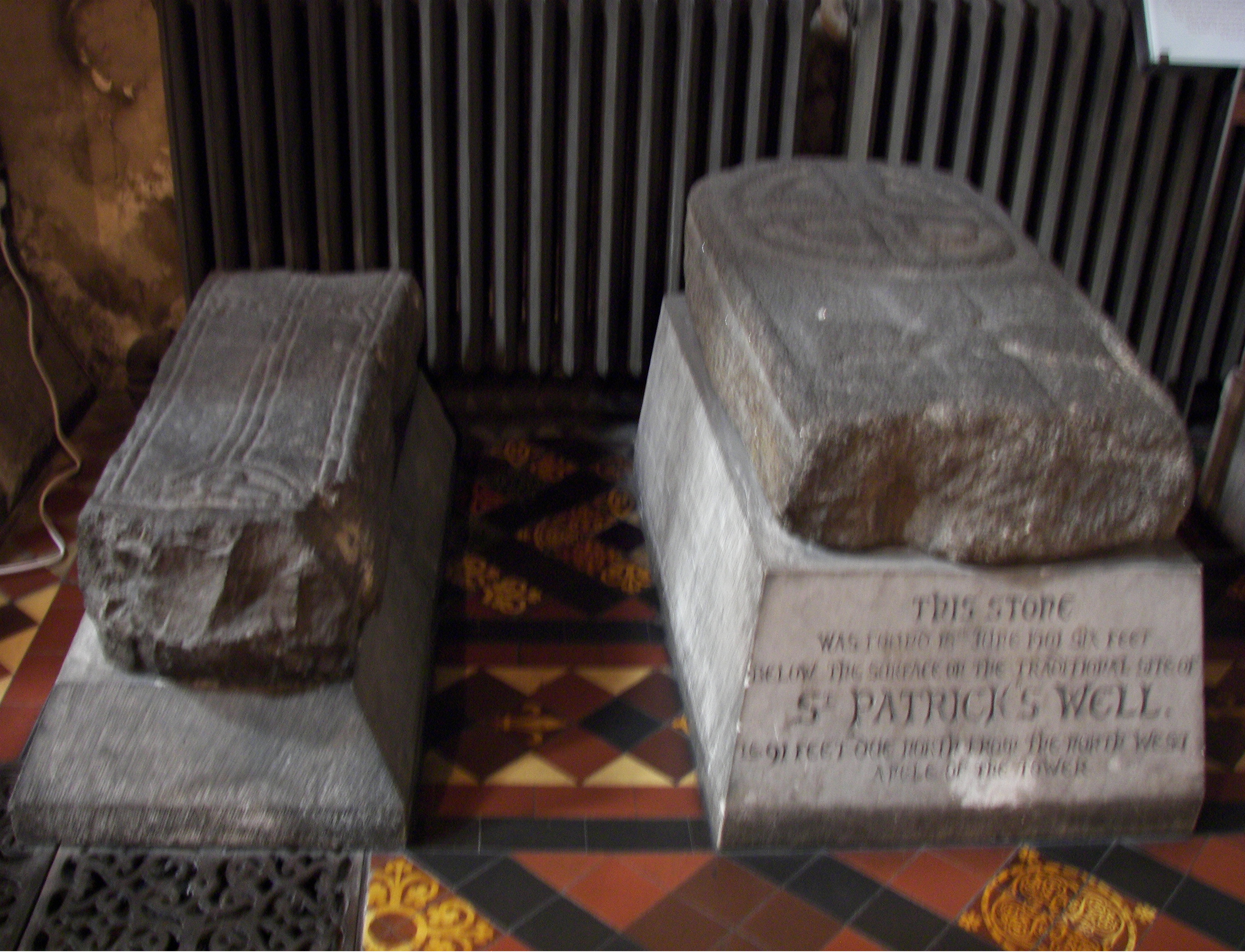
Celtic cross discovered near the church in the 19th century.

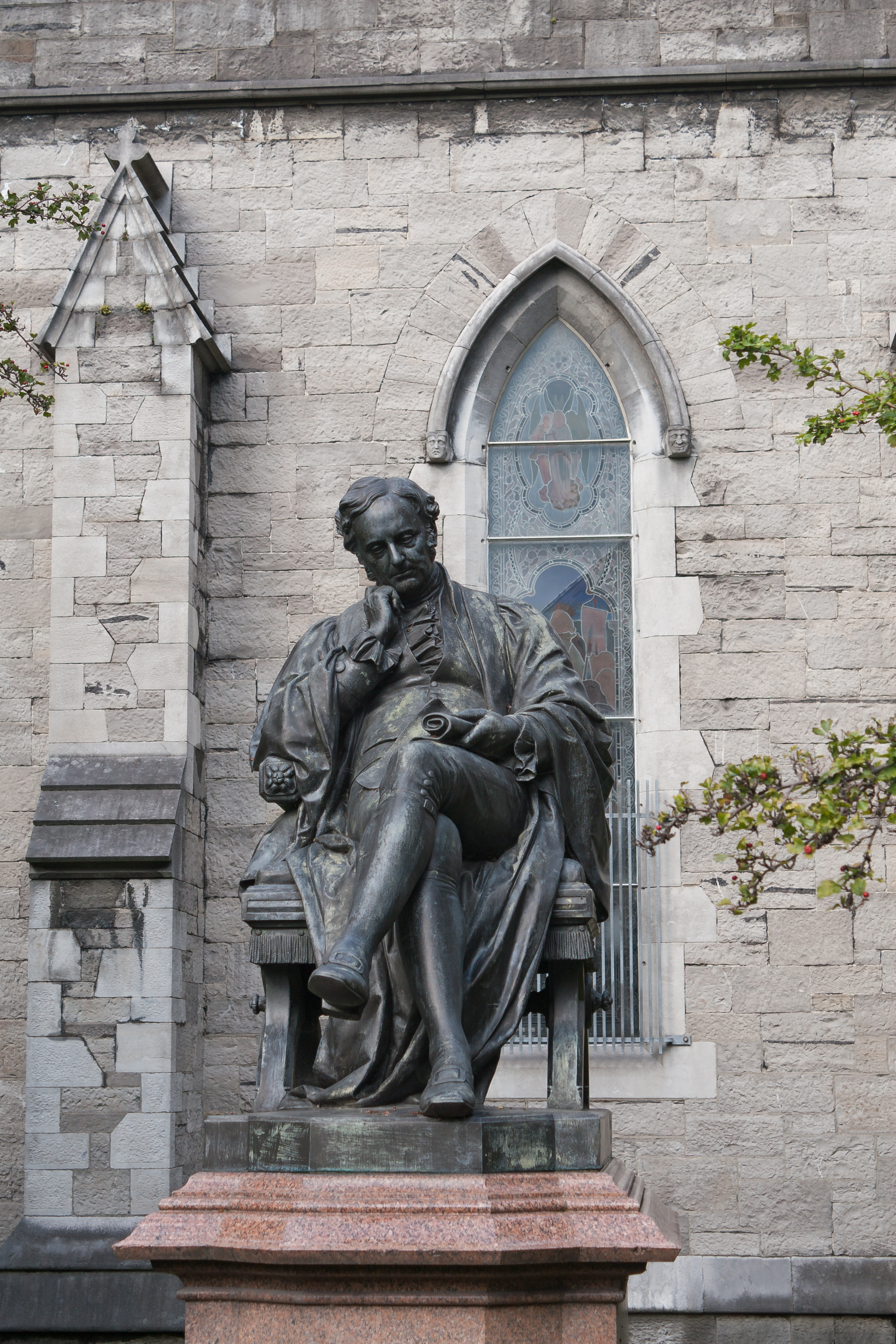
Bronze statue of Sir Benjamin Lee Guinness by John Henry Foley, erected in 1875.

By 1805, the north transept was in ruins and the south transept was in a poor condition; urgent work was carried out on the nave roof, held up by scaffolding.

In 1846, the post of Dean of Saint Patrick's was united with that of Dean of Christ Church, a situation which lasted in law until 1872.

An attempt at major restoration began under the direction of Dean Pakenham (Dean, 1843–1864), limited by poor economic circumstances. The Lady Chapel was restored, the floor (then raised several metres) reduced to its original level and other urgent matters were at least partly addressed.

In the mid-19th century, a Celtic cross was found buried near the cathedral. This has been preserved, and it is thought it may have marked the site of the former holy well.

The major reconstruction, paid for by Benjamin Guinness, in 1860–65, and inspired by the fear that the cathedral was in imminent danger of collapse, means that much of the current building and decoration dates from the Victorian era; medieval chantries were removed among other actions, and few records of the work survive today.

Though the rebuilding ensured the survival of the cathedral, the failure to preserve records of the scale of the rebuild means that little is known as to how much of the current building is genuinely mediæval and how much is Victorian pastiche. Sir Benjamin's statue by JH Foley is outside the south door. His son Arthur (also a brewer) came in for humorous but gentle criticism when he donated a stained glass window of 'Rebecca at the well'; its motto read: 'I was thirsty and ye gave me drink'. In 1901 his son Edward created the adjacent "St Patrick's Park" from an area of decrepit housing and donated a new set of bells to the cathedral.

The other great change for the cathedral occurred in 1871 when, following the disestablishment of the Church of Ireland, the newly independent church at its general synod finally resolved the "two cathedrals" issue, making Christ Church the sole and undisputed cathedral of the Dublin diocese and St Patrick's the national cathedral.

== Present ==
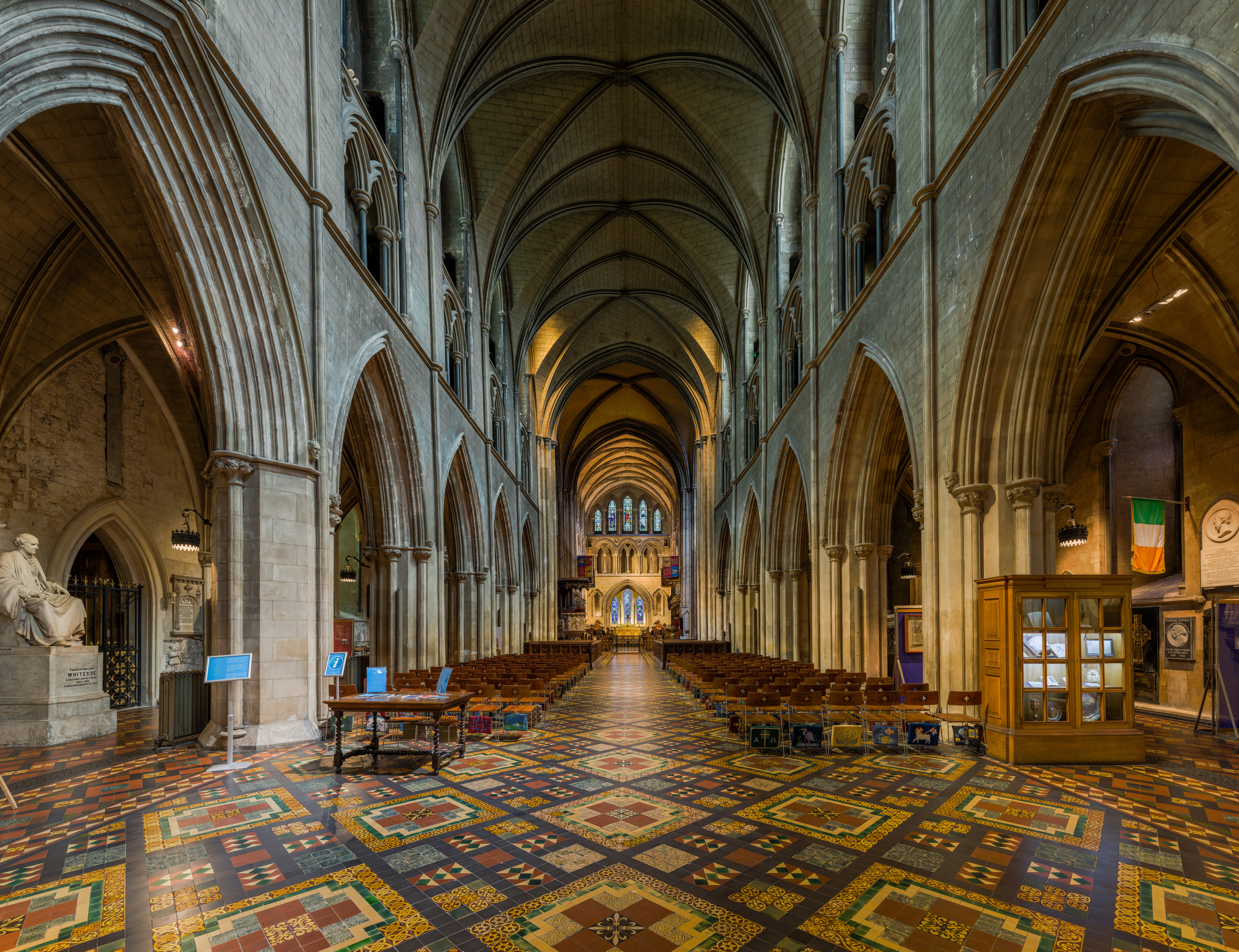
The nave as viewed from the western end

The cathedral plays host to a number of public national ceremonies. Ireland's Remembrance Day ceremonies, hosted by the Royal British Legion and attended by the President of Ireland, take place there every November. Its carol service (the Service of Nine Lessons and Carols), celebrated twice in December, including every 24 December, is a colourful feature of Dublin life.

On Saturdays in autumn, the cathedral hosts the graduation ceremonies of Technological University Dublin.

The funerals of two Irish presidents, Douglas Hyde and Erskine Childers, took place there in 1949 and 1974 respectively. At President Hyde's funeral, the whole of the Irish government and opposition contingent, but for Childers and Noel Browne, stayed in the foyer of the church. This was because, at the time of the funeral, the Holy See forbade Roman Catholics from entering the churches of other Christian traditions. Because President Childers died in office, his state funeral was a major state occasion. The attendance included foreign dignitaries King Baudouin of Belgium, Vice-President of the United States Spiro T. Agnew (representing President Richard Nixon), Earl Mountbatten of Burma (representing Queen Elizabeth II), British Prime Minister Harold Wilson and former British prime minister Edward Heath.

In 2006, the cathedral's national prominence was used by a group of 18 Afghan migrants seeking asylum, who occupied it for several days before being persuaded to leave without trouble.

== Governance ==
=== Dean and chapter ===
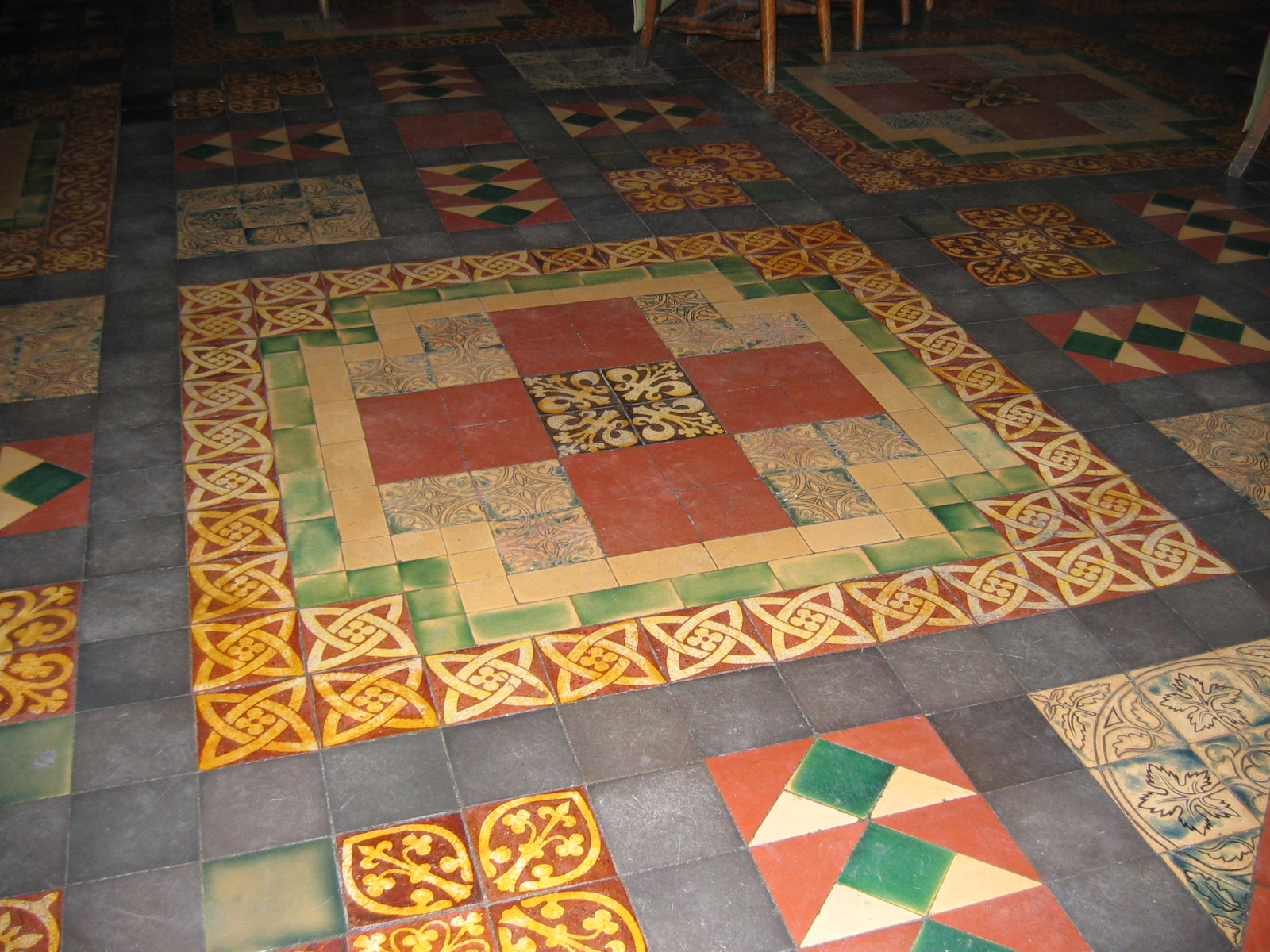
Floor of the cathedral

The cathedral is headed by the dean and governed by the entire chapter, originally 13 in number and having been as many as 30, now numbering up to 28, whose foundation and members' rights derive from the charter of 1191 as approved by Pope Celestine in 1192.

According to the Constitution of the Church of Ireland, the dean is the "immediate ordinary of the cathedral for the purpose of directing the clergy and official and ordering the services". However, "All other matters relating to the cathedral and not otherwise provided for shall be determined in chapter." The members of the chapter, which today represents in part the whole Church of Ireland, hold one of four dignities or special offices, or one of 24 prebends (22 regular, 2 ecumenical as noted below). One prebend is reserved for the Archbishop of Dublin, an unusual arrangement which is only actively used for elections of the dean.

Of the 13 original prebends, several were later reallocated, new ones created to replace them, and later, yet further prebends were designated. For many years, the chapter comprised the four dignities, the archdeacons of Dublin and Glendalough and 24 prebendaries, but the archdeacons ceased to be members based on those offices in the late 19th century.

=== Cathedral group of parishes (1970 to 2012) ===
As part of a reorganisation of city-based parishes (many with long histories), several were attached to each of the Dublin cathedrals. The Saint Patrick's Cathedral Group of Parishes which dated as a group from 1970 ceased to exist on the retirement of Dean Robert MacCarthy on 25 January 2012.

A new parish, called the Parish of St Catherine and St James with St Audoen, was created by an act of the General Synod of the Church of Ireland. This new parish is made up of each of the parishes of St Peter, St Matthias and St Audoen; St Catherine and St James; and St Luke and St Kevin. The rector is the Revd Canon M. D. Gardner, Prebendary of Maynooth.

=== Current offices ===
- Dean: from 1220 to 2007, the dean held the prebend of Clondalkin (a prebend since 1191), and churches at Kilberry, Clonwanwyr (Cloney) and Clonardmacgory (Tullaghgory), all later in the Parish of Kilberry. In 1228, the Church of Tallaght was attached to the Deanery. The current dean is the Very Revd William Morton, one time Dean of St Columb's Cathedral, Derry.
- Precentor: the precentor was given the prebend of a portion of Lusk in 1191, and in 1218 the churches of St Andrew in Dublin and Ardree. After several changes, a portion of Lusk was left. The current precentor is the Revd Peter Campion.
- Chancellor: from 1218 to 2007, the chancellor held the prebend of Finglas (from the 1191 charter) and the churches of St Martin's (Dublin) and Killachegar, though the latter ceased by 1280. By 1280, St Martin's also no longer provided revenue but St Werburgh's replaced it. The current chancellor is the Very Revd Niall Sloane.
- Treasurer: this office originally held the church of Clonkene and the prebend of St Audoen's (Dublin), as well as the rectory of St Mary's near Dublin Castle. Ballymore-Eustace later replaced Clonkene, and part of Lusk, St Audoen's. The current treasurer is A.H.N. McKinley.
- Taney: this prebend, relating to an ancient rural diocese, originated with the 1191 charter, was given to the Archdeacon of Dublin about 1275 and became independent in 1883 when the office of Archdeacon of Dublin ceased to hold a place in the chapter. The current Prebendary of Taney is the Venerable R. W. Carney, Archdeacon of Killaloe and Clonfert.
- Newcastle, County Dublin: this is a prebend since at least 1227 and was held by the Archdeacon of Glendalough from 1467 to 1872, when that archdeacon ceased to be a member of the chapter. The current Prebendary of Newcastle is the Revd I. M. Ellis, Rector of Newcastle (Dromore).
- Kilmactalway: this was made a prebend circa 1366 and was attached to the office of precentor for a time before becoming independent in 1467. The current Prebendary of Kilmactalway is The Revd J.C McWhirter.
- Swords: Swords has been a prebend since the original charter of 1191. As at September 2011, the Prebendary of Swords is the Very Revd G. J. O. Dunstan, Dean of Armagh.
- Yagoe: this has been a prebend since 1191, and was for over 600 years in the patronage of senior Irish aristocrats. The Prebendary of Yagoe at September 2011 is the Revd T. S. Forster (Armagh).
- St Audoen: after over 200 years as an adjunct to the Treasury, this became an independent prebend in 1467. The Prebendary of St Audoen as at September 2011 is the Revd David Oxley. Rector of Santry, Glasnevin and Finglas.
- Clonmethan: Clonmethan has been a prebend since the 1191 foundation. At July 2007, the Prebendary of Clonmethan is the Revd P. K. McDowell, Rector of Ballywillan (Connor).
- Wicklow: attached to the Archdiaconate of Glendalough from the early 14th century to 1467, this has since been independent. Prebendary of Wicklow as at September 2011 is the Revd S. E. Doogan, Incumbent of Ballyholme (Down).
- Tymothan: a manor estate, rather than a church, was attached to the Archbishopric until 1247, and has since been independent, though until Disestablishment, often vacant. As of September 2014, the Prebendary of Tymothan is Canon Paul Willoughby, Rector of the Kilmocomoge Union of Parishes (Cork).
- Mulhuddart: Mulhuddart has a history intertwined with the prebend of Castleknock, the two having been designated from at least 1230. The Venerable C.W.L. McCauley, Archdeacon of Kilmore, is Prebendary of Mulhuddart.
- Castleknock: with a history intertwined with the prebend of Mulhuddart, this has been designated since at least 1230. As at December 2015, the Prebendary of Castleknock is the Revd Canon P.I. Arbuthnot, Dean of Residence at the University of Dublin (Dublin).
- Tipper: this has been a prebend since at least 1227. Prebendary of Tipper as at September 2011 is the Revd J. D. M. Clarke, Rector of Navan (Meath).
- Tassagard: this has been a prebend since at least 1227. The Prebendary of Tassagard is the Revd S McVeigh, M.B.E.
- Dunlavin: this has been a prebend since no later than 1227. The Prebendary of Dunlavin is The Revd G. V. Wharton.
- Maynooth: a prebend since 1248, the right of presentation was long held by a layperson. Prebendary of Maynooth as at September 2011 is the Revd M. D. Gardner, Rector of St Catherine and St James with St Audoen (Dublin).
- Howth: Howth was one of the founding prebends, and at any early stage, the Archbishops removed the prebendal church from Ireland's Eye to Howth village. The Prebendary of Howth as of January 2018 is Revd. Canon David Crooks.
- Rathmichael: this has been a prebend since 1227 at the latest. At July 2013, Prebendary of Rathmichael is the Revd C. W. Mullen, dean's vicar.
- Monmohenock: originally part of the "Economy Estate" which supported cathedral operations, this became a lay-appointed prebend but was a regular prebend by circa 1227. The Prebendary of Monmohenock is the Revd T. C. Kinehan, Rector of Helen's Bay (Down).
- Tipperkevin: Tipperkevin actually comprised two prebendaries from the early 14th century to circa 1600, lying in the remote parts of County Dublin later separate from the main county, between Kildare and Wicklow. As at September 2011, the Prebendary of Tipperkevin is the Revd R. Warren, Rector of Taney Parish (Dublin).
- Donaghmore: this was a prebend from at least 1267. The Prebendary of Donaghmore as at September 2011 is The Revd I.W. Ellis.
- Stagonil: named as a prebend in the Papal Bull of Celestine III, this does not seem to have functioned independently until 1303. The Prebendary of Stagonil as at December 2015 is the Revd P.A. Harvey, Rector of Abbeyleix (Leighlin).
- Cualaun: after the impedance of the Prebend of Tymothan, and following a gap, from 1317, this prebend without a church provided a seat for the Archbishop of Dublin at the Chapter, used only at the election of a dean. The Prebendary of Cualan as at September 2011 is the Archbishop of Dublin, the Most Revd M. G. St A. Jackson.
- Clondalkin: transferred from the dean in 2007, as one of two newly authorised posts of ecumenical canon, this is now held by the Rev. Brian McKay, O.Carm., Prior of Terenure College, and formerly held by the Revd Heather Morris, President of the Methodist Church in Ireland
- Finglas: transferred from the chancellor in 2007, as one of two newly authorised posts of ecumenical canon, this is now held by The Revd C. McMullen.

All above roles as at July 2020.

=== Ecumenical canons ===
As noted above, in late June and early July 2007, Saint Patrick's appointed two ecumenical canons, one Presbyterian and one Roman Catholic, who can be invited by the dean to say Morning or Evening Prayer in the cathedral, read holy scripture and assist at baptisms, marriages, funerals or celebration of Holy Communion as well as participating in the meetings and decisions of the chapter.

- Roman Catholic: Rev. Prof. Enda McDonagh (2007–2012), Rev. Dr. Kieran O'Mahony OSA (2012–2017), Rev. Brian Mckay O.Carm. (2017–)
- Presbyterian: Rev. Dr. Ken Newell (2007–2012), Rev. Dr. Heather Morris (2012–2017)

== Notable features ==
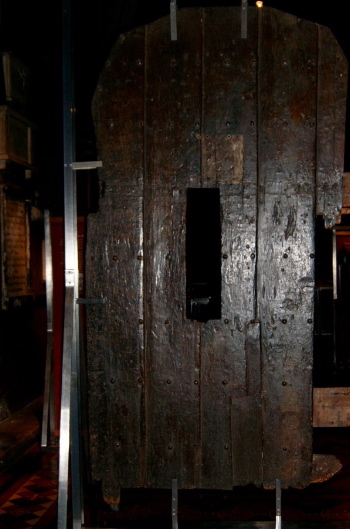
The Door of Reconciliation, through a hole in which the earls of Kildare and Ormond shook hands in 1492.

The cathedral, which generally receives no State funding, welcomes all, with a chapel for those who come simply to pray and a small fee for those who wish to sight-see. The cathedral website mentioned in 2006 that visitor numbers had reached around 300,000 a year.

Legend has it that Saint Patrick's was the place where the expression "chancing your arm" (meaning to take a risk) originated, when The 8th Earl of Kildare cut a hole in a door there, still to be seen, and thrust his arm through it to shake hands in friendship, in an effort to call a truce in the Butler–FitzGerald dispute with James, Earl of Ormond, in 1492.

It was outside St Patrick's that the troops of the Jacob's Garrison assembled after the Easter Rising to march to Richmond Barracks, where their leader Thomas MacDonagh and his sub-officers John MacBride and Michael O'Hanrahan were condemned to death and moved to Kilmainham Gaol to be shot.

=== Burials ===
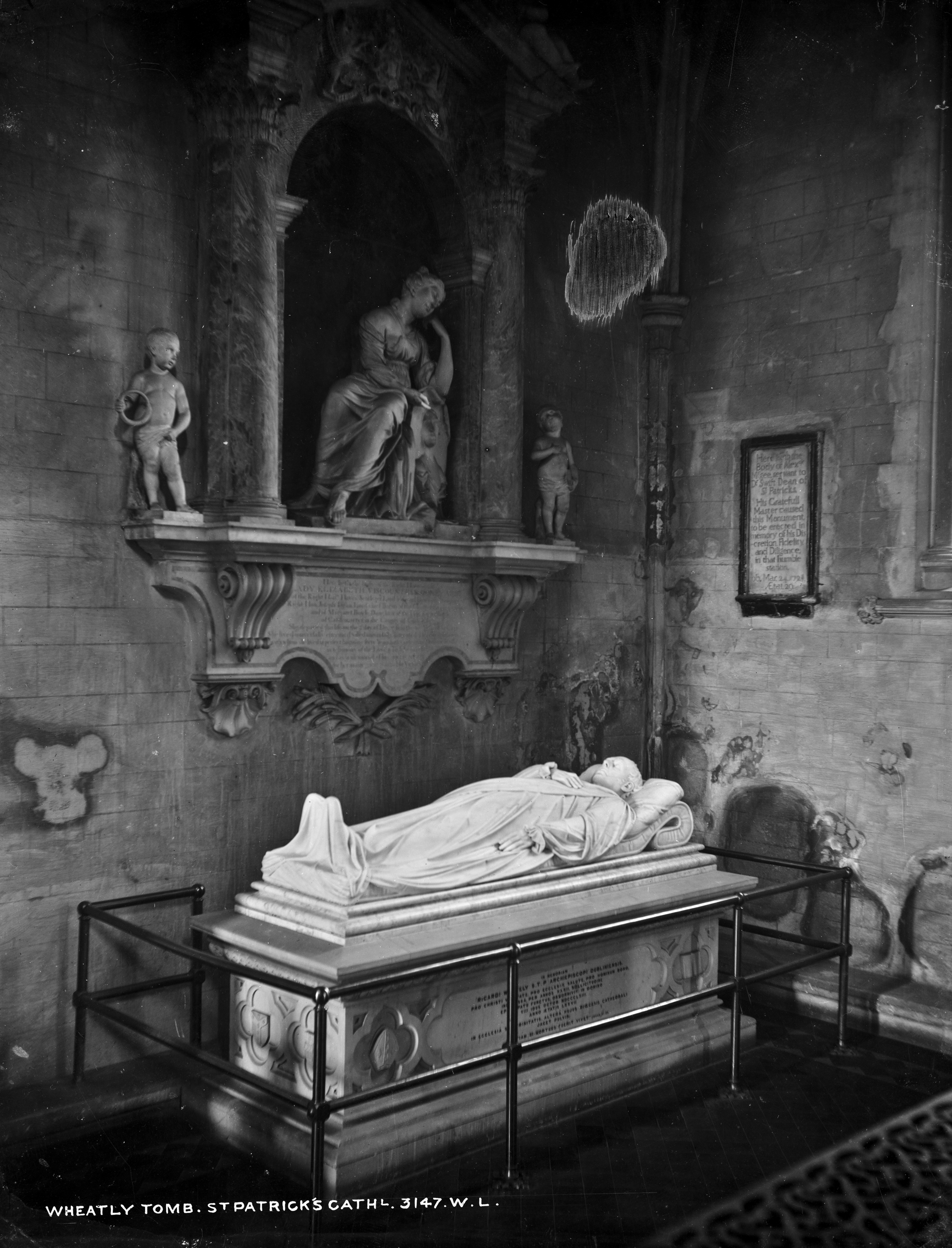
The Wheatly Tomb, St. Patricks Cathedral, Dublin

Over 500 people are buried on the site, both under the cathedral's floor and in the graveyard outside. Some notable individuals include:

- Sir Jerome Alexander (died 1670), a notoriously severe judge
- Marcus Beresford
- Sir John Blennerhassett and his wife
- Michael Boyle
- John Cradock, Church of Ireland Archbishop of Dublin (1772–1778)
- Thomas Cromwell, 3rd Earl of Ardglass
- John de Sandford, Catholic Archbishop of Dublin and his brother Fulk Basset
- Hugh Inge, Catholic Archbishop of Dublin
- Thomas Jones as well as his wife
- Adam Loftus, also the first provost of Trinity College Dublin – in a family vault also containing his wife and two of their children
- Richard Meredith
- Richard Northalis, Catholic Archbishop of Dublin
- Lennox Robinson, playwright and director
- Frederick Schomberg, 1st Duke of Schomberg (1615/6–1690)
- Jonathan Swift, author and dean of the cathedral and Esther Johnson ("Stella") his companion of many years.
- Richard Talbot, Archbishop of Dublin
- James Henthorn Todd (1805–1869), historian, treasurer, precentor.
- Michael Tregury, Archbishop of Dublin (1450–1471)

=== Choir school and grammar school ===
The choir school continues and although originally all-male, now also admits girls; a Cathedral Girls' Choir was founded in 2000 and sings once or twice a week. The girls are mostly drawn from either the choir school or St Patrick's Grammar School, which provides secondary education. It is no longer compulsory for grammar school pupils to be in the choirs, although many of the girls are, and a few boys; many of the boys leave when their voice breaks. Choirboys are considered professional singers and are paid monthly for their services. The girls are not. The choir also sings very occasionally at weddings and receives payment for this. Until 1998 they received a large discount on their education; they are still offered free music lessons. While non-choirboy students had two months' holidays during the summer, half of the boys were on duty every day during the summer and had to attend choir practice and two services each weekday, one service on Saturday and two on Sunday. This arrangement was also changed in 1998.

=== Organ ===
The organ of St Patrick's Cathedral is one of the largest in Ireland with over 4,000 pipes. Parts of it date from a Renatus Harris instrument of 1695. The organ was rebuilt in the 1890s by Henry Willis and Son, in consultation with Sir George Martin. It was restored in 1963 by J. W. Walker & Sons Ltd.

List of organists

- 1509 William Herbit
- 1555 William Browne
- 1606 Anthony Willis
- 1631 Randal Jewett
- 1661 John Hawkshaw
- 1686 Thomas Godfrey
- 1689 Thomas Finell
- 1691 William Isaac
- 1695 Robert Hodge
- 1698 Daniel Roseingrave
- 1727 Ralph Roseingrave
- 1748 Richard Broadway
- 1761 George Walsh
- 1765 Henry Walsh
- 1769 Michael Sandys
- 1773 Samuel Murphy
- 1780 Philip Cogan
- 1806 John Mathews
- 1827 William Warren
- 1828 Francis Robinson
- 1830 John Robinson
- 1844 Richard Cherry
- 1845 William Henry White
- 1852 Sir Robert P. Stewart
- 1861 William Murphy
- 1879 Charles George Marchant
- 1920 George H P Hewson
- 1960 William Sydney Grieg
- 1977 John Dexter
- 2002 Peter Barley
- 2010 Stuart Nicholson

=== Bells ===
St. Patrick's Cathedral holds the heaviest change-ringing peal of bells in Ireland, which are also the tenth heaviest in the world. They consist of a 12-bell diatonic peal (tenor: 0 long tons 45 cwt 1 qr 18 lb (5,086 lb or 2.307 t))and three semitone bells, with the main peal being tuned to the key of C.

In 1670 there was a ring of eight bells made by Thomas Purdue. During the Guinness restoration, a new peal of bells was presented by Benjamin Lee Guinness. In the 1890s his son, Edward Guinness, donated a new peal of bells (a peal of 10 plus a flat 4th) cast by John Taylor and Co in 1897. They were augmented with two trebles presented by Richard Cherry, the Attorney-General for Ireland (himself a prolific bellringer) in 1909, to produce Ireland's first ring of twelve bells. The first peal rung on the bells, in 1911, was the first tower bell peal ever rung outside of England. A sharp-second bell was added in 2007 in order to create a light peal of eight, and this was also cast by John Taylor & Co.

The bells are rung regularly on Sundays for Sung Eucharist and Choral Evensong, and ringing practices are held on Tuesday nights. A learners practice is also held on Saturday mornings.

An Ellacombe apparatus is installed in the ringing room, however this is no longer functional.

=== Friends of the cathedral ===
The cathedral is supported by a volunteer organisation, with both subscribing (annual and five-year) and life members, who perform various tasks and contribute materially to the work and fabric of the cathedral. In addition, there is a range of voluntary groups performing specific tasks, such as bell-ringing, welcoming of guests and cleaning.

== Notable people ==
- June Rodgers (b. 1959), Irish comedian, was confirmed at the cathedral

== See also ==
- Dean of St Patrick's Cathedral, Dublin
