= Turnerelli =

Turnerelli is a surname. Notable people with the surname include:

- Edward Tracy Turnerelli (1813–1896), British artist
- Peter Turnerelli (c. 1772–1839), Irish-born sculptor of Italian descent
