= Dublin Cathedral =

Dublin Cathedral may refer to:

- St Mary's Cathedral, the Roman Catholic cathedral of the Archdiocese of Dublin
- Christ Church Cathedral, Dublin, the Church of Ireland cathedral of the Diocese of Dublin
- St Patrick's Cathedral, Dublin, the Church of Ireland national cathedral in Dublin, Ireland
