= John Troy (bishop) =

Irish Dominican and Roman Catholic Archbishop of Dublin

The Most Reverend John Thomas Troy O.P.
- Archbishop of Dublin; Primate of Ireland
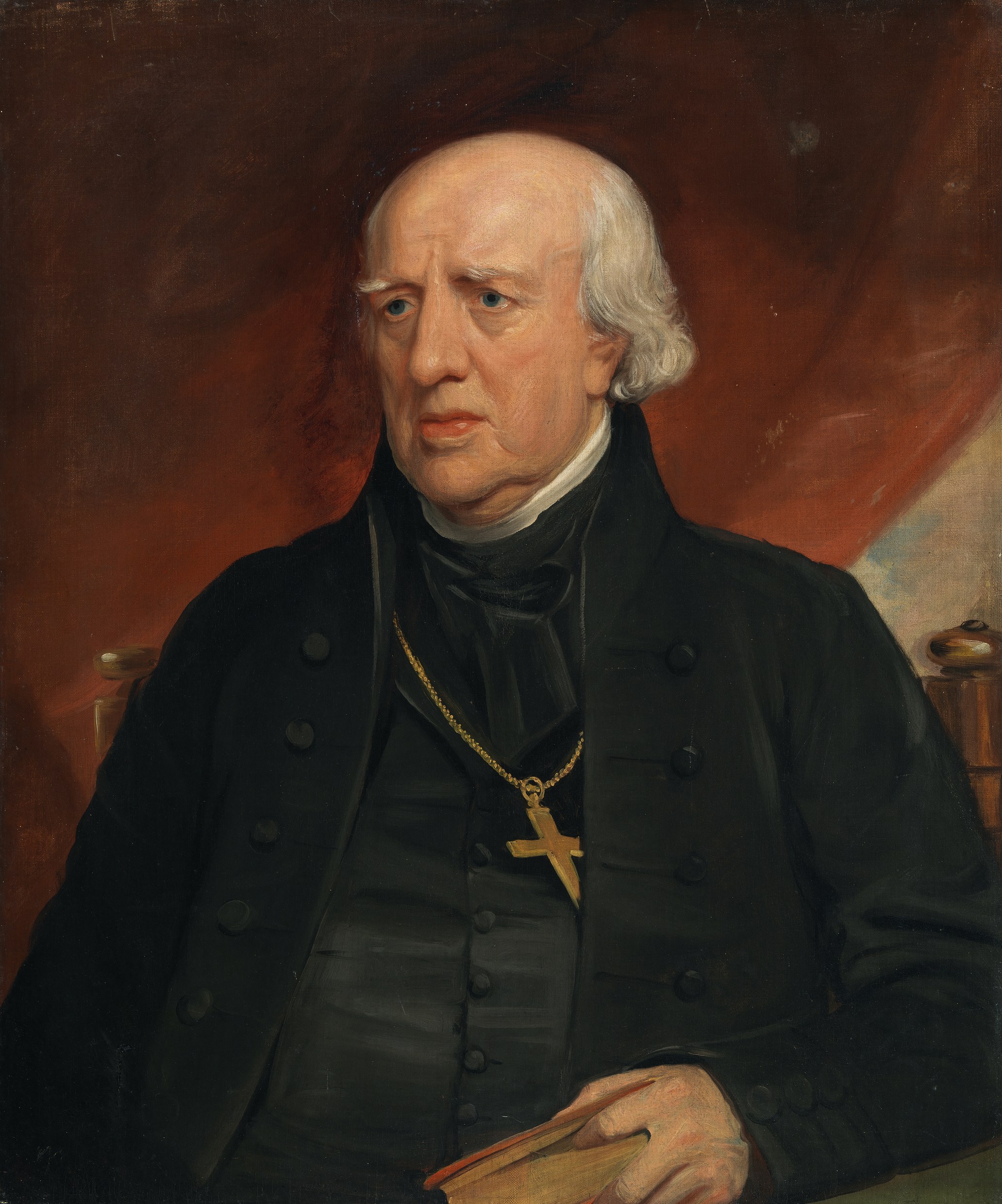
- Portrait by Thomas Clement Thompson
- Church: Roman Catholic
- Archdiocese: Dublin
- In office: 1786–1823
- Predecessor: John Carpenter
- Successor: Daniel Murray
- Previous posts: Rector/Prior of San Clemente al Laterano (1772–76); Bishop of Ossory (1777–86)

Orders
- Ordination: 17 April 1757
- Consecration: 8 June 1777 by Ignazio Busca

Personal details
- Born: 10 May 1739 near Porterstown, Dublin, Ireland
- Died: 11 May 1823 (aged 84) Dublin, Ireland

John Thomas Troy, OP (10 May 1739 – 11 May 1823) was an Irish Dominican friar who served as Archbishop of Dublin from 1786 to 1823.

== Life ==
=== Dominican ===
Of Anglo-Norman stock, Troy was born at Annefield House, near Porterstown, County Dublin, and received his early education at Liffey Street, Dublin. At the age of sixteen he joined the Dominican Order and proceeded to their house of St. Clement at Rome. Historian Edward D'Alton notes that he was "amenable to discipline, diligent in his studies, and talented". He made rapid progress, and while still a student was appointed to give lectures in philosophy. Subsequently, he taught theology and canon law, and finally became prior/rector of the convent in 1772.

=== Bishop of Ossory ===
When the Bishop of Ossory died, in 1776, the priests of the diocese recommended one of their number, Father Molloy, to Rome for the vacant see, and the recommendation was endorsed by many of the Irish bishops. But Troy, who was held in high esteem at Rome, had already been appointed Bishop of Ossory. He was consecrated at Louvain in June 1777 by the nuncio to Flanders, Archbishop (later Cardinal) Ignazio Busca.

Troy arrived at Kilkenny in August 1777 and for the next nine years he laboured hard for the spiritual interests of his diocese. Maddened by excessive rents and tithes, and harried by grinding tithe-proctors, farmers had banded themselves together in a secret society called the "Whiteboys", so called from the white smocks the members wore in their nightly raids. They attacked landlords, bailiffs, agents, and tithe-proctors, and often committed fearful outrages. Bishop Troy frequently and sternly denounced them, declaring any who joined the secret society to be excommunicated. Troy had no sympathy with oppression, but he had lived long in Rome, and did not fully appreciate the extent of misery in which the poor Catholic masses lived.

He was ready to condemn all violent efforts for reform, and had no hesitation in denouncing not only all secret societies in Ireland, but also "our American fellow-subjects, seduced by specious notions of liberty". This made him unpopular. He was zealous in correcting abuses in his diocese and in promoting education. So well was this recognized at Rome that in 1781, in consequence of some serious troubles which had arisen between the primate and his clergy, Troy was appointed Administrator of Armagh. This office he held till 1782.

=== Archbishop of Dublin ===
Upon the death of Archbishop John Carpenter of Dublin) in 1786, Troy was appointed to succeed him. At Dublin, as at Ossory, he showed his zeal for religion, his sympathy with authority, and his distrust of popular movements, especially when violent means were employed. Though his circular, issued on 15 March 1792, disavowing the authority of any ecclesiastical power to absolve subjects from their allegiance, is believed to have influenced the concession in that year of the relaxations embodied in Langrishe's Act, and the extension of the franchise to Roman Catholics in 1793, he declined to associate himself with John Keogh and other Catholic reformers in their demands for further relief.

In early 1798 the French Directory conquered Rome, and established the Roman Republic. Its ally in Ireland, the Society of United Irishmen, started a rebellion in May 1798. Troy issued a sentence of excommunication against all those of his flock who would join the rebellion. In a pastoral read in all the churches, he spoke of the clerical organisers of the rebellion as "vile prevaricators and apostates from religion, loyalty, honour, and decorum, degrading their sacred character, and the most criminal and detestable of rebellious and seditious culprits". Troy's action at this time appears to have endangered his life. But the influence he had acquired with the government enabled him to moderate the repressive measures taken by the authorities. Believing that Catholic emancipation could never be conceded by the Irish parliament, he was one of the most determined supporters of the Union.

In 1799, he agreed to accept the veto of government on the appointment of bishops in Ireland, and even when the other bishops, feeling they had been tricked by Pitt and Castlereagh, repudiated the veto, Troy continued to favour it. However, in 1809, he recommended Daniel Murray be appointed his coadjutor. Murray was an uncompromising opponent of the "veto", and while Troy's co-adjutor, made trips in 1814 and 1815 to Rome concerning the controversy.

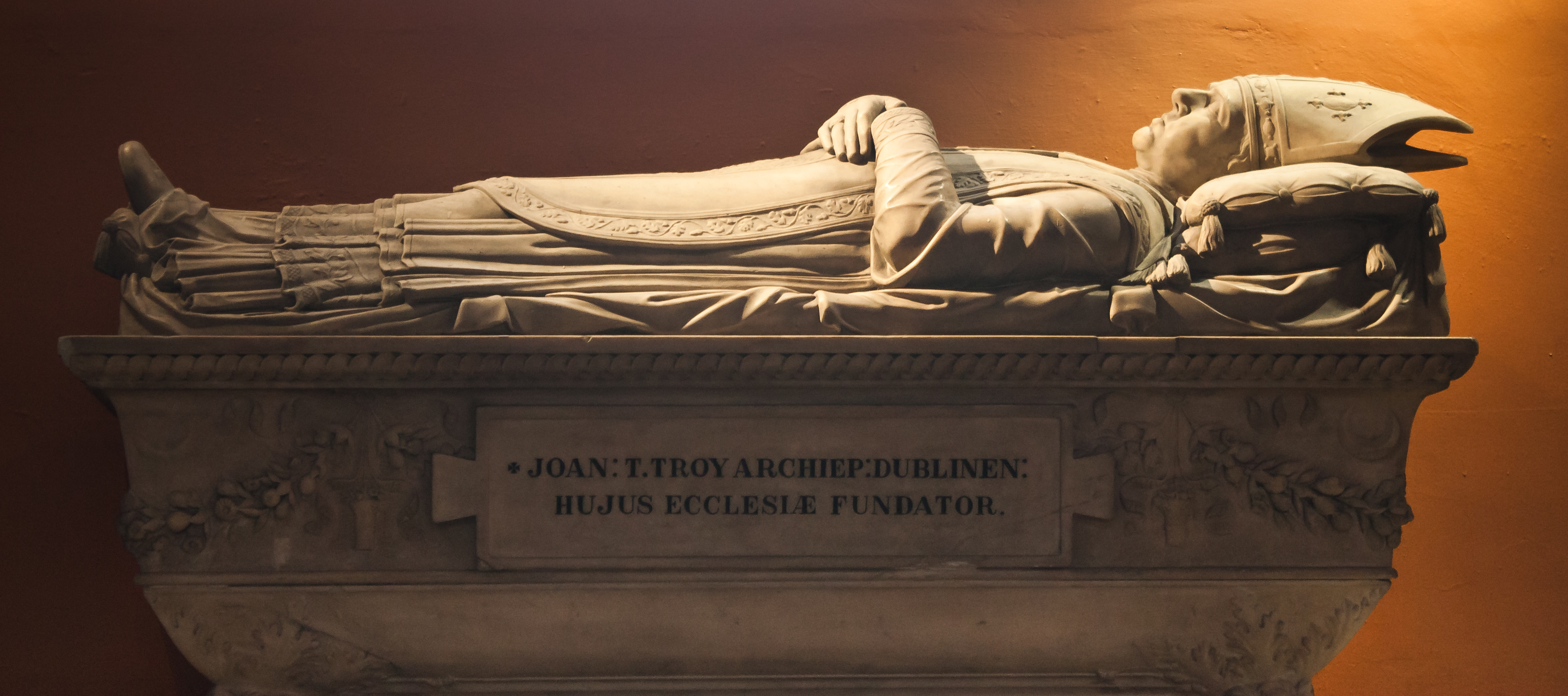
Recumbent effigy of John Troy in the north aisle of St Mary's Pro-Cathedral, sculpted by Peter Turnerelli in 1823

In April 1815, Archbishop Troy laid the foundation of St Mary's Pro-Cathedral in Marlborough Street, Dublin, but did not live to see it completed. Archbishop Troy died on 11 May 1823 at the age of eighty-four. He died in Dublin very poor, leaving scarce sufficient to pay for his burial, and was interred in the unfinished St Mary's Pro-Cathedral.

In the administration of his diocese and in his private life, Troy was eminently zealous, pious, and charitable. Although his cordial relations with the government exposed him to many suspicions and accusations, there is no ground for questioning the integrity of his motives and conduct, which were inspired by his views of the interest of his church. His distrust of revolutionary tendencies in civil affairs was fully aligned with the policy of the Vatican throughout his career. John D'Alton, speaks of Troy as "a truly learned and zealous pastor, ... a lover and promoter of the most pure Christian morality, vigilant in the discharge of his duty, and devotedly solicitous not only for the spiritual good of those consigned to his charge, but also for the public quiet of the state".

Catholic Church titles
Preceded by John Carpenter	Archbishop of Dublin; 1786–1823	Succeeded by Daniel Murray

== See also ==
- Dominicans in Ireland

== Sources ==
- D'Alton, History of the Archbishops of Dublin (Dublin, 1838)
- McNally, Vincent J., Reform, Revolution and Reaction: Archbishop John Thomas Troy and the Catholic Church in Ireland 1787-1817. London: University Press of America, 1995, p. 10
