= Daniel Murray (bishop) =

Irish archbishop (1768–1852)

The Most Reverend Daniel Murray
- Archbishop of Dublin; Primate of Ireland
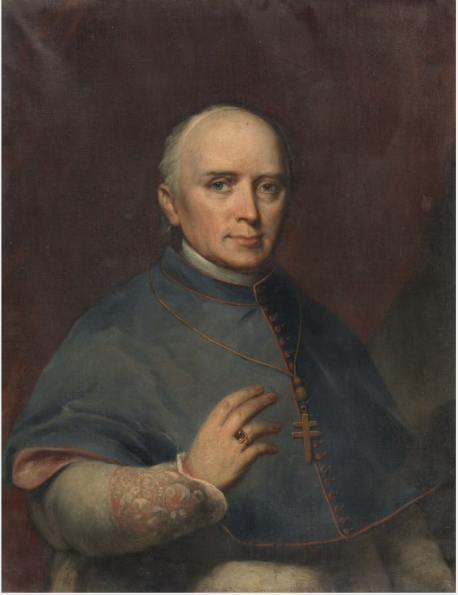
- Church: Roman Catholic
- Archdiocese: Dublin
- In office: 1823–1852
- Predecessor: John Troy
- Successor: Paul Cullen
- Previous posts: Coadjutor Archbishop of Dublin and Titular Archbishop of Hieropolis in Phrygia (1809–23)

Orders
- Ordination: 1790
- Consecration: 30 November 1809 by John Troy

Personal details
- Born: 18 April 1768 Arklow, Ireland
- Died: 26 February 1852 (aged 83)
- Education: Irish College, Salamanca

Daniel Murray (1768, at Sheepwalk, near Arklow, Ireland – Dublin, 1852) was an Irish Catholic prelate who served as Archbishop of Dublin from 1832 until his death.

== Life ==
He was born on 18 April 1768 at Sheepwalk, near Arklow, County Wicklow, the son of Thomas and Judith Murray. His parents were farmers. At the age of eight he went to Thomas Betagh's school at Saul's Court, near Christchurch Cathedral. At sixteen, Archbishop John Carpenter sent him to the Irish College at Salamanca, completing his studies at the University of Salamanca. He was ordained priest in 1792 at the age of twenty-four.

After some years as curate at St. Paul's Church in Dublin he was transferred to Arklow, and was there in 1798 when the rebellion broke out. The yeomanry shot the parish priest in bed and Murray, to escape a similar fate, fled to the city where for two years he served as curate at St. Andrew's Chapel on Hawkins Street. As a preacher, Murray is said to have been particularly effective, especially in appeals for charitable causes, such as the schools. He was then assigned to the Chapel of St. Mary in Liffey Street Upper where Archbishop John Troy was the Parish Priest.

In 1809, at the request of Archbishop Troy, Murray was appointed coadjutor bishop, and consecrated on 30 November 1809. In 1811 he was made Administrator of St. Andrew's. That same year he helped Mary Aikenhead establish the Religious Sisters of Charity. While coadjutor he filled for one year the position of president of St Patrick's College, Maynooth.

Murray was an uncompromising opponent of a proposal granting the British government a "veto" over Catholic ecclesiastical appointments in Ireland, and in 1814 and 1815, made two separate trips to Rome concerning the controversy.

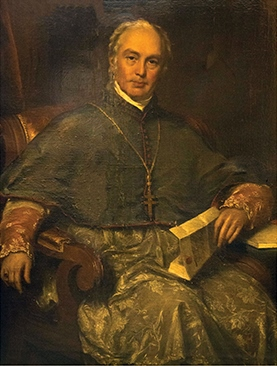
Daniel Murray, archbishop of Dublin

Murray became Archbishop of Dublin in 1825 and on 14 November 1825 celebrated the completion of St Mary's Pro-Cathedral. He enjoyed the confidence of successive popes and was held in high respect by the British government. His life was mainly devoted to ecclesiastical affairs, and the establishment and organisation of religious associations for the education and relief of the poor. With the outbreak of cholera in the 1830s, in 1834 he and Mother Aikenhead founded St. Vincent's Hospital. Murray persuaded Edmund Rice to send members of the Christian Brothers to Dublin to start a school for boys. The first was opened in a lumber yard on the City Quay. He assisted Catherine McAuley in founding the Sisters of Mercy, and in 1831 professed the first three members.

Edward Bouverie Pusey had an interview with him in 1841, and bore testimony to his moderation, and John Henry Newman had some correspondence with him prior to Newman's conversion from the Anglican Church to the Roman Catholic Church in 1845. A seat in the privy council at Dublin, officially offered to him in 1846, was not accepted. Murray took part in the synod of the Roman Catholic clergy at Thurles in 1850.

Towards the end of his life, Murray's eyesight was impaired, and he read and wrote with difficulty. Among his last priestly functions was a funeral service for Richard Lalor Sheil who had died in Italy, and whose body had been brought back to Ireland for burial. Daniel Murray died in Dublin on 26 February 1852, at the age of eighty-four. He was interred in the pro-cathedral, Dublin, where a marble statue of him has been erected in connection with a monument to his memory, executed by James Farrell, president of the Royal Hibernian Academy of Fine Arts.

== Views ==
He was a strong supporter of Daniel O'Connell's Catholic Association, and gave testimony before the Parliamentary Commission on Catholic emancipation, but remained aloof from the Repeal Association.

Murray was later a strong opponent of the Ecclesiastical Titles Act 1851. Because the Roman Catholic Relief Act 1829 had forbidden the use of the old titles except by the clergy of the established Protestant Church, the Catholic Church had refrained from using the ancient titles of the existing Anglican sees, and had created new titles for their bishoprics. In Ireland, the Catholic hierarchy continued to use the titles of the ancient sees. In 1850, in response to the Catholic emancipation legislation, Pope Pius IX set up a Roman Catholic hierarchy of dioceses in England and Wales in Universalis Ecclesiae. The Ecclesiastical Titles Act 1851 was passed in response, making it a criminal offence for anyone outside the Church of England to use any episcopal title "of any city, town or place, or of any territory or district (under any designation or description whatsoever), in the United Kingdom". The Roman Catholic community unofficially used the territorial titles, although the bishops themselves carefully stayed within the letter of the law. No one was ever prosecuted.

He supported Stanley's National Education scheme and among the first Education Commissioners, wished to tolerate the Queen's Colleges, as opposed to the views of Archbishop John MacHale of Tuam. He had hesitation, however, in accepting the adverse decision of Rome, and was present at the Synod of Thurles where the Queen's Colleges were formally condemned.

== Sources ==
- D'Alton, Archbishops of Dublin (Dublin, 1838)
- Healy, Centenary History of Maynooth College (Dublin, 1895)
- Meagher, Life of Archbishop Murray (Dublin, 1853)
- FitzPatrick, Life of Dr. Doyle (Dublin, 1880)
- O'Reilly, Life of Archbishop MacHale (New York, 1890)

Catholic Church titles
Preceded by John Troy	Archbishop of Dublin; 1823–1852	Succeeded by Paul Cullen
Academic offices
Preceded by Patrick Everard	President of St. Patrick's College, Maynooth; 1812–1813	Succeeded by Bartholomew Crotty
