= Henry Behnes =

British sculptor

Henry Behnes (c. 1800 – August 1837), later known as Henry B. Burlow, was a British sculptor.

== Life ==
Born in London, Behnes was the son of a Hanoverian pianoforte-maker and his English wife. He was the younger brother of William Behnes, also a sculptor. Both brothers were influenced in their choice of a profession by the same circumstance. Henry, being a much inferior artist, was honourably anxious to prevent confusion in the public mind, and took the name of Burlowe. The irregularities of William Behnes are considered to have added a strong incentive to this act of repudiation. Henry exhibited at the Academy in 1831–33. He afterwards went to Rome, and was much employed as a bust modeller. He died of cholera in that city in August 1837. According to an account in The Art Journal he was a person 'of sterling character and generous impulses, who sacrificed his life in devotion to those of his friends who had been seized with cholera.' Though 'every way superior to his brother as a man,' he was, says the same writer, 'his inferior as an artist' ... 'the difference in the instant apprehension of form and manipulative power in the two brothers was very remarkable. The composition of the one was hard, piecemeal, and disjointed, while the modelling of the other was rapid, certain, soft, and accurate.' Against this critique may be set the remark of Richard Redgrave: 'He was original in his art and of much promise.'

He died of cholera on 11 September 1837 during an epidemic in Italy while he was on a visit to Rome. He was buried in the Campo Cestio Cemetery at Monte Testaccio in Rome.

== Known works ==
- Grave of Thomas Houstoun in Carshalton (1828)
- Bust of George Clint RA (1831)
- Bust of John Pye (1831) now in the National Portrait Gallery, London
- Bust of Henry Graves (1831)
- Bust of Richard Hart Davies (1831)
- Tomb of Katherine Noel in Kirkby Mallory (1832)
- Bust of Sir James Mackintosh (1832)
- Bust of Samuel Carter Hall (1833) in Bethnal Green Museum
- Bust of Dr Lushington (1833)
- Bust of Sir Peter Hesketh-Fleetwood (1837)
