= St Mary's Cathedral, Dublin =

Coordinates: 53°21′3″N 6°15′33″W

St Mary's Cathedral
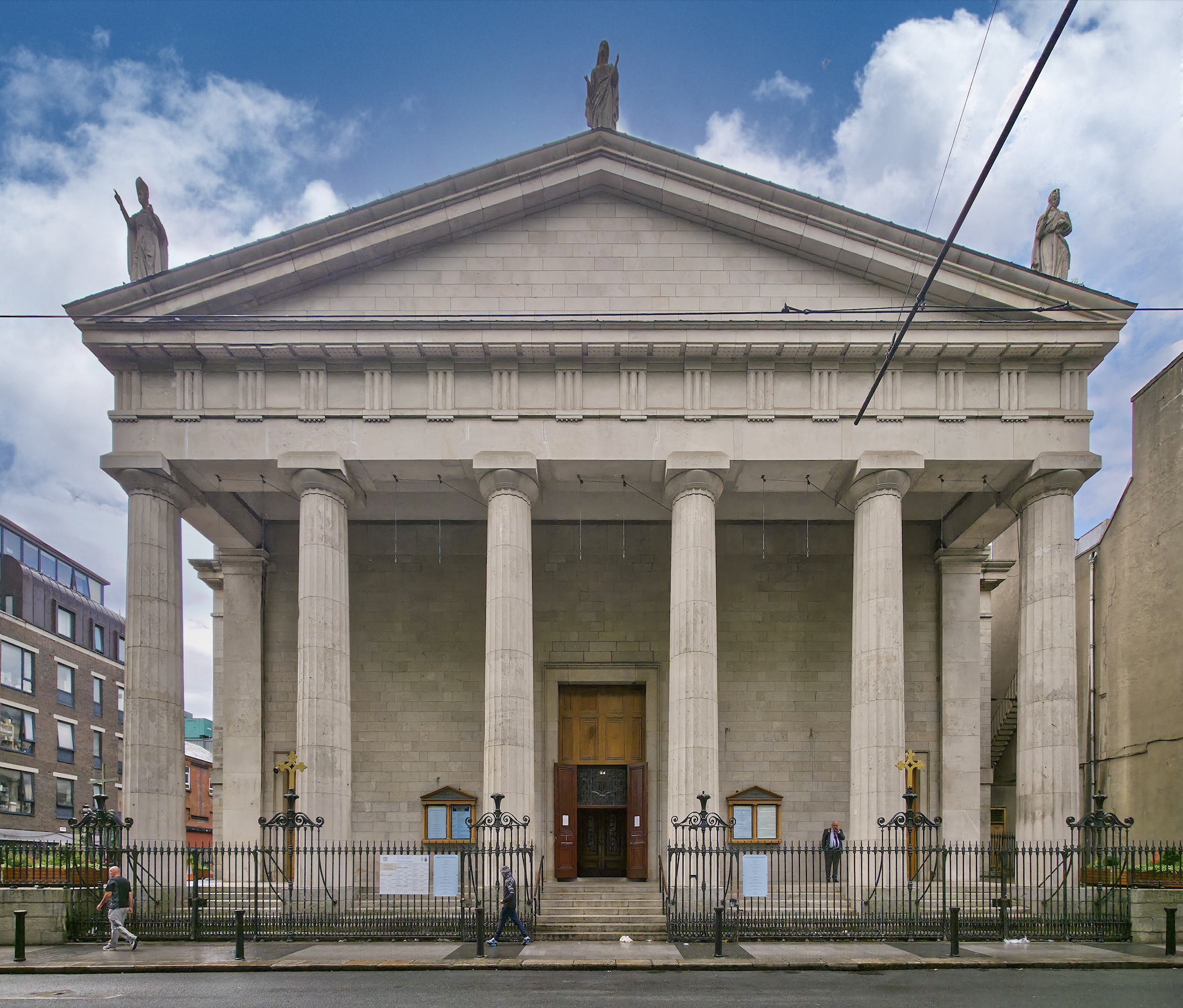
- St Mary's Cathedral from Marlborough Street

- Location within Central Dublin
- Location: 83 Marlborough Street, Dublin
- Country: Ireland
- Denomination: Roman Catholic
- Tradition: Latin
- Website: procathedral.ie

History
- Status: Active
- Dedication: Mary, mother of Jesus
- Dedicated: 14 November 1825
- Consecrated: 1825

Architecture
- Functional status: Cathedral
- Style: Neoclassical

Administration
- Province: Dublin
- Diocese: Dublin

Clergy
- Archbishop: Dermot Farrell

St Mary's Cathedral (Irish: Ardeaglais Naomh Muire), formerly known as St Mary's Pro-Cathedral, is a cathedral and is the episcopal seat of the Catholic Archbishop of Dublin and Primate of Ireland.

== Status ==
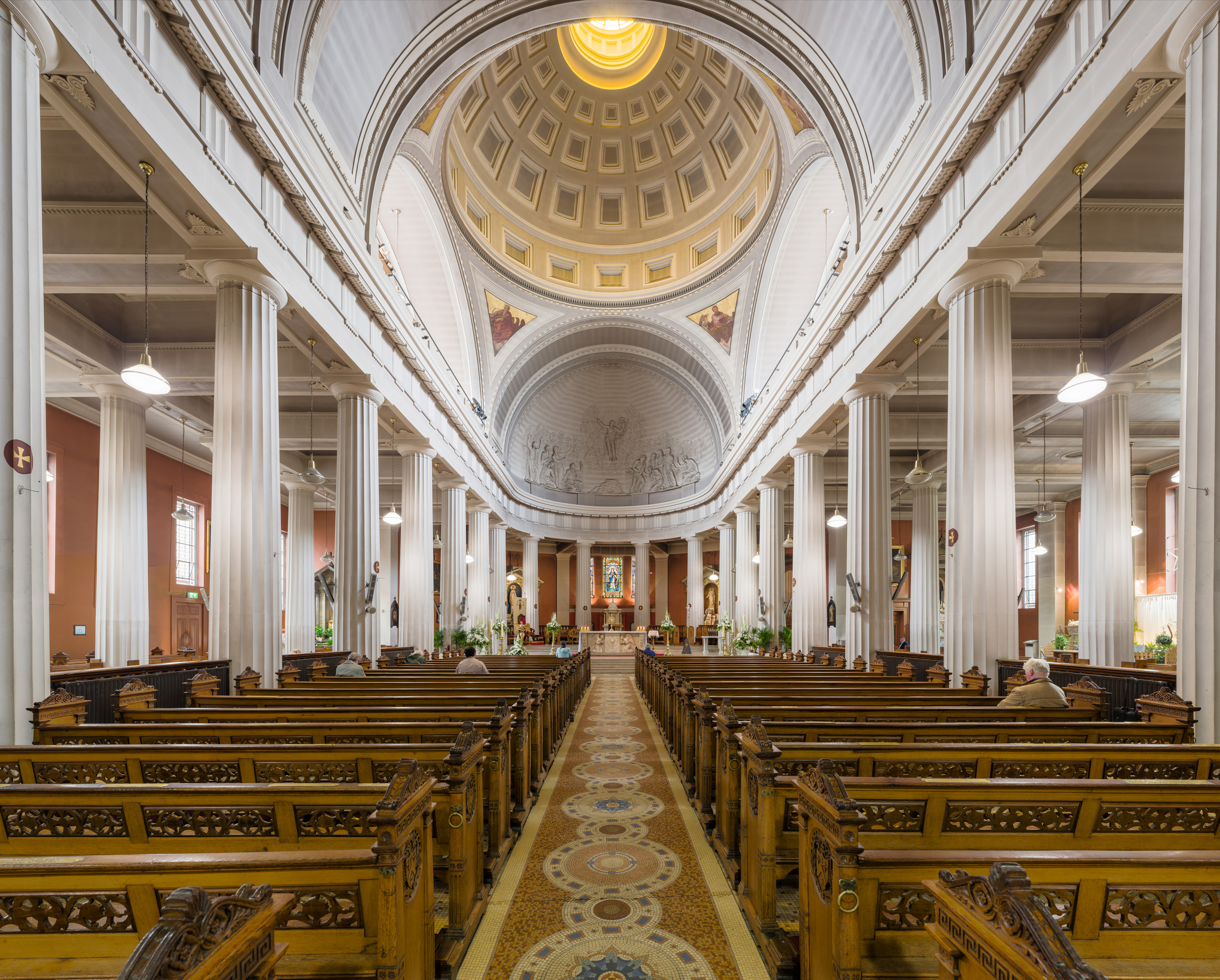
The view toward the Sanctuary from the nave

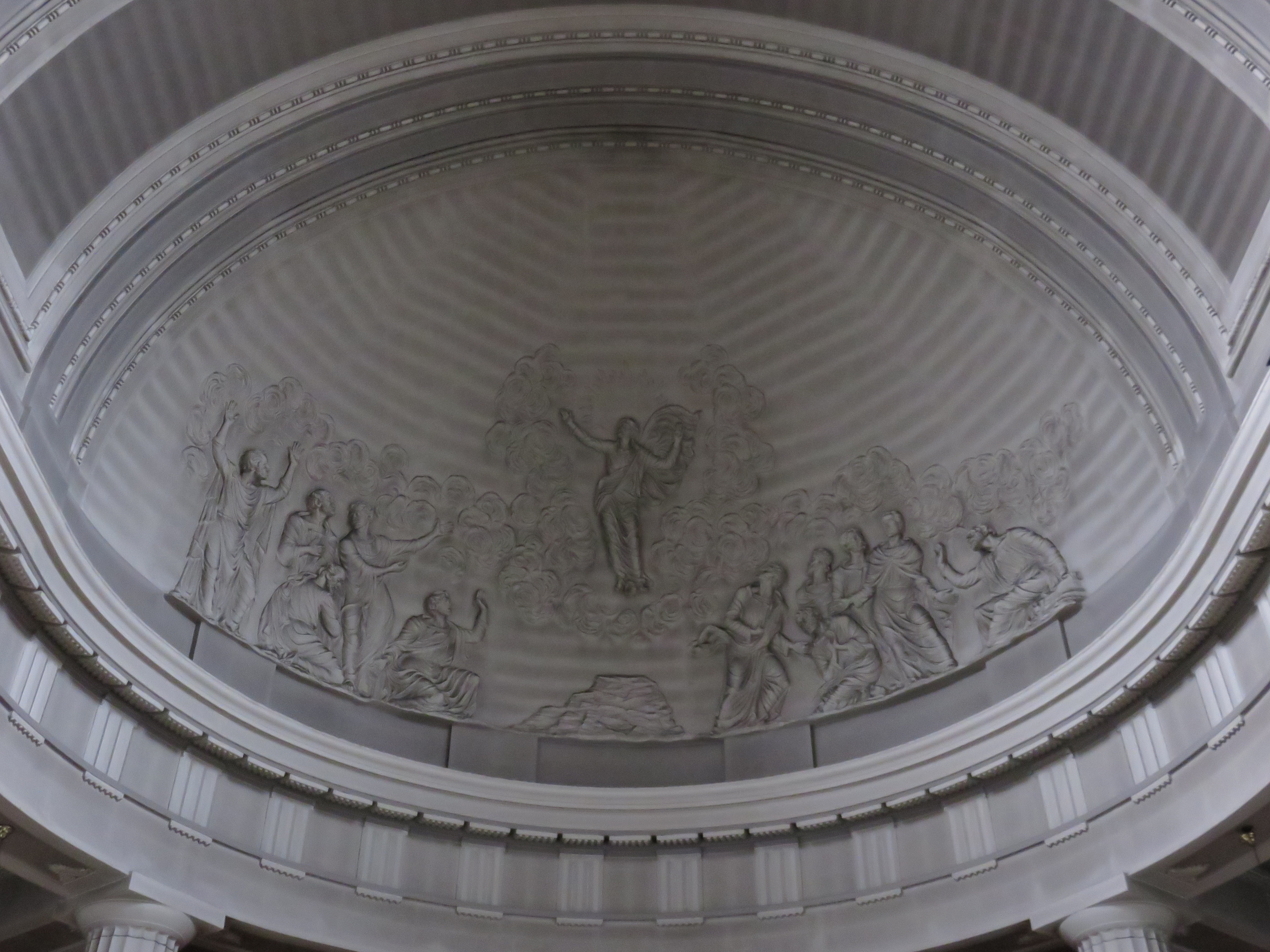
Detail of the apse

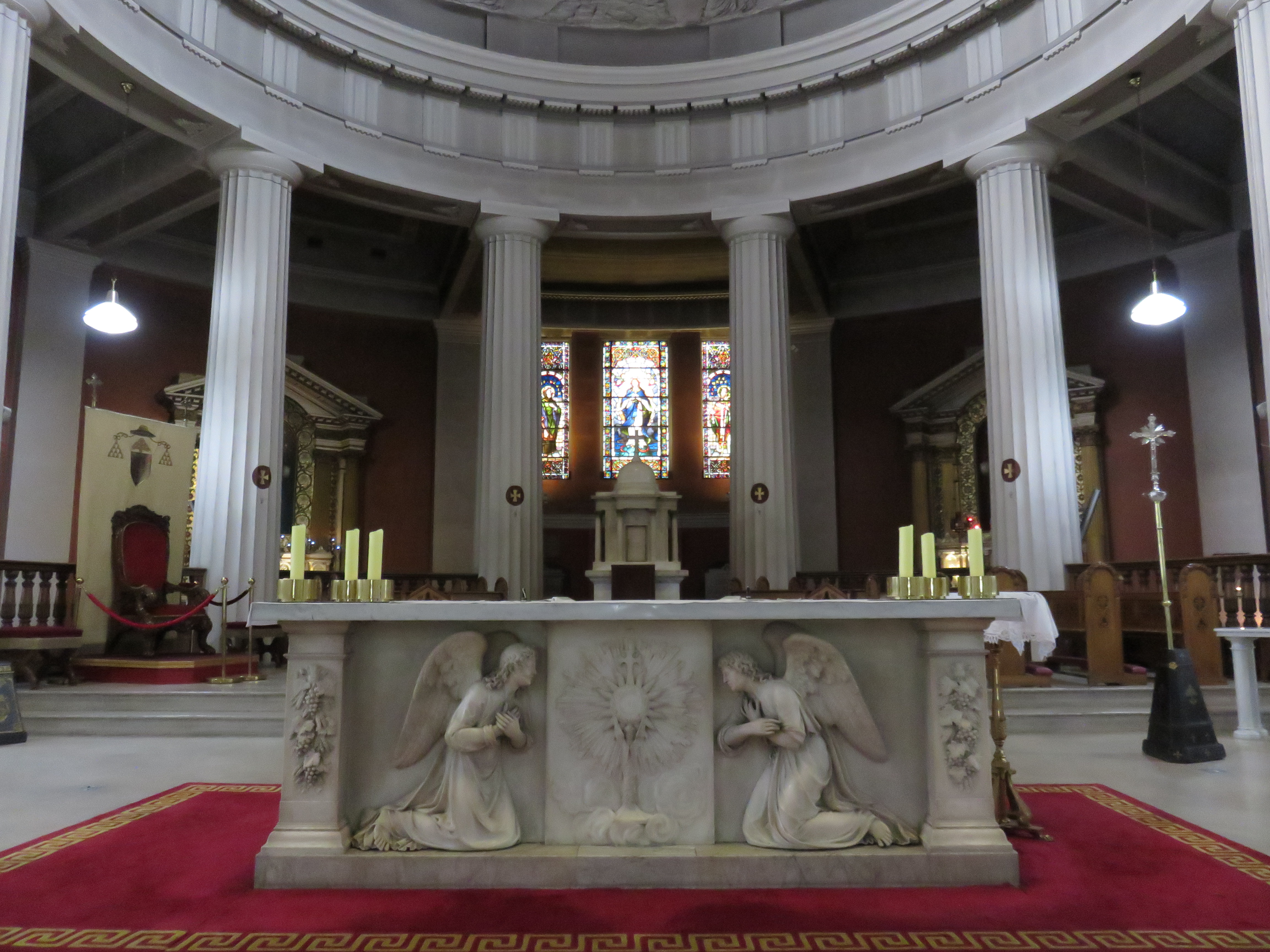
Altar

Up until November 2025, the city of Dublin held two cathedrals claimed by the Roman Catholic church, an unusual situation in itself. Further, both were controlled from the time of the Reformation by the minority Church of Ireland, which had been the Established Church in Ireland until 1871. In contrast, the majority religion in Ireland, Roman Catholicism, had no cathedral in Ireland's capital city. As the State church, the Church of Ireland was given control of all church property during the Reformation, including the Cathedral of the Holy Trinity (generally known as Christchurch) and St Patrick's Cathedral.

These two churches had long shared the role of cathedral of Dublin, controversially at first, then under an agreement of 1300, Pacis Compositio, which gave Christchurch formal precedence, including the right to enthrone the Archbishop and to hold his cross, mitre and ring after death, but with deceased Archbishops of Dublin to be buried alternately in each of the two cathedrals, unless they personally willed otherwise, and the two cathedrals to act as one, and "shared equally in their freedoms".

Even though Christchurch has been in the possession of the Church of Ireland for nearly five hundred years, it was still viewed by the Roman Catholic Church as the primary official Dublin cathedral, since it was so designated by the pope at the request of the then Archbishop of Dublin, St Laurence O'Toole in the 12th century. Until the pope granted cathedral status to St Mary's, it was designated a "pro-cathedral" (Note: Pro is short for Pro tempore, a Latin phrase meaning "temporary or provisional".) (meaning provisional or acting cathedral), a title officially given to St Mary's Church in 1886, though it had used that title unofficially since the 1820s.

In November 2025, Pope Leo XIV designated St Mary's as Dublin's official Catholic cathedral.

== History ==
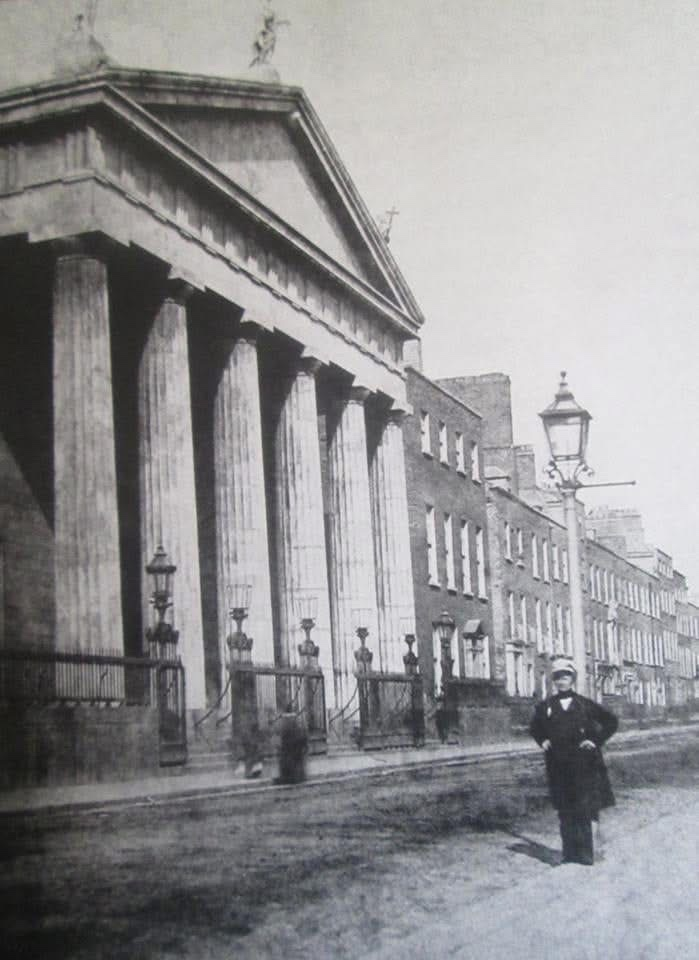
St Mary's Cathedral, Dublin in the 1850s

The cathedral owes its origins to the Penal Laws (Note: Though the Penal Laws were principally targeted at Roman Catholics, they were also used against many smaller Nonconformist denominations, such as the Presbyterian Church in Ireland. In theory, only members of the state church, the Church of Ireland, had full civil rights and were free from discrimination in everything from their religious worship to their right to own property.) which restricted Catholicism (and other non-Church of Ireland faiths) until the early nineteenth century. For centuries, Roman Catholics could not celebrate Mass or the sacraments in public and were subject to severe penalties (hence the word penal). While these laws ebbed and flowed in terms of the severity with which they were applied, Catholic churches if they were built at all, were built down narrow, difficult-to-find roadways. By the early nineteenth century, many of the Penal Laws had either been repealed or were no longer enforced; an unsuccessful attempt had already been made to grant Catholic Emancipation. As a result, Catholicism began to abandon its previous status as an "underground" religion.

In 1803, a committee formed by then Archbishop John Thomas Troy bought Lord Annesley's townhouse on the corner of Marlborough Street and Elephant Lane (now called Cathedral Street), within sight of the city's premier thoroughfare, Sackville Street (now O'Connell Street) as the location for the planned new cathedral, pending the erection, when funds and the law allowed, of a full Roman Catholic cathedral. In 1814 a public competition had been announced by Archbishop Troy, inviting designs for the new church.

In June 1814 the demolition of the house took place. Constructed between 1815 and 1825, the cathedral combines a number of styles. The exterior is in Greek revival style, while the interior is more Renaissance style, based on the Church of Saint-Philippe du Roule of Paris. Archbishop of Dublin, Daniel Murray, celebrated the new cathedral's completion on 14 November 1825, the feast of Dublin's patron saint, St Laurence O’Toole.

Though not a full cathedral, the new building became a symbol of the Irish nationalist spirit in the era following the ending of the Penal Laws. Daniel O'Connell, the leader of Irish nationalism and the first Roman Catholic MP elected to the British House of Commons, was present at a special thanksgiving High Mass in the cathedral in 1829 following the granting of Catholic Emancipation, which among other things had allowed Catholics to be elected to parliament. In 1841, as the first Catholic Lord Mayor of Dublin in centuries, O'Connell formally celebrated his election by travelling in state to "the Pro" for High Mass. After he died in 1847, his remains were laid in state on a great catafalque in the cathedral.

St Mary's baptism register contains quite a few entries for children born in the nearby Rotunda hospital; they were probably baptised quite quickly due to the feared infant mortality rates of the 19th century.

=== Plans for a full cathedral ===
The cathedral was never intended to be other than a temporary acting cathedral, pending the availability of funds to build a full cathedral. Various locations for the new cathedral were discussed. W. T. Cosgrave, President of the Executive Council of the Irish Free State (prime minister) from 1922 to 1932 and a deeply religious Catholic, suggested that the burnt-out shell of the General Post Office, the location of the 1916 Rising, be turned into a cathedral, but the idea was not acted on, and the GPO was restored for use as a post office.

John Charles McQuaid, who served as archbishop from the 1940s to the early 1970s, bought the gardens in the centre of Merrion Square and announced plans to erect a cathedral there, but to the relief of Dubliners, who preferred a garden in the centre of the city, his plans never came to pass and the gardens were eventually handed over by his successor to Dublin Corporation and opened to the public. While it is suggested periodically that the Church of Ireland, which has a relatively small membership, might hand over one of its cathedrals to the Catholic Church, no serious proposals have been made for such an arrangement. The Dean of St. Patrick's Cathedral (which serves as the "national cathedral" of the Church of Ireland - Christchurch is treated as the diocesan cathedral of Dublin) did suggest allowing Catholic Masses to be celebrated in St. Patrick's but the idea was dropped after opposition within the Church of Ireland. Though theoretically, the possibility of erecting a new Catholic cathedral remains on the agenda, in reality, most of the funds collected for the building of a new cathedral have been spent erecting new churches in what was for a lengthy period a rapidly growing archdiocese.

=== State ceremony in the cathedral ===
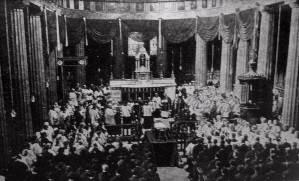
The funeral of Michael Collins in 1922 – a contemporary newspaper drawing. This image shows the original pre-Vatican II Turnerelli high altar, the pulpit (right) and Archbishop's cathedra (left, with canopy)

The cathedral remains a focal point of religious and state ceremonial activity. Up until 1983, incoming presidents of Ireland traditionally attended, prior to their civil inauguration, a religious ceremony in either St Patrick's Cathedral (if they were members of the Church of Ireland) or the Pro-Cathedral (if they were Roman Catholic). Whereas up to 1973, those ceremonies were exclusively denominational, the ceremonies for the inaugurations of President Erskine Hamilton Childers in 1973, President Cearbhall Ó Dálaigh in 1974 and President Patrick Hillery in 1976, were multidenominational, with representatives of the Roman Catholic, Church of Ireland, Presbyterian, Methodist and the Jewish faith taking part in the ceremony. (In 1973 it took place in St Patrick's, in 1974 and 1976 in the Pro-Cathedral.) In 1983 a multidenominational service was included as part of the civil inauguration in Dublin Castle.

The major faiths held religious ceremonies in their main cathedral or pro-cathedral to mark the beginning of the law term or a session of parliament, which would be attended by the President of Ireland, the Taoiseach, ministers, the opposition, parliamentarians and members of the Diplomatic Corps. State funerals of major figures including Michael Collins and former presidents Seán T. O'Kelly, Éamon de Valera, Patrick Hillery and Lord Mayor of Dublin Kathleen Clarke took place there. A painting of the funeral of Michael Collins hangs in Áras an Uachtaráin, the president's residence.

Pope Francis visited the cathedral on 25 August 2018 during an apostolic visit to Ireland.

== Layout ==
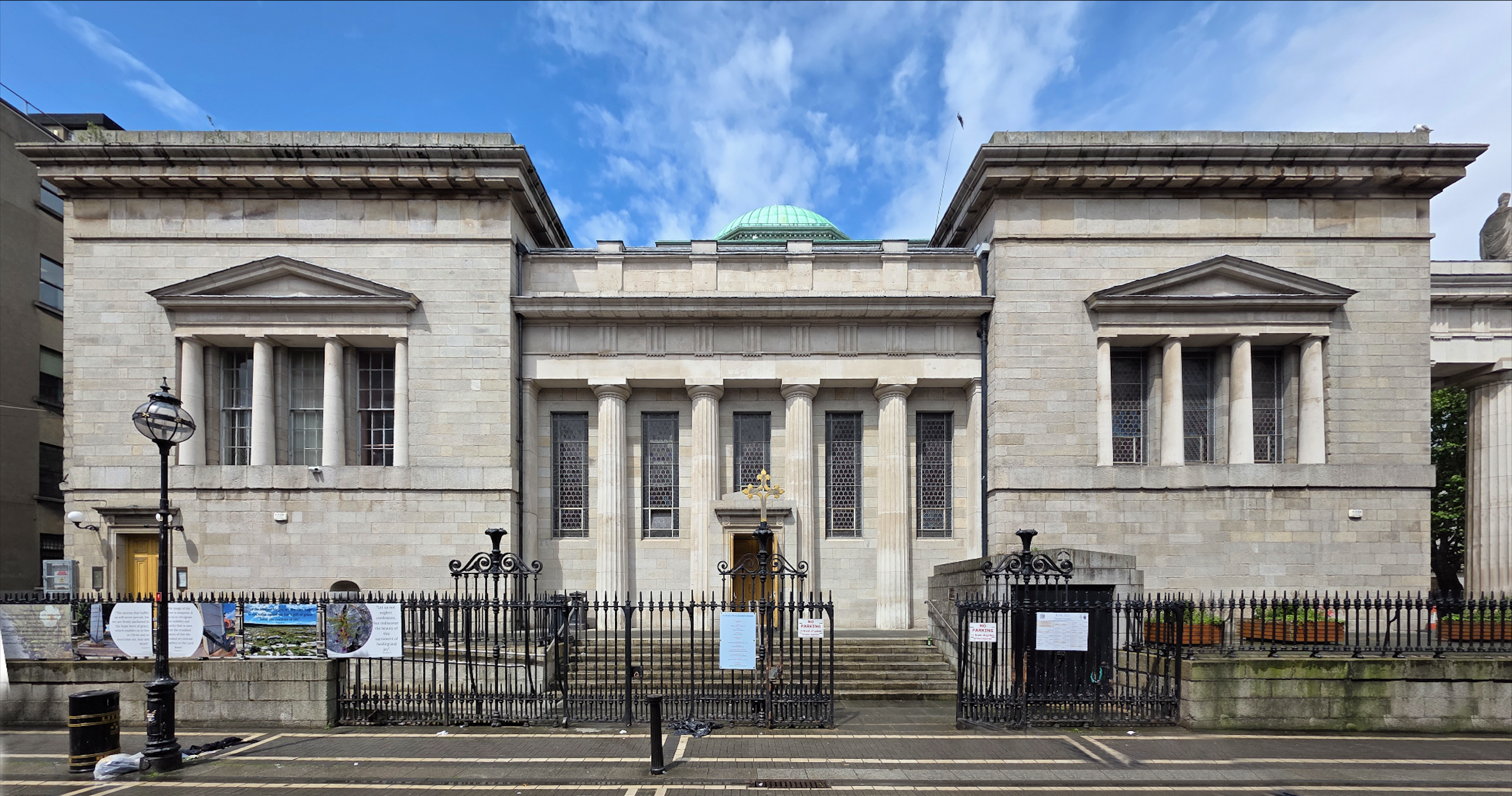
South Facade

Internally, the cathedral is significantly different from the two main cathedrals of Dublin. Its mixture of Greek and Roman styles has proved controversial, being variously described as an artistic gem and an eyesore. Its main aisle leads up to an altar, behind which a stained glass window of the Blessed Virgin Mary (the Saint Mary of its name) is visible. For most of its existence, it possessed a massive Victorian altar and reredos by Peter Turnerelli, a Belfast-born sculptor of Italian parentage. In the late 1970s, this was removed, as part of a re-ordering to bring its sanctuary in line with changes that followed the introduction of the revision of the Mass. The reredos was completely removed, leaving just the tabernacle, though the front panel of the original altar was reinstated in the new altar, which was moved to the centre of a new paved area in an expanded sanctuary. The altar rails were also removed. The pulpit was moved as well, to a position in a corner of the building. A large contingent of Italian artisans were employed by the church, to decorate the interior of the cathedral.

A fire began in September 1993. Though the fire was extinguished before it spread, considerable smoke damage was done to one corner of the building around the monument to Cardinal Cullen, perhaps the most famous of all the nineteenth-century Archbishops, and the first Archbishop of Dublin to be made a cardinal.

In February 2026, the archdiocese announced that the structure would close following Easter celebrations for a two-year refurbishment to mark its elevation to a permanent cathedral. Work is due to include the removal of alterations made during earlier renovations; restoring mosaic flooring and other features; creating improved sightlines for the congregation; improving accommodations for the choir, clergy and staff; exterior cleaning and roof repairs; and adding accessibility features.

== Music ==
=== Organ ===
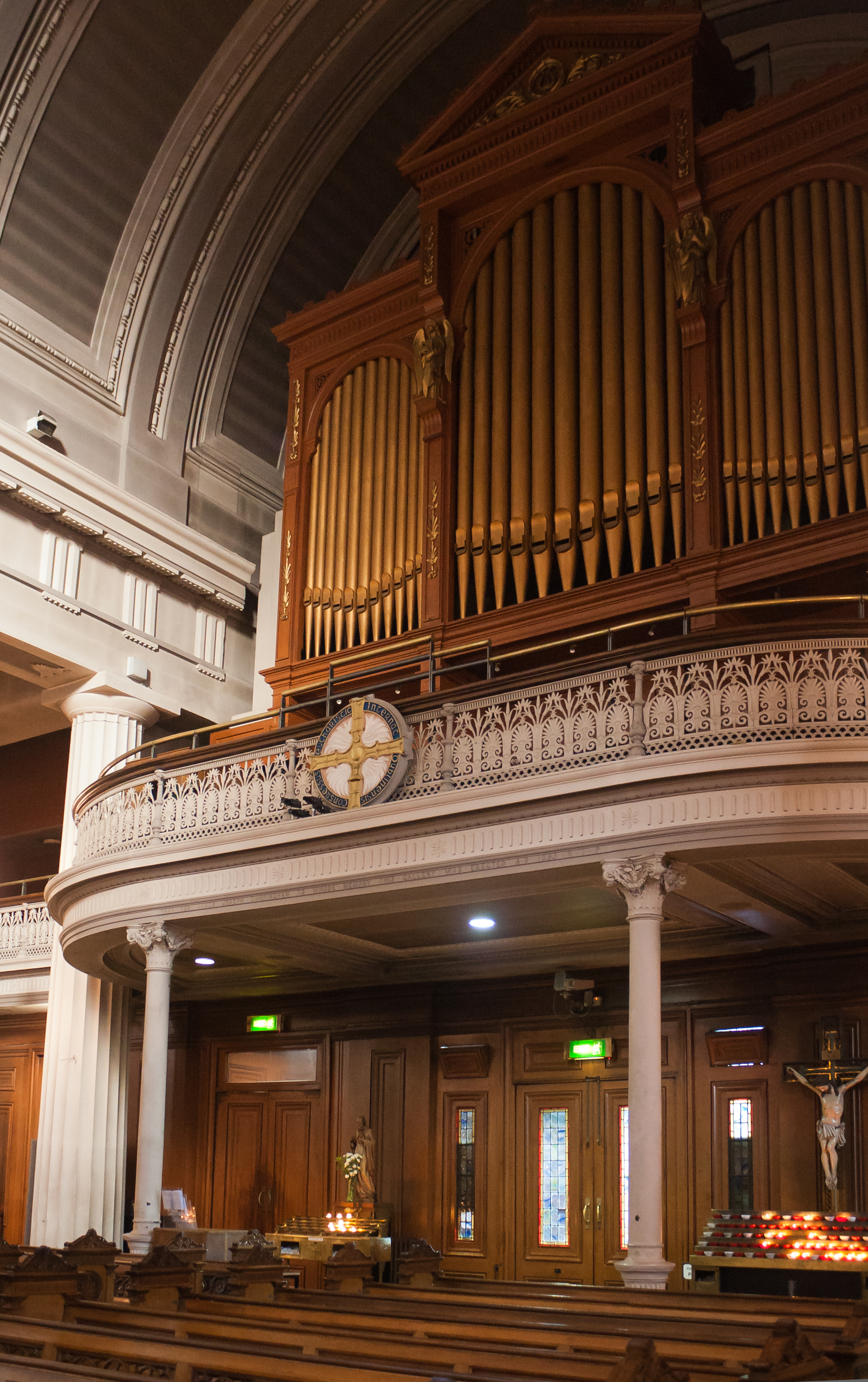
Organ on the gallery at the east-end of the nave.

The original organ in the cathedral was built by the Dublin organ builder, John White, in the late 19th century, and the present instrument contains some of White's original pipework. The present facade of the organ dates from William Hill's rebuild of the organ around 1900. Subsequent work was carried out by Henry Willis & Co. in the 1930s, before J.W. Walker's major rebuild of 1971 under the administrator Monsignor John Moloney and the most recent refurbishment of the instrument, by the same firm which was completed in the autumn of 1995. The newly refurbished instrument was inaugurated in a gala concert given by Olivier Latry on 20 March 1996.

The swell of the organ is built into the back wall of the Church. The shutters of the swell are in line with the rest of the wall. The organ console itself was moved in a general redevelopment of the church in 1995. This was to facilitate the direction of the choir.

Organists who have performed at the cathedral include Daniel Chorzempa, Xavier Darasse, Sir David Lumsden, Daniel Roth, Dame Gillian Weir, Arthur Wills, Olivier Latry, and others. The Titular Organist of Saint Mary's Pro-Cathedral, Gerard Gillen, was appointed to the position in 1976. David Grealy was appointed Associate Organist in September 2017.

A chancel organ built by the Dublin organ builder, John White, is located on the epistle (right) side of the High Altar. It fell into disuse on the reordering of the sanctuary c.1980. Its mechanism and pipework are stored in the bowels of the cathedral. In the early 2000s, a three-stop portable continuo organ was acquired, which provides accompaniment for sanctuary services such as Vespers/Evening Prayer, and is also used for continuo purposes in appropriate choral and orchestral repertoire.

=== Choir ===
The church is known for its Palestrina Choir, the resident choir of Saint Mary's Cathedral. It had its origins in a boys' choir formed in the 1890s by Vincent O'Brien, then a music teacher at St Mary's Place Christian Brothers School in Dublin. It was at a performance of Palestrina's Missa Papae Marcelli at St. Teresa's Carmelite Church in Clarendon Street in 1898 that this choir came to the attention of Edward Martyn, their founding sponsor. Martyn wished to promote the music of Palestrina which was espoused by Pope Pius X as a standard to which liturgical music should aspire. The Palestrina Choir was constituted and installed in the cathedral on 1 January 1903 with O'Brien as director.

In the century since its foundation, the choir has had seven directors. Vincent O'Brien, director until 1946, was succeeded by his son, Oliver. In 1978, Fr Seán O hEarcaigh took over the baton from Oliver O'Brien. He was succeeded in 1982, by Ite O'Donovan and in 1996 by Comdt Joseph Ryan. Órla Barry was the director from the end of 1996 to 2001. As of 2013, the director was Blánaid Murphy. Over the years, the Palestrina Choir has attracted notable singers, including John McCormack who was a member of the choir from 1904 to 1905. The choir has travelled widely, singing at several cathedrals and venues throughout Ireland, Europe, and North America.

During the school term, the Palestrina Choir sing at Sunday morning Solemn Latin Mass (Novus Ordo), Friday evening Vespers & Benediction of the Most Blessed Sacrament (5.15pm) and Mass (5.45pm). A girls' choir was formed in 2009.

== Burials ==
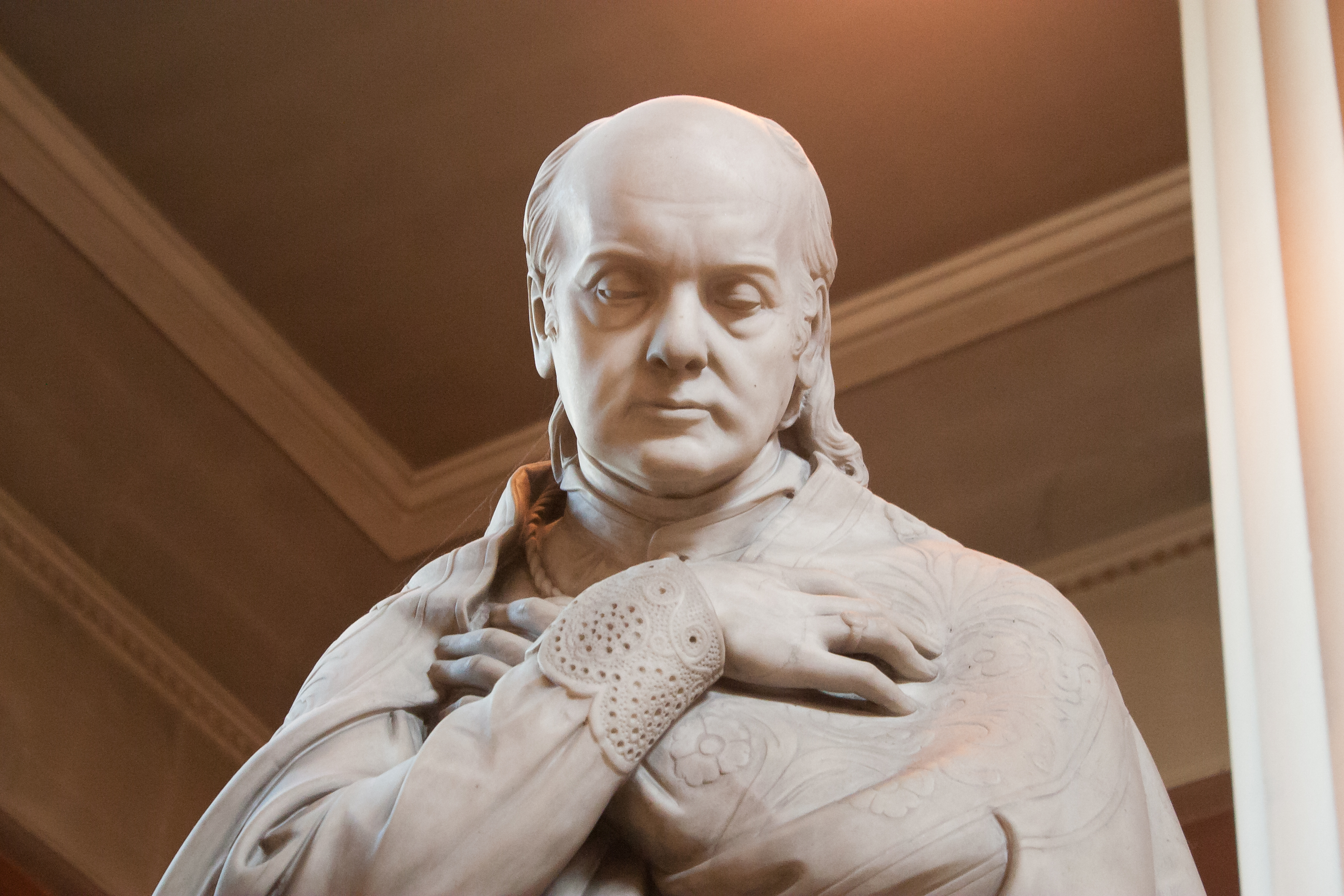
Sculpture of Archbishop Daniel Murray in the north aisle by Thomas Farrell

- John Thomas Troy, Archbishop of Dublin (1786–1823)
- Daniel Murray, Archbishop of Dublin (1823–1852)
- Edward Joseph Byrne, Archbishop of Dublin (1921–1940)
- John Charles McQuaid, Archbishop of Dublin (1940–1972)
- Dermot Ryan, Archbishop of Dublin (1972–1984)
- Kevin McNamara, Archbishop of Dublin (1984–1987)
- Desmond Connell, Archbishop of Dublin (1988–2004)

== Interior ==
The post-1982 altar using part of Turnerelli's old high altar and High Mass candlesticks

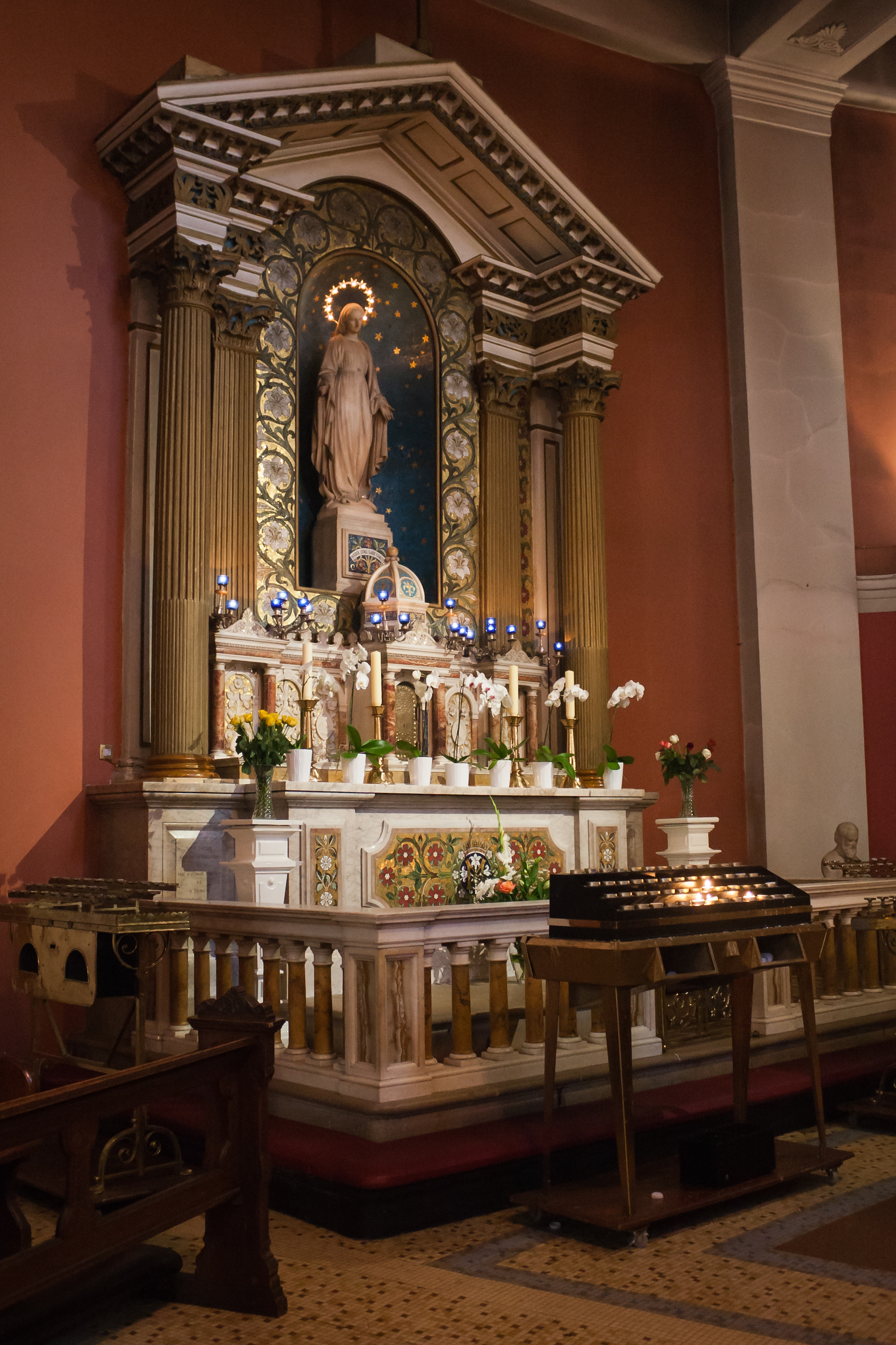
Immaculata Altar

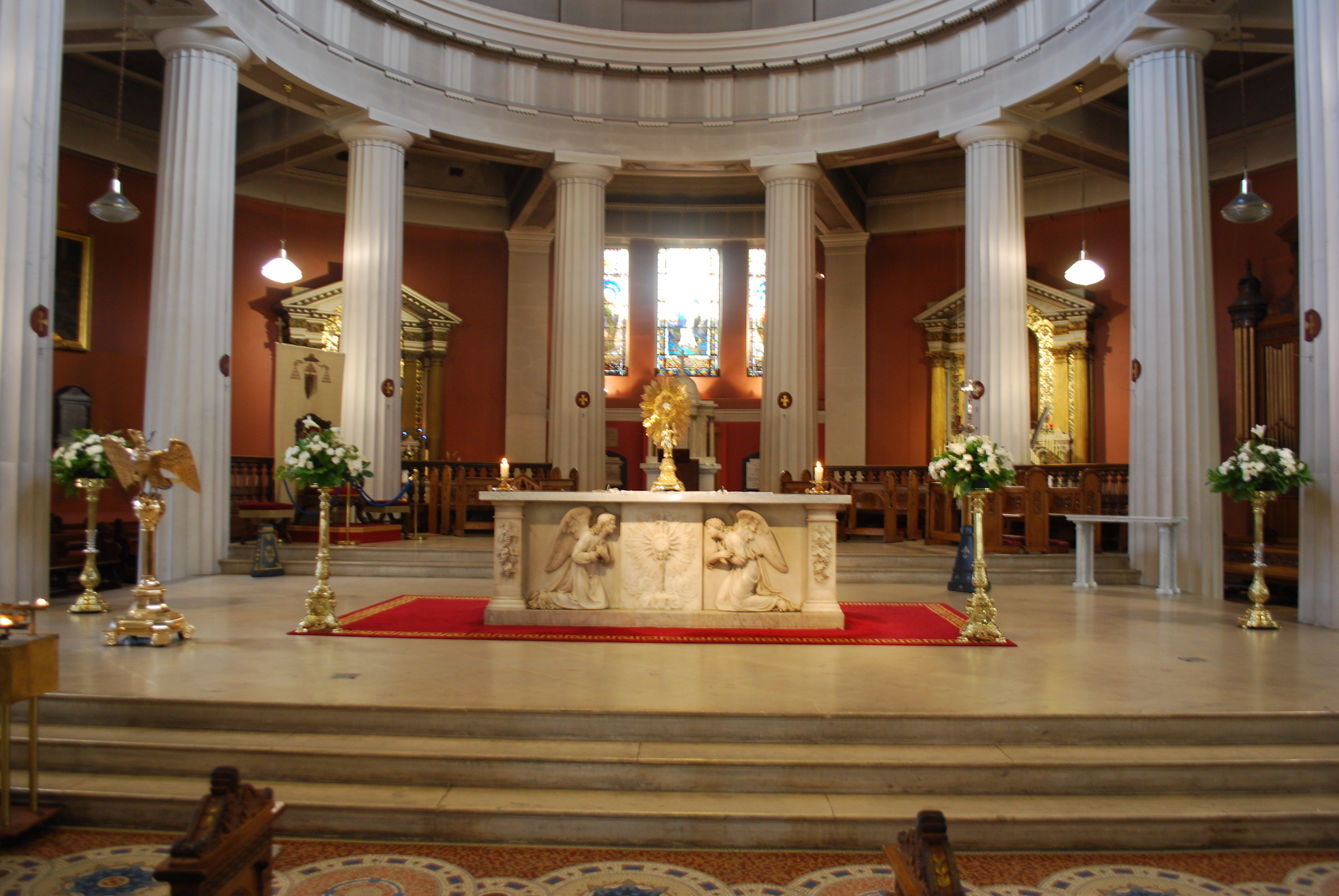
Sanctuary

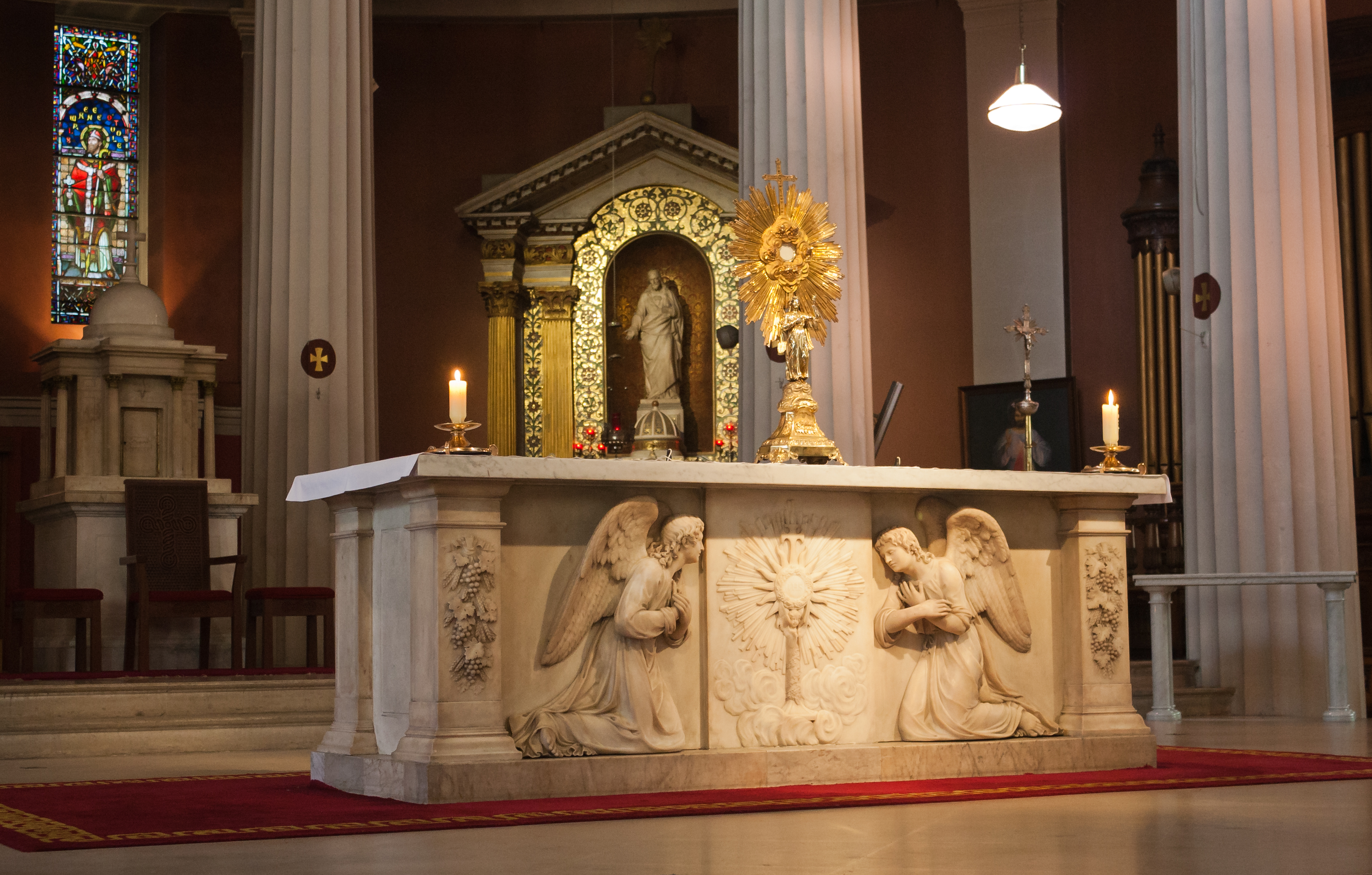
Altar

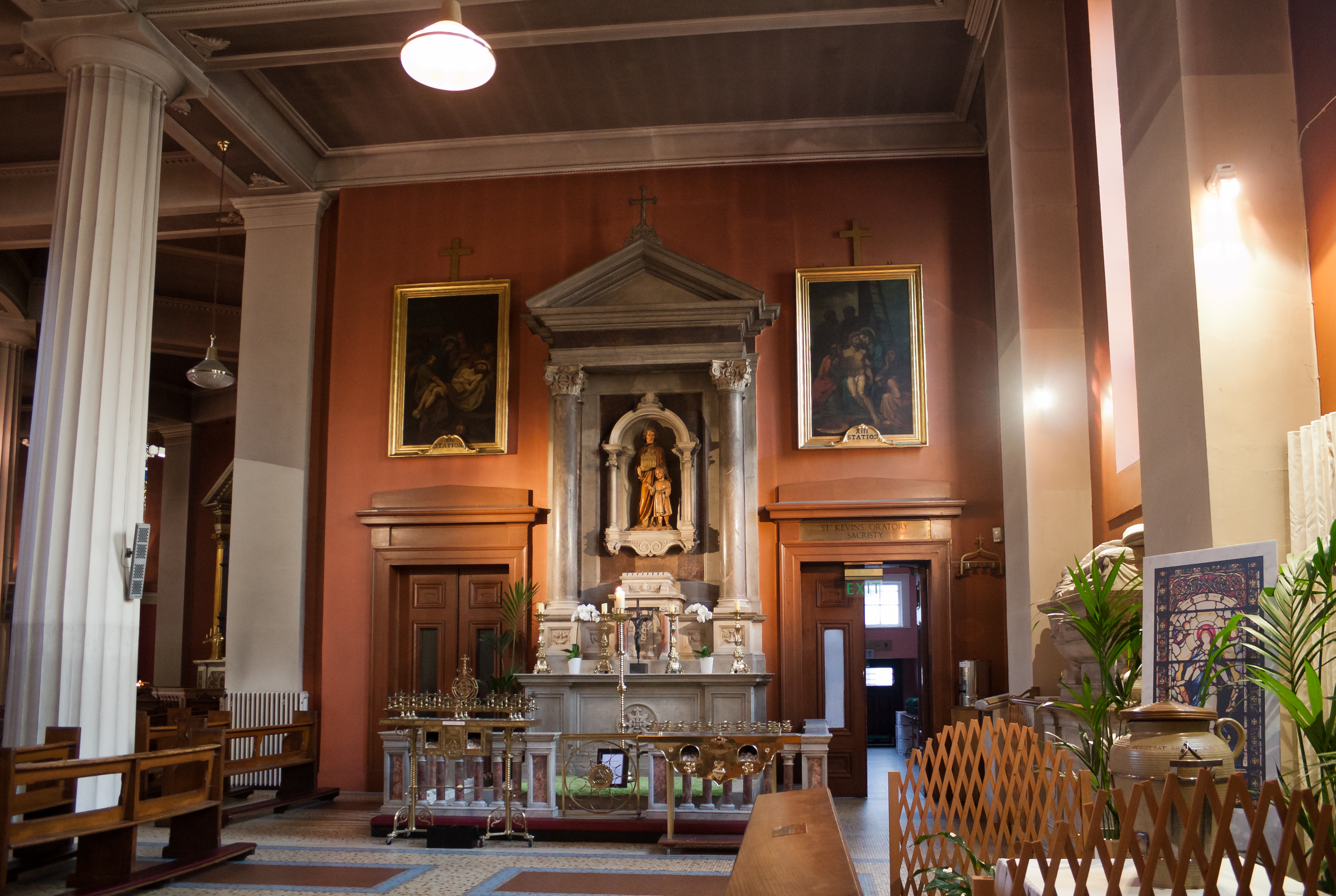
St Joseph's Altar

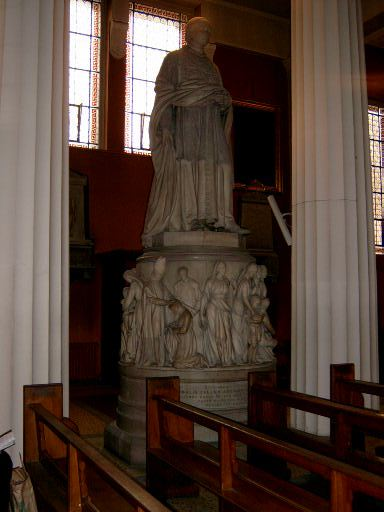
Monument to Paul, Cardinal Cullen, the first Irishman to be made a cardinal

== See also ==
- Catholic Marian churches
