= John Austin (Jesuit) =

Irish Jesuit educator and preacher

John Austin, S.J. (12 April 1717, Dublin - 29 September 1784, Dublin), was an Irish Jesuit. Austin was a noted educator and preacher.

== Life ==
John Austin was born in Dublin on 12 April 1717. As a young man, Austin left Ireland for France where, at the age of 18, he entered the Society of Jesus in Nancy on 27 November 1735. He made his vows on 28 November 1737. He studied logic and physics at Pont-à-Mousson, and after completing his higher studies, was employed in teaching humanities for several years at Reims. His ordination on 22 September 1747, was followed by two years studying theology at the Irish college in Poitiers. He held the office of Prefect of the Irish College at Poitiers.

In 1750 he returned to Dublin, where he opened a school. John O'Keeffe was one of his students. Thomas Betagh was a student at Austin's school in Saul's Court off Fishamble Street. Betagh went on to become a Jesuit and in 1781 set up a number of free schools for the poor boys of Dublin. In 1770 Austin and Father James Mulcaile set up a boarding school.

Austin was allowed to profess the fourth vow specific to the Society on 2 February 1754. He obtained renown as a preacher. Topham Bowden, an English writer, noted in his book, Tour through Ireland (1791), that "... Austin was a very remarkable character, of extraordinary learning and piety; he was a great preacher, and injured his health by his exertions in the pulpit."

Austin died in Dublin on 29 September 1784, and was buried in the churchyard of St. Kevin's Church in that city. The inscription over his grave describes him as "pius, doctus, indefessus operarius, apostolicis confectus laboribus. Divites admonuit, pauperes sublevavit, juventutem erudivit, orphanis loco parentis fuit, de omni hominum genere prseclare meruit, omnibus omnia factus ut omnes Christo lucrifaceret."

A portrait of Austin, painted by George Petrie, and engraved by Henry Brocas, was published in 1792.
