= William Behnes =

British sculptor (1795–1864)

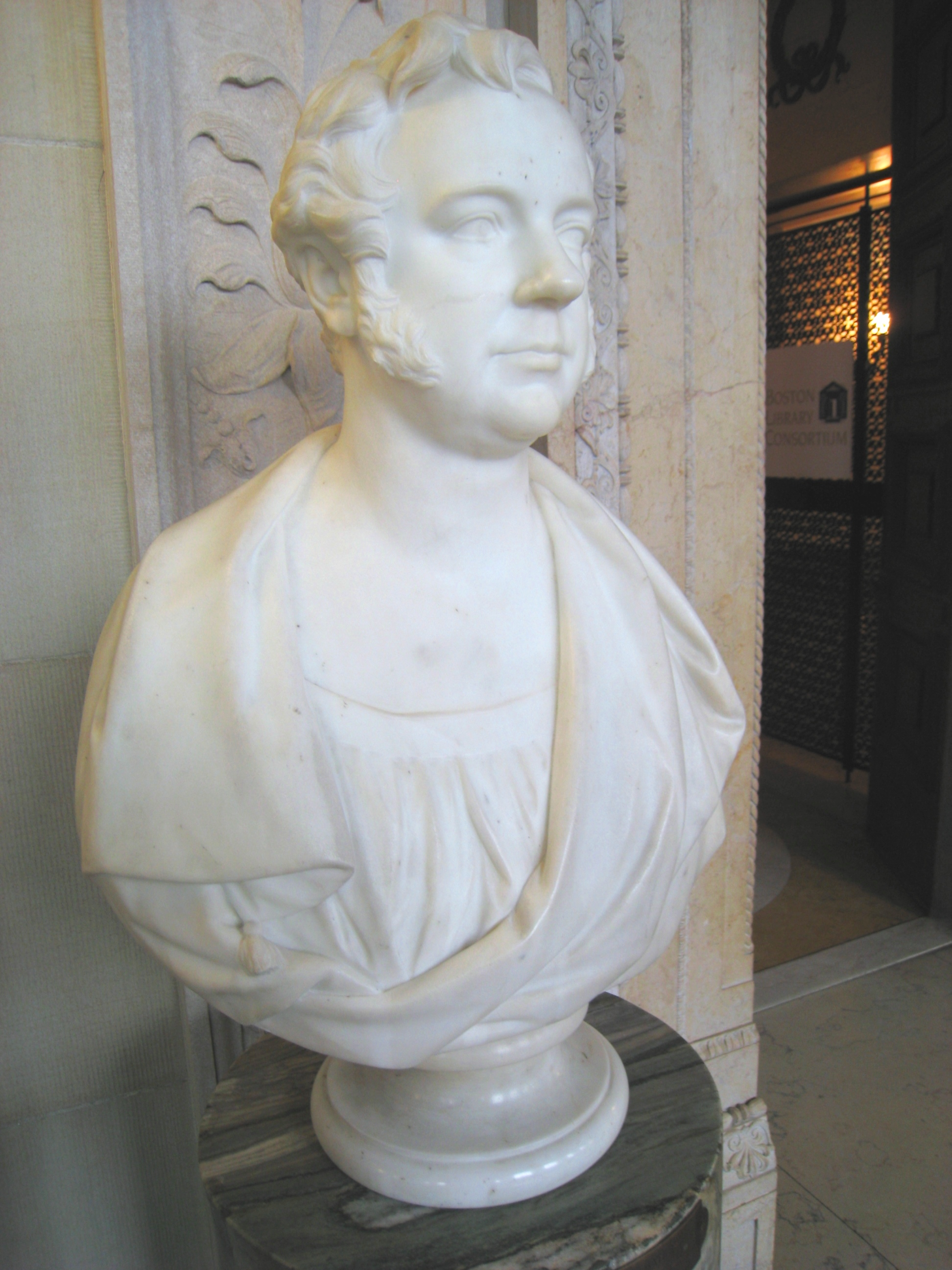
Bust of banker Joshua Bates, by William Behnes

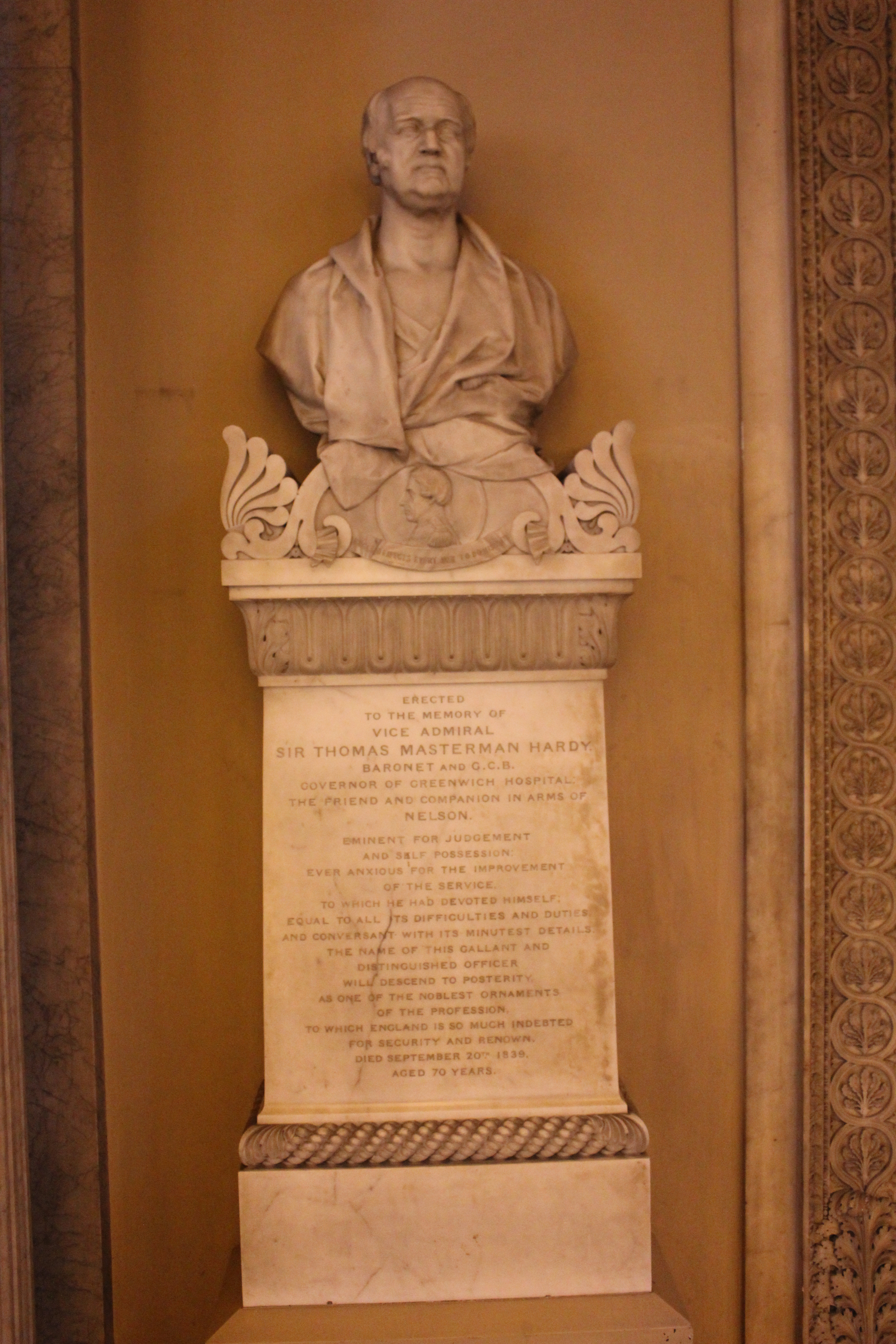
Memorial to Sir Thomas Hardy by William Behnes in Chapel at Greenwich's Old Royal Naval College.

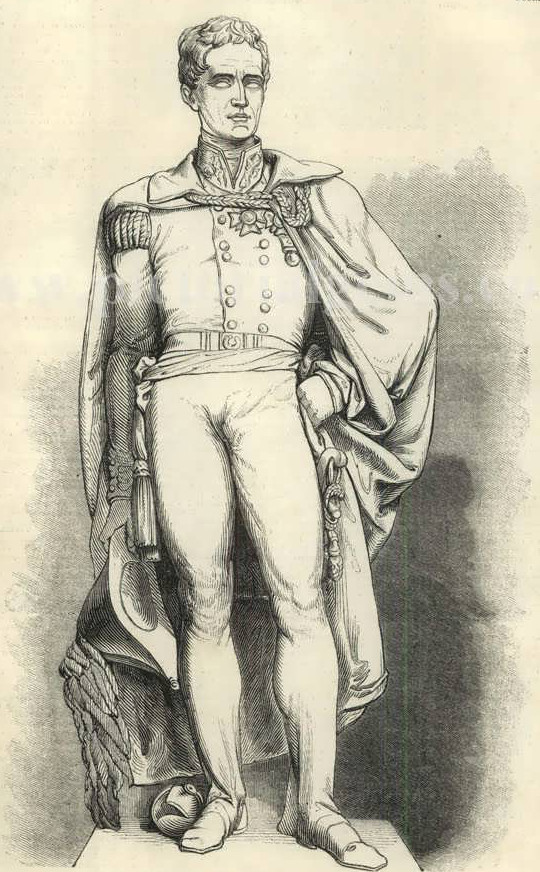
An engraving of John Jones's memorial in St. Paul's Cathedral, carved by William Behnes

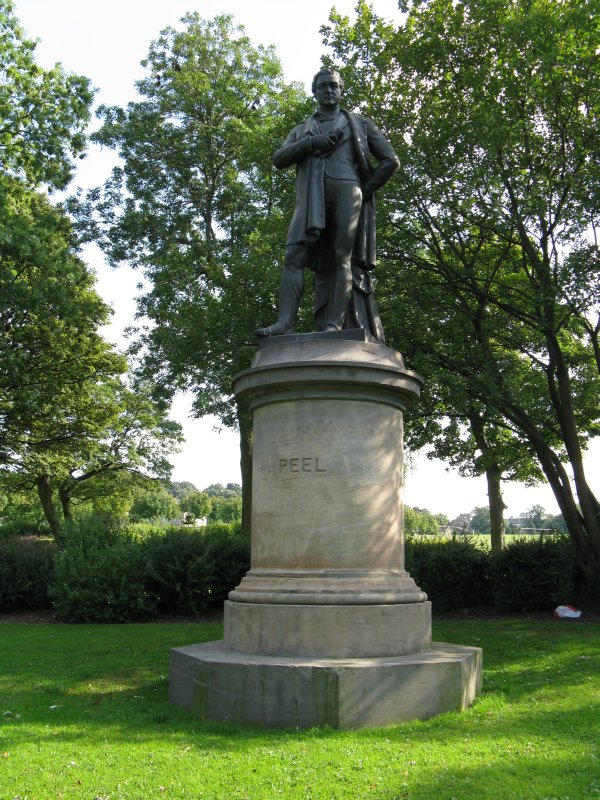
Statue of Robert Peel in Peel Park, Bradford

William Behnes (1795 – 3 January 1864) was a British sculptor of the early 19th century.

== Life ==
Born in London, Behnes was the son of a Hanoverian piano-maker and his English wife. His brother was Henry Behnes, also a sculptor, albeit an inferior one. The family moved to Dublin and there William studied art at the Dublin Academy.

After the family returned to London, Behnes continued his artistic training, studying at the Royal Academy School of Art from 1813, under the tutorship of Peter Francis Chenu. As a painter, he exhibited at the Royal Academy in 1815 and won several medals during the ensuing years. In 1819 he won a Society of Arts gold medal for inventing an instrument to assist sculpture work, having by this time begun to practice successfully as a sculptor.

In 1837 Behnes was appointed 'Sculptor in Ordinary' to Queen Victoria. His pupils included noted sculptors George Frederic Watts, Thomas Woolner and Henry Weekes, and naturalist Benjamin Waterhouse Hawkins.

Despite huge success, being declared "superior to Chantrey" in bust portraiture, he could not manage his finances and was declared bankrupt in 1861. His final work, the statue of Sir Henry Havelock (1861) in Trafalgar Square, has the claim to fame of being the first known statue based purely upon a photograph of his subject.

It is likely that he was an alcoholic and also a gambler, and this was worsened by bankruptcy. He moved to "miserable lodgings" in Charlotte Street.

He was found lying unconscious in a gutter, with only three pence in his pocket, on New Years Day 1864 and died on 3 January in Middlesex Hospital.

He was buried in an unmarked grave in Kensal Green Cemetery. George Cruikshank, who had known him, campaigned to raise money for a monument and to present a bronze bust of Behnes to the National Gallery, but there was little progress and the campaign was abandoned.

In December 2016, a folio of 41 pages of Behnes' sketches (some double-sided) was sold at auction by Cuttlestones Auctioneers & Valuers at Penkridge in Staffordshire, for £2,200. It includes sketches of the Duke of Newcastle, Sir Thomas Gresham, and Sir Robert Peel.

== Works ==
He produced many busts of children, reliefs and also some notable church monuments and statues, including ones of Dr William Babington in St Paul's Cathedral and Major-General Sir Henry Havelock (believed to be the first statue based on a photograph, two casts were made – one is today situated in Trafalgar Square, London, the other in Mowbray Park, Sunderland) and several of Sir Robert Peel (including ones situated in Leeds, Peel Park in Bradford, and at the Peel Centre in Hendon in north-west London). Other subjects included: Thomas Arnold, Sir Joshua Reynolds, Benjamin West and George Cruikshank.

- Bust of Henry Earle, surgeon, Foundling Hospital, London (1817)
- Monument to John Tunno, St. John's Wood Chapel (1819)
- Bust of Dr William Lister FRSE Governor of St Thomas' Hospital in London (1820)
- Monument to Joseph Nollekens, Paddington Parish Church, London (1823)
- Bust of Joseph Marryat, St George's, Grenada, West Indies (1824)
- Bust of James Northcote (1825)
- Bust of Sir Isaac Coffin, 1st Baronet, Athenaeum, Boston, USA (1826)
- Statue of the Earl of Egremont, Petworth House (1826)
- Bust of Oliver Goldsmith, Trinity College, Dublin (1827)
- Wax bust of Princess Victoria (Later Queen Victoria) (using her actual hair) (1829)
- Figures on the clock-tower at Buckingham Palace (1829)
- Monument to Dr Andrew Bell, Westminster Abbey (1832)
- Monument to Admiral Sir Henry Blackwood, Westminster Abbey (1832)
- Monument to John Woodhouse, Dean of Lichfield, Stoke-on-Trent Parish Church (1833)
- Monument to Sir Henry Russell, 1st Baronet, Swallowfield, Berkshire, (1836)
- Bust of Sir Benjamin Collins Brodie, 1st Baronet, Royal College of Surgeons, London (1836)
- Statue of William Babington, St Paul's Cathedral (1837)
- Monument to William Praed, Tyringham Church (1837)
- Bust of Queen Victoria (1837)
- Monument to Sir John St Aubyn, 5th Baronet, Crowan, Cornwall (1839)
- Bust of Sir Thomas Hardy, naval hero, Greenwich Hospital Chapel (1839)
- Statue of Baron Joy, Dublin (1840)
- The mare's head "The Queen of Beauty" as ridden by Lord Seymour (1843)
- Statue of Sir John Thomas Jones, St Paul's Cathedral (1843)
- Statue of Sir Thomas Gresham, Royal Exchange, London (1845)
- Statue of Sir William Follett, Westminster Abbey, (1850)
- Statue of Robert Peel, Leeds (1852)
- Statue of Robert Peel, Peel Park, Bradford (1855)
- Statue of Robert Peel, Peel Centre, previously Cheapside and Postman's Park, Grade II listed, possible copy of the Bradford work (1855)
- Monument to Mrs Elsworth, Highgate Cemetery (1858)
- Statue of Sir Henry Havelock, Trafalgar Square, (1861) (plus a copy in Sunderland)
- Statue of Lord Harris, Governor of Trinidad (not dated, referenced in J.H. Collens, Guide to Trinidad, Vol I, p. 61, 1886). Now lost.
