= Thomas Betagh =

Irish Jesuit priest

Thomas Betagh SSJ
- Born: 1737; Kells, County Meath, Ireland
- Died: 16 February 1811 (aged 73–74); Dublin, Ireland
- Resting place: Old St. Michan's church, Dublin; moved to SS. Michael and John church, Dublin; moved to Glasnevin Cemetery, Dublin
- Education: John Austin's school, Dublin
- Occupations: Jesuit priest (ordained 1766), teacher, professor of languages
- Known for: establishing free Dr Betagh Schools in Dublin

Thomas Betagh (1737 – 16 February 1811) was an Irish Jesuit priest, schoolteacher, and professor of languages at Pont-à-Mousson Jesuit scholasticate (France). Betagh established a number of free schools in Dublin, which taught over 300 boys. These schools also provided clothing for the most destitute of the pupils, where a total of over three thousand boys had been educated. The schools were afterwards known as the Dr Betagh Schools.

== Life ==
Betagh was descended from a branch of an old Roman catholic family in Meath, Ireland, which, through the Cromwellian confiscations, lost considerable estates. He was born in Kells, County Meath. His father was a tanner. Betagh was attended John Austin's school in Saul's Court in Dublin.

At an early age Beltagh was admitted to the seminary of the Society of Jesus at Pont-à-Mousson in France. He spent most of his Jesuit years of spiritual and intellectual formation in France and was ordained a priest at Pont-à-Mousson on 24 May 1766. He resided at Paris and Metz as a professor of languages before returning to Ireland in 1769.

In Dublin he worked with Fathers Austin, James Mulcaile SJ, and Fullham in the old chapel at Rosemary Lane, and taught at the school in Saul's Court. With them, he also assisted the secular clergy for years. In 1773 the Jesuits was suppressed by pope Clement XIV, so Betagh had to seek incardination into a diocese. (The Order was restored only six months after his death.) He served as a curate, and succeeded the Rev. Field as parish priest of SS. Michael and John's on Exchange Street. The parish was located in one of the poorest areas of Dublin. Betagh established free schools in Schoolhouse Lane, off Cook Street, then in Skinner's Row, and finally in Smock Alley, catering for about 330 boys. Amongst his pupils were the future Archbishop of Dublin Daniel Murray, and the founder of Clongowes Wood Fr. Peter Kenney SJ who reestablished the Jesuits in Ireland, whose studies he sponsored.

Betagh later became Vicar-General of the Archdiocese of Dublin. Until just before his death he taught each evening at these schools and provided clothing for the most destitute of the pupils, where a total of over three thousand boys had been educated. The schools were afterwards known as the Dr Betagh Schools. The chapel in Rosemary Lane was in a ruinous state, but before Betagh died the foundation-stone of the new Church of SS. Michael and John in Exchange Street was laid, which was partially opened on Christmas Day, 1813.

He died at his residence, 80 Cook Street. His funeral was attended by over 20,000 persons. His remains were interred in the Jesuits' vaults in Old St. Michan's, Church Street. About 1822 they were removed to the vault of his own church, SS. Michael and John, under the High Altar, where a monument to his memory was also erected. This was sculpted by his one time student (who had subsequently turned to sculpture), Peter Turnerelli.

In 1990 his remains were moved to Glasnevin Cemetery.
