= Peter Francis Chenu =

British sculptor

Peter Francis Chenu (1760–1834) was a British sculptor of French birth working in the late 18th and early 19th century.

== Life and career ==
Pierre Francois Chenu, later Peter Francis Chenu, was born in Paris in Saint-Nicolas-des-Champs (Oct 1, 1760), into a family of sculptors. His father was Nicolas-Francois Chenu, a sculptor and an assistant professor and exhibitor at the Academie de Saint-Luc. His mother was Marie-Francoise Marchandon, the daughter of another sculptor from the same academy, Firmin Marchandon.

[There has been confusion perpetuated in various sources as there was another Peter Chenu who was born in 6 Jan 1760, in London. This Peter was the son of Joshua, a carver, was apprenticed, married Jane Norris or Morris in 1799, and died in rather horrible circumstances in 1800. No connection has been found between these two families. There was also a Pierre, sometimes Peter, Chenu, an engraver and French printmaker who was born in Paris and died around 1800.]

In 1778, aged 18, Pierre Francois was a student at the Academie Royale de Peinture et Sculpture in Paris and is mentioned in their archive from then until 1782 after which there is no more mention of him. He is a native of Paris, a student of M. Allegrain and lives at the house of his father in Rue Neuve St Martin pres Le Temple.

In 1784 he entered the School of the Royal Academy, London, studying sculpture, winning a silver medal in 1785 and gold in 1786. He exhibited at the academy from 1788 until 1822.

In 1778 he hired a studio at 28 Great Castle St, moving in 1790 to 3 Wardour Street. In 1794 he hired a larger studio at 122 Wardour Street. Following success he moved to 23 Charles Street where he stayed 1802 until 1822. His last address was 1 Union Street, Lambeth.

In 1805 he is recorded as having purchased busts by his contemporaries, Peter Scheemakers and Thomas Banks.

He retired in 1822. He died on 31 August 1834 and his will was read on 10 September 1834. He appears to have never married nor had any children and his estate was passed to two nephews, the sons of his brother Denis Marie Chenu who had also been a sculptor and had studied at the Royal Academy in London before becoming a French stove maker. The estate included shares in Covent Garden Theatre.

He is known to have trained Peter Turnerelli, William Behnes and Patrick MacDowell.

== Works ==
see

- Restoration of the Torso (1786) (RA gold medal)
- Bust of Dr Herschell (1788)
- Walter Strickland, Beverley Minster (1788)
- A 2m high figure candlebra and other figures to hold lights (1788–1799)
- Lord Pigot (1795), Patshull Hall
- Sir Robert Pigot, 2nd Baronet (1796), Patshull Hall
- James Andrew (1796), Barkway, Hertfordshire
- Monument to Peter Smith, Ely Cathedral (1796)
- Monument to Charles Nairn, Cranbrook, Kent (1796)
- Monument to Henry Rice, Dover Parish Church (1797)
- Monument to John Beaufoy, Upton Grey, Hertfordshire (1809)
- Monument to Mary Golding, Ditton, Kent (1809)
- Decorative work on a building in St James's Park (1810)
- Monument to Sir Thomas Style, Baronet, Wateringbury, Kent (1813)
- Monument to Mary Watten, Woodchester, Gloucestershire (1817)
- The Seated Hercules (1819)
- Monument to Thomas Gorsuch, Barkway, Hertfordshire (1821)
- Aurora (1833)
