= John Carpenter (archbishop of Dublin) =

Irish Catholic prelate (1729–1786)

The Most Reverend John Carpenter DTh
- Archbishop of Dublin and Primate of Ireland
- Archdiocese: Dublin
- Appointed: 10 April 1770
- Term ended: 29 October 1786
- Predecessor: Patrick Fitzsimons
- Successor: John Troy

Orders
- Ordination: 1752
- Consecration: 3 June 1770

Personal details
- Born: Seán Mac an tSaor or Maca tSaoir
- Died: 29 October 1786
- Buried: St. Michan's Churchyard, Dublin
- Denomination: Roman Catholic

John Carpenter (1729 – 29 October 1786), (in Irish Gaelic Seán Mac an tSaor or Seán Maca tSaoir) was an Irish Catholic prelate who served as Archbishop of Dublin from 1770 until death in 1786.

== Biography ==
John Carpenter was born in 1729 in Dublin. His father was a merchant tailor, of Chancery Lane, a respectable residential area near the law courts. His early schooling took place at South Earl Street, where, between the years 1744–1747, he "was associated with the Gaelic language and cultural circle which had formed around Tadhg Ó Neachtain, scion of a Connacht bardic family who had settled in Dublin. It was probably under Ó Neachtain's influence that he compiled an Irish grammar, a miscellany of prose and poetry and a book of devotion for his personal use which included part of the Imitatio Christi in Ulster Irish. He also collected manuscripts written in Irish, particularly those of a devotional nature.

In 1747, at the age of eighteen, he became a student at the Irish College of Lisbon, and was ordained a priest five years later. He successfully studied for a doctorate in theology, returning to Dublin in 1754 to begin his ministry at St. Mary's Chapel on Liffey Street.

=== Early ministry ===
During his early pastoral career, he gained a reputation as an elegant preacher and a zealous catechist who had built three schools for the poor and orphaned and managed to stay above diocesan party politics. He was not afraid, however, to challenge established, diocesan custom. In 1763, for instance, he put his name to a complaint that many parish priests were cheating their assistant priests regarding the chapel door collections.

In 1756 Archbishop Patrick Fitzsimons appointed him prebendary of Cullen. Fitzsimons and his colleagues bore enough confidence in his abilities to send him to the royal court of Portugal on behalf of Lisbon's Irish College, which had been confiscated by the government in 1759. During the 1760s he joined the Catholic Committee, becoming associated with John Curry and Charles O'Conor of Belanagare, in their efforts to reverse the Penal Laws. With O'Conor, he shared an abiding interest in the Irish language and its attendant culture.

In 1767 Fitzsimons sent him to London as secretary to Nicholas Taaffe, Viscount Taaffe, who sought to negotiate the wording of the Test Oath. Taffe was impressed with Carpenter, and recommended him to his superiors for promotion.

== Archbishop of Dublin ==
In late 1769, Archbishop Fitzsimons was described in a letter as "old, blind, hors de combat and perhaps already dead." On 15 April 1770, Carpenter was appointed his successor, and was consecrated on 3 June of that year. Mindful of the limits of Catholic practise in Ireland under the Ascendancy, the latter ceremony had to take place in a private house.

In 1773 he was invited to join the Dublin Society (now the Royal Dublin Society), an act of unofficial recognition that in the context of the penal laws was described by Charles O'Conor of Belanagare as: "...a revolution in our moral and civil affairs the more extraordinary, as in my own days such a man would only be spoken to through the medium of a warrant and constable."

Archbishop Carpenter held the parish of St Nicholas as his mensal, and "resided in a large house on Usher's Island...[saying] Mass in Francis Street every Sunday at eight o'clock." Enjoying the support of his clergy, Archbishop Carpenter's first act was "to ensure that collections taken up at the church door were properly divided between parish priests and assistants." Commenting further on these aspects of his ministry, his entry in the 2004 Oxford Dictionary of National Biography says of him:

"An assiduous administrator, Archbishop Carpenter visited his diocese regularly and his first publication was a set of provincial and synodal constitutions. This appeared in 1770. His pastoral priority was to improve standards of religious and moral practice among clergy and laity alike. In this context, he was especially concerned about clerical drunkenness. His social concerns were part of a broader political vision for he was convinced that the maintenance of moral and social order was the best way to persuade the government to relax anti-Catholic legislation. He enjoyed good relations with Protestants. In 1773 he was admitted to the Royal Dublin Society, an event described by Charles O'Conor as 'a revolution in our moral and civil affairs the more extraordinary, as in my own days such a man would only be spoken to through the medium of a warrant and constable.' This was an indication not only of changing religious attitudes in the establishment, but also of the widespread esteem for Carpenter's character and learning."

In related areas, he aided the publication of Alban Butler's anonymous catechism of 1777, while in 1780 he himself produced Butler's revised Lives of the Saints, which featured Irish saints prominently. He also oversaw the continuing of primary education for Catholics in his diocese. His work lessened from c. 1780 due to increasing ill health, but he was still able to continue lobbying for the repeal of the Penal Laws, a test-oath acceptable to Catholics, and gradually re-establishing the Irish Catholic church's link with the Irish government. A firm defender of property, and law and order, he denounced oath-bound secret societies such as those of Dublin workers who used industrial strife to gain concessions and working rights.

Archbishop Carpenter died on 29 October 1786, and was buried in the graveyard of Saint Michan's in a plot owned by his brother-in-law, Thomas Lee. The sale of his effects took place, the proceeds from which went to supporting the school of a Teresa Mulally. Upon his death he was succeeded by the Bishop of Ossory, John Thomas Troy.

Catholic Church titles
| Preceded by Patrick Fitzsimons | Archbishop of Dublin; 1770–1786 | Succeeded by John Troy |
