= Edward Tracy Turnerelli =

British artist and activist

Edward Tracy Turnerelli (13 October 1813 - 24 January 1896) was a British artist, travel writer and Conservative activist.

He was born in London to the sculptor Peter Turnerelli. He studied modelling under his father and at the Royal Academy, before travelling to Russia in 1836. Under the patronage of Tsar Nicholas I, Turnerelli toured Russia for 18 years before returning to England in 1854. He married Martha Hankey, which gave him an independent income, and spent the rest of his life campaigning for the Conservatives.

In the aftermath of Lord Beaconsfield's triumphant return from the Congress of Berlin in 1878, Turnerelli organised the "People's Tribute" to him. 52,800 working men from 115 towns subscribed to a fund that paid for a 22-carat gold Roman wreath that was to crown Beaconsfield at a ceremony in the Crystal Palace. However, Beaconsfield declined the tribute.

== Works ==
- Tales of the Rhenish Chivalry (1835).
- Kazan et ses habitants (in French), St. Petersburg, 1841.
- Kazan, the Ancient Capital of the Tartar Khans (1854).
- What I know of the late Emperor Nicholas (1855).
- A Night in a Haunted House (1859).
- Memories of a Life of Toil, or the Autobiography of the Old Conservative (1884).
