= Peter Turnerelli =

Irish-born sculptor

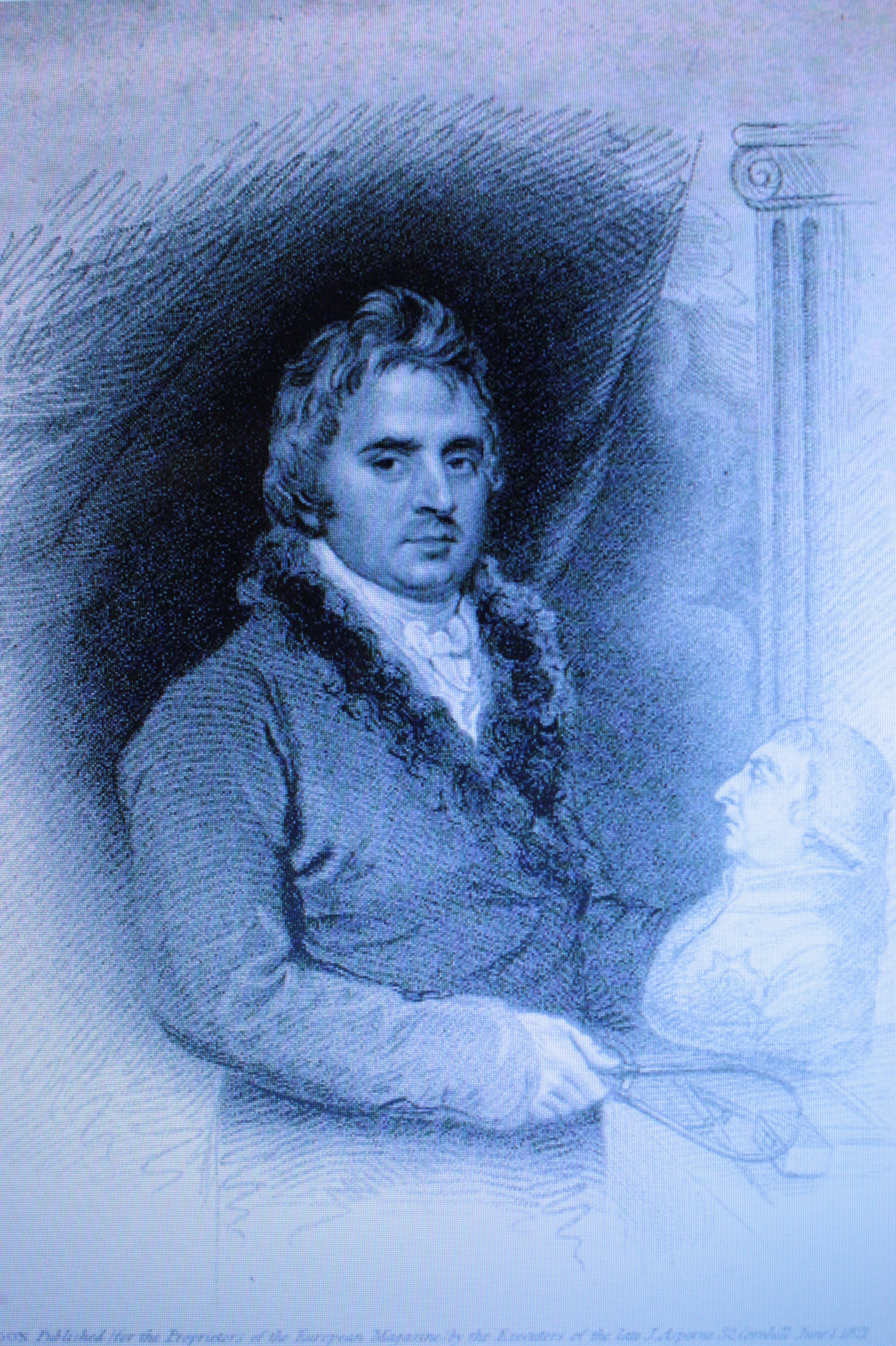
Peter Turnerelli, engraved by James Thomson, 1821

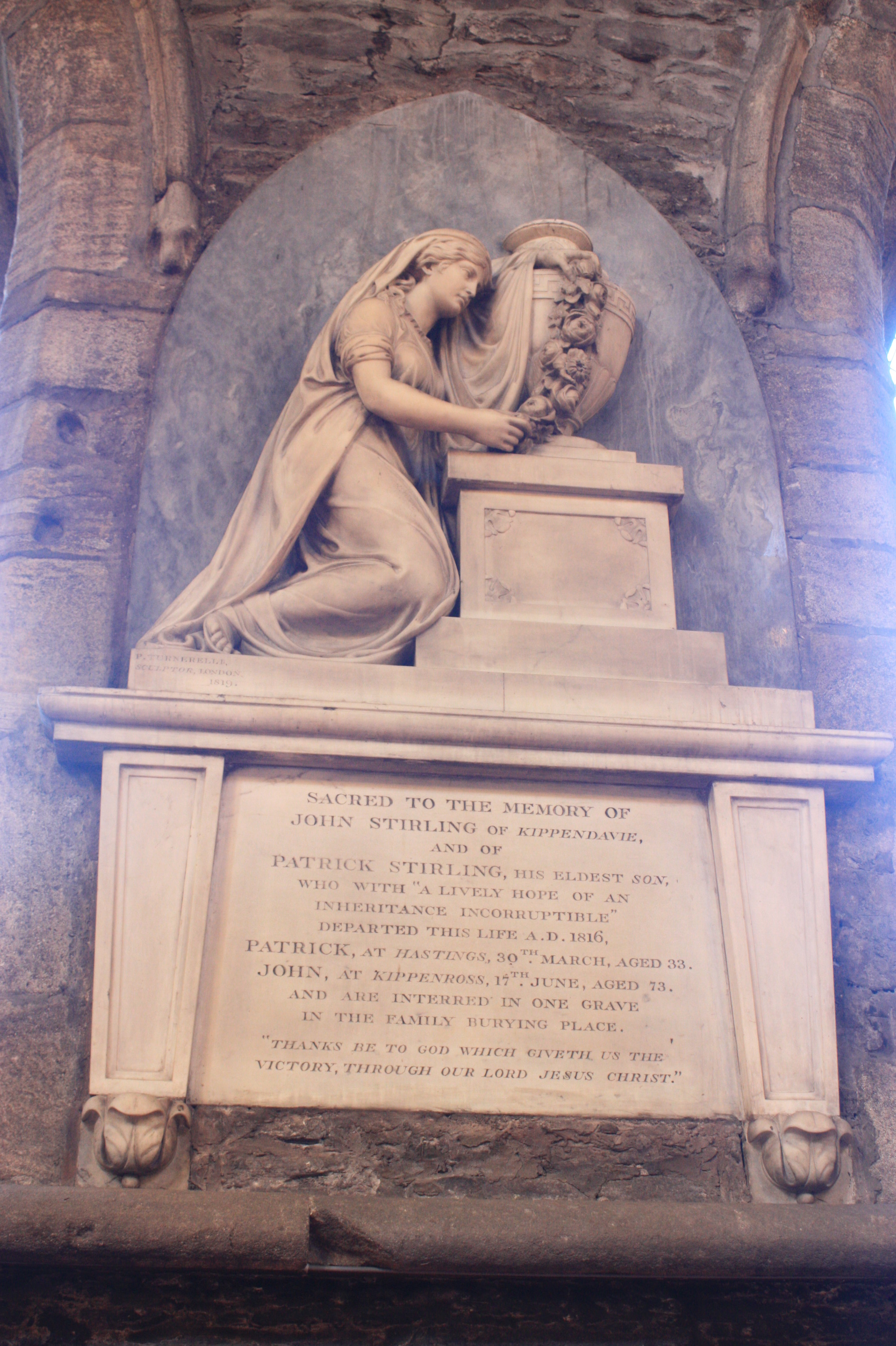
The grave of John Stirling by Peter Turnerelli, Dunblane Cathedral, Scotland

Peter Turnerelli (c.1772–1839) was an Irish-born sculptor of Italian descent working in Britain in the early 19th century.

== Life and career ==
He was born in Belfast, the son of Iacomo (James) Turnerelli, a sculptor, whose own father had left Italy as a refugee, despite being landed gentry in the Lake Como region. His grandfather's surname had been Tognarelli, but this was quickly adapted to the Irish vernacular. The family moved to Dublin in 1787, often thereafter identifying him as "from Dublin".

Peter initially studied for the priesthood, at Saul's Court under Father Thomas Betagh, but following the death of his mother in 1792 the family moved again, to London the following year. Peter abandoned his studies in 1794 and joined them there. He then began studies in October of that year at the Royal Academy to specifically train as a sculptor. In 1796/7 he took a study trip to Rome, a normal practice at this time, and is thought to have specifically studied Antonio Canova as his work shows much influence from Canova's style. He continued his studies on returning to London, also receiving tutorship from Peter Francis Chenu, and received his first commissions that year when Lord Heathfield asked him to sculpt busts of Sir Francis Drake and General Eliott. By 1799 he was accomplished and won the silver medal for sculpture in the class.

Turnerelli was one of the first to portray his subjects in their natural attire, rather than in classical costume, as was the convention of the age.

In 1797 (before the official end of his own studies), he had been given the enormously prestigious role as art tutor to the royal princesses, apparently at the request of Sir Thomas Lawrence and Benjamin West. In 1801 this role was elevated when he became Sculptor in Ordinary to the royal family. However, he twice refused a knighthood.

He died intestate on 20 March 1839 at his house in Newman Street, and is buried in the graveyard of St John's Chapel, St John's Wood, London.

== Family ==
His first wife Margaret Mary Tracy, bore him one son, Edward Tracy Turnerelli. He remarried in 1835 following the death of his wife. His second wife, Mary O'Connor, bore him a daughter. Edward Tracy Turnerelli (1813–96) taught English and Latin at the University of Kazan circa 1837-54 and wrote a book on Kazan.

== Works ==
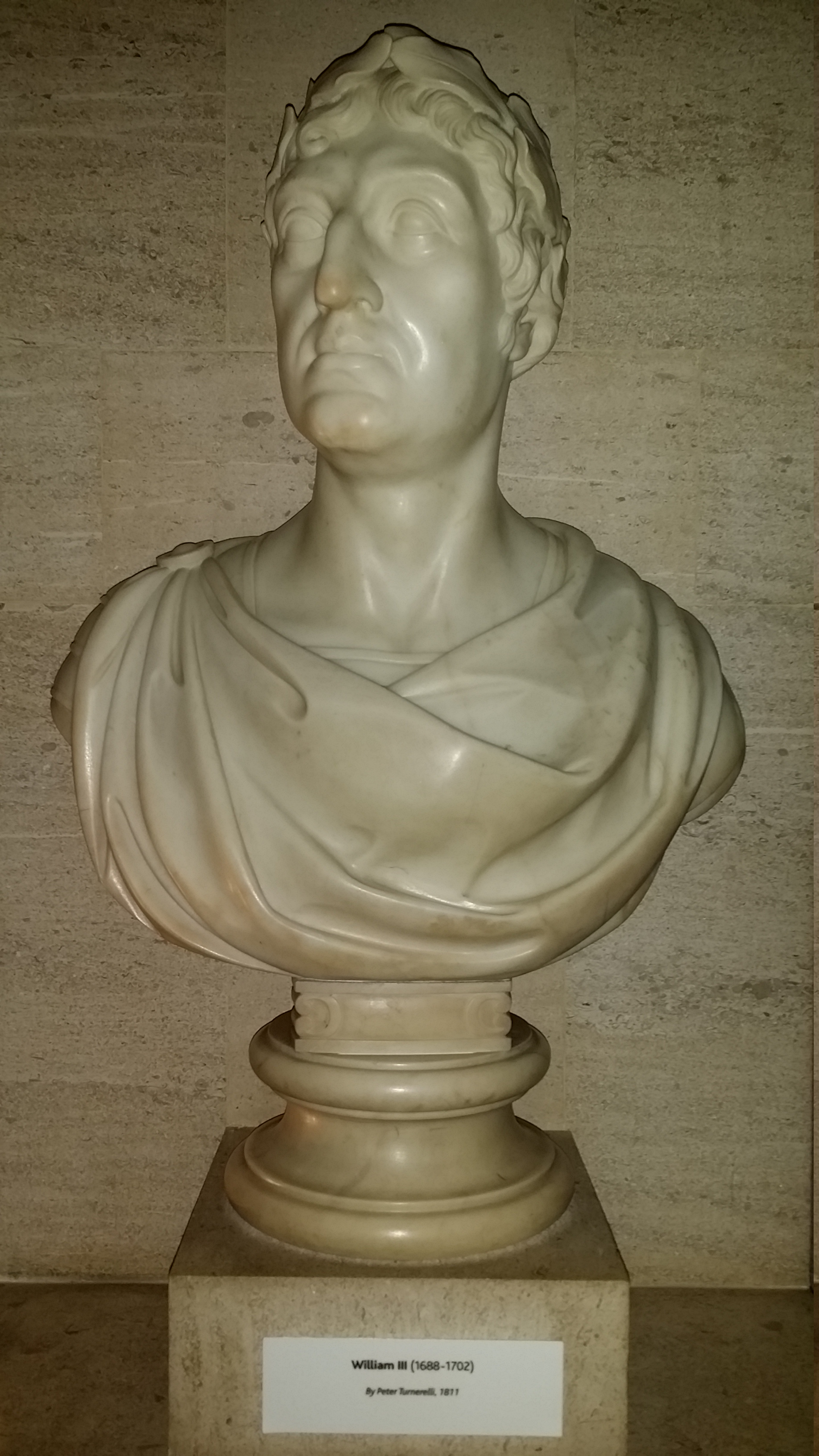
Bust of William III by Peter Turnerelli (1811) at the Bank of England Museum

- Bust of Lord Hood, 1801
- Bust of Princess Charlotte, Royal Collection, 1802
- Bust of Horatio Nelson, Town hall, Lewes, Sussex, 1805
- Bust of Viscount Melville, 1807
- Monument to Lt Col John Stuart, Canterbury Cathedral, 1808
- Bust of Colonel Aaron Burr, Vice President of America, 1809
- Jubilee Bust of George III, Windsor Castle, 1809 (at least 80 copies made from the original)
- Bust of Henry Erskine, Parliament Hall, Edinburgh, 1811
- Bust of William III, Bank of England Museum, 1811
- Bust of George III, Bank of England Museum, 1812
- Bust of Bishop Douglass, RC Chapel, Ware, Hertfordshire, 1812
- Bust of Henry Grattan, National Gallery of Ireland, 1812
- Statue of George III, King's College, London, 1813
- Bust of Sir Joseph Banks, Royal College of Surgeons, 1814 (copy in the National Maritime Museum)
- Bust of the Duke of Wellington, Guildhall, London, 1814
- Monument to John Willett, Great Canford, Dorset, 1815
- Bust of King Louis XVIII of France, 1816
- Monument to James Edwards, Harrow, Middlesex, 1816
- Monument to Bishop Moynan, Shandon, Co. Cork, 1816
- Bust of the Duke of Cumberland, Trinity College, Dublin, 1816
- Statue of Robert Burns forming the centrepiece of the Burns Monument in Dumfries, 1816
- Monument to Father Thomas Betagh (his tutor), St Michael and St John, Dublin, 1817
- Monument to John and Patrick Stirling, Dunblane Cathedral, 1818
- Statues of Saints Peter and Paul, Roman Catholic Chapel, Bath, 1819
- Bust of the Duke of Kent, Royal collection, 1820
- Monument to Admiral Sir George Hope, Westminster Abbey, 1820
- Bust of Bishop Doyle of Kildare, Carlow Cathedral, 1829
- Bust of the Queen of Portugal, 1829
- Marble altar, Marlborough Street Church, Dublin, 1830
- Bust of Daniel O'Connell, 1830, allegedly 10,000 plaster copies sold
