= Catholic Church sexual abuse cases in New Zealand =

Overview of abuse in Catholic Church in New Zealand

14% of New Zealand Catholic diocesan clergy have been accused of abuse (including physical, emotional, sexual abuse or neglect) since 1950. Several high profile cases are linked to Catholic schools.

In 2000 the church acknowledged and apologised for the abuse of children by clergy, putting in place protocols and setting up a national office to handle abuse complaints.

In the Royal Commission Enquiry into Abuse in State and Religious care, there have been 1122 complainants against individuals in the Church. In contrast are those in state care, where the numbers abused are in the tens of thousands: source

== Specific cases ==
The first recorded case was in 1900. Allegations of cruelty toward children residing at the Stoke Industrial School (also known as St Mary's Orphanage) instigated a Royal Commission and the eventual prosecution of two Marist Brothers. Edouard Forrier (Brother Wybertus) was charged with five counts of common assault. They were also charged with five counts of indecent assault of which they were acquitted. The alleged incidents occurred between September 5, 1893 and June 1, 1897.

Marist Brother Claudius Pettit, real name Malcolm Thomas Petit, was convicted of child-sex abuse of a boy at a Wellington school in the 1990s.

Father Thomas "Tom" Laffey admitted in 2003 that he had sexually assaulted Mike Phillips in the mid 1960s, when Phillips was a 13-year-old altar boy at St Mary of the Angels Church in Wellington. Laffey was ordained in 1957 and during his priesthood, he served across New Zealand and also in Fiji.

In 2018 the Society of Mary admitted that Father Francis Durning sexually abused children. Durning taught in Catholic institutions from the 1940s through to the late 1980s, among others at:

- St Bede's College, Christchurch
- Chanel College, Moamoa, in Samoa
- St Patrick's College, Silverstream, where he was Rector of the school from 1950-1955
- St Patrick's College, Kilbirnie, Wellington

In 1999, Christchurch Catholic priest Patrick Thwaites was charged with assaulting two young boys in 1984 and 1991. Father Thwaites was soon convicted and sentenced to 2 1/2 years in prison.

Marist Father Alan Woodcock abused children at St John's College in Hastings, St Patrick's College in Upper Hutt, Highden in the Manawatu and Futuna in Wellington. After he left the Marist priesthood and left New Zealand to live in England, he was extradited back to New Zealand and was convicted in 2004 of 21 sex offences committed between 1978 and 1987. The abuse continued despite the knowledge of Father Michael Curtain and Father Fred Bliss. Tracking him down abroad was done with the assistance of the Sisters of St Joseph of Nazareth. In the late 1980s, he took up residence in England, where he was arrested in 2002. Woodcock received a seven year prison sentence.

In June 2020, Kevin Healy (Brother Gordon), a former Marist brother, was convicted of four charges of indecency (from 1976-1977) between a man and boys aged 12 and 13, and one of indecency with a girl aged under 12.

John Louis Stevenson (known as Brother Bernard) and Brother Andrew Cody of the Hato Paora Māori Boys school in Feilding were convicted of sexual offenses and jailed.

In 2011 a staff member of St Bede's College, Christchurch admitted to being a sex offender before he was employed at that college, but was allowed to remain as a teacher. The same year, Brother Bede Hampton was jailed for sex abuse committed over a long time period at a Catholic school. In 2018, abuse victim advocates called for the resignation of the school's rector for continuing the staff member's employment.

In 2017 and 2018, the issue was raised of Magnus Murray, a Catholic priest, who taught at St Paul's College, Dunedin, until 1972 and was later convicted of child sexual abuse. Allegations were also made against former Christian Brothers Junior School teacher, Desmond Fay. Michael Dooley, Bishop of Dunedin, acknowledged the offences of Murray and Fay and apologised for the "suffering endured by victims and their families". Murray was laicised in 2019.

In 2018, the Otago Daily Times noted that nine Marist brothers had been convicted of crimes against boys. These were Br Charles Afeaki (Invercargill), Br Kenneth Camden (Christchurch), Br Sione Losalu (Napier), Br Bryan McKay (Hamilton), Br Andrew Cody (Feilding), Br Bernard Stevenson (Fielding), Br Bede Hampton (Masterton), Br Patrick Bignell (Hutt Valley) and Br Claudius Pettit (Lower Hutt). Another, Br Aiden Benefield, of Napier, was convicted of possessing child pornography in 2007.

== Marylands School ==
Marylands School, which was operated by the Brothers Hospitallers of St. John of God, a Catholic religious order in Christchurch, was the centre of a number of sex abuse cases. By 2006, the Australasian branch of the St John of God order had paid out $5.1 million to survivors who had been sexually abused at the school. A nonprofit trust, the Survivors of Sex Abuse Trust, worked with many of the victims. Over 120 complaints were made in regard to sexual and physical abuse alleged to have occurred at the school. Many of the offences were committed in the 1970s.

== Transfer of accused clergy to Fiji ==
On July 13, 2020, New Zealand's 1News revealed that some of the 1,300 alleged cases of child-abuse by Catholic personnel in the nation of Fiji involved clergy from New Zealand. The transfer of these persons to Fiji is a subject of Royal Commission of Inquiry into Abuse in Care. 1 News Pacific Correspondent Barbara Dreaver, who was in Fiji just before the national lockdown, spoke with some of the victims of the alleged abuse. Dr Murray Heasley from the Network of Survivors in Faith Based Institution also stated to 1 News that Fiji was a common place for the New Zealand Catholic Church to transfer accused Catholic clergy.

== Bernard McGrath ==
In addition to his sex abuse convictions in Australia, Brother Bernard McGrath is regarded as New Zealand's worst child sex abuse offender and a subject of New Zealand's Royal Commission of Inquiry into Abuse in Care. He first plead guilty to sex abuse in New Zealand in December 1993, for which received a three year prison sentence. Ordained a minister order of Brothers Hospitallers of St John of God in New Zealand, McGrath would be transferred to Australia after allegations against him at a St John of God facility in New Zealand surfaced in 1977. It has been acknowledged that he was accused committing abuse while he was employed at Marylands School. He would be forced to leave the Brothers Hospitallers of St John of God in 1997 after serving another prison sentence in Australia. In April 2006, McGrath received 21 guilty verdicts and pleaded guilty to one charge of sexually abusing boys while he was at Marylands.

== See also ==
Sexual abuse cases in the Catholic church

- Catholic Church sex abuse cases
- Catholic abuse
- Catholic Church sex abuse cases by country
- Catholic Church sex abuse cases in Australia
- Catholic Church sex abuse cases in Belgium
- Catholic Church sexual abuse cases in Canada
- Catholic Church sexual abuse cases in Dublin
- Catholic Church sex abuse cases in English Benedictine Congregation
- Catholic Church sexual abuse cases in Ireland
- Catholic Church sex abuse cases in the United States
- William Kamm, leader of schismatic Catholic group convicted for sexual abuse

Critique & consequences related topics

- Criticism of Pope John Paul II
- Debate on the causes of clerical child abuse
- Ecclesiastical response to Catholic sex abuse cases
- Instruction Concerning the Criteria for the Discernment of Vocations with Regard to Persons with Homosexual Tendencies in View of Their Admission to the Seminary and to Holy Orders
- Media coverage of Catholic sex abuse cases
- Settlements and bankruptcies in Catholic sex abuse cases
- Sex Crimes and the Vatican, BBC documentary
- Survivors Network of those Abused by Priests, NGO for victims in USA

Investigation, prevention and victim support related topics

- Broken Rites Australia, support and advocacy group in Australia
- National Review Board, USA
- National Society for the Prevention of Cruelty to Children, UK
- Pontifical Commission for the Protection of Minors
- Sexual Addiction & Compulsivity, peer-reviewed journal on prevention & treatment
- Virtus (program), church initiative in USA
- Vos estis lux mundi, church procedure for abuse cases

Other related topics

- Child sexual abuse
- Clerical celibacy
- Homosexual clergy in the Catholic Church
- Paraphilia
- Pontifical secret
- Religious abuse
- Spiritual abuse
- Roman Catholicism in New Zealand
