= Media coverage of Catholic sexual abuse cases =

The media coverage of Catholic sex abuse cases is a major aspect of the academic literature surrounding the pederastic priest scandal.

== Earliest media coverage ==
- In 1988, NBC Nightly News with Tom Brokaw aired "Sins of the Fathers", the first nationally-broadcast report on Roman Catholic priests who sexually molest children. In his lead-in describing this "serious and embarrassing problem", Brokaw advised viewers "It's not widespread, but it does exist."

== Extent of media coverage ==
According to a study conducted jointly by the Project for Excellence in Journalism and the Pew Forum on Religion & Public Life, both of which belong to the nonprofit, nonpartisan Pew Research Center in Washington, D.C.:

- In 2002, when a Boston Globe series began a critical mass of news reports, the coverage mostly emanated from the United States. In 2010, however, much of the reporting focused on child abuse in Europe, with English-language European newspapers publishing three times as many articles on the scandal as U.S. papers.
- The sheer amount of coverage this year came close but fell slightly short of 2002. ("A Nexis keyword search of 90 media outlets found 1,559 stories mentioning the scandal in the first four months of 2010, just 77 fewer articles than in a similar four-month period in mid-2002.)"
- From mid-March (when the pope's role in a decades-old abuse case in Germany came under scrutiny) through late April, clergy sexual abuse was the eighth biggest story in the mainstream media, beating out coverage of nuclear weapons policy and the Tea Party movement.
- The scandal found little traction in new media, however. Across the millions of blogs and Twitter posts tracked in PEJ's weekly monitoring, the clergy abuse scandal registered as a leading topic in only one of the six weeks analyzed.
- Pope Benedict XVI was by far the biggest news maker, featured in 51.6% of the stories about the scandal in the mainstream U.S. media (including print, radio, network television, cable TV and online news sources) during the six-week period from March 12 through April 27.
- All other individual figures combined, including cardinals, bishops and priests, appeared as lead newsmakers in just 12% of the stories.
- An examination of three Catholic news outlets reveals wide differences in their approaches. The National Catholic Reporter, an independent weekly, devoted fully two-thirds (66.7%) of its Vatican coverage to the scandal. Two Catholic news services, on the other hand, devoted considerably less of their Vatican coverage to the story. Catholic News Service gave it 44.8%, and the Catholic News Agency gave it 33.3%.
- Among the religion blogs published by high-circulation U.S. newspapers, those operated by USA Today and The Washington Post contained the most entries on the clergy abuse scandal - a total of 12 each during the six weeks studied.

=== Boston Globe coverage ===
However, it was not until early 2002 that the Boston Globe coverage of a series of criminal prosecutions of five Roman Catholic priests thrust the issue of sexual abuse of minors by Catholic priests into the national limelight on an ongoing basis. The coverage of these cases encouraged other victims to come forward with their allegations of abuse resulting in more lawsuits and criminal cases.

In a May 2002 interview with the Italian Catholic publication, 30 Giorni, Cardinal Oscar Maradiaga claimed that Jews influenced the Boston Globe to exploit the recent controversy regarding sexual abuse by Catholic priests in order to divert attention from the Israeli-Palestinian crisis. This provoked outrage from the Anti-Defamation League, especially since Maradiaga had a reputation as a moderate and was regarded as a papabile.

Before the Boston Globe coverage of the sexual abuse scandal in the Boston archdiocese, handling of sexual abuse allegations was largely left up to the discretion of individual bishops. After the number of allegations exploded following the Globe's series of articles, U.S. bishops felt compelled to formulate a coordinated response at the episcopal conference level.

In addition to matters regarding priests, the Boston Globe also reported in 2002 on matters with church staff, including a pastoral care and CCD worker, Paul Merullo, and a teenager, in Woburn, Massachusetts, which had occurred in 2000 but only made public in 2001. Merullo was sentenced to two and a half years in prison.

In 2003, the series of articles in the Boston Globe received a Pulitzer Prize for Public Service. The Globe was honored, according to the Pulitzer website, "for its courageous, comprehensive coverage ... an effort that pierced secrecy, stirred local, national and international reaction and produced changes in the Roman Catholic Church."

== Criticisms of media coverage ==
=== United States ===
On March 24, 2010, a report by The New York Times cited the Fr. Murphy case to accuse Pope Benedict XVI of a cover-up while he was head of the CDF in 1996.

However, Father Thomas Brundage, judicial vicar who presided at the Church's internal discipline trial of the case stated that even though his name and comments had been liberally and often inaccurately quoted in The New York Times and more than 100 other newspapers and on-line periodicals, he had never once been contacted by any news organization for comment. He added that "Pope Benedict XVI has done more than any other pope or bishop in history to rid the Catholic Church of the scourge of child sexual abuse and provide for those who have been injured...on the day that Father Murphy died, he was still the defendant in a church criminal trial."

It was also claimed that The New York Times article used an incorrect translation of the document on which it based its claims. Paolo Rodari of the Italian newspaper Il Foglio, wrote: "The computer-generated English version would support the NYT's allegations against Bertone and Ratzinger, but that same conclusion is not possible if a correct review of the sources is done." He added that in the official Italian text written by the CDF, it is explained that either Fr. Murphy gives ‘clear signs of repentance’ or the canonical process will go to the end, including his dismissal from the clerical state. But in the English version used by the NYT, not only were some passages omitted, but frequently the contrary was said.

Director of Apologetics and Evangelization for Catholic Answers, Jimmy Akin, also pointed out, "Back in 1996 the CDF did not have a mandate to handle cases of sexual abuse by priests... The reason that Weakland notified the CDF was not because the abuse of minors was involved but because the abuse of the sacrament of confession was involved."

In April 2010, there were reports of a letter signed by Cardinal Ratzinger in 1985, in which he allegedly dismissed a request to laicize a Father Stephen Kiesle, a California priest accused of molesting boys. The Vatican responded that "...the letter followed a request from the priest himself for laicization, supported by the bishop. As such it was not a punishment, or part of a canonical process or the civil trial. At this stage, Father Kiesle was already dismissed from pastoral duties during the investigation, and he had no contact with any parishioners or children." The Pope's involvement with the 1985 letter has been covered in a two-part feature by the BBC.

The Australian transport planning academic Paul Mees wrote, "Why did Ratzinger need to consider the request, Dawkins asks? And why didn’t he report Kiesle to the police? The answer is that Kiesle had already been reported to the police, convicted and sentenced. After completing his sentence, Kiesle left the priesthood and wrote to the CDF asking to be formally defrocked. Every year, some of the church's 410,000 priests quit."

Law professor John Coverdale, in a letter to The New York Times, wrote, "The [Laurie Goodstein] story is so wrong that it is hard to believe it is not animated by the anti-Catholic animus that the New York Times and other media outlets deny harboring... My complaint here is not that the article misuses the word "defrock" but rather that by so doing it strongly suggests to readers that Cardinal Ratzinger delayed the priest's removal from the ministry. Delaying laicization had nothing to do with allowing him to continue exercising the ministry, from which he had already been suspended. Not only does the article fail to make these distinctions, it positively misstate the facts. Its title is "Pope Put off Move to Punish Abusive Priest.""

=== United Kingdom ===
A documentary entitled Sex Crimes and the Vatican, produced by a victim of clerical sex abuse for the BBC in 2006, included the claim that all allegations of sex abuse are to be sent to the Vatican rather than the civil authorities, and that "a secret church decree called Crimen sollicitationis ... imposes the strictest oath of secrecy on the child victim, the priest dealing with the allegation, and any witnesses. Breaking that oath means instant banishment from the Catholic Church - excommunication."

However, John L. Allen Jr. noted that three points had been established about Crimen sollicitationis since the airing of Worcester Telegram and Gazette in July 2003:

- The document was exceedingly obscure. Most canon lawyers and bishops had never heard of it prior to the controversy in 2003, so to suggest it played a crucial role in shaping the church's response to the crisis is an exaggeration.
- As an "instruction", the document's legal force expired in 1983 with the revision of the Code of Canon Law. Canon 1395,§2 explicitly named sex with a minor by clerics as a canonical crime "to be punished with just penalties, not excluding dismissal from the clerical state if the case so warrants".
- The document, written explicitly for solicitation in relation to confession, was concerned only with secrecy in internal ecclesiastical procedures. There was nothing in it, nor anywhere else in church law, that would have prevented a bishop (or anyone else) from reporting a crime of sexual abuse to the local police or a prosecuting attorney.

Canon lawyers also told National Catholic Reporter that the high degree of secrecy in Crimen Sollicitationis was related to the fact that it dealt with the confessional. Secrecy in canonical cases serves three purposes:

1. It is designed to allow witnesses and other parties to speak freely, knowing that their responses will be confidential.
2. It allows the accused party to protect his good name until guilt is established.
3. It allows victims to come forward without exposing themselves to publicity.

== Coverage in literature and films ==
=== Books ===
A number of books have been written about the abuse suffered from priests and nuns including Andrew Madden in Altar Boy: A Story of Life After Abuse, Carolyn Lehman's Strong at the Heart: How it feels to heal from sexual abuse and the bestselling Kathy's Story by Kathy O'Beirne, which details physical and sexual abuse suffered in a Magdalene laundry in Ireland. Ed West of The Daily Telegraph claimed Kathy Beirne's story was "largely invented", according to a book by Hermann Kelly, a Derry-born Irish Daily Mail journalist and former editor of The Irish Catholic.

Jose Rizal described the sexual abuses of the Church in his novels Noli Me Tangere and El Filibusterismo by portraying friars like Fray Damaso, Fray Salvi and Fray Cammora as sexual deviants, the former fathered a child, the latter two raped women, particularly a nun.

=== Films ===
Many films have been made about sex abuse within the Church, including:

- The Boys of St. Vincent (1992)
- The Magdalene Sisters (2002)
- Song for a Raggy Boy (2003)
- Bad Education (2004), directed by Pedro Almodóvar.
- Twist of Faith (2004), an HBO film
- Our Fathers (2005), a Showtime movie based on the book by David France
- Holy Water-Gate: Abuse Cover-up in the Catholic Church (2005)
- Deliver Us From Evil (2006)
- Hand of God (2006), documentary filmed for Frontline
- Sex Crimes and the Vatican (2006), documentary filmed for the BBC Panorama documentary series that purports to show how the Vatican has used Crimen sollicitationis to silence allegations of sexual abuse by priests.
- Doubt (2008), based on the eponymous play
- Mea Maxima Culpa: Silence in the House of God (2012)
- Spotlight (2015)
- By the Grace of God (2019)

More films and documentaries

== See also ==
Sexual abuse cases in the Catholic church

- Catholic Church sex abuse cases
- Catholic abuse
- Catholic Church sex abuse cases by country
- Catholic Church sex abuse cases in Australia
- Catholic Church sex abuse cases in Belgium
- Catholic Church sexual abuse cases in Canada
- Catholic Church sexual abuse cases in Dublin
- Catholic Church sex abuse cases in English Benedictine Congregation
- Catholic Church sexual abuse cases in Ireland
- Catholic sexual abuse cases in New Zealand
- Catholic Church sex abuse cases in the United States
- William Kamm, leader of a schismatic Catholic group convicted for sexual abuse

Critique and consequences related topics

- Criticism of Pope John Paul II
- Debate on the causes of clerical child abuse
- Ecclesiastical response to Catholic sex abuse cases
- Instruction Concerning the Criteria for the Discernment of Vocations with Regard to Persons with Homosexual Tendencies in View of Their Admission to the Seminary and to Holy Orders
- Settlements and bankruptcies in Catholic sex abuse cases
- Sex Crimes and the Vatican, BBC documentary
- Survivors Network of those Abused by Priests, NGO for victims in USA

Investigation, prevention, and victim support related topics

- Anti-Catholicism in literature and media
- Broken Rites Australia, support and advocacy group in Australia
- Charter for the Protection of Children and Young People, USA
- John Jay Report
- National Review Board, USA
- National Society for the Prevention of Cruelty to Children, UK
- Pontifical Commission for the Protection of Minors, Vetican
- Sexual Addiction & Compulsivity, peer-reviewed journal on prevention & treatment
- Survivors Network of those Abused by Priests, USA
- Virtus (program), church initiative in USA
- Vos estis lux mundi, church procedure for abuse vases

Other related topics

- Child sexual abuse
- Clerical celibacy
- Homosexual clergy in the Catholic Church
- Paraphilia
- Pontifical secret
- Religious abuse
- Spiritual abuse
