= Catholic Church sexual abuse cases by country =

Sexual abuse cases involving the Catholic Church by Country

Investigations and widespread reporting of sexual abuse scandals were conducted in the early 21st century related to numerous dioceses in the United States of America; several American dioceses have filed for bankruptcy after settling civil lawsuits from victims. In addition, Catholic Church sexual abuse cases in Europe have been documented in several dioceses in European nations. The United Nations Committee on the Rights of the Child (CRC) has criticized the Holy See’s worldwide handling of child sexual abuse cases, noting systemic failures in protection, accountability, and implementation of the Convention across its global institutions.

In 2001, lawsuits were filed in the United States and Ireland alleging that some priests had sexually abused minors and that their superiors had conspired to conceal and otherwise abet their criminal misconduct. Victims themselves often conceal the names and acts of the priests who abused them, due to lifelong shame surrounding such treatment. John Jay Report tabulated a total of 4,392 priests and deacons in the U.S. against whom allegations of sexual abuse had been made. The numbers of reported abuse allegations and court cases have increased worldwide since then.

The CRC has asked the Vatican for detailed information on the full extent of child abuse worldwide by priests, monks and nuns. They have also asked how the Holy See prevents abusers from contacting additional children and how they ensure that known crimes against children are reported to the police. In the past, there were issues with the church hierarchy failing to report abuse to law enforcement and allowing abusers further contact with children. November 1st 2013 was set as a deadline for the CRC to receive the information. In June 2021, a team of U.N. special rapporteurs for the Office of the High Commissioner for Human Rights criticized the Vatican, because of the persistent allegations that the Catholic Church is obstructing and not cooperating with domestic judicial proceedings in order to deny accountability for the abusers and compensation for the victims.

== Prevalence ==
In a statement read by Archbishop Silvano Maria Tomasi in September of 2009, the Holy See stated, "We know now that in the last 50 years somewhere between 1.5% and 5% of the Catholic clergy has been involved in sexual abuse cases", adding that this figure was comparable to that of other groups and denominations. A 2010 article in Newsweek magazine reported that the figure for abuse of children by adults in the Catholic Church was similar to that in the general adult population. However, due to the reluctance of victims to name their abusers, in childhood or decades later--especially in cases where abusers wield religious authority--these statistics are likely inaccurate.

A Perspective on Clergy Sexual Abuse by Dr. Thomas Plante, of the Catholic Santa Clara University and volunteer clinical associate professor at Stanford University, states that "approximately 4% of priests during the past half century (and mostly in the 1960s and 1970s) have had a sexual experience with a minor", which "is consistent with male clergy from other religious traditions and is significantly lower than the general adult male population which may double these numbers". Plante's article was based on a study done by John Jay College. It was compiled from data provided by leaders of U.S. Conference of Catholic Bishops, who paid John Jay College to do the study.

After widespread publicity about the abuse, in 2013 Barbara Blaine, of the Survivors Network of those Abused by Priests (SNAP), stated, "We are confident that the ICC will see sufficient evidence that high ranking Catholic officials are still knowingly enabling predators to harm and endanger children across the world, while concealing these heinous crimes even more effectively." A group had filed charges in the International Criminal Court (ICC) against the Catholic Church for what it said was crimes against humanity because of its policy on this issue. The ICC refused to investigate. SNAP representatives note that most Catholics are found in the Third World, where child molestation is more easily concealed. They argued that it was necessary to guard against "the tempting assumption that the worst of this scandal is somehow behind us."

== Africa ==
=== Kenya ===
In 2009 several people accused an Italian priest, Renato Kizito Sesana, of sexual molestation. The Catholic Church assured them it was investigating the case, but that did not appear to happen. Kenyan police said they found no evidence and believed Sesana was innocent.

In 2010, a young Kenyan woman alleged that a Catholic priest had raped her, but the police and church authorities failed to follow up the allegations.

The 2011 Raidió Teilifís Éireann (RTÉ) documentary A Mission To Prey publicized Kenya's clerical abuse cases, saying they should have been handled with more transparency. It was discovered that this programme mistakenly alleged that Kevin Reynolds was an abuser, causing him to be removed from his home and his parish ministry. RTÉ subsequently apologized for this programme. It has since stated that Reynolds is innocent of the charges. RTÉ has allowed continued access to this programme online, while upwards of 32 slander and libel cases are pending in reaction by alleged abusers.

In 2011, a Dutch bishop in Kenya was reported to be under probe over alleged sex abuse. He was alleged to have abused a minor 18 years before while serving as a priest in Ngong diocese. He was retired by the church.

=== Mauritius ===
Henry Coombes revealed that he was sexually assaulted at the age of 11 in the late 1950s by a Catholic priest from Ireland who was posted at Saint Joseph's College in Curepipe.

In September 2016, Teddy Labour, a 37-year old Catholic priest, was arrested following complaints made to church officials Hériberto Cabrera and Jean-Maurice Labour by a 20-year old church goer. She had attended St. Louis Cathedral, Port-Louis where its priest kissed and molested her.

In October 2019, Catholic priest Joseph-Marie Moctee was sentenced to 3 years in jail for molesting a 15-year old teenager at Cure de St Anne, a Catholic church located at Chamarel in April 2015. Joseph-Marie Moctee had convinced the teenager and his friend to have dinner with him and to stay overnight at the church.

=== Tanzania ===
St Michael's Catholic Boarding School, Soni, Tanzania

Kit Cunningham, a prominent United Kingdom member of the Rosminian order, and three other priests, were exposed as pedophiles after Cunningham's death. While at Soni, Cunningham committed sexual abuse that made the school, according to one pupil, "a loveless, violent and sad hellhole". Other pupils recall being photographed naked, hauled out of bed at night to have their genitals fondled, and other sexual abuse. Although known about by the Rosminians before Cunningham's death in 2010, the abuse was not reported by the media until 2011. Formal action was launched by a group of former pupils who filed a civil suit at the civil court in Leicester, on 20 March 2013.

Settlement

The audited financial statements for the year ending 5 April 2015 report titled Legal and safeguarding related costs stated that the charity was liable also for the claimants' legal fees. The matter has had a significant impact on the charity's finances with payment of their legal and settlement costs amounting to a total GBP 1,746,523.00 for the year.

== Asia ==
=== East Timor ===
In November 2018, the Vatican defrocked American priest Richard Daschbach after the church found him guilty of sexual abuse of girls in the shelter he had established. In September 2020, East Timor's public prosecutor charged Daschbach with 14 counts of sexual abuse, pornographic material and domestic violence. On 22 February 2021, the trial against Daschbach started in East Timor. On 21 December 2021, Dashbach was found guilty of the sexual abuse of four female children and subsequently was sentenced to 12 years in prison.

=== Japan ===
Between 2002 and 2012, at least five damage reports had been filed over clergy sexual abuse.

=== Philippines ===
- In 2002, the Catholic Church apologised for sexual abuses, including adultery, homosexuality and child abuse by 200 priests over the previous 20 years.
- In 2003, at least 34 priests were suspended in a sex abuse scandal involving sexual harassment of women. Twenty men were from a single diocese.
- In 2011, a priest accused of sexually abusing a 17-year-old female minor was sheltered by his bishop, despite calls for his surrender to civil authorities.
- In 2017, a priest was arrested in Marikina for attempting to have sex with a 13-year-old girl.
- In 2018, an American priest, who was assigned in the Philippines, was arrested for sexually abusing at least 10 young boys residing in Naval, Biliran.
- In 2019, a parish priest in Cadiz City, Negros Occidental was charged of rape for molesting a 4-year-old girl.
- In 2022, a priest was arrested in Tuguegarao City for sexually abusing a 16-year-old girl.
- In March 2023, a 62-year-old priest of the Diocese of San Carlos in Iloilo was arrested on charges of raping a 17-year-old choir girl in 2022.
- On 10 May 2023, a priest of the Diocese of Borongan was accused and removed by Pope Francis for sexually abusing minors.

=== India ===
- In 2002, Mathew N. Schmalz noted that Catholic Church sexual abuse cases in India are generally not spoken about openly, stating "you would have gossip and rumours, but it never reaches the level of formal charges or controversies."
- In 2014, Raju Kokkan, the vicar of the Saint Paul's Church in Thaikkattussery, Thrissur, Kerala, was arrested on charges of raping a nine-year-old girl. According to Kerala Police, Kokkan had raped the child on several different occasions, including at least three times in his office during the month of April. Kokkan promised to gift the child expensive vestments for her Holy Communion ceremony before sexually assaulting her. The abuse was revealed after the victim informed her parents that she had been raped by Kokkan on 25 April 2014. The priest subsequently fled to Nagercoil in the neighbouring state of Tamil Nadu and was arrested by police on 5 May. Following the arrest, the Thrissur Archdiocese stated that the vicar had been removed from his position within the church. Between February and April 2014, three other Catholic priests were arrested in the state of Kerala on charges of raping minors.
- In 2016, the Catholic Church reappointed a convicted and jailed priest in the Ootacamund Diocese in Tamil Nadu, with no additional measures for victim or child safety.
- In 2017, Robin or Mathew Vadakkancheril of St Sebastian church in Kannur was arrested in Kochi on the charge of repeatedly raping a 15-year-old girl who later gave birth to a child. The baby is reported to have been taken to an orphanage without the mother's consent. In 2019, he was sentenced to 20 years in prison by the Thalassery POSCO court.
- In 2018, after much public outcry, Bishop Franco Mulakkal was arrested on 21 September by the Kerala Police. The Holy See had just 'temporarily' relieved him from his pastoral responsibilities. The nun who complained against Bishop Franco had mentioned to the police that he had repeatedly had unnatural sex with her on multiple occasions between 2014 and 2016.

=== Indonesia ===
Between 2002 and 2020, 20 altar boys were abused by Syahril Parlindungan Marbun, although, as said by Police Chief Aziz Andriansyah, the number could be even higher.

== Europe ==
=== Austria ===
Archdiocese of Vienna

In 1995, Hans Hermann Cardinal Groer stepped down as head of the Catholic Church in Austria following accusations of sexual misconduct. In 1998 he left the country and lost the duties of a Cardinal. Nevertheless, he still retained the title of a Cardinal.

Kremsmuenster Abbey

In March 2010, several monks were suspended at Kremsmunster Abbey, located in the Upper Austria city of Kremsmunster, for severe allegations of sexual abuse and physical violence. The reported incidents ranged over a period from the 1970s until the late 1990s and had been subject to police investigation. In July 2013 an Austrian court found Kremsmuenster Abbey director Alfons Mandorfer guilty in 24 documented cases of child abuse and sexual violence. The now laicised priest, who was accused of committing "sexual acts of differing intensity" on the pupils between 1973 and 1993, was sentenced to twelve years in prison. By 2013, the school had paid approximately €700,000 in compensation.

=== Belgium ===
There have been several abuse cases in Belgium.

Diocese of Antwerp

Former parish priest Bruno Vos of Nieuwmoer parish in Kalmthout was officially charged with rape of a minor by the Belgian judiciary. He was also alleged to possess child pornography.

=== Croatia ===
- Ivan Čuček was convicted in 2000 of sexual abuse of 37 young girls and sentenced to three years in prison. This term was later reduced by the Supreme Court to one-and-a-half years.
- Drago Ljubičić, a Catholic priest on the isle of Rab, was convicted and sentenced to three years in prison for molesting five teenage boys. He will be the first Catholic priest in Croatia to serve prison time for sexual abuse. When asked by Catholic press agency Glas Koncila (prior to scandal) why children avoid going to church, he blamed the 'strong influence of communism on island Rab'.
- Nediljko Ivanov, former vicar of Bibinje, is the first priest in Croatia convicted of pedophilia by a church court. Ivanov was first suspected in 2012 when four of his victims reported him to the State's Attorney Office for pedophile activities that occurred from 1983 to 1991. Ivanov was not prosecuted in a civilian court due to statute of limitations of legally prescribed 15 years, because cases were reported in 2012, six years after the statute of limitations went into power. Congregation for the Doctrine of the Faith was also informed about the case, but did not use its authority to remove the priest from the church. The church court ruled that Ivanov can still serve Mass, but was sentenced to fasting, prayer and was ordered to apologise to the victims that he sexually abused. One of the victims stated in 2014 that he finds the judgment satisfactory because everyone know about Ivanov being a pedophile, but he does not consider sentence to be fair. Ivanov lives in a home for retired priests in Zadar.

=== France ===
Henri Lebras was sentenced to ten years for the rape of a twelve-year-old boy between 1995 and 1998.

In February 2019, Pope Francis alluded to the closure of a religious order due to the 'sexual slavery' of the nuns within it. Some sources identify the congregation he intended as a part of the Community of St. Jean. The Holy See's Press Office however claimed that "sexual manipulation had occurred within this women’s religious congregation, not actual sex slavery." On 3 June 2019, the French Catholic Church activated a sex abuse commission—made up of 22 legal professionals, doctors, historians, sociologists and theologians—which will obtain witness statements and deliver its conclusions by the end of 2020. In June 2020, the Independent Commission on Sexual Abuse in the Church (CIASE), which was established in June 2019, concluded that 3,000 children in France were sexually abused by Catholic clergy and officials since 1950 and that there was an average of 40 victims per year. On 11 November 2020, Jean-Marc Sauve, the head of the independent commission set up by the Catholic Church in France to investigate claims of sex abuse, acknowledged his commission's sex abuse hotline, which closed on 31 October 2020, received 6,500 calls reporting sex abuse in a period 17 months.

A 2,500-page report was to be published in October 2021; the head of the independent commission investigating child sexual abuse in the French Catholic Church said that about 3,000 paedophiles, as a minimum estimate, had operated in the church since 1950, with at least 330,000 children sexually abused. Pope Francis said that he was shamed by the church's failure to deal with paedophile priests in France. Young girls abused by nuns were not an infrequent occurrence, either.

Abbé Pierre, founder of the Emmaüs movement and a revered French priest, has been posthumously accused of sexual misconduct spanning from the 1950s to the 2000s. In July 2024, an internal report by Emmaüs International detailed allegations from seven women, including one minor, who reported sexual assault and harassment between the late 1970s and 2005. Subsequent investigations uncovered additional testimonies, bringing the total to 24 women. These accounts describe a pattern of abuse, with incidents occurring across various countries. Despite these revelations, the Paris prosecutor's office declined to initiate a formal inquiry, citing Abbé Pierre's death in 2007 and the expiration of the statute of limitations for potential charges. Pope Francis acknowledged the Vatican's longstanding awareness of Abbé Pierre's actions, emphasising the need for transparency and accountability. The French Catholic Church has called for judicial investigations to fully uncover the extent of the abuses and address potential systemic failures.

=== Germany ===
In February 2010, Der Spiegel reported that more than 94 clerics and laymen have been suspected of sexual abuse since 1995. Thirty of them had been prosecuted because legal time constraints related to the occurrence of alleged crimes prevented prosecution of older cases. In 2017, it was further reported that at least 547 members of the prestigious Domspatzen choir in Regensburg were physically or sexually abused between 1945 and 1992.

On 25 September 2018, the German Catholic Bishops' Conference released a report (some data of which was leaked via Der Spiegel several days before its official publication) that reported that 3,677 children in Germany, mostly boys under age 13, were sexually abused by Catholic clergy members over the past seven decades". About 1,670 church workers, or 4.4% of the clergy, had been involved in the abuse which is "shocking and probably just the tip of the iceberg" according to Germany's Federal Justice Minister Katarina Barley. The report, commissioned by the Bishops' Conference in 2014, was not fully independent of the church and likely understated the activity, as journalists have been forbidden from looking at church files which could contain more reports of abuse. The full report was officially released by the German Catholic Church on 25 September, and included an apology by Cardinal Reinhard Marx, Bishop of Munich and Freising and head of the German Catholic Bishops' Conference, and other German bishops. The incidents were reported to have happened between the years 1946 and 2014. The report's author criticised the church for denying him access to other Catholic institutions, including children's homes and schools, which could consequently not be included. It was also reported that local dioceses destroyed some files containing more reports of sexual abuse. Some of the "predator priests" were transferred to other parishes in order to avoid scrutiny.

In August 2020, more than 1,400 people in Germany accused at least 654 monks, nuns and other members of the orders of sexually abusing them as children, teenagers, and as wards, going as far back as the 1950s. In December 2020, Catholic nuns who ran a former children's home in the German city of Speyer were implicated in transporting children to priests who would then sex abuse them.

GottesSuche, a German nonprofit organization with the goal of researching and documenting abuse in both the Catholic and Protestant Churches, has a frequently updated sourced timeline of cases, international but focused on Germany.

According to a February 2021 report in The Daily Beast, nuns from a convent in Speyer rented orphaned boys to German businessmen who forced them to participate in gang bangs and sex orgies. The nuns later punished the young boys if they were covered in semen or had wrinkled clothing.

=== Ireland ===
In August 2018, a list was published which revealed that over 1,300 Catholic clergy in Ireland had been accused of sexual abuse, with 82 of them getting convicted.

Archdiocese of Dublin

Several priests convicted of abusing children in the United States were Irish nationals, notably Patrick Colleary, Anthony O'Connell and Oliver O'Grady. One of the most widely known cases of sexual abuse in Ireland involved Brendan Smyth, who, between 1945 and 1989, sexually abused and assaulted 20 children in parishes in Belfast, Dublin and the United States.

Catholic Boy Scouts of Ireland

In May 2020, it was revealed that prior to the 2004 merger with the SAI which formed Scouting Ireland, Catholic Boy Scouts of Ireland covered up sex abuse committed by people who served in the organisation. In a period spanning decades, both the CBSI and SAI shielded 275 known or suspected predators who abused children after becoming aware of the reported acts of abuse. Scouting Ireland backed the findings of the report and issued an apology.

Diocese of Ferns

The Ferns Inquiry 2005 – On 22 October 2005 a government-commissioned report compiled by a former Irish Supreme Court judge delivered an indictment of the handling of clerical sex abuse in the Irish diocese of Ferns.

=== Italy ===
The Italian Government has a treaty with the Vatican that guarantees areas of immunity to Vatican officials, including bishops and priests. This has reportedly made it difficult to get accurate figures as to how many priests and other religious officials are alleged to have committed sexual abuse. In October 2018, however, Italian victim rights group Rete l'Abuso asserting that the Italian justice system has treated about 300 cases of predator priests and nuns and netted 150–170 convictions since the year 2000.

Three former students claimed in 2010 that they had been abused, and 65 former students signed statements saying that they or other students had been abused by Catholic priests when attending the Antonio Provolo Institute for the Deaf, a Catholic school for deaf children in Verona, Italy. The abuse, reportedly by 24 priests including the late bishop of Verona, is alleged to have occurred from the 1950s to 1980s.

Former Roman Rota judge Pietro Amenta was taken into police custody in March 2017. In February 2018 he pleaded guilty to possession of child pornography and was sentenced to 14 months' imprisonment, suspended.

In Italy as of late 2021 the issue of Catholic sexual abuse had been largely buried. Following an investigation which found thousands of perpetrators and hundreds of thousands of victims in France, there were calls for the church to "find the courage to investigate" clerical child abuse in other countries, including specifically Italy. Hans Zollner, a German priest and adviser to Pope Francis, said "The Catholic church in other countries must now find the same courage as in France. I hope in Italy too. The church is not immaculate, unfortunately it is also made up of sin and crimes."

=== Malta ===
Eighty-four allegations had been made as of April 2010. Lawrence Grech, one of many alleged victims, complained that he was abused in an orphanage. Grech complained in 2010 that the Catholic Church had been investigating cases for seven years without doing enough that is effective. The pope spoke personally to Grech and other victims, praising their courage in coming forward. A Maltese court found that Charles Pulis and Godwin Scerri sexually abused children, and sentenced the two men to six years and five years in prison, respectively. The church officially regretted the delays before investigations; it promised to remove Pulis from the priesthood.

Anthony Mercieca, who was accused by former Florida Congressman Mark Foley of molesting him as a teenager and has admitted "inappropriate encounters", now lives in Malta. In year 2020 Donald Bellizzi was sentenced to three years in prison for sexually abusing a teenage boy.

=== Monaco ===
On 3 December 2020, William McCandless, a member of the Wilmington, Delaware-based religious order Oblates de St. Francis De Sales who was formerly assigned to DeSales University in Lehigh County, Pennsylvania, was charged in Philadelphia, Pennsylvania, for possession of child pornography. He also served as an adviser to Monaco’s royal family, Grace Kelly, the late mother of Monaco's leader Prince Albert, was also a native of Philadelphia. Much of McCandless' child pornography was imported from overseas as well. McCandless has been ordered to remain under house arrest until the outcome of his trial.

=== Netherlands ===
Since 1995, the church established new procedures to receive reports of sexual abuse. Alleged victims can notify a central church institution, called Secretariaat Rooms-Katholiek Kerkgenootschap (SRRK). The church made this change in response to charges of alleged cases of sexual abuse by religious members of the Roman Catholic Church.

On 14 May 1998, damages of €56,800 were paid by the diocese of Rotterdam to the victim of sexual abuse by a diocesan priest; this was part of a settlement to avoid civil prosecution.

J. Ceelen, pastor of the parishes of Lieshout and of Mariahout (municipality of Laarbeek), quit his post after allegations of sexual abuse on 1 September 2005.

In February 2010, Salesians were accused of sexual abuse in their juvenate Don Rua in 's-Heerenberg. Salesian bishop of Rotterdam van Luyn pleaded for a thorough investigation.

In 2011, the Deetman Commission, acting on the 2010 request of the Conference of Bishops and the Dutch Religious Conference, reported on its inquiry into abuse cases from 1945 to 2010 affecting children entrusted to the care of the church in the Netherlands.

=== Norway ===
Georg Müller, a former Catholic bishop in Trondheim, Norway, has admitted to sexually abusing an altar boy in the 1980s when he served as a priest there. Müller, who retired as bishop in 2009, said there were no other victims.

=== Poland ===
In 2013, a succession of child sex abuse scandals within the church, and the poor response by the church, became a matter of widespread public concern. The church resisted demands to pay compensation to victims. On 27 September 2018, however, Bishop Romuald Kamiński of the Diocese of Warsaw-Praga stated that Polish church leaders were working on a document, to be published later, on priestly sexual abuse of minors in Poland, and ways to prevent it. Cases were being evaluated by Warsaw courts, and the priests involved were banned from working with minors; three were suspended from all pastoral work. According to Archbishop Wojciech Polak, the head of Poland's Catholic Church, the document will include data on the scale of priestly sex abuse in Poland.

On 8 October 2018, a victims group mapped out 255 cases of alleged sex abuse in Poland.

On 11 May 2019, Polak issued an apology on behalf of the entire Catholic Church in Poland. The same day, Tell No One, a documentary detailing accounts of sex abuse by Catholic church workers in Poland, went viral, obtaining 8.1 million viewers on YouTube by 13 May. The film accused former Polish leader Lech Wałęsa's personal priest Franciszek Cybula, who is now deceased, of sexual abuse and noted that he transferred between parishes. The film also alleges that Dariusz Olejniczak, a priest who was sentenced for molesting seven-year-old girls, was allowed to continue working with young people despite his conviction. On 14 May 2019, Poland's ruling Law and Justice (PiS) party, which has long had an alliance with the nation's Catholic Bishops, agreed to increase penalties for child sex abuse by raising the maximum prison sentence from 12 years to 30 years and raising the age of consent from 15 to 16. Prosecutor and PiS lawmaker Stanislaw Piotrowicz, who heads the Polish Parliament's Justice Commission, has also been criticised for playing down the actions of a priest who was convicted for inappropriately touching and kissing young girls.

On 16 May 2020, Polak asked the Vatican to investigate sex abuse claims involving brothers Marek and Tomasz Sekielski. The two brothers released a popular YouTube documentary titled Hide and Seek, which detailed their allegations that they were molested by a Polish Catholic priest. Polak expressed support towards the allegations, stating "The film... shows that protection standards for children and adolescents in the Church were not respected."

Diocese of Kielce

In Tell No One a priest known as Father Jan A., who served the Diocese of Kielce in the village of Topola, confessed to molesting a young girl.

Diocese of Opole

In 2018, the Bishop of Opole, Andrzej Czaja in a letter to the faithful read at all masses in the diocese on Sunday, 7 October, apologised to the victims and admitted that 6 priests from his diocese were found guilty of sexual abuse against minors.

Archdiocese of Poznań

In March 2002, the Archbishop of Poznań, Juliusz Paetz, stepped down following accusations, which he denied, of sexually molesting young priests.

Diocese of Kalisz

On 25 June 2020, Pope Francis ordered Bishop Edward Janiak, age 67, to resign from his duties as bishop of the Roman Catholic Diocese of Kalisz for protecting priests who committed acts of sex abuse. He appointed Archbishop Grzegorz Ryś of Łódź as apostolic administrator sede plena, which means he has full administrative authority. On 17 October 2020, Pope Francis accepted Janiak's resignation from the diocese.

Diocese of Płock

In early 2007, allegations surfaced that former bishop Stanislaw Wielgus (later very briefly Archbishop of Warsaw) was aware that several priests in his former diocese of Płock were sexually abusing minors.

Diocese of Warsaw-Praga

On 27 September 2018, Warsaw-Praga Bishop Romuald Kamiński apologised to those who had been victims of sexual abuse in his Diocese.

Archdiocese of Gdansk

In 2019, three protestors toppled a statue of Henryk Jankowski following revelations that he had sexually abused Barbara Borowiecka when she was a girl. Jankowski was the subject of a criminal investigation in 2004 related to alleged sexual abuse of a boy; the case was dropped. He was defrocked in 2004. He died in 2010 without having been convicted of sex abuse. Lech Wałęsa's personal chaplain, Franciszek Cybula, had been accused of sex abuse while serving in the clergy. On 13 August 2020, Pope Francis removed Gdansk Archbishop Slawoj Leszek Glodz, who was among those who covered up abuse committed by Jankowski and Cybula. Glodz had presided over Cybula's funeral. Although Glodz had turned 75, the required age for Catholic bishops to offer their resignation, his removal by Pope Francis was described as "cleaning house". It is highly unusual for the pope to accept such a resignation on a prelate's birthday.

Archdiocese of Wroclaw

On 6 November 2020, The Holy See's nuncio to Poland announced that following an investigation by the Holy See regarding sex abuse allegations, Cardinal Henryk Gulbinowicz was now "barred from any kind of celebration or public meeting and from using his episcopal insignia, and is deprived of the right to a cathedral funeral and burial." Gulbinowicz was also ordered to pay an "appropriate sum" to his alleged victims. Gulbinowicz was the former archbishop of Wroch, whose support of the trade union Solidarity played a critical role in the collapse of communism in Poland. On 16 November 2020, 10 days after the Vatican announced their sanctions, Gulbinowicz died, but, as a result of the disciplinary action, could not have a funeral at or be buried in Wroclaw's Cathedral of St. John the Baptist.

=== Portugal ===
In Portugal an independent commission commissioned by the Catholic Church reported in February 2023 that at least 4,815 children had been abused by Catholic clergy since 1950.

=== Slovenia ===
Archdiocese of Ljubljana

- Franc Frantar – detained in 2006 for sexual abuse of up to 16 minors. He was later sentenced to five years in prison. He initially escaped prosecution by escaping to Malawi to work there as a missionary, but returned to Slovenia after an Interpol notice was issued.
- Marko Rupnik – In November 2022, Italian media reports began to appear alleging that Jesuit priest Rupnik had sexually and psychologically abused a number of nuns three decades earlier in the 1990s in a convent in Slovenia when he was their spiritual director. In December 2022, a 58-year-old ex-nun gave an interview to an Italian newspaper, describing several allegations of sexual and psychological abuse committed by Rupnik against her and fellow nuns. The Slovenian Jesuit headquarters and the Vatican acknowledged the case, saying Rupnik had been excommunicated by the Vatican's Dicastery for the Doctrine of the Faith several years earlier, but the excommunication was lifted after Rupnik repented, and although "partial sanctions" remained in place, the Dicastery stated that the case exceeded the statute of limitations. The Jesuit order and the Vatican made several public statements that several people involved found "contradictory", causing some leading Jesuits to call for a full review of how the Jesuit order and Vatican handled the case. On 3 January 2023, Catholic online newspaper The New Daily Compass reported that Rupnik had retired from his public positions into a monastery. On 6 January 2023, the Slovenian Jesuit order said in a statement they 'believe in the sincerity of the nuns and other victims who have spoken out about their suffering and other circumstances regarding emotional, sexual and spiritual abuse by our confrere. We sincerely ask for forgiveness from all.' Their testimonies 'show beyond doubt that the competent Church leaders did not take appropriate action, which has increased and prolonged the untold suffering of a number of women'. Reuters called the case "embarrassing" for the Jesuit order, 'but also for Pope Francis, who is a member of the order.'

=== Spain ===
In October 2023, Ángel Gabilondo, the Spanish Ombudsman released a 800-page report to the speaker of the Spanish parliament’s lower house and to reporters. The country's first official probe of sex abuse by clergy members or other people connected to the Catholic Church in the country included a survey that indicated potentially 200–440 000 victims since 1940.

=== Sweden ===
Diocese of Stockholm

One child was sexually abused by a priest several years in the late 1950s. When the child raised the issue at the time, the priest was protected and the abuse was kept quiet by the church. The victim reported the abuse to the Stockholm diocese again in December 2005, demanding a public apology from the church. In June 2007 Sweden's Catholic church made a public apology in two newspapers.

=== United Kingdom ===
There have been Catholic Church sexual abuse cases in several dioceses across the United Kingdom.

=== England ===
Between 2001 and 2014, 52 Catholic clergy were laicized throughout England and Wales. In 2020, the Independent Inquiry into Child Sexual Abuse released a report which stated that the Catholic Church of England and Wales "swept under the carpet" allegations of sex abuse and numerous Catholic clergy in England and Wales. According to the report, Vincent Nichols, now a cardinal and the senior Catholic cleric in England and Wales, "There was no acknowledgement of any personal responsibility". The report also accused Nichols of protecting the reputation of the Church rather than protecting victims and lacked compassion towards victims.

==== Archdiocese of Birmingham ====
Father Alexander Bede Walsh was sentenced to 22 years in prison in March 2012 for serious child sex offences against boys. Walsh used religion to control his young victims, telling one boy that drinking alcohol would get him to heaven, and another believed that the abuse was the hand of God touching him, for example. One young victim was driven to a suicide attempt. Walsh had a previous conviction for computer indecency.

James Robinson worked in parishes in the English Midlands and when an accusation of child abuse happened in the 1980s, the Roman Catholic Church allowed him to escape to the United States though they knew about an "unwholesome relationship" the priest had with a boy. Robinson remained free for over 20 years till in the first decade of the 21st century he was extradited back to the UK to face charges. Robinson has received a 21-year prison sentence for multiple child sex offences. The Roman Catholic Church paid Robinson up to £800 per month despite knowing the allegations against him.

There are widespread accusations of physical abuse, emotional abuse and sexual abuse of unprotected children at Father Hudson Home, Coleshill, Warwickshire. There are even allegations that vulnerable children disappeared inexplicably. According to reports, priests and nuns were the perpetrators.

===== Diocese of Shrewsbury =====
In December 2012, staff at the Christian Brothers school St Ambrose College, Altrincham, were implicated in a child sex abuse case involving teaching staff carrying out alleged acts of abuse both on and off school grounds, although no current staff are said to be involved. More than fifty former pupils contacted police, either as victims of, or witnesses to, sexual abuse. The alleged sexual abuse, including molestation of children while corporal punishment was administered, stemmed from 1962 onwards and continued over four decades. Alan Morris, a Catholic deacon who also once served not only as a teacher at St. Ambrose, but also as the school's deputy head, was convicted in 2014 of 19 counts of sexual abuse he committed between 1972 and 1990 and was given a nine-year prison sentence. An overall total of 47 indictments were issued, with at least 27 made public since Morris was convicted.

==== Archdiocese of Liverpool ====
In December 2018, former Liverpool priest Francis William Simpson was convicted of sexually abusing four boys in front of their parents, one as young as seven. In February 2019, Simpson was given a sentence of two years and two months in prison.

===== Diocese of Leeds =====
On 1 December 2020, Diocese of Leeds priest Fr. Patrick Smythe faced four counts of indecent assault on four boys aged under 16 while he was serving the Catholic church in Leeds and Skipton between the years 1979 and 1983. Symthe was investigated by West Yorkshire Police for these allegations. He was set to make his first appearance at the Leeds Magistrates' Court on 16 December 2020. In April 2022 he was convicted of sexually assaulting six boys and jailed for 7.5 years.

==== Archdiocese of Southwark ====
- In 2000, Father James Murphy of Glounthaune was sentenced to 30 months in prison after being convicted of sexually abusing altar boys in a London parish where he served 20 years prior.
- In 2002, Michael Hill, the former secretary to the Archdiocese of Southwark's Catholic Children Society who was previously convicted for sex abuse, received his second prison sentence for abuse he committed while serving in the Archdiocese of Southwark.
- In 2003, David Murphy, a former Edinburgh priest turned charity worker, was convicted of sex abusing various boys and girls at St Mary's Home in Gravesend, Kent.
- In 2015, Father Andrew McSweeney, who had also good ties to some local celebrities and even married Frank Bruno to his now ex-wife Laura, was sentenced to three years in prison for sexually abusing a 15-year-old boy and three counts of making indecent images of children.

===== Diocese of Arundel and Brighton =====
In July 2000, the head of the Roman Catholic Church in England and Wales, Archbishop Cormac Murphy-O'Connor (later a cardinal), acknowledged he had made a mistake while he was Bishop of Arundel and Brighton in the 1980s by allowing a paedophile to carry on working as a priest. The priest at the centre of the controversy, Father Michael Hill, was jailed in 1997 for abusing nine boys over a 20-year period.

===== Diocese of Plymouth =====
In 2007, former monks William Manahan OSB, the Father Prior of Buckfast Abbey Preparatory School, and Paul Couch were convicted of molesting boys in the school during the 1970s.

==== Benedictines ====
===== Belmont Abbey =====
In 2004, former priest John Kinsey of Belmont Abbey, Herefordshire, was sentenced at Worcester Crown Court for five years for sexual assaults on schoolboys in the mid-1980s.

===== Kiltegan Fathers =====
Jeremiah McGrath of the Kiltegan Fathers was convicted in Liverpool in May 2007 for facilitating abuse by Billy Adams. McGrath had given Adams £20,000 in 2005 and Adams had used the money to impress a 12-year-old who he then raped over a six-month period. McGrath denied knowing about the abuse but admitted having a brief sexual relationship with Adams. His appeal in January 2008 was dismissed.

===== Diocese of Middlesbrough =====
James Carragher, principal of the former St. William's residential school, Market Weighton owned by the Diocese of Middlesbrough, was jailed for 14 years in 2004 for abusing boys in his care over a 20-year period. The principal and the chaplain (Anthony McCallen) at the school were both given prison sentences in 2016. The sentencing judge said:

The victims were effectively trapped and there was no escape from you. They were confused, frightened and in turmoil. It has blighted their lives and each of you had contributed significantly to their misery. [Victims endured] severe long-term, continuing psychological harm as a result of what you did

Over 200 former pupils at St William's say they were abused there. Many former pupils are suing for compensation. The school catered for boys with emotional and behavioural problems.

===== Ealing Abbey, St Benedict's School =====
In 2009, Dom David Pearce, a monk of Ealing Abbey and former headmaster of the junior department of its associated school, St Benedict's, was sentenced to eight years in prison for sexually abusing boys. In April 2006, civil damages were awarded jointly against Pearce in relation to an alleged assault by Pearce on a pupil while teaching at the school in the 1990s, although criminal charges were dropped.

In October 2017, Andrew Soper (known as Father Laurence), former abbot of Ealing Abbey, was found guilty on 19 sexual offences against pupils of St Benedict's school in the 1970s and 1980s.

===== Downside School =====
In 2004, a Benedictine monk was jailed for 18 months after taking indecent images of schoolboys and possessing child pornography when he was a teacher at Downside School. In January 2012, Father Richard White, a monk who formerly taught at the school, was jailed for five years for gross indecency and indecent assault against a pupil in the late 1980s. White, 66, who was known to pupils as Father Nick, had been allowed to continue teaching after he was first caught abusing a child in 1987 and was able to go on to groom and assault another pupil in the junior school. He was placed on a restricted ministry after the second incident, but was not arrested until 2010. Two other Downside monks, also former teachers, received police cautions during an 18-month criminal trial.

In May 2020, it was revealed that a 2018 Independent Inquiry into Child Sexual Abuse (IICSA) report regarding child sex abuse at Downside School later resulted major financial problems for the school due to spiralling legal costs. In order to raise money, Downside was forced to sell some of its Renaissance-era paintings.

==== Case of Francis McDermott ====
In March 2019, Father Francis McDermott was sentenced to 9 1/2 years in prison for molesting six children in London, Norwich and High Wycombe between 1971 and 1978.

=== Scotland ===
Child sex abuse has affected many different Scottish diocese and the credibility of the Church has been damaged. Some Catholics lost faith due to the scandal.

One notable case was an unnamed woman many times locked in a darkened room by a sexually abusive nun who was her carer. Aged 8 she told a priest about the abuse during Confessions. After that the priest and the nun raped her together. There are allegations that at Fort Augustus Abbey there were physical beating, verbal humiliation and sexual abuse. Carlkemp prep school, a feeder school preparing younger pupils for Fort Augustus is also implicated. The Guardian and the BBC both reported complaints that the Scottish Church hierarchy did not cooperate fully over investigations of child sex abuse. Alan Draper of Dundee University accused the Scottish Catholic Church of reluctance to expose priests leading double lives including those accused of sex abuse. Draper revealed bishops knew of 20 cases from 1985 to 1995 but refused to bring in experts. Draper wants relevant files given to a judicial enquiry. Public offers of support from the Church for abuse victims are met with private lack of support and an adversarial attitude when legal action is involved. Draper alleges this contrasts with protection, therapy and financial help traditionally provided for abusers. Draper commented, "The latest statement makes no mention of assessing what support has been provided to survivors. It is window dressing yet again. They have learned nothing."

Victims describe The McLellan Report into child sex abuse as a whitewash. The McLellan Report fails to state which bishops and priests were responsible over decades of child sex abuse and in Scotland, which members of the hierarchy knew about abuse without acting, and ordered victims not to be supported. Some guilty priests will be given the job of introducing safeguards in their parishes while it is feared denial and corruption will continue in the Church. Flaws in the procedures for addressing sexual abuse highlighted in the report include different rules and standards in different dioceses and lack of central guidance on sanctions, abuse victims being left out when central policies were drafted and disregarding United Nations definitions of abuse. There was a culture of cover-up where words were not met with actions. However, it has been acknowledged in at least one case that former Diocese of Galloway Bishop Maurice Taylor had received a confession of abuse from local Ayrshire priest Paul Moore in 1996 and choose to send Moore to a treatment centre in Toronto and to Fort Augustus Abbey in the Highlands instead of turning him into the authorities.

==== Archdiocese of St Andrews and Edinburgh ====
Complaints were made that Cardinal Keith O'Brien was guilty of predatory sexual acts against various junior clerics. O'Brien admitted unspecified sexual misconduct.

At the time of his arrest, David Murphy was also living in Edinburgh.

==== Diocese of Galloway ====
In 1998, former teacher at St. Columba's College, Largs, Norman Bulloch (Brother Norman) made a successful not-guilty plea with respect to the abuse of a pupil at the school between September 1971 and June 1972. Despite the not-guilty plea regarding the St Columba's abuse, Bulloch was jailed for eight years for the sexual assault of two boys at St Joseph's, Dumfries between 1972 and 1976.

In 2014 the Marist Brothers offered a former full-board pupil of St. Columba's College, Largs compensation following allegations that David Germanus (Brother Germanus) had sexually and physically abused him between 1962 and 1964 when he was aged between 7 and 9. This offer was turned down and the case went to the Court of Session. Judge Lady Wolffe ruled that the case be time-barred due to a "long negative prescription". In January 2017, Lord Justice Clerk Lady Dorrian dismissed an appeal in the case.

In June 2017, the Marist Brothers admitted to systemic failures to protect pupils from sexual abuse at the Scottish Child Abuse Inquiry.

In February 2018, former teacher at St. Columba's, Peter Toner (Brother Peter) was convicted of sexual and physical abuse of six pupils between 1980 and 1982 when the pupils were aged between 8 and 11. This prompted calls from his victims for a wider review of possible abuse he may have carried out elsewhere. Toner was jailed for 10 years for the St Columba's offences in March 2019 with the judge stating, "Your predatory sex offending was a dreadful breach of trust. You wrecked the lives of these young boys. You present a danger of causing serious sexual harm to children". At the time of sentencing Toner was already behind bars for attacking two boys at a different school.

In September 2018 St. Columba's College, Largs and St Joseph's College, Dumfries was announced as being added to the Scottish Child Abuse Inquiry's investigations with particular focus given to the schools in phase 4 of the investigation when hearings looked at residential child care establishments run by male religious orders. In October 2019 the Inquiry heard that one pupil experienced physical and sexual abuse from David Germanus and sexual abuse from an unnamed member of teaching staff between 1958 and 1962 when the pupil was aged between 8 and 12.

In 2018, Fr. Paul Moore was convicted of sexually abusing three children between 1977 and 1981 and a student priest in 1995.

==== Archdiocese of Glasgow ====
In July 2015, the Archdiocese of Glasgow issued an apology for the victims of Fr. Colman Mcgrath, who was convicted of sexually abusing a boy at his parish in Langside, Glasgow.

On 6 May 2021, Fr. John Sweeney was cleared of false allegations made against him.

In December 2018, it was announced that the Archdiocese of Glasgow was being sued by a former altar boy who stated that Fr. John Gowens, who died in 1999, repeatedly sexually abused him over a two-year period in the 1970s at the St, Patrick's church in Dumbarton.

In June 2020, Fr. Neil McGarrity, who long led St. Thomas Parish in Riddrie, Glasgow, was arrested on numerous sex abuse charges.

==== Diocese of Motherwell ====
In 2016, Fr. John Farrell, Retired priest of the Diocese of Motherwell, the last head teacher at St Ninian's Orphanage, Falkland, Fife, was sentenced to five years imprisonment. His colleague Paul Kelly, a retired teacher from Portsmouth, was given ten years, both were convicted of the physical and sexual abuse of boys between the years 1979 and 1983. More than 100 charges involving 35 boys were made. Farrell and Kelly were members of the Irish Christian Brothers when the crimes were committed at the orphanage which closed in 1983. According to The Times, it is believed this was the largest historical abuse case ever tried in Scotland.

==== Diocese of Aberdeen ====
In addition to his Glasgow conviction, Fr. Colman McGrath was convicted for sexually abusing two boys who were training to join the priesthood at Blairs College in Aberdeen. His crimes in Glasgow and Abedeen occurred between 1972 and 1982. For all of these convictions, McGrath received a sentence of 200 hours of unpaid community service, three years of supervised release, and will be placed on the sex offenders' register throughout the remainder of this life.

===== Fort Augustus Abbey =====
In 2013 The Observer newspaper reported that Scottish police were investigating allegations that pupils had been subject to physical and sexual abuse while at the abbey school. A BBC Scotland Investigates programme, entitled Sins of Our Fathers, reported allegations that Fort Augustus Abbey was used as a "dumping ground" for clergy previously accused of abuse elsewhere. Some 50 former pupils spoke of their experiences. Many former pupils reported only good memories, but there were accounts of violence and sexual assault including rape by monks. The programme contains evidence against seven Fort Augustus monks; two headmasters have also been accused of covering-up the abuse. The head of the Benedictines, Dom Richard Yeo, apologised to any victims. In particular, five men were raped or sexually abused by Father Aidan Duggan, an Australian monk who taught at Carlekemp Priory School in North Berwick and Fort Augustus Abbey between 1953 and 1974. Fort Augustus Abbey closed as a school in 1993 and ceased to be a Catholic facility in 1998.

In 2013, an apology was issued by the former headmaster to victims of Fr. Denis Chrysostom Alexander. In 2017, Alexander was arrested in Sydney, Australia and faces an extradition for sexual and physical abuse he reportedly committed at the former Fort Augustus Abbey in the 1970s. In April 2019, the Australian government ruled that he could be extradited, though this has yet to receive final approval from the Federal Court of Australia.

In March 2019, Scottish priest Fr. Robert MacKenzie was arrested in Canada and faces an extradition for sexually abusing children at the now closed Fort Augustus Abbey between the 1950s and 1980s. Canada's Minister of Justice approved the extradition, though an appeal is pending.

=== Wales ===
==== Archdiocese of Cardiff ====
- In 1998, Father John Lloyd, a parish priest and Bishop John Aloysius Ward's former press secretary, was imprisoned for sexual offences involving children.
- In October 2000, Father Joseph Jordan was imprisoned for indecent assaults on boys, and for downloading child pornography from the Internet.
- In 2004, former priest John Kinsey OSB of Belmont Abbey, Herefordshire, was sentenced at Worcester Crown Court for sexual assaults on schoolboys in the mid-1980s.

==== Caldey Abbey ====
In August 2016, three women launched a legal action against Caldey Abbey for sexual abuse, which reached a financial settlement with six claimants. In April 2024, the abbey commissioned an independent review into the historical child sexual abuse. Dozens of children had been sexually abused by a Cistercian monk over decades, involving rape and sexual assault of boys and girls, until his death in 1992. The December 2024, the abbot, Father Jan Rossey, apologised for the abuse and its cover-up. Monks have agreed to a 'no touch' policy for visitors.

=== Vatican ===
==== Holy See ====
On 23 June 2018, a Holy See tribunal convicted former diplomat Carlo Capella for possessing child pornography while in the Holy See's U.S. nunciature and handed him a five-year prison sentence.

On 9 December 2019, lawyers brought a sexual abuse lawsuit against the Holy See, regarding an alleged cover up of abuse committed by former Cardinal Theodore McCarrick.

On 19 November 2020, four people who accused McCarrick of sexually abusing them filed a lawsuit against the Holy See in federal court in Newark, New Jersey, saying it had failed in its oversight of McCarrick over whom it exercised complete control as his employer. The Holy See says priests are not its employees and that its status as a foreign sovereign is a defence from such a suit.

==== Vatican City ====
On 14 October 2020, the first ever criminal trial held within the Vatican City for sex abuse began, and involves a priest accused of sexually abusing a former St. Pius X youth seminary student between 2007 and 2012 and another for aiding and abetting the abuse. The accused abuser, Gabriele Martinelli, 28, was a seminarian and has since become a priest. The other defendant is the seminary's 72-year-old former rector Enrico Radice, who is charged with aiding and abetting the alleged abuse.

== North America ==
=== Canada ===
Archdiocese of St. John's

In the 1990s, criminal proceedings began against members of the Christian Brothers in Newfoundland. In July 2020, Peter Power was charged with charges of sexual touching, sexual assault and committing an indecent act involving two teenaged boys, aged 18 and 16 years old at a residence in a small Newfoundland community earlier in the year. Though officially retired, Power was still occasionally active in Catholic ministry. The same month, the Court of Appeal of Newfoundland and Labrador unanimously reversed a 2018 Canadian Supreme Court ruling and ruled that the Archdiocese of Saint John's was liable for the sexual abuse committed at the Mount Cashel Orphanage in the 1950s and 1960s.

Basilian Orders

As of August 2020, at least three Canadian Basilian priests, Robert Whyte, John O'Keefe, and William Hodgson Marshall have been convicted for sexual abuse. In October 2020, an investigation by CityNews found that 14 Basilians in Canada were accused of committing acts of sex abuse.

Military Ordinariate of Canada

On 7 September 2020, Canadian Armed Forces spokesman Maj. Travis Smyth acknowledged that Capt. Jean El-Dahdouh, a Maronite Church military chaplain found guilty the previous year of assault and sexual assault after a series of incidents at the Nordik Spa-Nature in Chelsea, Quebec, was still a member of the Canadian military, but he was expected to soon be released from the armed forces.

On 16 November 2020, documents which the Canadian Forces sought keep sealing for 40 years were public. The documents revealed that Canadian Forces knew that Catholic Chaplain Capt. Angus McRae had victims before his 1980 sex abuse conviction for children to his quarters at an Edmonton military base and gave them alcohol before sexually assaulting them.

Archdiocese of Montreal

On 25 November 2020, former Quebec Superior Court justice Pepita Capriolo released a report which found that some former officials in the Archdiocese of Montreal took no action against pedophile priest Brian Boucher after receiving reports that he sexually abused boys. Stating, among other things, that "The primary culprit is the lack of accountability of the people involved in Boucher's education, training and career. Complaints were 'passed on' and no one took responsibility for acting on them." The Catholic church assigned Capriolo to the investigate the Archdiocese of Montreal after Boucher pled to sex abuse charges in January 2019 and received an eight-year prison sentence. Among the former Archdiocese of Montreal officials named in Capriololo's report as having knowledge of reports of sex abuse against Boucher where Cardinal Marc Ouellet, once a candidate for the papacy, Cardinal Jean-Claude Turcotte, now deceased, and Anthony Mancini, the Archbishop of Halifax.

Archdiocese of Vancouver

In 2019, the Archdiocese of Vancouver publicly named nine clergymen who were criminally convicted of sexual abuse or who had civil lawsuits related to abuse settled against them. It was also acknowledged that the archdiocese was aware of 36 sex abuse cases since the 1950s involving 26 children. The Archdiocese of Vancouver was the first among Canada's 60 Catholic dioceses to make this information public. In August 2020, a new sex abuse lawsuit was filed against the Archdiocese of Vancouver. The lead plaintiff, identified only by the initials "K.S." in the court documents, said the priest in charge of St. Francis of Assisi School, Michael Conaghan, sexually assaulted her while she was a student at the school in the 1980s. She was around 11 years old at the time of the alleged abuse. Conaghan, who died four days after the lawsuit was filed, was not among the nine clergy listed by the Archiocese in 2019. The lawsuit also alleges the Archdiocese of Vancouver followed marching orders from the Vatican for years on how to bury allegations of abuse within its parishes. On 14 December 2020, it was revealed the Archdiocese of Vancouver had settled more sex abuse cases involved three additional priests who sexually abused 13 previously-undisclosed victims. The three priests named were also not previously listed on the Archdiocese of Vancouver's credibly accused list.

=== El Salvador ===
In November 2015, sex abuse scandals in El Salvador's sole non-military Catholic diocese, the Archdiocese of San Salvador, started coming to light when the archdiocese's third highest-ranking priest Jesus Delgado, who was also the biographer and personal secretary of the Salvadoran Archbishop Oscar Romero was dismissed by the archdiocese after its investigation showed that he had molested a girl, now 42 years of age, when she was between the ages of 9 and 17. Due to the statute of limitations, Delgado could not face criminal charges. In December 2016, a canonical court convicted Delgado and two other El Salvador priests, Francisco Galvez and Antonio Molina, of committing acts of sex abuse between the years 1980 and 2000 and laicised them from the priesthood. In November 2019, the archdiocese acknowledged sex abuse committed by a priest identified as Leopoldo Sosa Tolentino in 1994 and issued a public apology to his victim. Tolentino was suspended from ministry and began the canonical trial process. It was also reported at this time that another El Salvador priest had been laicised in 2019 after pleading guilty to sex abuse in a Holy See trial and is serving a 16-year prison sentence after being convicted in a criminal trial.

=== Mexico ===
Marcial Maciel (1920–2008) founded the Legion of Christ, a Catholic order of priests originating in Mexico. Nine former seminarians of his order accused Maciel of molestation. Maciel maintained his innocence of the accusations.

=== United States ===
Archdiocese of Anchorage

In 2007, the Oregon Province of the Society of Jesus (which includes priests in the territory of Alaska, Idaho, Montana, Oregon and Washington) made a $50 million payout to over 100 Inuit who alleged that they had been sexually abused as children in Alaska. It was the largest settlement by any province of the Jesuit order. The Society of Jesus priests are an independent religious institute reporting directly to the Pope. The settlement did not require the Jesuit priests to admit to having molested Inuit children. Allegations named 13 or 14 priests who were said to have molested children under their care over a period of 30 years. None of these priests was ever criminally prosecuted for such allegations.

The Diocese of Fairbanks faced separate cases because it owned and managed the churches in which the priests served. The 135 lawsuits filed against the diocese had been reduced to ten by November 2007 and were expected to be mediated and settled. But in 2008 the Diocese filed for Chapter 11 bankruptcy, saying that settlement efforts had failed and it did not have funds to pay the nearly 150 plaintiffs who alleged sexual abuse by priests or church workers from the 1950s to the 1980s.

Archdiocese of Boston

Allegations of sexual misconduct by priests of the Archdiocese of Boston and, following revelations of a cover-up by the Archbishop of Boston, Cardinal Bernard Francis Law, were reported by the Boston Globe in numerous articles in 2004. Roman Catholics in other dioceses of the United States began to investigate similar situations. Cardinal Law's actions prompted public scrutiny of the United States Conference of Catholic Bishops and the steps taken in response to past and current allegations of sexual misconduct by priests. The events in the Archdiocese of Boston became a national scandal, as were revelations of cover ups by numerous dioceses across the country.

Archdiocese of Chicago

Daniel McCormack, a self-confessed sexually abusive priest, was convicted and sentenced to five years in prison for abusing five boys (aged 8–12 years) in 2001.

Diocese of Cleveland

Robert McWilliams, 40, was indicted on 1 July 2020 on federal criminal charges: two counts of sex trafficking of a minor, three counts of sexual exploitation of children, one count of transportation of child pornography, one count of receiving and distributing depictions of minors engaged in sexually explicit conduct, and one count of possession of child pornography.

Diocese of Crookston

Joseph Palanivel Jeyapaul was charged with molesting two teenage girls at a Catholic church in Greenbush, Minnesota, a small rural town near the Canada–United States border. The abuse occurred in 2004. Charges were filed in 2006 and amended in 2007. Without facing legal punishment, Jevapaul returned to his home diocese in Ootacamund, India. As of 2010 he was working in the diocesan office. A Roseau County, Minnesota attorney is seeking to extradite the priest from India in a criminal case involving one of the girls. The Archbishop of Madras (now called "Chennai"), India, has asked Jeyapaul to return to the US to face the charges. Jevapaul has said that he will not fight extradition if the US seeks it.

Diocese of Davenport

On 10 October 2006, the Diocese of Davenport, Iowa filed for Chapter 11 bankruptcy protection because of settlement claims related to sexual abuse by clergy.

Archdiocese of Dubuque

In 2006 the archdiocese settled a number of claims of sexual abuse, and the Archbishop offered a personal apology.

Diocese of Fall River

James Porter was a Roman Catholic priest who was convicted of molesting 28 children; He admitted sexually abusing at least 100 of both sexes over a period of 30 years, starting in the 1960s. Bishop Sean O'Malley of the Diocese of Fall River settled 101 abuse claims and initiated a zero-tolerance policy against sexual abuse. He also instituted one of the first comprehensive sexual abuse policies in the Roman Catholic Church.

On 11 December 2020, Mark R. Hesson, also known as "Father Mark", of Hyannisport, Massachusetts, was indicted on two counts of rape, one count of indecent assault and battery on a child under age 14, and one count of intimidation of a witness. Hesson was known to many locals because of his past work at Our Lady of Victory Church. He had delivered the homily at Senator Edward "Ted" Kennedy's funeral in August 2009.

Diocese of Honolulu

Joseph Bukoski, III, Honolulu, Hawaii, a member of the Congregation of the Sacred Hearts of Jesus and Mary, was canonically removed in 2003 as the pastor of Maria Lanakila Catholic Church in Lahaina by Bishop Francis X. DiLorenzo for allegations relating to sexual improprieties some 30 years earlier. Bukoski issued a written public apology to his victim on 12 November 2005.

James "Ron" Gonsalves, Wailuku, Hawaii, administrator of Saint Ann Roman Catholic Church in Waihee, Maui, pleaded guilty on 17 May 2006 to several counts of sexual assault of a 12-year-old male. Bishop Clarence Richard Silva has permanently withdrawn his faculties and has initiated laicisation proceedings against Deacon Gonsalves with the Congregation for the Doctrine of the Faith.

Archdiocese of Los Angeles

The Archdiocese of Los Angeles agreed to pay out 60 million dollars to settle 45 lawsuits; it faces more than 450 other pending cases. According to the Associated Press, 22 priests were named in the settlement, with some cases going back as far as the 1930s. 20 million dollars of the total was paid by the insurers of the archdiocese. The main administrative office of the archdiocese is due to be sold to cover the cost of these and future lawsuits. The archdiocese will settle about 500 cases for about $600 million.

Diocese of Memphis

The Diocese of Memphis reached a $2 million settlement with a man who was abused as a boy by Juan Carlos Duran. This priest had a history of sexual misconduct with juveniles in St. Louis, Missouri, as well as Panama, and Bolivia.

Archdiocese of Miami

Since 1966, the Archdiocese of Miami insurance programs have paid $26.1 million in settlement, legal, and counseling costs associated with sexual misconduct allegations made by minors involving priests, laity, and religious brothers and sisters.

Archdiocese of Milwaukee

A 2003 report on the sexual abuse of minors by clergy in the Archdiocese of Milwaukee revealed that allegations of sexually assaulting minors had been made against 58 ordained men. By early 2009, the Archdiocese of Milwaukee had spent approximately $26.5 million in attorney fees and settlements. Under Archbishop Timothy Dolan, the archdiocese was able to avoid bankruptcy from lawsuits.

A Wisconsin priest, Lawrence C Murphy, who taught at the former St. John School for the Deaf in the Milwaukee suburb of St. Francis, Wisconsin, from 1950 to 1974, allegedly molested more than 200 deaf boys. Several U.S. bishops warned the Holy See that failure to act on the matter could embarrass the church. Murphy was moved by Milwaukee Archbishop William E Cousins to Superior, Wisconsin, a small city near Lake Superior. During his final 24 years, he worked with children in parishes, schools, and a juvenile detention center. He died in 1998. As of March 2010, there were four outstanding lawsuits against the Archdiocese of Milwaukee in the case.

Archdiocese of New Orleans

The Archdiocese of New Orleans filed for bankruptcy on 1 May 2020, saying it needed reorganization to provide time to develop a plan for settling claims using its assets and insurance.

Diocese of Oakland

In 1981, the former priest Stephen Kiesle was convicted of tying up and molesting two boys in a California church rectory. From 1981 to 1985, Bishop John Stephen Cummins, who oversaw Kiesle, contacted the Holy See about laicising him. Then-cardinal Joseph Ratzinger, the future Pope Benedict XVI, responded by letter that the case needed more time, as it was "necessary to consider the good of the Universal Church" and "the detriment that granting the dispensation" could provoke among the faithful. In 1987, the Holy See laicised Kiesle. The letter was widely regarded as evidence of Ratzinger's role in blocking the removal of pedophile priests. Holy See officials responded that that interpretation rested on a misreading of the letter, in which the issue was not whether Kiesle should be laicised but whether he should be granted the dispensation he had requested from the obligation of chastity. By refusing to grant such a dispensation right away in the Kiesle case, Ratzinger was actually being tough with an abuser, not lax.

Archdiocese of Omaha

In 2018, the Archdiocese of Omaha unveiled the names of 38 priests and other clergy members who have been credibly accused of sexual misconduct, a move prompted by a request from the state's top prosecutor. At least two men on the list where convicted and served prison sentences for molesting children. Among those listed was defrocked Omaha priest Daniel Herek, who was sentenced to prison in 1999 for sexually assaulting and videotaping a 14-year-old boy. He also served jail time several years later for exposing himself in an Omaha parking lot as well. John Fiala, who left the Omaha Archdiocese in 1996, was also among those listed. Fiala died in 2017 in a Texas prison after being convicted of sexually abusing a teenage boy and of trying to hire a hit man to kill the victim. The 2018 list was also accompanied by a written apology from Omaha Archbishop George Lucas.

Diocese of Helena

During his tenure as the Bishop of Helena, Montana, Archbishop Elden Francis Curtiss chose to reassign a priest who had been accused of pedophilia in 1959, later admitting that he had not properly examined the church's personnel file on the individual concerned. Curtiss faced similar criticism in 2001 in regard to a priest accused of accessing child pornography. Curtiss, it was alleged, had failed to bring the case to the attention of the authorities, and had chosen to send the priest for counseling and to reassign the priest, removing him from his high-school teaching position but reassigning him to a middle-school.

Diocese of Orange, California

On 3 January 2005, Bishop Tod Brown of the Diocese of Orange apologized to 87 alleged victims of sexual abuse and announced a settlement of $100 million following two years of mediation.

Diocese of Palm Beach

Joseph Keith Symons resigned as ordinary in 1998 after admitting he molested five boys while he was a pastor. Symons' successor, Anthony O'Connell, resigned in 2002, after admitting that he, too, had engaged in sexual abuse.

Catholic Church in Pennsylvania

Archdiocese of Philadelphia

According to a 2005 investigation, while serving as assistant vicar for administration in 1996, Bishop Cistone was involved with silencing a nun who tried to alert parishioners at St. Gabriel parish about abuse by a priest. According to the report, there were several other instances of priest sexual abuse that Cistone was complicit in covering up.

Diocese of Peoria

Coadjutor Bishop John J. Myers of Peoria was among the two-thirds of sitting bishops and acting diocese administrators that the Dallas Morning News found had allowed priests accused of sexual abuse to continue working.

Diocese of Phoenix

On 21 November 2005, Dale Fushek of the Diocese of Phoenix was arrested and charged with 10 criminal misdemeanor counts related to alleged inappropriate sexual contact with teens and young adults.

Archdiocese of Portland (Oregon)

The Archdiocese of Portland filed for Chapter 11 reorganization on 6 July 2004, hours before two abuse trials were set to begin. Portland became the first Catholic diocese to file for bankruptcy. An open letter to the archdiocese's parishioners explained the archbishop's motivation.

Archdiocese of San Antonio

John Salazar was sentenced to life in prison for sexually assaulting an 18-year-old parishioner.

Diocese of San Diego

On 27 February 2007, the Diocese of San Diego filed for Chapter 11 protection, hours before the first of about 150 lawsuits was due to be heard.

Diocese of Savannah

In October 2009, the diocese of Savannah paid $4.24 million to settle a lawsuit which alleged that Lessard allowed a priest named Wayland Brown to work in the diocese when Lessard knew that Brown was a serial child molester who posed a danger to children.

Diocese of Spokane

Under Bishop William S. Skylstad the Diocese of Spokane declared bankruptcy in December 2004. As part of its bankruptcy, the diocese has agreed to pay at least $48 million as compensation. This payout has to be agreed to by the victims and a judge before it will be made. According to federal bankruptcy judge, Gregg W. Zive, money for the settlement would come from insurance companies, the sale of church property, contributions from Catholic groups and from the diocese's parishes.

Diocese of Stockton

Oliver O'Grady molested multiple children in Stockton. The 2006 documentary Deliver Us from Evil is based on accusations that Bishop Roger Mahony knew that Oliver O'Grady was an active pedophile.

Diocese of Tucson

The Diocese of Tucson filed for bankruptcy in September 2004. It reached an agreement with plaintiffs, which the bankruptcy judge approved on 11 June 2005, specifying terms that included allowing the diocese reorganisation to continue in return for a $22.2 million settlement.

Diocese of Wheeling–Charleston, West Virginia

Bishop Michael J. Bransfield resigned, effective immediately, in September 2018 over unspecified allegations of sexual misconduct.

== Oceania ==
=== Australia ===
In 2017, the Royal Commission into Institutional Responses to Child Sexual Abuse established that some 4,444 claimants alleged incidents of child sexual abuse in 4,756 reported claims to Catholic Church authorities (some claimants made a claim of child sexual abuse against more than one Catholic Church authority) and at least 1,880 suspected abusers from 1980 to 2015. Most of those suspected of abuse were Catholic priests and religious brothers and 62 percent of the survivors who told the commission they were abused in religious institutions were abused in a Catholic facility. By means of a weighted index, the Commission found that at 75 archdioceses/dioceses and religious institutes with priest members examined, some 7 per cent of priests who worked in Australia between 1950 and 2009. On 3 June 2019, 18 months after being ordered to do so by the commission, the Australian Catholic Church published its National Catholic Safeguarding Standards. The standards closely parallel the commission's recommendations as well as norms enshrined by the government in the National Principles for Child Safe Organizations, although some provisions were watered down. One notable alteration concerned the number of hours per year that people should be undergoing professional and pastoral supervision, which was reduced from the recommended 12 hours to 6 hours.

There have also been accusations and legal action towards members of the Salvation Army. According to the investigation, hundreds of children were sexually abused at Australia's Salvation Army boys' homes in Queensland and New South Wales in the 1960s and 1970s.

Archdiocese of Sydney

Ross Murrin, a catholic clergyman, pleaded guilty to sexually abusing eight male students.

Archdiocese of Melbourne

There were several cases of sexual abuse in the Melbourne Archdiocese.

- Michael Charles Glennon: former diocesan priest, sentenced to at least 15 years in jail for sexually abusing four Aboriginal boys between 1984 and 1991.
- Gerry Francis Ridsdale: convicted in 1994, he pleaded guilty on 46 sexual offences.
- Wilfred James Baker: sentenced to four years in prison (parole after two years) for crimes involving eight boys.
- David Daniel: sentenced to six years' jail, with parole after 4½ years, for molesting four boys, a girl and an adult male.
- Paul Pavlou: convicted on 29 June 2009 of committing an indecent act with a child under 16 and of being knowingly in possession of child pornography. He was sentenced to an 18-month jail sentence suspended for 24 months and to a two-year community based order. He was registered on the Sex Offenders Register for 15 years. These offences occurred in 2005–2006 while he was the priest at Healesville in the Archdiocese of Melbourne.
- Francis Klep: convicted of indecent assault in 1994, and charged with an additional five counts. He moved to Samoa, but in 2004 the Samoan government made moves to deport him from the country after becoming aware of the previous conviction and charges.

In September 2020, the Australian state of Queensland passed legislation which makes it so religious institutions, such as the Catholic Church and their members are no longer able to use the sanctity of confession as a defence against failing to report material information about the sexual abuse of children. Under the new Queensland law, clergy who refuse to report confessions of sex abuse will face a maximum sentence of three years in prison. In October 2020, the Royal Commission into Institutional Responses to Child Sexual Abuse found that the church had failed to intervene against Thomas Butler, a Marist Brother known as Brother Patrick, when students reported that he sexually abused them within the three-year period he taught at Queensland capital Brisbane's Marist College Ashgrove. Butler had received sex abuse complaints in between 1991 and 1993. Provincial of the Marist Brothers in Australia, Brother Peter Carroll, delivered an apology at the royal commission's public hearing.

=== New Zealand ===
The abuse scandal at the Marylands School is an important chapter in the clerical abuse affairs in New Zealand but other cases have also emerged.

== South America ==
=== Argentina ===
On 17 August 2019, Argentina Bishop Sergio Buenanueva of San Francisco, Cordoba, acknowledged the history of sex abuse in the Catholic Church in Argentina. Buenanueva, who was labeled as a "Prelate" by the Argentine Catholic Church, also stated that the church's sex abuse crisis in Argentina, which is Pope Francis's native country, was "just beginning". On 15 July 2020, it was revealed that a lawyer had issued criminal charges against Archbishops Eduardo Martin of Rosario and Sergio Fenoy of Santa Fe de la Vera Cruz for seeking to "supplant the public prosecutor's office" by encouraging complaints to another body.

A Network of Survivors of Ecclesiastical Abuse in Argentina has been set up.

Archdiocese of La Plata

Accused Diocese of Mendoza priest Nicola Corradi was charged by authorities in Buenos Aires province of sexually abusing children at a school in La Plata. The Antonio Provolo Institute for the Deaf in Mendoza province, where Corradi was also accused of molesting children, kept secret archives in the province's city of La Plata. The La Plata school where Corradi is accused of molesting children is also a sister school to the Antonio Provolo Institute. Corradi was later convicted for the Mendoza sex abuse charges and received a prison sentence of 42 years.

Diocese of Orán

On 10 June 2019, former Orán Bishop Gustavo Zanchetta was criminally charged with sexually abusing two seminarians. Zanchetta, who was one of Pope Francis's first appointments in his home country, was first accused of "strange behaviour" in 2015 when pornographic pictures, including naked selfies, were found on his phone. In August 2017, Pope Francis required Zanchetta to resign as Bishop of Orán, citing "health reasons", but then appointed him to serve as Assessor, or Councilor, to the Administration of the Patrimony of the Apostolic See. He was barred from leaving the country, had to undergo a psychiatric evaluation, and faced up to ten years in prison if convicted. On 28 May 2019 Pope Francis said a Holy See trial would begin soon. A anonymous local priest told Crux on 13 August 2019 that the diocese had "not one, not two, not three, but several" cases of sex abuse. On 28 August 2019, it was announced that Zanchetta's travel ban had been lifted and that he had returned to Rome.

On 7 November 2019, the main offices of the Diocese of Oran were raided by police as part of a different investigation of Zanchetta for financial fraud. On 27 November 2019, Zanchetta returned voluntarily to Argentina and appeared in court earlier than required. A judge once again allowed Zanchetta to return to the Vatican provided he inform the court if he changed his address.

Zanchetta denied the charges and said that he was a victim of revenge by priests in Orán with whom he had differences. On 4 March 2022 he was found guilty of sexually abusing two seminarians and sentenced to four and a half years' imprisonment.

Diocese of Morón

In 2009, Julio Grassi was found guilty (by a three-judge panel of the Criminal Court Oral 1 Morón) of one count of sexual abuse and one count of corrupting a minor in the "Happy Children’s Foundation".

Archdiocese of Santa Fe de la Vera Cruz

Allegations of sexual abuse by Archbishop Edgardo Storni on 47 young seminarists surfaced in 1994 and were published in 2000. This led to a victim from a 1992 incident coming forward, followed by a conviction for eight years in December 2009.

Archdiocese of Mendoza

- In 2016, two priests, Nicola Corradi and Horacio Corbacho, and three other men employed at one of the Antonio Provolo Institute for the Deaf's Argentine schools were arrested in Mendoza, Argentina in 2016 for abuse of children. Corradi had previously been accused as early as 2009 of committing sex abuse at the Antonio Provolo Institute for the Deaf's main campus in Verona, Italy. On 6 May 2017, Argentine authorities charged Japanese nun Sr Kosaka Kumiko with abusing children at the very same Argentine school as well, and also for covering up sex abuse committed by the two priests as well. On 15 June 2019, it was announced that the two priests will stand trial on 5 August 2019. The two priests will face trial in Argentina, where they were jailed after being accused of sexually abusing 22 children at the Argentine school. Former institute employee Armando Gomez also would serve as a co-defendant. The trial began as scheduled. Former institute employee Jorge Bordón had been sentenced to 10 years in prison in 2018 for sex abuse at the institute as well.
- On 25 November 2019, priests Nicola Corradi, 83, and Horacio Corbacho, 59, were each found guilty of sexually abusing deaf children at a Catholic school for the deaf in Luján de Cuyo from 2004 to 2016. They were sentenced to 42 and 45 years in prison respectively. Their gardener Armando Gómez was jailed for 18 years. Aside from Gómez, several other school faculty, including Kumiko, have been jailed for complicity since the abuse allegations surfaced in 2016. At the time of the convictions, Kumiko was still being held in prison awaiting trial.
- Two monks from the archdiocese's Christ at Prayer Monastery in the town of Tupungato were arrested on 27 December 2018 and charged with sexually abusing one boy and one adult male between 2009 and 2015. The monks, Diego Roque and Oscar Portillo, were originally from Buenos Aires and have led the monastery since its founding in 1996. Both monks will remain under house arrest until trial. The sex abuse allegations against the two monks, who still remain in custody, forced the Archdiocese to close the monastery, which then had only four monks, "until further notice" in January 2019.

=== Brazil ===
Diocese of Anápolis

- Tarcísio Tadeu Spricigo was arrested after his checklist for choosing victims was found and given to police. He had molested children in at least five parishes. The case was one of those featured in an episode of the BBC's Panorama documentary series titled Sex Crimes and the Vatican and became an example of the Vatican's policies regarding pedophile priests. In November 2005 he was sentenced to a prison term of over 14 years.
- Felix Barbosa Carreiro was arrested and charged with child sexual abuse in the northeastern state of Maranhão after police seized him in a hotel room with four teenage boys.

Archdiocese of Penedo

- In 2010, authorities in Brazil began an investigation into three priests after a video allegedly showing a priest sexually abusing an altar boy was broadcast on the SBT television station.

=== Chile ===
Archdiocese of Santiago

- José Andrés Aguirre Ovalle, aka "Cura Tato", was found guilty of nine sexual abuse charges by the highest court of this country. In 2004 Aguirre was sentenced to 12 years in jail. At the beginning of this trial, the Catholic Church was sentenced to pay 50 million in damages to the victims, but then this sentence was revoked by the supreme court.
- Ricardo Muñoz Quinteros, priest of Melipilla, was charged in 2010 with eight cases of sexually abusing minors, including his own daughter. Quinteros is also being investigated for producing pornographic material involving children.
- In 2010, the Catholic Church began an investigation into sexual abuse allegedly committed by Fernando Karadima, after four people came forward with allegations of abuse. He was found guilty and convicted by the Holy See on 18 February 2011. He was sentenced to a life of prayer and penitence, banned from any contact with his ex parishioners and forbidden to perform any priestly ministry in public or private except for mass by himself. Karadima has never acknowledge any of the charges pressed agoints him and has declared innocent until this day. On 28 September 2018, Pope Francis issued a communique ordering the laicisation of Karadima
- In 2018, a lawsuit was filed against the Archdiocese of Santiago for allegations of covering up sex abuse committed by Karadima On 27 March 2019, however the Court of Appeals ordered the Archdiocese to pay 100 million pesos (about US$147,000) for "moral damages" to each of the survivors: Juan Carlos Cruz, José Andrés Murillo and James Hamilton. The ruling was confirmed by their lawyer Juan Pablo Hermosilla and Santiago Bishop Celestino Aos on 28 March.

Diocese of Valparaíso

- Eduardo Olivares Martínez, was found guilty of a five sexual abuse against underprivileged minors. In 2006 was sentenced to 3 years in jail and to pay 15 million pesos in damages.
- In 2010, Juan Henríquez Zapata was indicted for using minors for sex services.

Diocese of Rancagua

- Jorge Galaz Espinoza, former Director of El Pequeño Cottolengo, was found guilty of repeated violations against two mentally disabled minors. In 2005 Galaz was sentenced to 15 years in jail.

Diocese of Punta Arenas

- Jaime Low Cabezas, was found guilty of a sexual abuse against a 15-year-old minor. In 2009 Low was sentenced to 3 years in jail.
- Víctor Hugo Carrera, was found guilty of a sexual abuse against one minor. In 2005 Carrera was sentenced to 541 days in jail and to pay 2 million pesos in damages to the family of the victim. The case involved the bishop of the diocese, who was accused of protecting Carrera and facilitating his escape to Bolivia, where he lived for two years.

Marist Brothers Education Facilities

- Cristián Precht Bañados, was suspended from ministry from 2012 to 2017 after he was found guilty of sexually abusing minors and vulnerable adults at Marist Brothers facilities he visited. Was later laicised by Pope Francis in 2018
- Miguel Ortega was also found guilty of sexually abusing children at Marist Brothers facilities, including different schools. He died in 2015.
- In 2017, it was revealed that at least 14 minors were abused by Marist Brother Abel Perez from the 1970s until 2000 at the Instituto Alonso de Ercilla and the Marcelino Champagnat schools in Chile. Perez confessed the alleged abuse to his superiors in 2010, and was then transferred to Peru.

Society of Jesus

- Rev. Stefan Dartmann, the superior of the Jesuit order in Germany, disclosed that an abusive teacher in Germany had been guilty of similar crimes in Jesuit schools in Chile and Spain, and that the order had systematically covered it for over 25 years. This teacher left the order in 1991, after it went public that he forced boys to have sex at a boys school in Berlin from 1975 to 1983. The offender now lives in Chile and has written several letters of apology to his victims, acknowledging every crime, but prosecutors said the crimes have happened too long ago to bring charges.
- In August 2019, revelations surfaced that Jesuit Renato Poblete, who died in 2010, had sexually abused 18 adult women and four underage female minors. He also impregnated at least one of these women and forced her to have an abortion. One of the minors he abused was only three years old and a daughter of one of his adult victims as well.

=== Peru ===
In 2007, Daniel Bernardo Beltrán Murguía Ward, a 42-year-old Sodalitium Christianae Vitae (SCV) consecrated layman was found by the National Police in a hostel in Cercado de Lima with a 12-year-old boy, of whom he was taking sexually explicit pictures. The boy was initially lured by Murguía Ward in Miraflores, where he was given Pokémon figures in exchange for photos of his intimate parts. When Murguía Ward was caught, he had paid the boy 20 soles (US$7) for his services in the hostel. The police have reported that pictures of two other boys were also found on Murguía Ward's camera and that the boy has claimed he received oral sex from Murguía Ward. These charges have been denied by the accused. Murguía Ward has since been removed from the SCV for his alleged misconduct.

=== Venezuela ===
In 2022, a scandal unfolded in Venezuela after the American newspaper The Washington Post published a report detailing an original investigation in Catholic priests in Venezuela who were accused and/or convicted of sexual abuse. The report revealed that of the at least 10 Catholic priests accused and/or convicted of sexual abuse between 2001 and 2022, three served little or no time in sentence and returned to priesthood. The Washington Post mentioned cases that occurred in Anzoátegui, Falcón, Lara, Mérida and Zulia, although there have been complains in at least eleven states in Venezuela.

The Church confirmed the veracity of the report, admitting the existence of cases of abuse that same year, announcing an investigation and actions to prevent sexual abuse in the future. This scandal follows others that occurred in Mexico, Argentina, Chile, Colombia and Peru.

== See also ==
Sexual abuse cases in Catholic church

- Catholic Church sex abuse cases
- Settlements and bankruptcies in Catholic sex abuse cases
- Catholic Church sex abuse cases in Australia
- Catholic Church sex abuse cases in Belgium
- Catholic Church sexual abuse cases in Canada
- Catholic Church sexual abuse cases in Dublin
- Catholic Church sex abuse cases in English Benedictine Congregation
- Catholic Church sexual abuse cases in Ireland
- Catholic sexual abuse cases in New Zealand
- Catholic Church sex abuse cases in the United States
- Parish transfers of abusive Catholic priests

Sexual abuse cases in other Christian denominations

- Abuses in the Baptist Faith
- Jehovah's Witnesses and child sex abuse

Critique & consequences related topics

- Criticism of Pope John Paul II
- Debate on the causes of clerical child abuse
- Ecclesiastical response to Catholic sex abuse cases
- Instruction Concerning the Criteria for the Discernment of Vocations with Regard to Persons with Homosexual Tendencies in View of Their Admission to the Seminary and to Holy Orders
- Media coverage of Catholic sex abuse cases
- Sex Crimes and the Vatican, BBC documentary
- Survivors Network of those Abused by Priests, NGO for victims in USA

Investigation, prevention and victim support related topics

- Broken Rites Australia, support and advocacy group in Australia
- National Review Board, USA
- National Society for the Prevention of Cruelty to Children, UK
- Pontifical Commission for the Protection of Minors
- Sexual Addiction & Compulsivity, peer-reviewed journal on prevention & treatment
- Virtus (program), church initiative in USA
- Vos estis lux mundi, church procedure for abuse cases

Other related topics

- Child sexual abuse
- Clerical celibacy
- Homosexual clergy in the Catholic Church
- Pontifical secret
- Religious abuse
- Spiritual abuse
