= Settlements and bankruptcies in Catholic sex abuse cases =

Financial consequences of cases

Settlements and bankruptcies in Catholic sex abuse cases have affected dioceses, whose compensation payments have totaled in the billions of dollars.

== Estimates by Donald Cozzens ==
According to Donald Cozzens, "by the end of the mid 1990s, it was estimated that... more than half a billion dollars had been paid in jury awards, settlements and legal fees." This figure grew to about one billion dollars by 2002. Roman Catholics spent around $615 million on sex abuse cases in 2007.

== Payments to victims ==
Date	Diocese	Charges made against	Amount	Number of Victims	Comments	Notes
1994, May	Lincoln, NE		$40,000	1		
1997	Dallas, TX	Rudolph Kos	$31 million		Originally $119.6 million via jury award. On appeal reduced.	
2003, Jun	Louisville, KY	34 priests, two religious brothers, and three lay people	$25.7 million	240		
2003, Sep	Boston, MA	140 priests and two others	$85 million	552		
2004	Davenport, IA	Reverend William Wiebler (12 victims) and others	$9 million	37		
2004, Jul 6	Portland, OR		$53 million (more than)	100 (over)	Filed for bankruptcy, Chapter 11.	
2004, Sep	Tucson, AZ		$22.2 million	50 (over)	Filed for Chapter 11 bankruptcy, after reaching an agreement with its victims	
2004, Dec	Spokane, WA		$48 million (at least)		Filed for bankruptcy, payment was a part (has to be approved by judge and victims)	
2005, Jan 3	Orange, CA	30 priests, 2 nuns and 11 others	$100 million	87	In 1997, Bishop Tod Brown himself was accused of having sexually abused a 12-year-old boy in 1965 as pastor in Bakersfield. Church officials dismissed the claims and he denied the allegation. Eleuterio Ramos 11 cases, Siegfried Widera, who later committed suicide, 9 cases, 25 case uninvolved	
2006, Oct 10	Davenport, IA	Lawrence Soens		15	Filed for Chapter 11 bankruptcy, alleged victims were 15 students from 1960s who accused Bishop Soens who denied the accusations.	
2006, Dec	Phoenix, AZ	Priest Mark Lehman and teen minister Phil Baniewicz	$100,000	1 (William Cesolini)		
2006, Dec	Los Angeles, CA	22 priests	$60 million	45		
2007	Los Angeles, CA	Father Mark Falvey	$16 million	9	Ordered to pay.	
2007, Jan 15	Charleston, SC	26 priests (at least)	$12 million	many	Bishop Robert J. Baker agreed to pay.	
2007, Jul 16	Los Angeles, CA		$660 million	508 (over)	Archbishop Roger Mahony and the Los Angeles diocese apologized for abuses by priests describing them as "terrible sin and crime", after settling with over 508 alleged victims	
2007, Sep 7	San Diego, CA	Robert Brom	$198.1 million	144	Filed for Chapter 11 protection, hours before the first of about 150 lawsuits about childhood abuse was due to be heard—it became the largest diocese to seek bankruptcy protection.	
2008, Mar 7	Fairbanks, AK			130	Filed for bankruptcy due to monetary concerns over 130 lawsuits made by Alaska natives claiming to have been abused by priests, and other church employees.	
2008, May 29	Sacramento, CA	Frs. Arthur & Mark Falvey	$100,000	1	The Jesuit religious order paid $100,000 to a person who alleged he was raped and molested from age 7–11 at St Ignatius Parish, by identical twin brother priests Fr. Arthur Falvey of Sacramento, and Fr. Mark Falvey of Los Angeles.	
2009, Feb	Memphis, TN	Fr Juan Carlos Duran	$2 million	1	Fr. Duran had previous sexual history with minors in St. Louis, Panama and Bolivia.	
2009, Oct	Savannah, GA	Wayland Brown	$4.24 million	1		
2014	Los Angeles, CA		$13 million	17		
2018, Sept	Brooklyn, NY	Angelo Serrano	$27.5 million	4	At this time, largest settlement against the Catholic Church and second largest individual sum paid.	
2018, Dec	Saint Paul and Minneapolis, MN		$210 million	450	Largest bankruptcy settlement in the country; $40 million from the archdiocese and parishes, $170 million from insurers	
2024	Los Angeles, CA	300 of clergy members (approximately)	$880 million	1,350		

== Bankruptcies ==
=== Portland ===
Citing monetary concerns arising from impending trials on sex abuse claims, the Archdiocese of Portland (Oregon) filed for Chapter 11 bankruptcy on July 6, 2004, hours before two abuse trials were set to begin, becoming the first Roman Catholic diocese to file for bankruptcy. If granted, bankruptcy would mean pending and future lawsuits would be settled in federal bankruptcy court. The archdiocese had settled more than a hundred previous claims for a sum of over $53 million. The filing seeks to protect parish assets, school money and trust funds from abuse victims; the archdiocese's contention is that parish assets are not the archdiocese's assets. Plaintiffs in the cases against the archdiocese have argued that the Catholic Church is a single entity, and that the Vatican should be liable for any damages awarded in judgment of pending sexual abuse cases.

=== Tucson ===
The Diocese of Tucson filed for bankruptcy in September 2004. The diocese reached an agreement with its victims, which the bankruptcy judge approved June 11, 2005, specifying terms that included allowing the diocese reorganization to continue in return for a $22.2 million settlement.

=== Spokane ===
In December 2004, the Diocese of Spokane, Washington agreed to pay at least $48 million as compensation to those abused by priests as part of its bankruptcy filing. This payout has to be agreed upon by victims and another judge.

=== Davenport ===
On October 10, 2006, the Diocese of Davenport filed for Chapter 11 protection. The decision to file for bankruptcy was driven by many claims which focused on Bishop Lawrence Soens, who had been accused of fondling as many as 15 students during his tenure as priest and principal at Regina Catholic High School in Iowa City during the 1960s. Soens denies the allegations. A judge discharged one suit in October 2006.

=== San Diego ===
On February 27, 2007, the Diocese of San Diego filed for Chapter 11 protection, hours before the first of about 150 lawsuits was due to be heard. San Diego became the largest diocese to postpone its legal problems in this way.

=== Fairbanks ===
On March 7, 2008, the Diocese of Fairbanks filed for bankruptcy after 130 civil suits filed by Alaska natives who claim to be abused by priests, and other church employees, beginning in the 1950s.

=== Oregon Province of the Jesuits ===
In February 2009, the Society of Jesus' Oregon Province, which also was based in other states, filed for Chapter 11 bankruptcy as well. The Province agreed in 2011 to pay $166 million to sex abuse victims.

=== Wilmington ===
On October 18, 2009, the Diocese of Wilmington filed for bankruptcy as the first of some eight lawsuits (of more than 100 potential) was scheduled to go to trial the next day.

=== Congregation of Christian Brothers (North America) ===
In 2011, the North American chapter of the Congregation of Christian Brothers filed for Chapter 11 bankruptcy due to the financial burden caused by sex abuse lawsuits. In 2013, the North American chapter agreed to pay approximately $16.5 million in damages to more than 400 men and women who were sexually or physically abused as children by members of the order. Between 2006 and 2011, the order had also paid approximately 25.6 million to victims in 50 abuse cases.

=== Milwaukee ===
On January 4, 2011, the Archdiocese of Milwaukee announced that it would be filing for bankruptcy. The church was facing more than 23 lawsuits, and attempts to reach a mediated settlement with victims failed in December 2010. This came two days before the bishop was scheduled to be deposed about these cases, and after the church had refused to release the names or personnel records of the priests accused. The opposing attorney said that the bankruptcy filing was an attempt to delay turning over church records on the cases.

The Milwaukee archdiocese has already paid out over $29 million to settle 200 cases over the last 20 years. They said that these additional cases would cause hefty legal fees that the archdiocese could not afford. The archdiocese has assets of about $98.4 million, but $90 million of that is restricted for specific uses.

=== Stockton ===
In 2014, the Roman Catholic Diocese of Stockton filed for Chapter 11 Bankruptcy. Under the bankruptcy agreement, which received court approval in 2017, a payout of 15 million was given to over two dozen sex abuses.

=== Ecclesiastical Province of Saint Paul and Minneapolis ===
- The Archdiocese of Saint Paul and Minneapolis filed for Chapter 11 bankruptcy reorganization on January 17, 2015.
- The Diocese of Duluth filed for Chapter 11 bankruptcy protection on December 7, 2015.
- On March 3, 2017, the Diocese of New Ulm filed for Chapter 11 bankruptcy protection following numerous lawsuits surrounding sex abuse by Catholic clergy in the area. New Ulm follows the Duluth Diocese and the Archdiocese of St. Paul and Minneapolis, thus making Minnesota the first state in the United States of America to have three Roman Catholic dioceses file for bankruptcy protection.
- The Roman Catholic Diocese of Saint Cloud announced on February 28, 2018, that it would file for bankruptcy amid claims of sex abuse. The Diocese then filed on March 5, 2019. On May 26, 2020, it was agreed that the Diocese could undergo bankruptcy if $22.5 million was forfeited to compensate 70 sex abuse survivors.
- In November 2018, the Roman Catholic Diocese of Winona-Rochester released a statement claiming that the Diocese would soon file for Chapter 11 bankruptcy due to the financial burden caused by ongoing sex abuse lawsuits. The Diocese then officially filed for bankruptcy in December 2018.

=== Archdiocese of Agaña ===
On January 15, 2019, it was announced that the Roman Catholic Archdiocese of Agaña in Guam filed for Chapter 11 bankruptcy due to the financial burden created by the overwhelming amount of sex abuse lawsuits.

=== Diocese of Rochester ===
On September 12, 2019, sex abuse lawsuits forced the Roman Catholic Diocese of Rochester for Chapter 11 Bankruptcy. The Diocese is the first Catholic diocese in the state of New York to file for bankruptcy and also the 20th Catholic diocese in the U.S. states to do so as well.

=== Diocese of Harrisburg ===
On February 19, 2020, the Diocese of Harrisburg filed for Chapter 11 bankruptcy protection after disclosing to federal bankruptcy court it has more than 200 creditors and estimated liabilities between $50 million and $100 million, with assets of less than $10 million. The Harrisburg Diocese was the first Catholic diocese in Pennsylvania to seek bankruptcy protection.

=== Diocese of Buffalo ===
On February 28, 2020, the Diocese of Buffalo filed for bankruptcy as a result of numerous sexual abuse lawsuits.

=== Archdiocese of New Orleans ===
On May 1, 2020, the Archdiocese of New Orleans filed for bankruptcy in part due to pending sex abuse lawsuits.

=== Others ===
- The Diocese of Gallup, New Mexico filed for bankruptcy protection on November 12, 2013.
- The Diocese of Helena filed for bankruptcy protection on January 31, 2014, to resolve more than 362 claims.
- The Diocese of Great Falls-Billings filed for bankruptcy protection in 2017.
- In 2017, the Minnesota and Arizona chapters of the order of Crosier Fathers and Brothers, which also serve as major locations for the order's United States chapter, filed for bankruptcy after agreeing to pay sex abuse victims $25.5 million.
- The Archdiocese of Santa Fe announced it would file for bankruptcy protection on November 29, 2018, and then did so in June 2019 to resolve 395 cases of sex abuse.

== See also ==
Sexual abuse cases in Catholic Church

- Catholic Church sex abuse cases
- Catholic Church sex abuse cases by country
- Catholic Church sex abuse cases in the United States
- William Kamm, leader of schismatic Catholic group convicted for sexual abuse

Critique & consequences related topics

- Criticism of Pope John Paul II
- Debate on the causes of clerical child abuse
- Ecclesiastical response to Catholic sex abuse cases
- Instruction Concerning the Criteria for the Discernment of Vocations with Regard to Persons with Homosexual Tendencies in View of Their Admission to the Seminary and to Holy Orders
- Media coverage of Catholic sex abuse cases
- Survivors Network of those Abused by Priests, NGO for victims in US

Investigation, prevention and victim support related topics

- Charter for the Protection of Children and Young People, US
- Essential Norms, US
- National Review Board, US
- Pontifical Commission for the Protection of Minors, Vatican
- Survivors Network of those Abused by Priests, US
- Virtus (program), church initiative in US
- Vos estis lux mundi, church procedure for abuse cases

Other related topics

- Child sexual abuse
- Clerical celibacy
- Pontifical secret
