= Te Ata =

Te Ata may refer to:

- Ngāti Te Ata, a Māori iwi (tribe)
- Te Atairangikaahu (1931–2006), Māori queen
- Te Ata (actress) (1895–1995), American Chickasaw Indian actress and story teller
- Te-Ata Reserve, a park in Atawhai, New Zealand
- Te Ata Kura, a book of poems by New Zealand writer Apirana Taylor

== See also ==
- Te Atatū (disambiguation), two adjacent suburbs in western Auckland, New Zealand
