= Magnus Murray (Catholic priest) =

Magnus William ("Max") Murray (13 May 1927 – 9 January 2024) was a laicised Catholic priest, school teacher and convicted child sex offender in New Zealand. He was a prominent figure in New Zealand discussion of Catholic Church sexual abuse cases. In 2003, Murray admitted 10 charges relating to offending against four Dunedin boys between 1958 and 1972. He was jailed for five years, but served less than three. He was ordained in 1949. He taught at St Paul's High School in Dunedin until 1972. He was "removed at the first hint of a problem in 1972" and went to Australia voluntarily for therapy. He had been stationed at St Bernadette's Church, in St Clair and later at St Mary's Church, in Mosgiel. Following his removal to Australia, he served as a priest in Woollahra parish, in Sydney. He returned to New Zealand in 1976 and worked briefly in Te Atatū, Te Puke, Mt Maunganui, Tauranga and Kaikohe, then six years as a parish priest in Waihi followed by four years in Ngāruawāhia before retiring in 1990. He lived in a rest home where he was being treated for dementia. He was laicised in 2019. There had been criticism of the 15-year delay in that process. Murray was from Gore. Magnus William Murray died on 9 January 2024.
