= Survivors Network of those Abused by Priests =

American non-profit organization

The Survivors Network of those Abused by Priests, known as SNAP, established in 1989, is a 501(c)(3) non-profit organization support group of survivors of clergy sexual abuse and their supporters, founded in the United States. Barbara Blaine, a survivor of sex abuse by a priest, was the founding president. SNAP, which initially focused on the Roman Catholic Church, had 12,000 members in 56 countries as of 2012. It has branches for religious groups, such as SNAP Baptist, SNAP Orthodox, and SNAP Presbyterian, for non-religious groups (Scouts, families), and for geographic regions, e.g., SNAP Australia and SNAP Germany.

Shaun Dougherty was elected to serve as the president in July 2021 and remained president as of April 2024. Tim Lennon was a past president.

== History ==
SNAP's history and list of current staff and directors are on their website.

== Activities ==
On June 13, 2002, SNAP's David Clohessy addressed the U.S. Conference of Catholic Bishops at its high-profile meeting in Dallas, Texas. He asserted that many church-going Catholics had strong concerns about the way in which bishops were handling the growing child sexual abuse scandal. Clohessy said, "We're not here because you want us to be. We're not here because we've earned it or have fought hard for it. We're here because children are a gift from God, and Catholic parents know this! That's why 87% of them think that if you've helped molesters commit their crimes, you should resign." In 2004, SNAP acknowledged accepting donations from leading attorneys who had represented clients in abuse cases, but maintained that it did not direct clients to these attorneys.

On August 8, 2009, former Oklahoma Governor Frank Keating, who served as the first chair of the National Review Board established by the U.S. Catholic bishops to investigate clergy sex abuse, addressed SNAP's annual gathering. He admitted he was at first naïve about the scope of child sexual abuse in the Catholic Church and urged bishops who covered up crimes to be prosecuted.

In 2009 SNAP supported a legislative bill in New York that would push Catholic Church dioceses to disclose the names of all clergy who have been transferred or retired due to "credible allegations" of abuse.

On June 9, 2009, a group of survivors of clergy abuse protested the appointment of Joseph Cistone as bishop of the Saginaw, Michigan diocese.

Retired Auxiliary Bishop Thomas Gumbleton of the Archdiocese of Detroit is a member and strong supporter of SNAP and has helped SNAP do fundraising work. According to the National Catholic Reporter, Gumbleton was punished by the Vatican and removed as a parish pastor because of work he did with SNAP and concerns he had about the Church's response to child sexual abuse.

SNAP's president, Barbara Blaine, and national director, David Clohessy, resigned from their SNAP positions, effective February 4, 2017, and December 31, 2016, respectively. According to the Chicago Tribune, "Barbara Dorris, SNAP's outreach director, has become the managing director". Three other longtime leaders, board president Mary Ellen Kruger and outreach director Barbara Dorris, both of St. Louis, and board member Mary Dispenza, left in March 2018.

In 2025 SNAP launched a database on cardinals’ records on clergy sex abuse.

== Defamation lawsuit and sanctions ==
In 2015 SNAP was ordered by US District Court Judge Carol E. Jackson to release information on alleged sex abuse victims, during the discovery process of a defamation suit by an accused priest against whom charges were dropped.

According to David Clohessy, the director and spokesman, it is the most significant legal battle facing the organization in its 23 years and that he personally may be fined or jailed. SNAP refused to fully comply with the judge's order, claiming "rape crisis center privilege". In August 2016, Judge Jackson found that no such privilege exists and imposed sanctions against SNAP. The judge found that SNAP had defamed him and conspired against the priest and ordered that SNAP pay the priest's legal fees. SNAP's attorney stated they were considering an appeal.

== Hammond v. SNAP ==
On January 18, 2017, a former fundraiser for SNAP, Gretchen Rachel Hammond, filed a whistleblower lawsuit against the organization in Cook County, Illinois. Hammond had been employed by SNAP as a Director of Development from July 2011 through February 2013. In the lawsuit, Hammond alleged that SNAP fired her in retaliation for confronting the organization for "colluding with survivors' attorneys." The lawsuit stated that "SNAP does not focus on protecting or helping survivors—it exploits them. SNAP routinely accepts financial kickbacks from attorneys in the form of 'donations.' In exchange for the kickbacks, SNAP refers survivors as potential clients to attorneys, who then file lawsuits on behalf of the survivors against the Catholic Church." According to the Catholic News Agency, the lawsuit claimed that SNAP "receives 'substantial contributions' from attorneys sometimes totaling more than 40 or 50 percent of its annual contributions. A prominent Minnesota attorney who represents clergy abuse survivors reportedly donated several six-figure annual sums, including over $415,000 in 2008. Other unnamed attorney-donors who represent abuse survivors reportedly came from California, Chicago, Seattle, and Delaware." The lawsuit also cited emails sent by David Clohessy and Barbara Blaine to survivors and "prominent attorneys".

In one such email, Clohessy urges a survivor to sue the Wisconsin archdiocese "i sure hope you DO pursue the WI [Wisconsin] bankruptcy ... Every nickle (sic) they don't have is a nickle (sic) that they can't spend on defense lawyers, PR staff,gay-bashing, women-hating, contraceptive-battling, etc."

SNAP denied the allegations. Outreach Director Barbara Dorris told the St. Louis Post-Dispatch, "That's simply just not true," outreach director Barbara Dorris said about misrepresenting the best interest of abuse victims. "We have been and always will be a self-help support group for victims." Dorris added that she couldn't remember if Hammond, who is currently a journalist for the LGBT paper Windy City Times in Chicago, had been fired or not. SNAP president Barbara Blaine issued a statement which read "The allegations are not true. This will be proven in court. SNAP leaders are now, and always have been, devoted to following the SNAP mission: To help victims heal and to prevent further sexual abuse." On January 24, 2017, the Chicago Sun Times reported that Clohessy "voluntarily resigned" from SNAP "effective Dec. 31", according to a two-paragraph email from SNAP Board Chairwoman Mary Ellen Kruger. Clohessy told the Kansas City Star "that the lawsuit had nothing to do with his resignation and called the allegations in the case 'preposterous.'" Blaine died in 2017. The lawsuit was settled in early 2018. Clohessy returned to SNAP as a spokesperson.

== New Zealand chapter ==
In 2019, SNAP opened up a chapter in New Zealand. The New Zealand chapter called SNAP Aotearoa New Zealand was founded and is led by Catholic theologian Dr Christopher Longhurst. SNAP Aotearoa was a core participant in the New Zealand Royal Commission of Inquiry into Historical Abuse in State Care and in the Care of Faith based Institutions. In the 2025 Birthday Honours (New Zealand), Dr Longhurst was awarded the honor of Companion of the King's Service Order (KSO) for services to survivors of abuse in care.

== See also ==
Sexual abuse cases in church

- Abuses in the Baptist Faith
- Catholic Church sex abuse cases
- Catholic Church sex abuse cases in the United States
- Jehovah's Witnesses and child sex abuse
- Sexual abuse cases in Southern Baptist churches

Critique and consequences related topics

- Debate on the causes of clerical child abuse
- Ecclesiastical response to Catholic sex abuse cases
- Instruction Concerning the Criteria for the Discernment of Vocations with Regard to Persons with Homosexual Tendencies in View of Their Admission to the Seminary and to Holy Orders
- Settlements and bankruptcies in Catholic sex abuse cases
- Sex Crimes and the Vatican, BBC documentary
- Spotlight, a 2015 film about The Boston Globe's "Spotlight" team, and its 2001 investigation into cases of widespread and systemic child sex abuse in the Boston area by numerous Catholic priests. It features Phil Saviano, founder of the New England chapter of SNAP.

Investigation, prevention and victim support related topics

- Charter for the Protection of Children and Young People, US
- National Review Board, US
- Pontifical Commission for the Protection of Minors, Vatican
- Virtus (program), church initiative in US
- Vos estis lux mundi, church procedure for abuse cases
