= William Kamm =

Australian child abuser and sect leader

William Kamm, also known as "The Little Pebble" (born 1950 in Cologne, West Germany), is the founder and leader of a religious group in Australia called the "Order of St Charbel" (or sometimes referred to as "The Community") named after the Maronite saint Charbel Makhlouf. Even as a fringe Christian sect, he claims his order is a part of the Roman Catholic Church while the Maronite Church and the Holy See do not regard the group as being part of Roman Catholicism. He was released from prison after serving 9 years of a 10-year prison sentence/term for the rape and assault of a teenager.

== Controversies ==
=== Conviction for sexual assault charges ===
On 14 October 2005, Kamm was sentenced to five years in prison with a non-parole period of 3 1/2 years for a string of sexual attacks including aggravated sexual assault on a 15-year-old girl. He claimed that she was one of his 84 mystical wives. The assaults occurred when the girl was living within Kamm's Order of St Charbel, a community (living in a compound) near Nowra, New South Wales. Kamm claimed to have received advice from the Virgin Mary that the girl should be chosen as one of 12 queens and 72 princesses who would all become his wives, with whom he would spawn a new human race after the world was cleansed and burnt by a ball of fire. Kamm's letters and diary entries to the 15-year-old girl, which were made public during the court session, display an explicit sexual style and were major evidence in his prosecution.

Kamm was also found guilty in May 2007 of aggravated sexual assault and aggravated indecent assault in relation to another 15-year-old girl. In August 2007, after losing an appeal on his original sentence, Kamm was re-sentenced to a total of 15 years imprisonment with a non-parole period of 11 years. He was due to become eligible for release on parole on 13 April 2013, but was refused. In November 2014 parole was granted. Upon his release, the New South Wales government applied for an Extended Supervision Order in the Supreme Court of NSW. His lawyer, Omar Juweinat opposed the application which resulted in six years of litigation. In 2021, the Supreme Court upheld the appeal and allowed Kamm to return to his property.

=== Papal aspirations and prophecies ===
Kamm was also noted for a series of unusual reputed prophecies which were never fulfilled (including the start of World War III). Kamm claimed that Pope John Paul II, who remains widely venerated throughout Kamm's movement, would consecrate Kamm a bishop and appoint him as his official and sole successor to the papacy. When this prophecy was unfulfilled on Pope John Paul's death in 2005, Kamm quickly issued a press statement, saying "heaven clearly changed its plans" and declaring, that they would accept Pope Benedict XVI as legitimate Roman Pontiff. They claim prophecies have changed and stated that Kamm is to be the successor to Benedict XVI, instead of to John Paul II as previously claimed. One of Kamm's claims is that Pope John Paul II will rise from the dead and reappear on the surface of the world again to fight evil along with Benedict XVI and possibly to appoint Kamm.

== Personal life and release from prison ==
Kamm was married to Bettina Kamm. His former wife, who reportedly lives at the St Charbel compound near Nowra, condemned him, but said followers still revered him as their prophet. They have a son (born 1999) from the relationship.

Kamm was conditionally released from prison in 2014 after serving nine years of his 10-year sentence. Conditions specify that he may not have unsupervised contact with people below 18. Since his release, Kamm married for a third time, to a woman who was a long-time member of his religious community. Media reports speculate that Kamm is believed to have fathered more than 20 children during his days as a cult leader.

In November 2021, he was back in custody after allegedly contacting teenage girls via social media, with the court hearing that he allegedly used his wife’s Facebook account to send messages to the females.

The then 71-year-old was charged with four counts of failing to comply with a supervision order.

On 22 November 2022, Kamm faced a court in Sydney. He pleaded guilty, and was released with time served after spending a year and six days on remand. His supervision order was suspended while he was in custody but will resume upon his release.

== See also ==
- Child sexual abuse in Australia
- Catholic Church sex abuse cases in Australia
- Catholic Church sex abuse cases by country
