= Te Atatū =

Te Atatū may refer to:

- Te Atatū Peninsula, a suburb of Auckland
- Te Atatū South, a suburb of Auckland
- Te Atatū (New Zealand electorate), a parliamentary electorate in West Auckland
