= Sexual abuse scandal in the English Benedictine Congregation =

The sexual abuse scandal in the English Benedictine Congregation was a significant episode in the series of Catholic sex abuse cases in the United Kingdom. The dates of the events covered here range from the 1960s to the 2010s.

== Abuse at Benedictine monasteries ==
=== St Benedict's School ===
In April 2006, civil damages were awarded jointly against Dom David Pearce, a former head of the junior school at St Benedict's School, Ealing, and Ealing Abbey in the High Court in relation to an alleged assault by Dom Pearce on a pupil while teaching at the school in the 1990s, although criminal charges were dropped. He was subsequently charged in November 2008 with 24 counts of indecent assault, sexual touching and gross indecency with six boys aged under 16. The counts related to incidents before and after 2003, when the law was changed to create an offence of sexual touching. After admitting his guilt at Isleworth Crown Court to offences dating back to 1972, Pearce was jailed for eight years in October 2009.

The conduct of the Ealing monastic community, as trustee of the St. Benedict's Trust, was examined by the Charity Commission, which found that it had failed to take adequate measures to protect beneficiaries of the charity from Dom Pearce.

In 2011, there was an allegation of cover-up involving Ealing Abbey and abuse towards a female pupil at St Gregory's Roman Catholic Primary School, a state school in Woodfield Road, Ealing, with links to the abbey. The abuse is alleged to have occurred in the 1970s.

In October 2017, Andrew Soper (known as Father Laurence), former abbot of Ealing Abbey, was found guilty on 19 sexual offences against pupils of St Benedict's school in the 1970s and 1980s.

=== Buckfast Abbey ===
Father Paul Couch was jailed for ten years in 2007, on two counts of serious sexual assault and 11 of indecent assault. He had committed the offences against six boys between 1972 and 1993 during two periods at Buckfast Abbey Preparatory School in Devon; he was a Royal Navy chaplain from 1978 until 1983 and again from 1992.

Father William Manahan pleaded guilty in 2007 at Exeter Crown Court to eight charges of sexually assaulting pupils at the same school between 1971 and 1978, and was jailed for 15 months. The school closed in 1994.

=== Ampleforth College ===
In 1995, Fr Bernard Green, then a housemaster at Ampleforth College, was arrested after indecently assaulting a sleeping boy in one of the school's dormitories. He received two years' probation for an incident which was said to have "petrified" the boy concerned.

In 2005, Fr Piers Grant-Ferris admitted 20 incidents between 1966 and 1975 including beating boys bare-handed on the buttocks, and taking temperatures rectally. The Yorkshire Post reported in 2005 that former Abbot Basil Hume did not call in police when the initial incident came to light in 1975, but removed Father Grant-Ferris. Several other incidents came to light in 2003, when the abbey hired a psychologist to conduct risk assessments on staff.

=== Belmont Abbey ===
Father John Kinsey of Belmont Abbey, Herefordshire was sentenced to five years at Worcester Crown Court in 2005 by Judge Andrew Geddes for a series of serious offences relating to assaults on schoolboys attending Belmont Abbey School in the mid-1980s. Due to falling pupil numbers, the school closed in the early 1990s.

=== Douai Abbey ===
David Smith, jailed May 2007, was an assistant housemaster at Douai School, Upper Woolhampton, West Berkshire, from 1975. He sexually abused three boys in one year at the school and continued to sexually abuse as an Anglican priest from 1981, sexually abusing a series of boys over a 30-year period.

Roman Catholic Benedictine monk/priest, Father Michael Creagh was jailed in November 2017 for two counts of child sexual abuse while he was a house master in 1987 at Douai School. He had previous convictions for paedophilic offences, committed elsewhere in the 1970s.

David Lowe, a paedophile and serial sexual abuser, had sexually abused young boys, firstly, at Westminster Cathedral Choir School, London, and, secondly at the Roman Catholic Benedictine Ampleforth College in Yorkshire. Subsequent to and despite his history, he moved to Douai Abbey. A married man and a father, Lowe was appointed Deputy Headmaster at the school in the 1990s, and there is no suggestion that he sexually abused at Douai. Lowe was jailed for 10 years in 2015 for indecent assaults.

Father Terence Charles Fitzpatrick, Roman Catholic priest/monk of Douai School, whilst he was Roman Catholic parish priest at St Osburg's Roman Catholic church in Coventry, sexually abused a woman, Pamela Brown, between 1989 and 1991. She had psychological issues and approached him for guidance. Fitzpatrick duped her into performing sexual activity "games" under the pretense that they were part of the help she required from him, and stating that the sexual activity was carried out in the name of God. Brown was awarded damages at Birmingham County Court. Fitzpatrick returned to Douai Abbey and continued to serve four Roman Catholic parishes in Berkshire.

The Douai Abbey school closed in 1999.

=== Downside School ===
In 2004, a Benedictine monk was jailed for 18 months after taking indecent images of schoolboys and possessing child pornography when he was a teacher at Downside School. In January 2012, Father Richard White, a monk who formerly taught at the school, was jailed for five years for gross indecency and indecent assault against a pupil in the late 1980s. White, 66, who was known to pupils as Father Nick, had been allowed to continue teaching after he was first caught abusing a child in 1987 and was able to go on to groom and assault another pupil in the junior school. He was placed on a restricted ministry after the second incident, but was not arrested until 2010. Two other Downside monks, also former teachers, received police cautions during an 18-month criminal trial.

In November 2017, the national Independent Inquiry into Child Sexual Abuse (IICSA) started to examine evidence of children being targeted for abuse at the school, along with another major Catholic school Ampleforth Abbey, as part of its investigation into the prevalence of paedophilia in the English Benedictine Congregation and its failures in protecting young people over many decades. IICSA heard that children at the two schools could still be "at risk". The enquiry heard evidence that in 2012, the then headmaster, Father Leo Maidlow Davis, who was the senior monk at Downside Abbey from 2014 until 2018, made trips with a loaded wheelbarrow to a distant part of its grounds, where he made a bonfire, destroying staff files dating back to the early 1980s that might have contained evidence of child abuse at the school.

Father Charles Fitzgerald-Lombard, abbot of Downside from 1990 to 1998, was among three Downside abbots accused by Father Aidan Bellenger, in a private letter, of tolerating child abuse. Father Aidan, abbot from 2006 to 2014, said his predecessors "protected and encouraged" paedophile monks. Wrongdoers at the school were quietly moved between Benedictine monasteries and parishes. Reference was made to instructions from Rome to destroy documents that were damaging to priests. Father Leo insisted that his decision to make a bonfire of Downside's staff files was prompted by a desire to "get rid of unnecessary old material". He accepted that the files should, under safeguarding requirements, have been kept for 70 years, conceding that he may have unintentionally destroyed information about child abuse.

As recommended by the IICSA report, a new charitable company was set up for the school in 2019 to separate it from the monastery. In 2020 it was reported that the abbey had sold paintings at auction for over £400,000 to defray legal costs.

=== Worth Abbey ===
Worth Abbey and Worth School were initially created as the preparatory school for Downside. In 1995, Father Andrew Brenninkmeyer was suspended following complaints that he had sexually abused other monks, including Father Jonathan Monckton, who left the monastery in 1987 after no action was taken against Father Brenninkmeyer. Father Moncton was not the only complainant.

In 2001, Father John Bolton was suspended for hugging a boy inappropriately. Father John died on 26 June 2013. The headmaster at the time was Father Christopher Jamison, who is currently Abbot President of the English Benedictine Congregation. On 5 June 2018, the IICSA determined that its case study of the English Benedictine Congregation would not include Worth School and Abbey because the evidence in regard of Downside and Ampleforth is sufficient to address the English Benedictine Congregation.
