= Criticism of Pope John Paul II =

Pope John Paul II was criticised for, amongst other things, an alleged lack of response to child sex abuse in the Catholic Church.

== Child sex abuse scandals ==
John Paul II was criticised by members of the abuse victims' group Survivors Network of those Abused by Priests (SNAP), for failing to respond appropriately to the sex abuse crisis. In 2002, he wrote that "there is no place in the priesthood and religious life for those who would harm the young". The Church instituted reforms to prevent future abuse by requiring background checks for Church employees and, because a significant majority of victims were teenage boys, disallowing ordination of men with "deep–seated homosexual tendencies". They now require dioceses faced with an allegation to alert the authorities, conduct an investigation and remove the accused from duty.

In addition to cases of abuse, much of the scandal has focused around members of the Catholic hierarchy who did not report abuse allegations to the civil authorities. In many cases they reassigned those accused to other locations where they continued to have contact with minors. In defending their actions, some bishops and psychiatrists contended that the prevailing psychology of the times suggested that people could be cured of such behavior through counseling. Members of the church hierarchy have argued that media coverage has been excessive. In response to the widening scandal, Pope John Paul II emphasised the spiritual nature of the offenses. He declared in 2001 that "a sin against the Sixth Commandment of the Decalogue by a cleric with a minor under 18 years of age is to be considered a grave sin, or delictum gravius." With the approval of the Vatican, the hierarchy of the church in the United States said that it instituted reforms to prevent future abuse including requiring background checks for Church employees and volunteers, while opposing extensions of the statutes of limitations in sex abuse cases.

== Opus Dei and Legion of Christ controversies ==
John Paul II was criticised for his support of the Opus Dei prelature and the 2002 canonisation of its founder, Josemaría Escrivá, whom he called the saint of ordinary life.

=== Legion of Christ ===
John Paul II has been criticised for hindering the investigation into the charges of sexual immorality leveled against Father Marcial Maciel Degollado. This is despite the fact that Maciel was already under investigation by the Vatican in 1956 for drug addiction when he established the Legionaries in Ireland. At the time the Vatican had removed him as superior of the Legionaries and was investigating allegations that he abused morphine.

Allegations about Maciel began resurfacing in the 1980s but were consistently ignored by the Vatican hierarchy, which approved bylaws for the group that effectively banned internal criticism of Maciel and allowed a personality cult to flourish around him. He was eventually found to have molested many seminarians and abused children he had fathered with different women despite his vows of chastity. Campaigners accuse John Paul II more generally of putting the interests of the Catholic Church above all and turning a blind eye to child sex abuse allegations.

== Birth control and gender roles ==
John Paul II's defense of teachings of the Catholic Church regarding gender roles, sexuality, euthanasia, artificial contraception and abortion came under criticism. Some Christian feminists challenged views of his on the role of women in society, including the ordination of women.

The legacy of Pope John Paul II is vibrant and extraordinary, yet painfully inconsistent. The contradiction in his legacy lies in his teaching and actions on the dignity of women. John Paul II called for women to be included as decision makers in secular governments. However, when it came to bringing women into the decision making bodies of his church, he slammed the door in our faces, barring us from ordination and locking the door by stating the discussion about women’s ordination is closed.

— Aisha Taylor, Women's Ordination Conference 2005

== Problems with traditionalists ==
In addition to all the criticism from those demanding modernisation, traditionalist Catholics sometimes denounced him as well. These issues included demanding a return to the Tridentine Mass and repudiation of the reforms instituted after the Second Vatican Council, such as the use of the vernacular language in the formerly Latin Roman Rite Mass, ecumenism, and the principle of religious liberty. He was also accused by these critics for allowing and appointing liberal bishops in their sees and thus silently promoting Modernism, which was firmly condemned as the "synthesis of all heresies" by his predecessor Pope Pius X. In 1988, the controversial traditionalist Archbishop Marcel Lefebvre, founder of the Society of St. Pius X (1970), was excommunicated under John Paul II for the unapproved consecration of four bishops, which was called by the Holy See a "schismatic act".

The World Day of Prayer for Peace, with a meeting in Assisi, Italy, in 1986, in which the Pope prayed only with the Christians, was heavily criticised as giving the impression that syncretism and indifferentism were openly embraced by the Papal Magisterium. When a second 'Day of Prayer for Peace in the World' was held in 2002, it was condemned as confusing the laity and compromising to "false religions". Likewise criticised were his kissing of the Qur'an in Damascus, Syria, on one of his travels on 6 May 2001. His call for religious freedom was not always supported; bishops like Antônio de Castro Mayer promoted religious tolerance, but at the same time rejected the Vatican II principle of religious liberty as being liberalist and already condemned by Pope Pius IX in his Syllabus errorum (1864) and at the First Vatican Council.

Some Catholics opposed his beatification and canonization for the above reasons.

== Religion and AIDS ==
John Paul's position against artificial birth control, including the use of condoms to prevent the spread of HIV, was harshly criticised by doctors and AIDS activists, who said that it led to countless deaths and millions of AIDS orphans. However, Edward C. Green, director of the AIDS Prevention Research Project at the Harvard Center for Population and Development Studies said "We have found no consistent associations between condom use and lower HIV-infection rates, which, 25 years into the pandemic, we should be seeing if this intervention was working. James Shelton, of the US Agency for International Development, said that one of the ten damaging myths about the fight against AIDS is that condoms are the answer. Shelton wrote that "Condoms alone have limited impact in generalised epidemics [as in Africa]". Critics have also claimed that large families are caused by lack of contraception and exacerbate Third World poverty and problems such as street children in South America. The Catholic Agency for Overseas Development published a paper stating "Any strategy that enables a person to move from a higher-risk towards the lower end of the continuum, [we] believe, is a valid risk reduction strategy."

== Centralisation ==
John Paul II was criticised for recentralising power back to the Vatican following what some viewed as a decentralisation by Pope John XXIII. As such he was regarded by some as a strict authoritarian. Conversely, he was also criticised for spending far too much time preparing for and undertaking foreign travel. The frequency of his trips, it was said, not only undermined the "specialness" of papal visits, but took him away from important business at the Vatican and allowed the Church, administratively speaking, to drift and rot within. Especially in South America, he was criticised for conservative bias in his appointments of bishops; with an unusually long reign of over 25 years, the majority of bishops in place at his death had been appointed by him.

== Opposition to his beatification ==
Some Catholic theologians disagreed with the call for beatification of Pope John Paul II. Eleven dissident theologians, including Jesuit professor Jose Maria Castillo and Italian theologian Giovanni Franzoni raised several points, including his stance against contraception and the ordination of women as well as the Church scandals that presented "facts which according to their consciences and convictions should be an obstacle to beatification".

== See also ==
- Criticism of Beatification of Pope John Paul II
- Alfredo Ormando, Italian writer who self-immolated in Vatican City in 1998 in protest of the Vatican's stance on homosexuality
