= Debate on the causes of clerical child abuse =

The debate on the causes of clerical child abuse is a major aspect of the academic literature surrounding Catholic sex abuse cases.

== Moral relativism ==
In 2010, Pope Benedict XVI published a letter (in German and then translated into English) in which he provided a unified perspective on several issues that, together, he believes contributed to the sexual abuse scandal. One of the chief reasons put forth by the Pope was the push by several prominent theologians for a relativistic perspective on morality where "there could no longer be anything that constituted an absolute good, any more than anything fundamentally evil; (there could be) only relative value judgments."

== Seminary training/admissions ==
Clergy themselves have suggested their seminary training offered little to prepare them for a lifetime of celibate sexuality.

A report submitted to the General Assembly of the Synod of Bishops in Rome in 1971, called The Role of the Church in the Causation, Treatment and Prevention of the Crisis in the Priesthood by Dr. Conrad Baars, a Roman Catholic psychiatrist, and based on a study of 1,500 priests, suggested that some clergy had "psychosexual" problems. Though the report suggested that immediate corrective action was needed, making ten recommendations, no implementation of the report's detailed recommendations followed. One of those most active in the Synod at the time was Cardinal Wojtyła, who on October 16, 1978, was elected Pope John Paul II.

== Impact of psychology from previous decades ==
Some bishops and psychiatrists have asserted that the practice of returning pedophile priests to their position in the clergy may have been due to the prevailing psychological theories of the time, which suggested that people could be cured of such behavior through counseling. Thomas G. Plante of Stanford University and Santa Clara University wrote: "Almost all the cases coming to light today are cases from 30 and 40 years ago. We did not know much about paedophilia and sexual abuse in general back then. In fact, the vast majority of the research on sexual abuse of minors didn't emerge until the early 1980s. So, it appeared reasonable at the time to treat these men and then return them to their priestly duties. In hindsight, this was a tragic mistake." Robert S. Bennett, the Washington attorney who headed the National Review Board's research committee, named "too much faith in psychiatrists" as one of the key problems concerning Catholic sex abuse cases. About 40 percent of the abusive priests had received counseling before being reassigned.

A report done as part of the Australian government's Royal Commission into Institutional Responses to Child Sexual Abuse found that "the most notorious cases of sexual abuse in the Australian church occurred in institutional settings in the 1940s–60s by men (and sometimes women) who were thoroughly trained in the strict morality and rigorous piety of the pre-Vatican II church," noting that "the ranks of abusers cuts right across the lines of conservatives and liberals, with both sides having their fair share of abusive clergy."

== Supply and demand theory ==
It has been argued that the shortage of priests in North America, Europe, Australia and New Zealand caused the Roman Catholic hierarchy to act in such a way to preserve the number of clergy and ensure that sufficient numbers were available to serve the congregation despite serious allegations that these priests were unfit for duty.

== Pedophilia and ephebophilia ==
Sexual Addiction & Compulsivity: The Journal of Treatment and Prevention (Cimbolic & Cartor, 2006) noted that because of the large share of post-pubescent male minors among cleric victims there is need to further study the differential variables related to ephebophile versus pedophile offenders. Cartor, Cimbolic & Tallon (2008) found that 6 percent of the cleric offenders in the John Jay Report are pedophiles; 32 percent ephebophiles, 15 percent 11- and 12-year-olds only (both male and female), 20 percent indiscriminate, and 27 percent mildly indiscriminate. They also found distinct differences between the pedophile and ephebophile groups. They reported that there may be "another group of offenders who are more indiscriminate in victim choice and represent a more heterogeneous, but still a distinct offender category" and suggested further research to determine "specific variables that are unique to this group and can differentiate these offenders from pedophile and ephebophile offenders" so as to improve the identification and treatment of both offenders and victims.

== Gay priests and homosexuality ==
Rome's Congregation for Catholic Education issued an official document, the Instruction Concerning the Criteria for the Discernment of Vocations with regard to Persons with Homosexual Tendencies in view of their Admission to the Seminary and to Holy Orders (2005). The document has attracted criticism based on an interpretation that it implies homosexuality is associated with pedophilia and ephebophilia.

In a statement, read out by Archbishop Silvano Maria Tomasi in 2009, the Holy See stated that the majority of Catholic clergy who had committed acts of sexual abuse against under 18 year olds should not be viewed as pedophiles, but as homosexuals. The statement said that rather than pedophilia, "it would be more correct to speak of ephebophilia, being a homosexual attraction to adolescent males." The move angered many gay rights organizations and sex abuse victims groups, who claimed it was an attempt by the Vatican to redefine the Church's past problems with pedophilia as problems with homosexuality.

According to the John Jay Report 80.9% of the alleged abuse victims in the United States were male. This fact led Catholic League's William Donohue, to opine: "The conventional wisdom maintains there is a pedophilia crisis in the Catholic Church; I maintain it has been a homosexual crisis all along." Margaret Smith, a John Jay College criminologist who worked on the report, pointed out that it is "an unwarranted conclusion" to assert that the majority of priests who abused male victims are gay. Though "the majority of the abusive acts were homosexual in nature ... participation in homosexual acts is not the same as sexual identity as a gay man." She further stated that "the idea of sexual identity [should] be separated from the problem of sexual abuse. ... [A]t this point, we do not find a connection between homosexual identity and the increased likelihood of subsequent abuse from the data that we have right now."

All victims in the John Jay Report were minors, the "vast majority" age 13 or younger, considered prepubescent by the American Psychiatric Association. Research on pedophilia in general shows a majority of abusers identify themselves as heterosexual. Additionally the John Jay report noted that "the abuse decreased as more gay priests began serving the church."

Another researcher, Louis Schlesinger, argued that the main problem was pedophilia or ephebophilia, not sexual orientation and claimed that some men who are married to adult women are attracted to adolescent males.

Karen Terry, a second researcher, nonetheless stresses the importance of separating sexual identity and behavior. "Someone can commit sexual acts that might be of a homosexual nature but not have a homosexual identity", says Terry. Terry said factors such as greater access to boys is one reason for the skewed ratio. Smith also raised the analogy of prison populations where homosexual behavior is common even though the prisoners are not necessarily homosexuals, or cultures where men are rigidly segregated from women until adulthood, and homosexual activity is accepted and then ceases after marriage.

Analyzing a number of studies, Gregory M. Herek, a psychology professor at the University of California at Davis, concluded: "The empirical research does not show that gay or bisexual men are any more likely than heterosexual men to molest children. This is not to argue that homosexual and bisexual men never molest children. But there is no scientific basis for asserting that they are more likely than heterosexual men to do so. ... Many child molesters cannot be characterized as having an adult sexual orientation at all; they are fixated on children."

In an interview with CNN, James Cantor, Editor-in-Chief of Sexual Abuse: A Journal of Research and Treatment said, "It's quite solidly shown in the scientific literature that there is absolutely no association between being a gay man and being a pedophile."

Australian researcher Virginia Miller disputes these conclusions. According to Miller, the statistics provided in the John Jay Inquiry report do not support the hypothesis of situational abuse, most of the victims being first encountered in the General Church community. Moreover, Miller argues that "even if the only opportunities available were to abuse boys this would not demonstrate that there was no sexual orientation towards boys." She thinks that the Catholic inquiries are "somewhat naïve in respect of the history of paedophile promotion groups and gay activism in the seventies and, as a result, have denied that male-on-male child sexual abuse was in fact a problem and dismissed those who claim it was as blinded by prejudice against homosexuals."

== Clerical celibacy ==
There has been much discussion regarding the historical origins of clerical celibacy in the Catholic Church. Complete celibacy as a requirement for ordination to the Latin Catholic priesthood was firmly formalized during the 11th-century Gregorian Reform. In modern parlance, celibacy has come to be associated with the very specific practice of abstaining from sexuality. According to modern church teachings, clergy are expected to adhere to both these practices. Exceptions to this rule are sometimes made in very specific instances, such as married converts.

A 2005 article in the Western People, a conservative Irish newspaper, proposed that celibacy itself had contributed to the abuse problem. There is a suggestion that the institution of celibacy has created a "morally superior" status that is easily misapplied by abusive priests. According to this paper, "The Irish Church's prospect of a recovery is zero for as long as bishops continue blindly to toe the Vatican line of Pope Benedict XVI that a male celibate priesthood is morally superior to other sections of society." Christoph Schönborn and Hans Küng have also said that priestly celibacy could be one of the causes of the sex abuse scandals within the Catholic Church.

Most information available involves male adolescents of the age of 11 years and older which is the age group most frequently abused. It has been asserted that for some priests the development of their sexual feelings stopped changing when they entered celibacy, so they act as if they were adolescents themselves. An Australian public inquiry panel in 2015 claimed that priests being celibate may have also contributed to abuse. Expert witness at the Royal Commission, Dr Carolyn Quadrio said at the time that she did not believe celibacy drives child abuse, but rather men who see children as sex objects are drawn to the priesthood as a profession.

=== Advocacy for mandatory celibacy ===
Supporters of celibacy claim that Roman Catholic priests suffering sexual temptations are not likely to turn immediately to a teenage boy simply because Church discipline does not permit clergy to marry. Supporters of clerical celibacy suggest, then, that there is some other factor at work.

In the Eastern Rites of the Catholic Church, married men may become priests. Because priestly celibacy is a discipline, and not a doctrine of the Church, the discipline of celibacy within the Latin Rite may be lifted in the future, although that is currently unlikely. In the Latin Rite now, only a dispensation from the Vatican can allow clergy within the Latin Rite to marry, and such occasions are rare. The reintroduction of a permanent diaconate means that married men may become deacons in the Western rite but not become priests.

=== Revelations of widespread heterosexual sex among clergy ===
On February 19, 2019, the Vatican acknowledged that some clergy maintained their clerical state after violating their vow of celibacy and engaging in heterosexual sex. Some of these clergy had also fathered children. During the course of history, the Vatican also adopted rules to protect these clergy as well.

== Male culture of the church ==
Italian academic Lucetta Scaraffia wrote in L'Osservatore Romano that a greater presence of women in the Vatican could have prevented clerical sexual abuse from taking place; however, due to its nature of religious values, women are limited in its influence, so this is only a hypothesis.
