= Sex Crimes and the Vatican =

2006 television film

- Genre: Documentary
- Directed by: Sarah Macdonald
- Presented by: Colm O'Gorman
- Country of origin: United Kingdom

Original release
- Network: BBC
- Release: 1 October 2006

Sex Crimes and the Vatican (2006) is a documentary film (39 min) presented by the BBC programme Panorama. It aired on 1 October 2006.

== Allegations ==
Sex Crimes and the Vatican was filmed for the BBC's Panorama documentary series. It was directed by Sarah Macdonald, filmed by David Niblock and presented by Colm O'Gorman. The film charged that the Vatican used a secret document, Crimen sollicitationis, to silence allegations of sexual abuse by priests and that Crimen sollicitationis was enforced for 20 years by Joseph Cardinal Ratzinger before he became the Pope.

Crimen sollicitationis, subtitled "On the Manner of Proceeding in Cases of the Crime of Solicitation", is based on an earlier instruction of 1922 and was primarily concerned with dealing with the offense of sexual solicitation in Confession. Seventy of the seventy-four paragraphs dealt with establishing internal procedures for handling such cases in the curial court. The procedures having been established, they were then extended to included cases regarding homosexual conduct, any obscene act with preadolescent children, or animals, regardless if any of the prescribed activity had to do with the sacrament of penance.

Many Catholic bishops, priests and laity expressed anger at what they perceived as a clear bias against the church. They state that the programme made no effort to highlight the efforts made by the church in recent years to combat sex abuse, particularly the efforts taken by the English and Welsh Catholic Church under the leaderships of both Cormac Cardinal Murphy-O'Connor and Vincent Cardinal Nichols, Archbishop of Westminster. These two cardinals are involved in abuser cover-up cases.

== See also ==
- Roman Catholic sex abuse cases
- Roman Catholic priests accused of sex offenses
- Pontifical Secret
- Deliver Us from Evil (2006), a documentary about a sex abuse case in Northern California
- Twist of Faith (2005), an HBO documentary film about abuse in the Catholic Church
- Mea Maxima Culpa: Silence in the House of God (2012), another HBO documentary
