= Instruction Concerning the Criteria for the Discernment of Vocations with Regard to Persons with Homosexual Tendencies in View of Their Admission to the Seminary and to Holy Orders =

Official Catholic document published in 2005

Instruction Concerning the Criteria for the Discernment of Vocations with Regard to Persons with Homosexual Tendencies in View of Their Admission to the Seminary and to Holy Orders is a document published in November 2005 by the Congregation for Catholic Education, one of the top-level offices of the Catholic Church.

This document denies priestly ordination to men with "deep-seated homosexual tendencies".

While the preparation for this document had started ten years before its publication, this instruction was seen by many critics as a response by the Catholic Church to the clerical sexual abuse crisis. Some critics accused this document of implicitly linking homosexuality to the sexual abuse of children.

== Commentary and implications ==
The 1961 papal instruction Careful Selection And Training Of Candidates For The States Of Perfection And Sacred Orders (Religiosorum institutio) stated that "Advantage to religious vows and ordination should be barred to those who are afflicted with evil tendencies to homosexuality or pederasty, since for them the common life and the priestly ministry would constitute serious dangers." Bishops had discretion in allowing the further instruction of offending but penitent seminarians, and held homosexuals to the same standards of celibate chastity as heterosexual seminarians. There is no new moral teaching in the 2005 instruction: the instruction proposed by the document is rather towards enhancing vigilance in barring homosexuals from seminaries, and from the priesthood.

While the preparation for this document had started 10 years before its publication, this instruction is seen as an official answer by the Catholic Church to several sex scandals involving priests in the late 20th/early 21st century, including the American Roman Catholic sex abuse cases and a 2004 sex scandal in a seminary at St. Pölten (Austria). The document restricts discussion to homosexual candidates: as the vast majority of abuse victims were teenage boys, there is no specific instruction regarding nonchaste heterosexual candidates (the John Jay Report for instance, found that 81% of the victims of abuse in the United States were males, who were sexually abused by male priests).

Two months before his death in 2005, Pope John Paul II, troubled by the sex scandals in the US, Austria and Ireland, had written to the Congregation for Catholic Education: "Right from the moment young men enter a Seminary their ability to live a life of celibacy should be monitored so that before their ordination one should be morally certain of their sexual and emotional maturity."

== Reactions to the document ==
The document has attracted criticism based on an interpretation that the document implies that homosexuality is associated with pedophilia and the abuse of children.

It has also been asserted that, although the preparation for this document had started ten years before its publication, this instruction is seen as an official answer by the Catholic Church to clerical sexual abuse cases, which were causing a crisis in the Church.

There were some questions on how distinctions between deep-seated and transient homosexuality, as proposed by the document, will be applied in practice: the actual distinction that is made might be between those who abuse, and those who don't.

The Belgian college of Bishops elaborated that the sexual restrictions for seminary and priesthood candidates apply likewise for men of all sexual orientations. Archbishop Timothy Dolan of New York has been quoted as saying that the Vatican's directive was not tout court a "no-gays" policy.

In response to "numerous requests for clarification received by the Holy See", Pope Benedict XVI reiterated in 2008 that the Instruction applied to "all houses of formation for the priesthood".

== See also ==
- Homosexuality in the Roman Catholic priesthood
- Roman Catholic sex abuse cases
- Homosexuality and Roman Catholicism
- Gay bishops
