= Catholic Church sex abuse cases in the United States =

Instances and allegations of sex abuse by US Catholic clergy

There have been many lawsuits, criminal prosecutions and scandals over sexual abuse by Roman Catholic clergy in the United States of America.

The issue of child sexual abuse by Roman Catholic priests was first publicized in 1985 when a Louisiana priest plead guilty to 11 counts of molestation of boys. It was again brought to national attention in 2002, following an investigation by The Boston Globe which was later dramatized in the 2015 film Spotlight.

The issue became a nationwide scandal when it became clear that many of the allegations were true and that there was a pattern of cover-ups in several large dioceses across the United States. This created a crisis for the Catholic Church in the United States. Though sexual abuse by clergy members is not an issue unique to the United States, these cases were conspicuous due to the perceived leniency shown to offending clergy by church leadership and the Vatican.

Many of the accused priests were forced to resign or were laicized. In addition, several bishops who had participated in the cover-up were forced to resign or retire. Many culpable dioceses reached financial settlements with the victims, with payments estimated to have surpassed $4 billion in total as of 2024. The revelations nationwide led to a "zero tolerance" policy by the United States Conference of Catholic Bishops (USCCB). However, in December 2019, it was revealed that numerous Bishops across the United States withheld hundreds of names from their accused clergy list.

== Settlements ==
The Roman Catholic Diocese of Dallas paid $30.9 million in 1998 to twelve victims of abuse by one priest ($61 million in present-day terms).

In early 2002, The Boston Globe published results of an investigation titled "Spotlight Investigation: Abuse in the Catholic Church" that won a Pulitzer Prize. The investigation led to the criminal prosecutions of five Roman Catholic priests and brought the issue of child rape and sexual assault of Roman Catholic children to national attention. The coverage of these cases encouraged others to come forward with allegations of abuse, resulting in more lawsuits and criminal cases. In 2003, the Roman Catholic Archdiocese of Boston settled a large case for $85 million with 552 alleged victims.

In July 2003, the Roman Catholic Archdiocese of Louisville paid $25.7 million to "settle child sexual-abuse allegations made in 240 lawsuits naming 34 priests and other church workers."

In 2004, the Roman Catholic Diocese of Orange settled nearly 90 cases for $100 million.

In April 2007, the Roman Catholic Archdiocese of Portland in Oregon agreed to a $75 million settlement with 177 claimants and the Roman Catholic Archdiocese of Seattle agreed to a $48 million settlement with more than 160 victims. In July 2007, the Roman Catholic Archdiocese of Los Angeles reached a $660 million agreement with more than 500 victims; in December 2006, the archdiocese had a settlement of 45 lawsuits for $60 million. In September 2007, the Roman Catholic Diocese of San Diego reached a $198.1 million "agreement with 144 childhood sexual abuse victims".

In July 2008, the Roman Catholic Archdiocese of Denver agreed "to pay $5.5 million to settle 18 claims of childhood sexual abuse."

The Associated Press estimated the total from settlements of sex abuse cases from 1950–2007 to be more than $2 billion. BishopAccountability reports that the figure reached more than $3 billion in 2012.

Addressing "a flood of abuse claims," five dioceses (Tucson, Arizona; Spokane, Washington; Portland, Oregon.; Davenport, Iowa; and San Diego) filed for bankruptcy protection. Eight Catholic dioceses have declared bankruptcy due to sex abuse cases from 2004 to 2011.

In 2018, bankruptcy court approved an offer from the Archdiocese of Saint Paul and Minneapolis to pay victims of clergy sexual abuse a total of $210 million in settlement, which was the second largest settlement for any United States Catholic Diocese and the largest by any United States Catholic Diocese in bankruptcy.

On February 9, 2020, it was reported that five Catholic dioceses across the state of New Jersey had paid over $11 million to compensate 105 claims of sex abuse committed by Catholic clergy. Of these 105 claims, 98 were compensated through settlements. The payments also do not involve 459 other sex abuse cases in these dioceses which are still not resolved.

On May 5, 2020, the Roman Catholic Archdiocese of Philadelphia announced that it now expected to pay $126 million in reparations. The archdiocese also said its Independent Reconciliation and Reparations Program, which was established in 2018, has received a total of 615 claims, and had settled 208 of them for $43.8 million as of April 22, 2020. That averages out to about $211,000 per claim, which is in line with what other dioceses have been paying under similar programs. The same day, the total amount of money which the Archdiocese of Philadelphia expects to pay in sex abuse settlements was soon revised to $130 million.

The U.S. dioceses have tallied complaints from 17,000 victims to whom they paid about $4 billion since the 1980s. That figure could double given recent lookback laws that give them more time to sue.

In October 2024, the Roman Catholic Archdiocese of Los Angeles will pay $880 million to compensate 1,350 victims (who were minors at the time) of sexual abuse by approximately 300 of their clergy members dating back decades. This is the largest settlement involving the Catholic Church, and including the $740 million the LA Archdiocese had previously paid, the combined payout is set to total $1.5 billion.

== Scope and nature of the problem ==
Sexual abuse by priests occurs worldwide, although the overwhelming majority (approximately 80%) of reported cases of sexual abuse of minors occurs in the United States. In 2008, the Church asserted that the scandal was a severe problem. At the same time, the Church estimated that it was perpetrated by "no more than 1 percent" (or about 5,000) of the around 400,000 Roman Catholic priests worldwide. In 2002, following the revelations of sexual abuse in Boston, many Catholics and other commentators identified the abuse as being principally homosexual pederasty. There were cases in cities across the United States, including but not limited to Boston, Chicago, Eureka, California, Honolulu, Los Angeles, Orange County, Palm Beach, Philadelphia, Portland, Oregon, and Toledo, Ohio.

=== John Jay Report ===
In 2002, the United States Conference of Catholic Bishops (USCCB) commissioned the John Jay College of Criminal Justice to conduct a comprehensive study based on surveys completed by the Roman Catholic dioceses in the United States. The product of the study, titled the John Jay Report, indicated that at least 10,000 allegations had been made against 4,392 priests in the United States. This number constitutes approximately 4% of the priests who had served during the period covered by the survey (1950–2002). Of the abused, 81% were male, and 19% were female, 22% were younger than age 11, 51% were between the ages of 11 and 14, and 27% were between the ages of 15 and 17 years when first abused. Within the youngest age group, 64% of abused children were male, while within the older age groups, 85% were male. 2,411 priests had a single allegation made against them, while 149 priests had 10 or more claims made against them.

Among the most controversial findings in the report, the number of abuse victims climbing through the 1960s, peaking in the 1970s and sharply declining from 1985 onwards.

The John Jay report identified that the number of sexual abuse cases increased in the 1960s, peaked in the 1970s, and declined from the 1980s until the conclusion of the study in 2002. There does not appear to be a single primary cause of the abuse patterns within the Catholic clergy; however, the report suggests that many of the abusive priests experienced childhood sexual abuse firsthand.

The report also found that the victims of clerics with a single accusation of abuse were more evenly divided between male and female and were more likely to be older. The report also identified some subsets of abusive behavior: pedophilia (96 priests) and ephebophilia (474 priests).

The John Jay study has been heavily criticized. Some critics deemed the studies inaccurate and considered the researchers ignorant.

=== Pennsylvania Grand Jury Report ===
In 2018, a grand jury in Pennsylvania issued a report of 884 pages stating that there were over 1,000 identifiable child victims of sexual abuse by over 300 priests in six of the eight Roman Catholic dioceses in Pennsylvania, while advising "that there were likely to be thousands more." Only two criminal charges were brought, as either the priests involved had died or the statute of limitations had run out, a situation the grand jury stated made them "sick". The grand jury recommended to the Pennsylvania Legislature that:

- the statute of limitations for child sexual abuse in Pennsylvania be eliminated
- the window for filing civil suits be expanded
- the laws requiring reporting of abuse be strengthened
- a requirement be put into law mandating that any non-disclosure agreement include the statement that a non-disclosure agreement does not (and legally can not) prohibit victims from talking to law enforcement

The grand jury found that Church officials followed a "playbook for concealing the truth", minimizing the abuse by using words like "inappropriate contact" instead of "rape". State Attorney General Josh Shapiro, whose office initiated the investigation, said in a news conference, "They protected their institution at all costs. As the grand jury found, the church showed a complete disdain for victims."

The Vatican has declined to respond to the grand jury report detailing decades of sexual abuse and cover-ups by priests and bishops in Pennsylvania, refusing even to say whether church officials in Rome have read the damaging documents.

== Actions of the Catholic hierarchy ==
Historically, the Church has typically addressed sexual abuse as an internal matter, not reported to civil authorities. Abusive priests were usually sanctioned under canon law and sometimes received treatment from specialized Catholic service agencies. For example, 6,000 pages of documents released in a Milwaukee court case showed a pattern of ongoing abuse by a large number of priests who were being systematically switched to different assignments while church administrators failed to inform secular law enforcement agencies.

=== Offenders reported to authorities ===
Some, but relatively few, offenders were reported to civil authorities.

=== Abusers moved to different locations ===
The Church was widely criticized when it was discovered that some bishops knew about the crimes committed, but reassigned the accused instead of seeking to have them permanently removed from the priesthood. In defense of this practice, some have pointed out that public school administrators acted in a similar manner when dealing with teachers accused of sexual misconduct, as did the Boy Scouts of America.

Some bishops have been heavily criticized for moving offending priests from parish to parish, where they still had personal contact with children, rather than seeking to have them permanently removed from the priesthood. Instead of reporting the incidents to police, many dioceses directed the offending priests to seek psychological treatment and assessment.

In response to these allegations, defenders of the Church's actions have suggested that in reassigning priests after treatment, bishops were acting on the best medical advice then available, a policy also followed by the US public school system when dealing with accused teachers. Some bishops and psychiatrists have asserted that the prevailing psychology of the times suggested that people could be cured of such behavior through counseling. Many of the abusive priests had received counseling before being reassigned. Critics have questioned whether bishops are necessarily able to form accurate judgments on a priest's recovery. The priests were allowed to resume their previous duties with children only when the bishop was advised by the treating psychologists or psychiatrists that it was safe for them to resume their duties.

==== Accused clergy allowed to leave country ====
On March 6, 2020, a joint investigation conducted by ProPublica and the Houston Chronicle was published which revealed that the Catholic Church transferred more than 50 credibly accused U.S. Catholic clergy to other countries after sex abuse accusations surfaced against them.

=== Failure to report alleged criminal acts to police ===
Sexual abuse has been institutionalized, routinized and tolerated by the church hierarchy for decades. American professor of religion Anthea Butler says that in these actions the church acted as a criminal syndicate, and many believe that the Catholic Church is guilty of a grave moral failure for allowing massive sexual abuse of children. In response to the failure to report abuse to the police, lawmakers have changed the law to make reporting of abuse to police compulsory. An example of this can be found in Massachusetts, USA.

=== Handling of evidence ===
William McMurry, a Louisville, Kentucky lawyer, filed suit against the Vatican in June 2004 on behalf of three men allegedly abusing as far back as 1928, accusing Church leaders of organizing a cover-up of cases of sexual abuse of children. In November 2008, the United States Court of Appeals in Cincinnati denied the Vatican's claim of sovereign immunity and allowed the case to proceed. The Vatican initially stated that it did not plan to appeal the ruling.

== Awareness of the problem ==
Some date the current sexual abuse scandal to an article published in the National Catholic Reporter in 1985. After that, the scandal remained at the fringes of public attention but did not become a point of national attention until the mid-1990s when a number of books were published on the topic. The topic became the focus of intense scrutiny and debate after The Boston Globe published a series of articles covering cases of sexual abuse.

In 2002, criminal charges were brought against five Roman Catholic priests in Boston, (John Geoghan, John Hanlon, Paul Shanley, Robert V. Gale and Jesuit priest James Talbot) which ultimately resulted in the conviction and sentencing of each to prison. The ongoing coverage of these cases by The Boston Globe thrust the issue of sexual abuse of minors by Catholic priests into the national limelight. The coverage of these cases encouraged other victims to come forward with their allegations of abuse resulting in more lawsuits and criminal cases.

== Prosecution by civil authorities ==
In June 2012, Msgr. William J. Lynn, of the archdiocese of Philadelphia, became the first senior official convicted in the United States for covering up the sexual abuse of children by priests he oversaw. Lynn was convicted of child endangerment for, as the official in charge of handling abuse complaints, reassigning known abusers to new parishes instead of keeping them away from children. He was sentenced to three to six years in prison.

The largest numbers of sex abuse cases have been in the United States; some have led to multimillion-dollar settlements with many claimants. The Roman Catholic Diocese of Dallas paid $30.9 million in 1998 to twelve victims of one priest. In July 2003, the Roman Catholic Archdiocese of Louisville paid $25.7 million to "settle child sexual-abuse allegations made in 240 lawsuits naming 34 priests and other church workers." In 2003, the Roman Catholic Archdiocese of Boston also settled a large case for $85 million with 552 alleged victims.

In 2004, the Roman Catholic Diocese of Orange settled nearly 90 cases for $100 million. In April 2007 the Roman Catholic Archdiocese of Portland in Oregon agreed to a $75 million settlement with 177 claimants and the Roman Catholic Archdiocese of Seattle agreed to a $48 million settlement with more than 160 victims. In July 2007 the Roman Catholic Archdiocese of Los Angeles reached a $660 million agreement with more than 500 alleged victims, in December 2006, the archdiocese had a settlement of 45 lawsuits for $60 million. In September 2007 the Roman Catholic Diocese of San Diego reached a $198.1 million "agreement with 144 childhood sexual abuse victims".

In July 2008, the Roman Catholic Archdiocese of Denver agreed "to pay $5.5 million to settle 18 claims of childhood sexual abuse." The Associated Press estimated the total from settlements of sex abuse cases from 1950–2007 to be more than $2 billion. According to the United States Conference of Catholic Bishops (USCCB), that figure reached more than $2.6 billion in 2008. Addressing "a flood of abuse claims", five dioceses (Tucson, Arizona; Spokane, Washington; Portland, Oregon; Davenport, Iowa, and San Diego) got bankruptcy protection. Eight Catholic dioceses have declared bankruptcy due to sex abuse cases from 2004 to 2011.

On December 3, 2020, New York City priest Fr. George Rutler, the prestigious pastor of the Church of St. Michael in Manhattan who gained notoriety for criticizing high-profile Irish politician Leo Varadkar's homosexuality, was arrested on charges of groping female security guard Ashley Gonzalez. Rutler, considered a conservative icon, had made numerous appearances on EWTN and had written 30 books.

== Response of the Church ==
Although many cases could not be prosecuted because the statute of limitations in civil law, the Church's canon law allows for the prosecution of many of those cases.

The Catholic Church responded to the scandal at three levels: the diocesan level, the episcopal conference level and the Vatican. Responses to the scandal proceeded at all three levels in parallel with the higher levels becoming progressively more involved as the gravity of the problem became more apparent.

Before The Boston Globe coverage of the sexual abuse scandal in the Boston archdiocese, handling of sexual abuse allegations was largely left up to the discretion of individual bishops. After the number of allegations exploded following the Globe's series of articles, bishops in the United States felt compelled to coordinate a response at the episcopal conference level.

Although the Vatican did not respond immediately to the series of articles published by The Boston Globe in 2002, it has been reported that Vatican officials were monitoring the situation in the United States closely. Over time, it became more apparent that the problem warranted greater Vatican involvement.

=== Diocesan responses to the problem ===
The response to allegations of sexual abuse in a diocese was largely left to the bishop or archbishop. Many of the accused priests were forced to resign or were laicized. In addition, several bishops who had participated in the cover-up were forced to resign or retire.

The dioceses in which abuse was committed made financial settlements with the victims totaling over $1.5 billion as of March 2006. The number and size of these settlements made it necessary for the dioceses to reduce their ordinary operating expenses by closing churches and schools. In many instances, dioceses were forced to declare bankruptcy as a result of the settlements.

=== Initial response of the Vatican ===
On April 30, 2001, John Paul II issued a letter stating that "a sin against the Sixth Commandment of the Decalogue by a cleric with a minor under 18 years of age is to be considered a grave sin, or 'delictum gravius.'"

John F. Allen Jr., Vatican correspondent for the National Catholic Reporter, has commented that many American Catholics saw the Vatican's initial silence on The Boston Globe stories as showing a lack of concern or awareness about the issue. However, Allen said that he does not know anyone in the Roman Curia who was not horrified "by the revelations that came out of the Globe and elsewhere" or that "would defend Cardinal Law's handling of the cases in Boston" or "would defend the rather shocking lack of oversight that revealed itself [although] they might have different analyses of what should have happened to him". Allen described the Vatican's perspective as being somewhat skeptical of the media handling of the scandal. In addition, he asserted that the Vatican viewed American cultural attitudes toward sexuality as being somewhat hysterical as well as exhibiting a lack of understanding of the Catholic Church.

No one [in the Vatican] thinks the sexual abuse of kids is unique to the States, but they do think that the reporting on it is uniquely American, fueled by anti-Catholicism and shyster lawyers hustling to tap the deep pockets of the church. And that thinking is tied to the larger perception about American culture, which is that there is a hysteria when it comes to anything sexual, and an incomprehension of the Catholic Church. What that means is that Vatican officials are slower to make the kinds of public statements that most American Catholics want, and when they do make them they are tentative and half-hearted. It's not that they don't feel bad for the victims, but they think the clamor for them to apologize is fed by other factors that they don't want to capitulate to.

In April 2002, Pope John Paul II called to Rome the U.S. cardinals, plus the president and vice president of the (United States Conference of Catholic Bishops) USCCB. The pope asserted that "there is no place in the priesthood or religious life for those who would harm the young." The meeting's participants drew up a final statement, which called for a set of national standards for dealing with sexual abuse of minors by priests and new procedures for dismissing from the clerical state those found guilty of that crime.

=== Relations between the Vatican and American Catholics ===
According to John Allen Jr., Vatican correspondent for the National Catholic Reporter, cultural differences between the Vatican and American Catholics have complicated the process of formulating a comprehensive response to the sexual abuse scandal. Allen asserted that the sexual abuse crisis illustrated that "there is a lot about the American culture and the American Church that puzzles people in the Vatican, and there is much about the Vatican that puzzles Americans and English speakers generally."

=== Response of the US Conference of Catholic Bishops ===
As the breadth and depth of the scandals became apparent in dioceses across the United States, it became apparent to American bishops that a joint response was warranted at the episcopal conference level. John F. Allen Jr. characterized the reaction of the USCCB as calling for "swift, sure and final punishment for priests who are guilty of this kind of misconduct." In contrast to this, Allen characterized the Vatican's primary concern as wanting to make sure "that everyone's rights are respected, including the rights of accused clergy" and wanting to affirm that it is not acceptable to "remedy the injustice of sexual abuse with the injustice of railroading priests who may or may not be guilty."

According to Bishop Blase J. Cupich, then Bishop of Rapid City, by 2008, the U.S. church had trained 5.8 million children to recognize and report abuse. It had run criminal checks on 1.53 million volunteers and employees, 162,700 educators, 51,000 clerics and 4,955 candidates for ordination. It had trained 1.8 million clergy, employees and volunteers in creating a safe environment for children.

In 2019, more than 2.6 million background checks were conducted on clergy, employees and volunteers, and more than 2.6 million adults and 3.6 million youths were trained on identifying warning signs of abuse and how to report them. Survivors Network of those Abused by Priests, which advocates for survivors of clergy sex abuse, expressed concern about a section of the report indicating that only 60% of parishes nationwide were performing safety audits on their own.

==== Charter for the Protection of Children and Young People ====
In June 2002, the USCCB unanimously promulgated a Charter for the Protection of Children and Young People, sometimes referred to as the Dallas Charter. The charter committed the Catholic Church in the U.S. to the goal of providing a "safe environment" for all children and youth participating in activities sponsored by the Church. To accomplish this, the U.S. bishops pledged to establish uniform procedures for handling sex-abuse allegations against lay teachers in Catholic schools, parish staff members, coaches and other people who represent the Church to young people.

The thrust of the charter was the adoption of a "zero tolerance" policy for sexual abuse. The USCCB instituted reforms to prevent future abuse by requiring background checks for Church employees. They now require dioceses faced with an allegation to alert the authorities, conduct an investigation and remove the accused from duty. An audit of the Charter was completed in 2010.

In June 2014, the chairman of the USCCB's National Review Board reported that Bishop James Conley's Lincoln Diocese and three eparchies had yet to comply with the USCCB's charter requiring every diocese to submit its procedures for the protection of children to the Review Board for an audit.

==== Essential Norms ====
In June 2002, to ensure that each diocese/eparchy in the United States had "procedures in place to respond promptly to allegations of sexual abuse of minors", the USCCB also issued "Essential Norms for Diocesan/Eparchial Policies Dealing with Allegations of Sexual Abuse of Minors by Priest or Deacons". In October, the USCCB and the Holy See established a commission of four bishops from the Holy See and four bishops from the United States to review the norms. In November, the U.S. bishops were invited to accept the commission's work, but not to propose amendments. Following the document's approval, the USCCB issued the revised version of the norms. According to the USCCB, the Essential Norms constitute "'particular' canon law", that is, canon law for the Catholic bishops in the United States.

=== National studies ===
The National Review Board engaged the John Jay College of Criminal Justice of the City University of New York to conduct a study analyzing allegations of sexual abuse in Catholic dioceses in the United States. The time period covered by the John Jay study began in 1950 and ended in 2002. The product of the study was a report to the National Review Board titled "The Nature and Scope of the Problem of Sexual Abuse of Minors by Catholic Priests and Deacons in the United States" and commonly referred to as the "John Jay Report". It was published in February 2004.

The John Jay report indicated that some 11,000 allegations had been made against 4,392 priests in the USA. This number constituted approximately 4% of the 110,000 priests who had served during the period covered by the survey (1950–2002). The report found that, over the 52-year period covered by the study, "the problem was indeed widespread and affected more than 95 percent of the dioceses and approximately 60 percent of religious communities."

In 2008, the Church asserted that the scandal was a very serious problem but, at the same time, estimated that it was "probably caused by 'no more than 1 per cent' (or 5,000) of the over 500,000 Roman Catholic priests worldwide.

A second John Jay report, titled The Causes and Context of Sexual Abuse of Minors by Catholic Priests in the United States, 1950–2010, was published in May 2011.

==== Response of the laity ====
A study conducted by CARA in 2007 found that, although many Catholics are unaware of the specific steps that the church has taken, when informed of them, large majorities approve of these actions. 78% strongly approved of reporting allegations of sexual abuse by clergy to civil authorities and cooperating in civil investigations. 76% strongly approved of removing from ministry people credibly accused of sexual abuse of a minor.

=== Global extent ===
Although allegations of clergy sexual abuse have surfaced in several countries around the world, there have been no comprehensive studies which compare the relative incidence of sexual abuse in different areas. However, there is a general perception that the issue has been most prominent in the United States, and then in Australia, Canada and Ireland.

==== Number of allegations ====
The number of alleged abuses increased in the 1960s, peaked in the 1970s, declined in the 1980s and by the 1990s had returned to the levels of the 1950s.

Of the 11,000 allegations reported by bishops in the John Jay study, 3300 were not investigated because the allegations were made after the accused priest had died. 6700 allegations were substantiated, leaving 1000 which could not be substantiated.

According to the John Jay report, one-third of the accusations were made in the years 2002 and 2003. Another third of the allegations were reported between 1993 and 2001.

In consideration to the victims who reported their abuse, there are still many victims that have not reported their perpetrators and continue to survive with their experiences. In terms of children, data illustrates that the number of child-victims are "significantly underreported". According to academic journal Deviant Behavior, "Approximately 78% of the victims (male and females) were between the age of 11 and 17, 16% were between 8 and 10, and 6% were younger than 7".

==== Profile of the alleged abuses ====
The John Jay study found that, "Like in the general population, child sex abuse in the Catholic Church appears to be committed by men close to the children they allegedly abuse." According to the study, "many (abusers) appear to use grooming tactics to entice children into complying with the abuse, and the abuse occurs in the home of the alleged abuser or victim." The study characterized these enticements as actions such as buying minor gifts, letting the victim drive a car and taking youths to sporting events. The most frequent context for abuse was a social event and many priests socialized with the families of victims. Abuses occurred in a variety of places with the most common being the residence of the priest.

The John Jay report catalogued more than twenty types of sexual abuse ranging from verbal harassment to penile penetration. It said that most of the abusers engaged in multiple types of abuse. According to the report, only 9% of the accused performed acts limited to improper touching over the victim's clothes. Slightly more than 27% of the allegations involved a cleric performing oral sex and 25% involved penile penetration or attempted penile penetration, reported the study.

The study said sexual abuse "includes contacts or interactions between a child and an adult when the child is being used as an object of sexual gratification for the adult." The report categorized allegations of sexual abuse even if the allegation did not involve force or genital or physical contact.

==== Profile of the victims ====
The John Jay report found that 81% of the victims were male. 22% of victims were younger than age 10, 51% were between the ages of 11 and 14, and 27% were between the ages 15 and 17 years.

==== Profile of the abusers ====
In 2002, it was reported that at least 16 priests accused of sexually abusing children, including 12 in the United States, had killed themselves since 1986.

Half the priests were 35 years of age or younger at the time of the first instance of alleged abuse. Fewer than 7% of the priests were reported to have experienced physical, sexual or emotional abuse as children. Although 19% of the accused priests had alcohol or substance abuse problems, only 9% used drugs or alcohol during the alleged instances of abuse.

Over the period from 1890 to 2002, the majority of priests accused of sexual abuse were ordained in the mid-20th century, with 68% of all alleged abusers ordained between 1950 and 1979. The share of all accused priests by decade of ordination tripled from just 2% in the 1920s to 6% in the 1930s, doubling to 12% in the 1940s, and again to 23% in the 1950s. The number of alleged abusers peaked in the 1960s as over 25% of all accused priests were ordained between 1960 and 1969; another 20% of all accused clerics were ordained during the 1970s. But the number of accused tumbled precipitously to only 8% of priests ordained in the 1980s, and a mere 2% of all alleged abusers were ordained after 1990.

Of the priests who were accused of sexual abuse, 59% were accused of a single allegation. 41% of the priests were the subject of more than one allegation. Just under 3% of the priests were the subject of ten or more allegations. The 149 priests who had more than 10 allegations against them accounted for 2,960 of the total number of allegations.

=== 2003 Vatican Conference on Sexual Abuse ===
In April 2003, the Pontifical Academy for Life organized a three-day conference, entitled "Abuse of Children and Young People by Catholic Priests and Religious", where eight non-Catholic psychiatric experts were invited to speak to nearly all Vatican dicasteries' representatives. The panel of experts identified the following factors contributing to the sexual abuse problem:

- Failure by the hierarchy to grasp the seriousness of the problem.
- Overemphasis on the need to avoid a scandal.
- Use of unqualified treatment centers.
- Misguided willingness to forgive.
- Insufficient accountability.

=== Diocesan awareness of the problem ===
In response to criticism that the Catholic hierarchy should have acted more quickly and decisively to remove priests accused of sexual misconduct, contemporary bishops have responded that the hierarchy was unaware until recent years of the danger in shuffling priests from one parish to another and in concealing the priests' problems from those they served. For example, Cardinal Roger Mahony of the Archdiocese of Los Angeles, said: "We have said repeatedly that ... our understanding of this problem and the way it's dealt with today evolved, and that in those years ago, decades ago, people didn't realize how serious this was, and so, rather than pulling people out of ministry directly and fully, they were moved."

=== Diocesan response to allegations of sexual abuse ===
Some bishops have been heavily criticized for moving offending priests from parish to parish, where they still had personal contact with children, rather than seeking to have them permanently removed from the priesthood by defrocking. The Church was widely criticized when it was discovered that some bishops knew about some of the alleged crimes committed, but reassigned the accused instead of seeking to have them permanently removed from the priesthood.

In defense of this practice, some have pointed out that public school administrators engaged in a similar manner when dealing with accused teachers, as did the Boy Scouts of America.

Instead of reporting the incidents to police, many dioceses directed the offending priests to seek psychological treatment and assessment. According to the John Jay report, nearly 40% of priests alleged to have committed sexual abuse participated in treatment programs. The more allegations a priest had, the more likely he was to participate in treatment. From a legal perspective, the most serious criticism aside from the incidents of child sexual abuse themselves was by the bishops, who failed to report accusations to the police. In response to the failure to report abuse to the police, lawmakers have changed the law to make reporting of abuse to the police compulsory. In 2002, Massachusetts passed a law requiring religious officials to report the abuse of children.

In response to these allegations, defenders of the Church's actions have suggested that in reassigning priests after treatment, bishops were acting on the best medical advice then available, a policy also followed by the US public school system when dealing with accused teachers. Some bishops and psychiatrists have asserted that the prevailing psychology of the times suggested that people could be cured of such behavior through counseling. Many of the abusive priests had received counseling before being reassigned. Critics have questioned whether bishops are necessarily able to form accurate judgments on a priest's recovery. The priests were allowed to resume their previous duties with children only when the bishop was advised by the treating psychologists or psychiatrists that it was safe for them to resume their duties.

According to the John Jay study, "3 percent of all priests against whom allegations were made were convicted and about 2 percent received prison sentences."

== Media coverage and public opinion ==
=== Media coverage ===
==== The Boston Globe ====
In 2002, The Boston Globe publicized their research of sex abusers within the Catholic church, being primarily priests within the Boston Archdioceses. Through the research and interviews conducted, The Boston Globe uncovered upwards of 130 victims of sexual abuse by a single priest. This information caused a public uproar as many accused priests were still practicing. The results of The Boston Globes' research indicate that "more than 800 individuals accused 248 Boston Archdioceses priests of abusing them as children".

The Boston Globe spoke with several victims about their perpetrators and gathered significant details which were then published. Following the first publications, The Boston Globe continued to publish new articles on a daily basis and exposed hundreds of cases where priests were involved in sexual abuse scandals.

The Boston Globe found that accused priests were put on a temporary "sick leave" and were then transferred to another parish where the priest could have a fresh start. This was done without the knowledge of the parish. The victims often were offered a financial settlement in order to keep their experiences out of the public eye.

==== Public opinion ====
Differing perspectives and misconceptions contributed to negative public opinion in the U.S. towards what was perceived as the failure of the Catholic hierarchy to respond adequately to allegations of sexual abuse and the seemingly sluggish response of the Vatican to the unfolding scandal. Some sources argue that the negative public opinion was fueled in part by statements made to the media by various parties with differing agendas including lawyers for those suing the Church for damages resulting from the alleged sexual abuse. As public furor over the scandal grew, some members of the Catholic Church began to see an anti-Catholic agenda behind some of these pronouncements.

Criticism of media coverage by Catholics and others centered on an excessive focus being placed on Catholic incidents of abuse. Such voices argue that equal or greater levels of child sexual abuse in other religious groups or in secular contexts such as the US public school system have been either ignored or given minimal coverage by mainstream media. Anglican writer Philip Jenkins supported many of these arguments stating that media coverage of the abuse story had become "a gross efflorescence of anti-Catholic rhetoric".

== Response of the Vatican ==
=== Pope John Paul II ===
In 1993, Pope John Paul II addressed the sexual abuse issues via a letter. This letter was sent to American Bishops. This is said to be the first time the Vatican addressed the sexual abuse cases that were occurring. Pope John Paul II stated, "Woe to the world because of scandals!" The letter continues with a somber tone of sorrow for those who are victims.

In 2003, Pope John Paul II stated that "there is no place in the priesthood and religious life for those who would harm the young".

=== Pope Benedict XVI ===
Pope Benedict XVI apologized for the sexual abuse of minors by Catholic clergy and pledged that abusers would not be allowed to become priests in the Catholic Church. A document obtained by The Associated Press shows Pope Benedict XVI laicized nearly 400 priests over just two years for sexually molesting children.

=== Pope Francis ===
The Pontifical Commission for the Protection of Minors (Italian: Pontificia Commissione per la Tutela dei Minori) was instituted by Pope Francis on 22 March 2014 for the safeguarding of minors. It is headed by Boston's Cardinal Archbishop, Sean P. O'Malley, O.F.M. Cap.

==== 2020 Vatican report on McCarrick ====
In October 2018, the Holy See announced that it would conduct an investigation into how allegations against Theodore McCarrick, a former cardinal and Catholic Archbishop of Washington, D.C. from 2001 to 2006 were handled. McCarrick was laicized in February 2019, following credible allegations of repeated sexual misconduct towards children and seminarians. The Report was published on Tuesday, Nov. 10, at 2p.m. local time in Rome, under the title "Report on the Holy See's institutional knowledge and decision-making process related to former Cardinal Theodore Edgar McCarrick (from 1930 to 2017)". Summarizing the key findings of the Report, Andrea Tornielli said:

At the time of Theodore McCarrick’s appointment as Archbishop of Washington in 2000, the Holy See acted on the basis of partial and incomplete information. What has now come to light are omissions, underestimations, and choices that later proved to be wrong, due in part to the fact that, during the assessment process requested by Rome at the time, those questioned did not always disclose all they knew. Until 2017, there had never been any precise accusation regarding sexual abuse or harassment or harm done to a minor. As soon as the first report was received from a victim who was a minor at the time the abuse was committed, Pope Francis reacted promptly regarding the elderly cardinal, who had already retired as head of the archdiocese in 2006, first taking away his red hat and then dismissing him from the clerical state. This is what emerges from the Report on the Holy See’s Institutional Knowledge and Decision-Making Related to Former Cardinal Theodore Edgar McCarrick (1930 to 2017) published by the Secretariat of State.

Pope John Paul II and Pope Benedict XVI were both blamed in the Vatican report for allowing McCarrick to rise in power although they both knew of sex abuse allegations against him.

== Impact on the church ==
=== Compensation payouts ===
According to Donald Cozzens, "by the end of the mid 1990s, it was estimated that ... more than half a billion dollars had been paid in jury awards, settlements and legal fees." This figure grew to about one billion dollars by 2002. Roman Catholics spent $615 million on sex abuse cases in 2007.

In 2002, one attorney reported total earnings of $60 million from suing the church.

For some of the payments, loans of up to $500 million were extended to four American dioceses in 2005–07 by Allied Irish Banks (AIB), based in the Republic of Ireland. Peter Sutherland had been chairman of AIB in 1989–93, and was the Consulter of the Extraordinary Section of the Administration of the Patrimony of the Holy See from December 2006. AIB had to be nationalized during the Irish financial crisis.

Date	Diocese	Bishop	Payment	Number of recipients	Comments
1997	Diocese of Dallas	Charles Victor Grahmann	$31 million		
June 2003	Archdiocese of Louisville	Thomas Cajetan Kelly	$25.7 million	240	
September 2003	Archdiocese of Boston	Seán Patrick O'Malley	$85 million	552	Victims received an average of $92,000 each
2004	Diocese of Davenport	William Edwin Franklin	$9 million	37	
September 2004	Diocese of Tucson	Gerald Frederick Kicanas	$22.2 million		Filed for bankruptcy
December 2004	Diocese of Spokane, Washington	William S. Skylstad	$48 million		Payment agreement was part of bankruptcy proceeding
2005	Diocese of Sacramento	William Keith Weigand	$35 million	33	
January 2005	Diocese of Orange	Tod Brown	$100 million	87	In addition, 91 victims received an average of $659,000 each
October 2006	Diocese of Davenport	Martin John Amos	$37 million	156	Filed for bankruptcy
December 2006	Diocese of Phoenix	Thomas Olmsted	$100,000	1	
December 2006	Archdiocese of Los Angeles	Roger Mahony	$60 million	45	
January 2007	Diocese of Charleston	Robert J. Baker	$12 million		
October 2007	Diocese of Orange	Tod David Brown	$7 million	1	
July 2007	Archdiocese of Los Angeles	Roger Mahony	$660 million	508	Average of $1.3m for each plaintiff
September 2007	Diocese of San Diego	Robert Brom	$198.1 million	144	
March 2008	Diocese of Fairbanks	Donald Kettler	$50 million	140	Filed for bankruptcy
May 2008	Diocese of Sacramento	Jaime Soto	$100,000	1	The Jesuit Order, not the diocese, paid a $16 million settlement for molestation of nine children by two of their priests
July 2008	Archdiocese of Denver	Charles Chaput	$5.5 million	18	Resolved through mediation
October 2009	Diocese of Wilmington	W. Francis Malooly		131	Filed for bankruptcy
2014	Archdiocese of Los Angeles	José Horacio Gómez	$13 million	17	
January 2020	Archdiocese of Los Angeles	José Horacio Gómez	$1.9 million		
October 2024	Archdiocese of Los Angeles	José Horacio Gómez	$880 million	1,350	

=== Bankruptcies ===
Many US dioceses have filed for bankruptcy or Chapter 11 bankruptcy protection due to the cost of compensation to abuse victims. This has been criticized as a way to put further cases on indefinite hold. Chapter 11 protection avoids numerous costly individual trials, grouping them into one settlement. There is no discovery process about such matters as what church leaders knew as in a trial. Abuse survivors have called this a way to silence them. Joseph Piscitelli, a 1970s victim in the diocese of Oakland, California whose 2020 case was put on hold when the diocese declared bankruptcy in 2023, said "Oakland could get together enough money to build a $200m cathedral not too long ago, but they can't get the money together to pay the child victims whom they raped for decades".

- Citing monetary concerns arising from impending trials on sex abuse claims, the Archdiocese of Portland (Oregon) filed for Chapter 11 bankruptcy on July 6, 2004, hours before two abuse trials were set to begin, becoming the first Roman Catholic diocese to file for bankruptcy. If granted, bankruptcy would mean pending and future lawsuits would be settled in federal bankruptcy court. The archdiocese had settled more than one hundred previous claims for a sum of over $53 million. The filing seeks to protect parish assets, school money and trust funds from abuse victims; the archdiocese's contention is that parish assets are not the archdiocese's assets. Plaintiffs in the cases against the archdiocese have argued that the Catholic Church is a single entity, and that the Vatican should be liable for any damages awarded in judgment of pending sexual abuse cases.
- In December 2004, the Diocese of Spokane, Washington agreed to pay at least $48 million as compensation to those abused by priests as part of its bankruptcy filing. This payout has to be agreed upon by victims and another judge.
- The Diocese of Tucson filed for bankruptcy in September 2004. The diocese reached an agreement with its victims, which the bankruptcy judge approved June 11, 2005, specifying terms that included allowing the diocese reorganization to continue in return for a $22.2 million settlement.
- On October 10, 2006, the Diocese of Davenport filed for Chapter 11 protection. The decision to file for bankruptcy was driven by many claims which focused on Bishop Lawrence Soens, who had been accused of fondling as many as 15 students during his tenure as priest and principal at Regina Catholic High School in Iowa City during the 1960s. Soens denies the allegations. A judge discharged one suit in October 2006.
- On February 27, 2007, the Diocese of San Diego filed for Chapter 11 protection, hours before the first of about 150 lawsuits was due to be heard. San Diego became the largest diocese to postpone its legal problems in this way. The bankruptcy was dismissed November 16, 2007, on a motion by the Diocese after a settlement of $198 million was reached with 144 claimants.
- On March 7, 2008, the Diocese of Fairbanks filed for bankruptcy after the failure of negotiations to settle 130 civil suits filed by Alaska natives who claimed to be abused by priests, and other church employees, beginning in the 1950s.
- On October 18, 2008, the Diocese of Wilmington filed for bankruptcy as the first of some eight lawsuits (of more than 100 potential) was scheduled to go to trial the next day.
- On January 4, 2011, the Archdiocese of Milwaukee announced that it would be filing for bankruptcy. The church was facing more than 23 lawsuits, and attempts to reach a mediated settlement with victims failed in December 2010. This came two days before the Bishop was scheduled to be deposed about these cases, and after the church had refused to release the names or personnel records of the accused priests. The opposing attorney said that the bankruptcy filing was an attempt to delay turning over church records on the cases. The Milwaukee archdiocese has already paid out over $29 million to settle 200 cases over the last 20 years. They said that these additional cases would cause hefty legal fees that the dioceses could not afford. The diocese has assets of about $98.4 million, but $90 million of that is restricted for specific uses. Prior to the bankruptcy Cardinal Timothy Dolan then an Archbishop, with Vatican approval transferred $57 million from diocesan funds to prevent victims awarded compensation accessing the money.
- On January 17, 2015, the Archdiocese of Saint Paul and Minneapolis filed for Chapter 11 bankruptcy reorganization.
- On December 7, 2015, the Roman Catholic Diocese of Duluth filed for Chapter 11 bankruptcy reorganization. The bankruptcy follows a $8.1 million verdict against the diocese.
- On February 19, 2020, the Roman Catholic Diocese of Harrisburg filed for Chapter 11 bankruptcy protection after disclosing to federal bankruptcy court it has more than 200 creditors and estimated liabilities between $50 million and $100 million, with assets of less than $10 million. The Harrisburg Diocese was the first Catholic diocese in Pennsylvania to seek bankruptcy protection.
- On May 1, 2020, the Roman Catholic Archdiocese of New Orleans filed for Chapter 11 bankruptcy.
- On March 15, 2023, the Roman Catholic Diocese of Albany, NY filed for Chapter 11 bankruptcy protection.

=== Seal of the confessional ===
One issue that is often raised by legislators and law enforcement is the confidentiality which is enjoyed between priest and penitent in the Sacrament of Penance. In the Catholic Church, the penitent's confession of sins is absolutely secret and can be revealed to no one. Western democracies, and in particular, the US government, have historically recognized and upheld this confidentiality, but as of 2021, some challenges have been brought against this secrecy. In North Dakota, a bill was introduced which will compel Catholic priests to divulge the confessions they have heard to law enforcement, abolishing the priest-penitent privilege.

=== Resignations ===
In 2002, the Diocese of Manchester signed an agreement with the state's attorney general, acknowledging that past diocesan failures to protect minors from abusive priests were possible grounds for the diocese as an institution to be convicted under the state's child endangerment statute. On February 10, 2003, a special grand jury was conducted by the Suffolk County District Attorney's Office under the leadership of District Attorney Thomas Spota. "The grand jury concludes that the history of the Diocese of Rockville Centre demonstrates that as an institution they are incapable of properly handling issues relating to the sexual abuse of children by priests," the special grand jury said in a 180-page report based on a nine-month inquiry.

Bernard Francis Law, Cardinal and Archbishop of Boston, Massachusetts, United States resigned after Church documents were revealed which suggested he had covered up sexual abuse committed by priests in his archdiocese. For example, John Geoghan was shifted from one parish to another although Cardinal Law had often been informed of his abuse. In December 1984, auxiliary Bishop John M. D'Arcy wrote to Cardinal Law complaining about the reassignment of Geoghan to another Boston-area parish because of his "history of homosexual involvement with young boys."

== Continued attention to issue ==
While the Church in the United States claims to have addressed the issue, others maintain the only change is that the Church has hardened its defenses while allowing abuse to continue. The United States Conference of Catholic Bishops convened a meeting in Dallas on June 12, 2002, to address the sex abuse scandal. They announced a national policy of zero tolerance for those accused of molesting.

In 2005, Dr. Kathleen McChesney of the United States Conference of Catholic Bishops said that the crisis is not yet over because thousands of victims across the country are still reporting abuse. She said: "In 2004, at least 1,092 allegations of sexual abuse were made against at least 756 Catholic priests and deacons in the United States. Most of the alleged incidents occurred between 1965 and 1974. What is over is the denial that this problem exists, and what is over is the reluctance of the Church to deal openly with the public about the nature and extent of the problem."

In 2010, the Associated Press reported that the number of allegations, victims, and offending clergy dropped in 2009 to their lowest point since data started being collected in 2004. Dioceses and their insurers paid $104 million in settlement fees, attorney fees and other costs, down from $376 million in 2008.

In 2013, a group calling itself Catholic Whistleblowers began to launch a public campaign to encourage improvement in implementing the zero-tolerance policies on child sexual abuse by clergy members. The group said that despite annual audits of the policies by the bishops commission since 2004—which show improvements—"vigilance is necessary because some bishops are violating the ... policies, and abusive clergy (who now number 6,275, according to the bishops' count of those accusations that they deem credible) still have access to children", according to a media report. One focus of the group's activity has been a priest in the Archdiocese of Newark. "Several of the whistle-blowers ... [a]long with some New Jersey politicians ... have called for the resignation of the archbishop of Newark, John J. Myers" in the matter. The group has also "sent a letter to Pope Francis asking him to take several significant steps to heal victims and restore the church's credibility". The Whistleblowers have a steering committee of 12 priests, nuns and lay people. "Rev. Thomas P. Doyle—perhaps the church's most famed whistle-blower—recently joined the group"; and a news conference was scheduled for late May 2013; the report also said.

In July 2020, the U.S. Roman Catholic bishops said that 4,434 sex abuse allegations against clergy were filed in the 2018–19 audit year, triple the number seen the previous year, with much of the increase stemming from a wave of lawsuits and claims by survivors of decades-old molestation. They reported paying out $281.6 million during the year. 37 of the new allegations were made by people who were minors in the audit year ending June 30, 2019.

=== New York Child Victims Legislation ===
On December 7, 2018, a measure was signed into law which requires private schools throughout the state of New York to report allegations of sex abuse. On December 21, 2018, another measure was signed into law requiring the New York Department of Health to notify victims of their legal rights as they navigate the medical and criminal justice systems. This measure also extends a victim's right to consult with a rape crisis organization and receive updates on the status of their case as well. On January 28, 2019, members of the New York state Assembly and Senate passed a bill allowing prosecutors to bring criminal charges until a victim turned 28, and permitting victims to sue until age 55. The bill was sent to Cuomo's desk on February 7. Cuomo signed the bill into law on February 14, 2019. On May 8, 2020, Cuomo extended the statewide statute of limitations deadline to file sex abuse lawsuits, which was originally set for August 14, 2020, to January 14, 2021. On May 13, 2020, a challenge to law's constitutional legality which was filed by the Roman Catholic Diocese of Rockville Centre was tossed after a Nassau County Supreme Court justice ruled that the law does not violate due process.

=== Establishment of third-party reporting system against bishops ===
On June 13, 2019, during a meeting in Baltimore, the General Assembly of the U.S. Conference of Catholic Bishops approved a measure to authorize the design of a "third-party system" for receiving confidentially, by phone or online, reports of possible violations by bishop. The "third-party system", which was approved by a vote of 205 to 16 with 3 abstentions, complies with Pope Francis' Vos estis lux mundi. By a vote of 200 to 21 with 2 abstentions, the bishops also voted to authorize the executive committee to develop a more detailed proposal for a third-party reporting system, including financial, structural, and other necessary adjustments to account for Vos estis lux mundi, for review and approval by the Conference's Administrative Committee at its September and November 2019 meetings. Additionally, the bishops voted in favor of committing to activate the third-party reporting system by no later than May 31, 2020 by a 220 to 4 vote with 1 abstention.

=== Revelations of withheld names ===
On December 29, 2019, it was revealed that numerous bishops across the United States withheld the names of hundreds of Catholic clergy who were accused of committing acts of sex abuse while serving in their Dioceses.

=== Report on Baltimore Archdiocese Released ===
On April 5, 2023, a report issued by the Maryland Attorney General's Office stated that more than 150 Catholic priests and others associated with the Archdiocese of Baltimore sexually abused more than 600 children over the past 80 years. The investigation also revealed that the archdiocese failed to report many allegations of sexual abuse to authorities, conduct adequate investigations, remove abusers from the ministry or restrict their access to children.

== See also ==
Sexual abuse cases in catholic church

- Catholic Church sex abuse cases
- Catholic Church sex abuse cases by country

Critique and consequences related topics

- Criticism of Pope John Paul II
- Debate on the causes of clerical child abuse
- Ecclesiastical response to Catholic sex abuse cases
- Survivors Network of those Abused by Priests, NGO for victims in USA
- Richard Sipe and his research on clerical sexual abuse in the Catholic Church and clerical celibacy

Investigation, prevention and victim support related topics

- Charter for the Protection of Children and Young People, USA
- National Review Board, USA
- Sexual Addiction & Compulsivity, peer-reviewed journal on prevention & treatment
- Survivors Network of those Abused by Priests, USA
- Virtus (program), church initiative in USA
- Vos estis lux mundi, church procedure for abuse cases

Other related topics

- Child sexual abuse
- Pontifical secret
- Religious abuse
