= Sexual abuse scandal in the Roman Catholic Archdiocese of Hartford =

The sexual abuse scandal in Hartford archdiocese is an episode in the series of Catholic sex abuse cases in the United States. It took place in the Roman Catholic Archdiocese of Hartford in the US state of Connecticut. As of 2019, there were a known 146 sexual abuse claims against 32 priests.

== Abuse Allegations ==
In February 2005, former Archdiocese of Hartford priest Roman Kramek was deported back to his native country of Poland after serving nine months in prison for sexually assaulting a teenage girl who had sought his spiritual counseling in 2002. In October 2009, dozens of patients and their lawyers filed suit against the diocese of Hartford over claims that they were molested by Dr. George Reardon (not a priest) at St. Francis Hospital over an extended period of several decades. Victims's groups claim that the diocese shares legal responsibility in the cases of abuse. Attorneys for the plaintiffs reached a settlement with the hospital.

In 2005, the Archdiocese of Hartford paid $22 million to settle sexual abuse claims brought by 43 people against 14 priests, the majority of cases occurring in the 1960s and 1970s. Mansell considered the settlement "part of a healing process for the persons whose lives have been severely harmed by the evil of sexual abuse and for the Church itself." In February 2012, the jury awarded $1 million to a former altar boy, identified as Jacob Doe, who testified that he and a friend were repeatedly sexually assaulted and molested by Rev. Ivan Ferguson.

In August 2013, Fr. Michael Joseph Miller, who previously served at St Paul Parish in Kensington, pleaded guilty to possession of child pornography, publishing an obscenity, and three counts of risk of injury to a minor. He was then and sentenced to 5-20 years in prison.

As of January 2019, the Archdiocese of Hartford has paid $50.6 million to settle 146 priest sexual abuse claims against 32 priests. The settlements also date back several decades.

The diocese also released a list of thirty-six priests from the Hartford diocese that have been credibly accused of abuse; twenty-three are now deceased and none are currently still priests. Twelve more names were added to the list on January 22, 2019, bringing the total to 48. The list of the clergy who have been the objects of legal settlements or who were credibly accused of sexual abuse of a minor goes back to 1953; most of the claims date from before 1990.

Bishop Henry J. Mansell allegedly encouraged Edward Pipala, a New York priest who had been treated for pedophilia and barred from working with children, to seek a promotion in 1986. Pipala was later removed from duty and imprisoned for child molestation.

== Similar abuse in suffragan dioceses ==
There have been similar cases of abuse in the suffragan dioceses of the Hartford province, notably in Bridgeport and Providence, where bishops failed to deal with repeated allegations concerning pedophile priests.

== New policies against abuse ==
In response to the abuse scandal, the archdiocese of Hartford has adopted a set of policies designed to prevent future cases of abuse and to train diocesan laypeople and clergy to better respond to allegations of child molestation.

== Hopkins School ==
On March 24, 2020, it was announced that the prominent Hopkins School in New Haven and the Archdiocese of Hartford agreed to settle a sex abuse lawsuit involving a teacher who was regularly allowed to teach at the school and who was accused of sexually abusing boys while teaching at the school between at least 1990 and 1991. Both the Archdiocese of Hartford and Hopkins were accused of covering up the sex abuse and shielding the teacher from potential prosecution. The combined settlement totaled $7.48 million. The accused teacher, Glenn Goncalo, committed suicide in 1991 as arrangements were being made for him to turn himself over to the police.

== See also ==
- Charter for the Protection of Children and Young People
- Essential Norms
- National Review Board
- Pontifical Commission for the Protection of Minors
