= Sexual abuse scandal in the Roman Catholic Diocese of Davenport =

The sexual abuse scandal in Davenport diocese is one of a number of Catholic sex abuse cases in the United States and Ireland.

== Allegations against Bishop Soens ==
The decision was driven by many claims which focused on Bishop Lawrence Soens, who was accused of fondling as many as 15 students during his tenure as priest and principal at Regina Catholic High School in Iowa City during the 1960s. Soens denies the allegations.

== Diocesan investigation ==
In February 2006, the Diocese of Davenport investigative panel found behavior that may have been inappropriate, but it did not appear to be sexual in nature.

== Legal settlements ==
One claim was settled for $20K in 2004. Two more suits were pending in May 2006. Seven more suits were filed in May 2006. One new suit with 13 plaintiffs was filed in August 2006 alleging abuse from 1959 to 1967. A judge discharged one suit in October 2006. Recently, Bishop Soens was the first United States Roman Catholic Bishop to be named as being the object of 'credible' sexual abuse charges.

== Filing for bankruptcy ==
On October 10, 2006, the Diocese of Davenport filed for Chapter 11 protection. By November 27, 2007, $37 million had been allocated to 156 persons.

== Recovery under Bishop Amos ==
Since taking office, Bishop Martin John Amos has had to deal with the fallout from the sexual abuse scandal that had engulfed the Church. Two days before he assumed office, the Diocese of Davenport filed for Chapter Eleven bankruptcy protection.

== See also ==
- Abuse
- Charter for the Protection of Children and Young People
- Child abuse
- Child sexual abuse
- Essential Norms
- National Review Board
- Pontifical Commission for the Protection of Minors
- Religious abuse
- Sexual abuse
- Sexual misconduct
- Spiritual abuse
