= Sexual abuse scandal in the Roman Catholic Archdiocese of Portland in Oregon =

The sexual abuse cases in the Roman Catholic Archdiocese of Portland in Oregon in the United States is an important chapter in the series of Catholic sex abuse cases in the United States. During its course in July 2004, the archdiocese under Archbishop John George Vlazny filed for bankruptcy.

== Thomas Laughlin ==
In 1983, local priest Thomas Laughlin was sentenced to a year in prison for charges of sex abuse. Laughlin, who was accused of molesting several boys between 1972 and 1983, served his one-year sentence in Multnomah County prison. A lawsuit also resulted in him being removed from ministry and ordered to undergo therapy. However, he was not officially defrocked until 1988. By 2007, it was estimated that the Diocese had paid $20.7 million to 34 victims of Laughlin.

== Bankruptcy and settlements ==
In October 2000, the archdiocese was presented with another lawsuit, this time amounting to $44 million, by men who stated they had been molested by archdiocese priest Maurice Grammond between 1950 and 1974.

The archdiocese of Portland filed for Chapter 11 reorganization on July 6, 2004. Portland became the first Catholic diocese to file for bankruptcy.

The archdiocese had settled more than one hundred previous claims for a sum of over $53 million prior to the filing seeks to protect parish assets, school money and trust funds from plaintiffs: the archdiocese's contention is that parish assets are not the archdiocese's assets. Plaintiffs in the cases against the archdiocese have argued that the Catholic Church is a single entity, and that the Vatican should be liable for any damages awarded in judgment of pending sexual abuse cases.

After the filing, an April 29, 2005 deadline was set by the bankruptcy court to allow other people to file complaints. According to an October 2005 archbishop's column in the Catholic Sentinel, nearly 200 more claims of all kinds were filed as a result. That column also noted that the archdiocese has filed suit against insurance companies to compel them to contribute financially to the settlement expected to arise out of the reorganization.

A press release issued by the Archdiocese of Portland on April 17, 2007, announced a settlement plan had been reached and a bankruptcy court had approved a financial plan of reorganization. In 2018, Portland Archbishop Alexander King Sample acknowledged the history of sex abuse in the Archdiocese of Portland, which he described as an "institutional and spiritual" failure, and issued an apology. At the same time, it was reported that more than 100 sex abuse lawsuits were settled prior to the 2004 bankruptcy.

== Society of Jesus bankruptcy ==
In 2009, the Oregon Province of the Society of Jesus filed for bankruptcy as well. As part of the bankruptcy agreement, the Oregon Province, which later merged with the California Province in 2017 to form the USA West Province, had to publicly disclose its list of Jesuit clergy with credible accusations of sex abuse. This list was published in 2009, and was added to the West Province list which was made public in December 2018. In 2011, the Oregon Jesuit Province agreed to pay $166.1 million in damages to nearly 500 sex abuse victims.

== Criticisms of Levada ==
Some have criticized how William Levada is alleged to have dealt with priests who had committed sexual abuse in Portland and in San Francisco. Levada, who became Archbishop of Portland in 1986, earned criticism for protecting Orso-Manzonetta, who died in 1996 without ever facing trial, as well.

== Relationship with the Fairbanks diocesan scandal ==
The lawsuits in the Fairbanks diocese have also affected the Jesuit chapter in the diocese of Portland, given that the Western Province of the American Jesuits is located in the State of Oregon.

== 2019 Settlement ==
In August 2019, the Archdiocese of Portland agreed to pay nearly $4 million to eight men who claimed they were sexually abused by Rev. Pius Brazaukus in the 1970s and the 1980s.

== See also ==
- Abuse
- Charter for the Protection of Children and Young People
- Child abuse
- Child sexual abuse
- Essential Norms
- National Review Board
- Pontifical Commission for the Protection of Minors
- Religious abuse
- Roman Catholic Church in the United States
- Sexual abuse
- Sexual misconduct
- Spiritual abuse
