= Sexual abuse scandal in the Roman Catholic Diocese of San Diego =

The sexual abuse scandal in the Roman Catholic Diocese of San Diego was a significant episode in the series of Catholic sex abuse cases in the United States during the late 20th and early 21st centuries. The Diocese of San Diego includes the City of San Diego and several counties in Southern California.

Of all the clerics accused of sexual abuse in the diocese, only two were ever convicted of those crimes. One was sentenced to probation for the possession of child pornography and the other to ten years in prison for molesting a youth. The latter priest said that he had molested over 100 boys during his tenure in the priesthood. Other priests were accused of crimes against children dating from the 1950s to the 1990s. The victims of these crimes, boys and girls, were choir members, altar servers and family friends of clerics. They were subjected to unwanted kissing, groping, masturbation, oral sex, sodomy and statutory rape.

During the early years, the diocese responded to accusations of sexual abuse by priests by either ignoring them or removing the offenders from their parishes, sending them away for treatment and then assigning them to new parishes. By the 1990's, the diocese was removing accused priests from ministry permanently and notifying parishes and law enforcement of possible crimes. The diocese faced an increasing wave of civil lawsuits by sexual abuse victims starting in the 1990s. Faced with a huge number of cases, the diocese declared bankruptcy in 2007 and announced a $198.1 million settlement of 144 cases.

Starting in 1993, the State of California passed several laws that made it easier for sexual abuse victims to sue dioceses for sexual abuse that happened decades in the past.

== Actions by State of California ==
The State of California had eased its statute of limitations requirements in 1993 for sexual abuse cases that were previously too old for prosecution. However, the US Supreme Court overturned that law in 2004. As a result, prosecutors were forced to file for dismissal of numerous cases of sexual abuse by clerics throughout the state.

In May 2019, California Attorney General Xavier Becerra opened an investigation into how the Catholic dioceses in California handled sexual abuse allegations. He directed the dioceses to preserve all of their sexual abuse records. California in January 2023 expanded its statute of limitations for sexual abuse crimes, increasing the opportunities for victims to sue for crimes happening when they were children. In January 2020, a new state law opened a second lookback window to allow the filing of sexual abuse lawsuits that would have normally been barred by the statute of limitations.

== Actions by Diocese of San Diego ==
The diocese in February 2007 filed for Chapter 11 Bankruptcy protection, hours before the first of 150 lawsuits was due to be heard in court. San Diego became the largest American diocese at that time to file for bankruptcy. The diocese in March 2007 released a list of 38 clerics with credible accusations of sexual abuse. In September 2007, the diocese agreed to pay $198.1 million to settle 144 claims of sexual abuse by clergy, the second-largest payment by a diocese. This settlement concluded four years of negotiations in state and federal courts.

The diocese in October 2010 released 10,000 documents from the personnel files of priests with credible sexual abuse allegations, priests being sued and priests who were convicted.

== Notable cases ==
=== Monsignor Rudolph Galindo ===
In the early 1960s, Galindo was assigned as a pastor at Our Lady of Guadalupe Parish in Otay Mesa. Jose Castro, then a young boy attending the church, told his mother one day that Galindo was molesting him. His mother took him to see Galindo, who denied the abuse. The priest then continued to sexually abuse Castro.

In early 2002, three men reported to the diocese that Galindo had abused them as children. They had all been altar boys at Our Lady. When Bishop Robert Brom confronted Galindo, now retired, about the allegations, he admitted to them. In November 2002, the diocese paid a financial settlement to one of the three victims. In 2020, one or more new victims filed lawsuits against the diocese regarding abuse by Galindo.

=== Reverend Robert S. Koerner ===
Koerner, a member of the Oblates religious order, served as pastor of St. Patrick's Parish in Calipatria from 1963 to 1990. In March 2003, Brom notified the parishioners of St. Patrick's that Koerner had molested several children during his tenure there. Before his death in 1999, Koerner had admitted to kissing some of the boys and girls at St. Patrick's, but told diocesan officials that he did not see the harm.

=== Monsignor William Armstrong Kraft ===
During the 1960s, the diocese assigned Kraft to St. Therese Parish in Del Cerro. However, Bishop Francis Furey started receiving complaints from parents about his inappropriate conduct with their sons. The diocese transferred Kraft in 1969 to run Holy Cross Cemetery in San Diego in 1969 and in 1971 to serve as pastor of Good Shepherd Parish in Mira Mesa. After seven years at Good Shepherd, he was sent to St. Charles Borromeo Parish in Point Loma. However, Bishop Leo Maher quickly moved Kraft to an administrative job after parishioners at St. Charles complained about his financial management.

In 1988, a man reported to the diocese that Kraft had sexually molested him at Good Shepherd when he was nine-years-old. However, since the complainant had a criminal record, Maher did not believe him. After speaking with Kraft in 1991, Brom decided not to assign him to any more parishes. In 1997, a man told the diocese that Kraft had abused him at St. Therese in the 1960s. A second man from St. Therese accused Kraft in 2001.

As Kraft was on his deathbed at Mercy Hospital and Medical Center in San Diego in August 2001, Brom and the most recent accuser visited him. Kraft said he could not remember the man, but said he was sorry if he hurt him. The diocese in December 2021 made a financial settlement of $250,000 with this victim.

In June 2003, the diocese was sued by two more victims of Kraft. The first victim was a woman who was sexually abused by him as a teenager while lying gravely ill from rheumatic fever in a hospital bed. The second victim was a man who said that Kraft abused him hundreds of times during the early 1970s at St. Therese.

=== Monsignor Patrick J. O'Keeffe ===
O'Keefe, an Irish priest, was assigned as a pastor in 1972 at St. Adelaide Parish in Highland. At that time, St. Adelaide was part of the Diocese of San Diego. That year he persuaded Nicki Rister, a member of the church choir, to have a sexual relationship with him. O'Keefe told Rister that he was in love with her and would leave the priesthood to get married. However, he never did. Rister in 1989 reported the sexual assaults to Bishop Phillip Straling of the Diocese of San Bernardino, which now had jurisdiction over St. Adelaide. However, Straling did not take any actions against O'Keefe until 1994, firing him for having sexual contact with three adult women.

In August 2002, O'Keefe was charged with 15 felony counts of oral copulation in the sexual assault on Rister. After being indicted, O'Keefe fled to Ireland.However, in July 2003, all charges against O'Keefe were dismissed due to the overturn in court of the California statute of limitations law.

Rister sued the Dioceses of San Diego and San Bernardino in 2003, saying that O'Keefe admitted to molesting her in a letter. Other lawsuits were filed by three girls accusing him of abusing them in Chula Vista during the 1950s. A fourth case was that of a woman who said O'Keefe molested her when she was age 14 at St. Margaret Mary School in Chino in 1990.However, all of these lawsuits were put on hold when the diocese announced plans to file for bankruptcy in February 2007.The Diocese of San Bernardino settled with Rister in September 2007.

=== Reverend Emmanuel Omemaga ===
In 1993, Omemaga was a visiting priest from the Philippines who was serving as an assistant pastor at Most Precious Blood Parish in Chula Vista. In August of that year, he was part of a parish group that travelled to Denver, Colorado, to see Pope John Paul II at World Youth Day 1993. During that trip, he allegedly molested a 14-year-old girl in his party. The girl's mother notified police in October 1993 and Omemaga in November was indicted on 39 felony and 2 misdemeanor counts of oral copulation, forcible rape, rape with a foreign object, taking lewd pictures and statutory rape. Police found nude pictures of the girl in his residence. Diocesan officials urged Omemaga to surrender to the police, but he instead fled to the Philippines. He never returned to the United States.

=== Reverend Franz Robier ===
Robier, an Austrian priest, was assigned as a pastor at Holy Spirit Parish in San Diego in 1955. Prior to his assignment, he had undergone treatment for pedophilia. Forty-eight years later, five women would accuse him of molesting them when they were children at that parish. The girls, then between ages eight and 11, were members of the church choir. Also during the early 1950s, the Catholic Charities branch of the diocese assumed the care of four German girls, ages of 5 and 13, who had lost their parents in Europe during World War II. Robier systematically abused all four girls.

In 1959, Robier was serving as pastor at St. Anthony Parish in San Bernardino, then part of the Diocese of San Diego. For several months, he molested a young girl known later as Jane Doe. Her mother complained then about the abuse to the diocese, but officials took no actions against Robier.

In February 2003, Jane Doe sued the Dioceses of San Diego and San Bernardino. The five women abused at Holy Spirit sued the Diocese of San Diego in September 2003. At the time of the 2007 $198.1 million settlement by the Diocese of San Diego, it was estimated that Robier had molested dozens of girls. The four German sisters sued the diocese in March 2007.

== Sexual abuse convictions ==
Of all the priests accused of sexual abuse of children in the Diocese of San Diego, only Reverends Holtey and Rodrigue were convicted in criminal court.

=== Reverend Gary Michael Holtey ===
In May 2004, the San Diego Police Department and the U.S. Bureau of Immigration and Customs Enforcement search the parish offices of St. Charles Borromeo in Loma Portal, looking for child pornography. They found hundreds of pornographic images of young boys on electronic devices there. Holtey, then pastor at St. Charles, took a leave of absence. In December 2004, he was charged with 20 misdemeanor counts of possessing child pornography. Holtey pleaded guilty in February 2005 to ten misdemeanor counts of possession of child pornography. After spending five months in a treatment program, he was sentenced in March 2005 to probation and a year-long treatment protocol. The diocese announced that he was permanently barred from ministry.

=== Reverend Edward Anthony Rodrigue ===
During the early 1970s, Rodrigue worked in several parishes in the diocese, being transferred frequently when accusations of sexual abuse arose. According to Rodrigue, in 1976 ten parents at a parish in El Centro complained about him. Bishop Leo Maher put him on the waiting list for admittance to the House of Affirmation, a treatment facility for priests in Whitinsville, Massachusetts. In the meantime, Maher assigned him to Our Lady of Soledad Parish in Coachella. Rodrigue was arrested in 1977 for performing oral sex on a teenage hitchhiker, but Maher persuaded police to let him handle it. In 1979, Rodrigue ended up at St. George Parish in Ontario, California. At that time, St. George was part of the Diocese of San Diego.

Rodrigue was charged in 1979 with molesting a boy at St. George and was sentenced to probation. He would attend the physical education classes at the parish school and wrestle with the boys. The diocese then sent him to a treatment center in Azusa for 11 months. After finishing treatment, the diocese assigned him temporarily to St. Joseph the Worker Parish in Loma Linda before he retired in 1983. The Vatican laicized Rodrigue in 1992.

In April 1997, Rodrigue was babysitting a 10-year-old child with developmental disabilities in Highland. When the mother returned, she noticed a hickey on her son's neck. He then told her that Rodrigue tried to kiss him and groped his genitals. Police arrested him and charged him with sexual abuse. He admitted to investigators that he had abuse four or five boys every year of his 22 years as a priest. Rodrigue pleaded guilty to two counts of lewd and lascivious acts with a minor and was sentenced to 10 years in prison.

In June 2003, two brothers sued the diocese, claiming that Rodrigue sexually abused them at St. George when one was age seven and the other was age 12.They also sued the Diocese of San Bernardino, which now had jurisdiction over St. George. By September 2003, the two dioceses were facing five sexual abuse lawsuits involving Rodrigue.

== See also ==
- Abuse
- Charter for the Protection of Children and Young People
- Child abuse
- Child sexual abuse
- Essential Norms
- National Review Board
- Pontifical Commission for the Protection of Minors
- Religious abuse
- Sexual abuse
- Sexual misconduct
- Spiritual abuse
