= Sexual abuse scandal in the Roman Catholic Diocese of Palm Beach =

The sexual abuse scandal in Palm Beach diocese is a significant episode in the series of Catholic sex abuse cases in the United States and Ireland.

Bishop Joseph Keith Symons resigned as ordinary in 1998 after admitting he molested five boys early in his career.

Symons' successor Anthony O'Connell resigned in 2002 after admitting to molesting an underage seminarian. O'Connell held a press conference to admit his wrongdoing and publicly apologized to the man.

In an effort to quell the scandal, Sean O'Malley was appointed bishop of Palm Beach on September 3, 2002. He was installed on the following October 19. He served the Diocese of Palm Beach for less than a year before being appointed to return to Massachusetts to succeed Cardinal Bernard Law in Boston and put out the firestorm of controversy caused by Law's conduct.

Bishop Gerald Barbarito has repeatedly pledged to remove from ministry any priests found to have abused a child and to help abuse victims in any way the Church can, but he has seen no need to publicly name accused priests.

On January 7, 2015, India native Rev. Jose Palimattom, who was serving as the pastor at Holy Name of Jesus Catholic Church in West Palm Beach, was arrested for possessing child pornography and for asking a kid to erase it from his phone. On September 17, 2020, a lawsuit was filed against both the Diocese of Palm Beach and administrators of its All Saint's School in Jupiter, alleging that both parties failed to protect an 11-year-old girl from repeated sexual abuse by another student in an unsupervised classroom on campus. The alleged abuse occurred between January and March 2020.

== See also ==
- Abuse
- Charter for the Protection of Children and Young People
- Child abuse
- Child sexual abuse
- Essential Norms
- National Review Board
- Pontifical Commission for the Protection of Minors
- Religious abuse
- Sexual abuse
- Sexual misconduct
- Spiritual abuse
