= Sexual abuse scandal in the Roman Catholic Diocese of Orange =

2004 scandal regarding sexual abuse of minors

The sexual abuse scandal in the Roman Catholic Diocese of Orange has been a significant chapter in the American Catholic sexual abuse scandal. The Diocese of Orange is located in Orange County, California.

The diocese in 2004 announced a $100 million financial settlement to 87 individuals who were sexually abused by 43 priests, religious brothers and lay workers. Two of the most prolific sexual abusers, Reverends Siegfried Widera and Eleuterio V. Ramos, abused numerous minors and were responsible for tens of millions of dollars in settlements paid by the diocese.

As of 2025, two priests in the diocese have been convicted of sexual abuse crimes and sentenced to prison. The State of California in 1993 passed a statute of limitations law that would have allowed more criminal prosecutions of sexual offenders. That law was overturned by the US Supreme Court in 2004. A new California law in 2019 allowed more sexual abuse civil suits to proceed.

== Actions by State of California ==
The State of California in 1993 eased its statute of limitations requirements for the prosecution of sexual abuse cases that were previously too old. The law was challenged in court in 1998 by a man who had been accused of sexual abuse. The case went to the US Supreme Court, which ruled against California in 2004.

California in early 2019 passed a law that opened a three-year window that allowed sexual abuse lawsuits that were not eligible due to the statute of limitations. The window was to close in 2022. In June 2019. California State Attorney General Xavier Becerra announced that his office would audit the procedures used by all the dioceses in California to report sexual abuse allegations to police. He required several diocese, including the Diocese of Orange, to turn over those files to the California Department of Justice.

== Actions by Diocese of Orange ==
The diocese in January 2004 identified 15 priests with credible accusations of sexual abuse of children. The report stated that 47 children had been their victims. On January 3, 2005, following two years of mediation, Bishop Tod Brown apologized to 87 victims of sexual abuse and announced a financial settlement of $100 million. The suits alleged sexual misconduct on the part of 30 priests, two nuns, one religious brother, and ten lay personnel into the 1980s:

- Eleven victim claims were file against Eleuterio Ramos
- Nine claims were against Siegfried Widera
- About 25 cases involved abuse prior to the erection of the diocese in 1978, one to 1936.

It was the first settlement in California arising from the Catholic Church sex abuse scandal of the late 20th and early 21st centuries, . About half of the sum was covered by liability insurance. During his time as director of priest personnel in the diocese during the 1970s and 1980s, Auxiliary Bishop Michael Driscoll was involved in transferring several abusive priests from one parish to another, where they continued to abuse children. In May 2005, Driscoll, then bishop of the Diocese of Boise, stated he was:

"...deeply sorry that the way we handled cases [in Orange County] allowed children to be victimized by permitting some priests to remain in ministry, for not disclosing their behavior to those who might be at risk, and for not monitoring their actions more closely."

The diocese in October 2006 settled four sexual abuse lawsuits for $7 million. Three of the plaintiffs were women who had been sexually abused by lay teachers at Mater Dei and Santa Margarita High Schools.

== Prominent civil suits ==
=== Monsignor Michael A. Harris ===
In December 1993, Lenora Colice, the mother of Vincent Collice, confronted Harris, the former principal at Mater Dei High School in Santa Ana. Before Vincent died of HIV/AIDS in November 1993, he told Leonora that Harris had sexually abused him at the school and his residence. Harris denied the accusations; in January 2004, Leonora took her accusations directly to the Diocese of Orange. The diocesan leadership asked Harris to take a leave of absence from his current position as principal of Santa Margarita High School in Rancho Santa Margarita. When the diocese announced in March that he was under investigation, Harris quit his job

David Price, another former student at Mater Dei, accused Harris in June 1994 of sexual assaulting him from 1979 through 1983. Price sued Harris and the diocese that year, but dropped the suit when a judge dropped the diocese from the lawsuit. The diocese in August 2001 settled a lawsuit for $5.2 million that was brought against it by Ryan DiMaria. He was also sexually abused by Harris as a teenager. The settlement also required the diocese to set up a hotline and website for sexual abuse claims and distribute educational pamphlets to all the diocesan schools and parishes. The Vatican laicized Harris in November 2001.

In 2003, nine men sued the diocese alleging that Harris sexually assaulted them at Mater Dei and Santa Margarita. The diocese in June 2012 made a $2 million financial settlement with a man who had been abused by Harris at Mater Dei. The diocese in December 2024 announced a $3.5-million settlement with another former student at Mater Dei.

=== Reverend Eleuterio V. Ramos ===
During the early 1970's, Ramos was a priest in the Archdiocese of Los Angeles. During this time, the archdiocese moved him to several parishes as it started receiving complaint about his behavior. By 1975, while serving at St. Joseph Parish in Placentia, .he was under psychiatric care. He was reassigned in 1978 to Immaculate Heart of Mary Parish in Santa Ana. Ramos plied his altar boys with wine coolers, beers and cigarettes, and showed them R-rated films in the church rectory. In return, the boys would allow Ramos to perform oral sex on them. Two teachers at the Immaculate Conception school complained about him to Bishop Johnson in late 1979, but received no response.

In December 1979, the parents of a 12-year-old boy complained to another priest that Ramo has given their son alcohol and sexually assaulted him. The diocese immediately sent Ramos to the Saint Luke Institute in Silver Spring, Maryland, for treatment. A month later, he returned to the diocese. He would be assigned to three more parishes, where he would again molest children. Bishop Driscoll was involved in these transfers, In 1985, Johnson persuaded Archbishop Emilio Carlos Berlie Belaunzarán of the Archdiocese of Tijuana in Mexico to take Ramos.

While in Tijuana, Ramos in 1990 wrote a letter of apology to one of his victims, whom he claimed was over age 18 at the time. A former altar boy sued the diocese in October 1994, saying that Ramos sexually abused him in Orange County during the 1970s. Ramos died in Los Angeles in 2004. He would ultimately admit to abusing 20 boys.

Robin Ward Agrusa in August 2018 filed a wrongful death suit against the diocese and the Archdiocese of Los Angeles. Her husband Mark Paul Agrusa, who committed suicide in March 2015, had been depressed over being sexually assaulted by Ramos at St. Joseph’s during the late 1970s. The diocese in January 2024 agreed to a $10 million settlement to a man who had been abused by both Widera and Ramos. When the plaintiff was five-years-old, Ramos sexually abused him at Immaculate Heart of Mary.

=== Reverend Siegfried Widera ===
In 1973. Widera, then a pastor at St. Mary Parish in Port Washington, Wisconsin, was convicted of sexual perversion for molesting an 11-year-old boys and was sentenced to probation. After he underwent therapy, the Archdiocese of Wisconsin assigned him to St. Andrew Parish in Delavan, Wisconsin. After more abuse allegations arose there, the archdiocese suggested that Widera take a vacation to visit his brother in Southern California.

Archbishop William Cousins of Milwaukee then contacted Bishop Driscoll, asking if the Diocese of Orange would accept Widera as a transfer. Cousins never mentioned Widera's conviction, but simply said that Widera had "...a moral problem having to do with a boy in school." Over the next nine years, Widera was assigned to six parishes in the diocese. After hearing several complaints about Widera molesting boys, the diocese in 1985 sent him to the Servants of the Paraclete treatment center in Jemez Springs, New Mexico. While in treatment, Widera admitted to molesting ten boys. After leaving the center, Widera opened his own business. In 2002, after being indicted on sexual abuse charges in Milwaukee and Orange Country, Widera fled to Mexico, where he committed suicide in 2003.

The Archdiocese of Milwaukee in 2007 paid a $17 million financial settlement to ten victims of Widera in Orange County. The Diocese of Orange, along with the Archdiocese of Los Angeles, agreed in December 2024 to a $10 million financial settlement for a man who had been sexually abused by Widera in Orange County during the 1980s when he was ten-years-old. He was previously abused by Ramos in 1980.

== Sexual abuse convictions ==
=== Gerardo Jarencio Tanilong ===
Tanilong, the pastor of Our Lady of Guadalupe-Delhi Parish in Santa Ana, was arrested in July 2003 after a 15-year-old girl accused him of sexually molesting her a few days earlier. He was riding with the girl in the backseat of her parents' car when he started groping her breast and tried to put his hand down her pants. Tanilong pleaded guilty to two felony counts of sexually abusing a minor. He was sentenced in April 2004 to six months in jail and three years of probation.

=== Reverend Luis Eduardo Ramirez ===
In January 2008, Ramirez was arrested by the Anaheim Police Department on suspicion of child annoyance or molestation and contributing to the delinquency of a minor. A member of the Order of Augustinian Recollects, he had been assigned as a pastor at Our Lady of the Pillar Parish in Santa Ana. Ramirez was accused that month of taking a 17-year-old boy to a hotel room, supposedly for counseling. After they consumed alcohol, he tried to touch the teenager, who then left the hotel. Ramirez pleaded guilty in June 2008 to misdemeanor battery and burglary. Ramirez was sentenced in August 2008 to 180 days in jail.

== See also ==
- Abuse
- Charter for the Protection of Children and Young People
- Child abuse
- Child sexual abuse
- Essential Norms
- National Review Board
- Pontifical Commission for the Protection of Minors
- Religious abuse
- Sexual abuse
- Sexual misconduct
- Spiritual abuse
