= Ecclesiastical response to Catholic sexual abuse cases =

The ecclesiastical response to Catholic sexual abuse cases is a major aspect of the academic literature surrounding the Catholic Church's child sexual abuse scandal. The Catholic Church's response to the scandal can be viewed on three levels: the diocesan level, the episcopal conference level and the Vatican. Responses to the scandal proceeded at all three levels in parallel with the higher levels becoming progressively more involved as the gravity of the problem became more apparent.

== Diocesan responses to the problem ==
For the most part, responding to allegations of sexual abuse in a diocese was left to the jurisdiction of the bishop or archbishop. Many of the accused priests were forced to resign or were laicized. In addition, several bishops who had participated in the cover-up were also forced to resign or retire.

It was revealed that some bishops had facilitated compensation payments to alleged victims on condition that the allegations remained secret. In addition, rather than being dismissed, the accused were often instructed to undergo psychological counseling and, on completion of counseling, reassigned to other parishes where, in some cases, they continued to abuse minors.

The dioceses in which abuse was committed or in which abuse allegations were settled out of court found it necessary to make financial settlements with the victims totaling over $1.5 billion as of March 2006. The number and size of these settlements made it necessary for the dioceses to reduce their ordinary operating expenses by closing churches and schools. In many instances, dioceses were forced to declare bankruptcy as a result of the settlements.

== Response of the US Conference of Catholic Bishops ==
Before The Boston Globe's coverage of the sexual abuse scandal in the Boston archdiocese, handling of sexual abuse allegations was largely left up to the discretion of individual bishops. After the number of allegations exploded following the Globe's series of articles, U.S. bishops felt compelled to formulate a coordinated response at the episcopal conference level.

As the breadth and depth of the scandals became apparent in dioceses across the United States, the USCCB declared that a joint response was warranted at the episcopal conference level. John F. Allen Jr. characterized the reaction of the USCCB as calling for "swift, sure and final punishment for priests who are guilty of this kind of misconduct." In contrast to this, Allen characterized the Vatican's primary concern as wanting to make sure "that everyone's rights are respected, including the rights of accused clergy" and wanting to affirm that it is not acceptable to "remedy the injustice of sexual abuse with the injustice of railroading priests who may or may not be guilty."

=== Charter for the Protection of Children and Young People ===
In June 2002, the United States Conference of Catholic Bishops (USCCB) unanimously approved a Charter for the Protection of Children and Young People that pledged the Catholic Church in the U.S. to providing a "safe environment" for all children in Church-sponsored activities. To accomplish this, the U.S. bishops made a commitment to develop uniform procedures for handling sex-abuse allegations against lay teachers in Catholic schools, parish staff members, coaches and other people who represent the Church to young people.

The thrust of the charter was the adoption of a "zero tolerance" policy for sexual abuse. The USCCB instituted reforms to prevent future abuse by requiring background checks for Church employees. They now require dioceses faced with an allegation to alert the authorities, conduct an investigation and remove the accused from duty.

The Charter also created a National Review Board, which was assigned responsibility to commission a descriptive study on the nature and scope of the abuse problem.

=== Essential norms ===
At the June 2002 conference, to ensure that each diocese/eparchy in the United States had procedures in place to respond promptly to allegations of sexual abuse of minors, the Bishops also decreed Essential Norms for Diocesan/Eparchial Policies Dealing with Allegations of Sexual Abuse of Minors by Priest or Deacons.

=== Prevention efforts ===
In 2002, the U.S. church claimed to adopt a "zero tolerance" policy for sexual abuse.

By 2008, the U.S. church had trained 5.8 million children to recognize and report abuse. It had run criminal checks on 1.53 million volunteers and employees, 162,700 educators, 51,000 clerics and 4,955 candidates for ordination. It had trained 1.8 million clergy, employees and volunteers in creating a safe environment for children.

== Response from the Holy See ==
=== Initial response ===
Although the Vatican did not respond immediately to the series of articles published by The Boston Globe in 2002, it has been reported that Vatican officials were, in fact, monitoring the situation in the U.S. closely. Over time, it became more apparent that the problem warranted greater Vatican involvement.

On April 30, 2001, John Paul II, issued a letter stating that "a sin against the Sixth Commandment of the Decalogue by a cleric with a minor under 18 years of age is to be considered a grave sin, or 'delictum gravius.'"

=== Crimen Sollicitationis controversy ===
In 2003 the existence of the "Crimen sollicitationis" secret document was revealed and some interpretations of the document concluded that it contains instructions to cover up abuse cases.

=== 2003 Vatican Conference on Sexual Abuse ===
In April 2003, the Pontifical Academy for Life organized a three-day conference, entitled "Abuse of Children and Young People by Catholic Priests and Religious", where eight non-Catholic psychiatric experts were invited to speak to near all Vatican dicasteries' representatives.

=== Papal apologies ===
In 2003, Pope John Paul II stated that "there is no place in the priesthood and religious life for those who would harm the young".

=== New rules regarding ordination ===
Because a significant majority of victims were teenage boys, the Vatican instituted reforms to prevent future United States abuse by requiring background checks for Church employees and issued new rules disallowing ordination of men with "deep–seated homosexual tendencies".

=== The Pontifical Commission for the Protection of Minors ===
The Pontifical Commission for the Protection of Minors (Italian: Pontificia Commissione per la Tutela dei Minori) was instituted by Pope Francis on 22 March 2014 for the safeguarding of minors.

=== The 2019 Meeting on the Protection of Minors in the Church ===
From 21 to 24 February 2019, a four-day Catholic Church summit meeting was held in Vatican City, called the Meeting on the Protection of Minors in the Church (Italian: Incontro su “La Protezione dei Minori nella Chiesa”) with the participation of the presidents of all the episcopal conferences of the world to discuss preventing sexual abuse by Catholic Church clergy.

=== 2019 Vatican norms ===
On March 26, 2019, one month after the summit was held, Pope Francis adopted:

- Vatican Law No. CCXCVII On the protection of minors and vulnerable persons;
- the Motu Proprio On the protection of minors and vulnerable persons;
- the Guidelines of the Vicariate of Vatican City on the protection of minors and vulnerable persons.

According to Andrea Tornielli, these:

are very specific laws, norms and indications destined, first of all, for those to whom they are addressed: in fact, they concern only Vatican City State, where a large number of priests and religious work, but where there are very few children. Although they have been conceived and written for a unique reality, in which the highest religious authority is also the sovereign and legislator, these three documents contain exemplary indications that take into account the most advanced international parameters."

Law No. CCXCVII requires Vatican City officials, including those in the Roman Curia, and diplomatic personnel of the Holy See, such as the Apostolic Nuncios, to report sex abuse. Failure to do so can result in a fine of up to 5,000 euros (about $5,600) or, in the case of a Vatican gendarme, up to six months in prison. In addition, all crimes related to child abuse, including mistreatment, are persecutable "ex officio", even when the purported victim does not file an official report. The law also extends the statute of limitations to 20-year prescription that, in the case of and offence against a minor, begin to count from on his or her eighteenth birthday. In addition, the Governorate of the Vatican City State is required to set up, within the Vatican Department of Health and Welfare, service to support and assist the victims of abuse, providing them with medical and psychological assistance and informing them of their rights and of how to enforce them.

The motu proprio extends the application of the Vatican law to the Roman Curia and its personnel. It requires that, when recruiting staff, the candidate's suitability to interact with minors must be ascertained.

The Guidelines for the Vicariate of Vatican City are addressed to the canons, parish priests and coadjutors of the two parishes located within the Vatican, as well as to the priests, deacons and educators of the Saint Pius X Pre-Seminary, to all the religious men and women who reside in the Vatican, and to all those who work within the ecclesiastical community of the Vicariate of Vatican City. The guidelines require that, in the course of pastoral activities, those persons must always be visible to others when they are in the presence of minors, and that it is strictly forbidden to establish a preferential relationship with a single minor, to address a minor in an offensive way or to engage in inappropriate or sexually allusive conduct, to ask a minor to keep a secret, to photograph or to film a minor without the written consent of his parents. The Vicar of Vatican City has also the obligation to report to the Promoter of Justice any news of abuse that is not manifestly unfounded, and to remove the alleged perpetrator of the abuse from pastoral activities as a precautionary measure.

=== The Motu Proprio Vos estis lux mundi ===
On May 9, 2019, Pope Francis issued the Motu Proprio Vos estis lux mundi requiring both clerics and religious brothers and sisters, including Bishops, throughout the world to report sex abuse cases and sex abuse cover-ups by their superiors. Under the new Motu Proprio, all Catholic dioceses throughout the world are required to establish stable mechanisms or systems through which people may submit reports of abuse or its cover-up by June 2020. All metropolitan Archdioceses are also required to send reports to the Holy See on the progress of the investigation, whether in their Archdiocese or suffragan dioceses, every 30 days and to complete the investigation within 90 days unless granted an extension. The law is effective for a 3-year experimental period with a vacatio legis of 1 June 2019. According to Canon law professor Kurt Martens:

This new law is without a doubt a rare gift to the entire church and sets, along with the companion Vatican law providing for jail time for any public official of the Vatican who fails to report abuse, an unmistakable new course. The painful, sometimes bitter, experience of the church in the United States and the voices of the faithful worldwide have helped bring about a change in attitude and a change in law. There is no turning back now, and the tone has been set for the future.

=== The Rescript "On the confidentiality of legal proceedings" ===
On December 17, 2019, Pope Francis issued canon law instruction "On the confidentiality of legal proceedings" lifting the "pontifical secret" in the cases relating to: violence or abuse of authority in forcing sexual acts, sexual abuse of minors or vulnerable persons, crimes of paedophilia involving children under 18 years of age or with incapacitated subjects and the concealment of those conducts from ecclesiastical or civil inquiries. Under this provisions, are excluded from the pontifical secret all the stages of the canonical trials, from the denunciation, to the phase of the preliminary investigations, to the phase of the proper debate, and up to the final decision, as well as any witness statements and documents produced in trial. It concerns both the procedures that take place at the local level, and those that take place in Rome, at the Congregation for the Doctrine of the Faith.

The instruction provides however that the information obtain in a canonical trial be treated in such a way as to ensure its security, integrity and confidentiality with a view to protecting the good name, image and privacy of all persons involved. Moreover, the Instruction does not in any way counter the absolute duty of the Priest to observe the sacramental seal nor the duty of observe the confidentiality of information acquired outside of confession within the whole forum called "extra-sacramental". At the same time, the professional secrecy of those involved in a canonical trial should not constitute an obstacle to “the fulfilment of the obligations laid down in all places by the laws of the State, including any reporting obligations [of possible news of a crime], and the execution of the enforcement requests of the civil courts” which, naturally, could oblige the delivery of documentary material to the civil courts. According to Archbishop Charles Scicluna, adjunct secretary of the Congregation for the Doctrine of the Faith, the abolition of pontifical secrecy means that:

The documents in a penal trial are not public domain, but they are available for authorities, or people who are interested parties, and authorities who have a statutory jurisdiction over the matter. So I think that when it comes, for example, to information that the Holy See has asked to share, one has to follow the international rules: that is, that there has to be a specific request, and that all the formalities of international law are to be followed. But otherwise, on the local level, although they are not public domain, communication with statutory authorities and the sharing of information and documentation are facilitated.

== Criticism of bishops for parish transfers ==
Some bishops have been heavily criticized for moving offending priests from parish to parish, where they still had personal contact with children, rather than seeking to have them permanently removed from the priesthood by laicization. The Church was widely criticized when it was discovered that some bishops knew about some of the alleged crimes committed, but reassigned the accused instead of seeking to have them permanently removed from the priesthood.

== Resignations, retirements and laicizations ==
Many of the accused priests were forced to resign or were laicized. In addition, several bishops who had participated in the cover up were also forced to resign or retire.

Bernard Francis Law, Cardinal and Archbishop of Boston, Massachusetts, United States resigned after Church documents were revealed which suggested he had covered up sexual abuse committed by priests in his archdiocese. December 13, 2002 Pope John Paul II accepted Law's resignation as Archbishop and reassigned him to an administrative position in the Roman Curia naming him archpriest of the Basilica di Santa Maria Maggiore. Law presided at one of the Pope's funeral masses. Law's successor, Bishop Séan P. O'Malley a Capuchin friar found it necessary to sell substantial real estate properties and close a number of churches in order to pay the $120 million in claims against the archdiocese.

Two bishops of Palm Beach, Florida, resigned due to child abuse allegations, resigned bishop Joseph Keith Symons was replaced by Anthony O'Connell, who later also resigned in 2002.

== See also ==
- Child sexual abuse
- Clerical celibacy
- Homosexual clergy in the Catholic Church
- Paraphilia
- Pontifical secret
- Religious abuse
- Spiritual abuse
