= John Jay Report =

2004 report by the John Jay College of Criminal Justice

The Nature and Scope of the Problem of Sexual Abuse of Minors by Catholic Priests and Deacons in the United States, commonly known as the John Jay Report, is a 2004 report by the John Jay College of Criminal Justice, commissioned by the U.S. Conference of Catholic Bishops, based on surveys completed by Catholic dioceses in the United States. The initial version of the report was posted on the Internet on February 27, 2004, with corrections and revisions posted on April 16. The printed version was published in June 2004.

== Background ==
In June 2002, as a result of the Catholic sexual abuse scandal in the United States, the United States Conference of Catholic Bishops met in Dallas and approved the Charter for the Protection of Children and Young People. The charter created a National Review Board, which was assigned responsibility to commission a descriptive study, with the full cooperation of the dioceses and eparchies, of the nature and scope of the problem of sexual abuse of minors by clergy. The National Review Board engaged the John Jay College of Criminal Justice of the City University of New York to conduct a study analyzing allegations of sexual abuse in Catholic dioceses in United States. The period covered by the John Jay study began in 1950 and ended in 2002. The product of the study was a report to the National Review Board titled The Nature and Scope of the Problem of Sexual Abuse of Minors by Catholic Priests and Deacons in the United States and commonly referred to as the John Jay Report.

== Summary ==
The report determined that, during the period from 1950 to 2002, a total of 10,667 individuals had made allegations of child sexual abuse. Of these, the dioceses had been able to identify 6,700 unique accusations against 4,392 clergy over that period in the US, which is about 4% of all 109,694 ordained clergy, i.e., priests or deacons or members of religious orders, active in the USA during the time covered by the study. However, of these 4392 accused, 252 (5.7% of those accused or less than 0.1% of total clergy) were convicted. The number of alleged abuses increased in the 1960s, peaked in the 1970s, declined in the 1980s, and by the 1990s had returned to the levels of the 1950s.

The surveys filtered information provided from diocesan files on each cleric accused of sexual abuse and on each of the clerics' victims to the research team so that they did not have access to the names of the accused clergy or the dioceses where they worked. The dioceses were encouraged to issue reports of their own based on the surveys that they had completed. Of the 4,392 clergy accused, 3,300 were not investigated because the cleric had already died. Of the remainder 1,021 were reported to police and of those, 384 were charged, resulting in 252 convictions and 100 prison sentences; In total, out of the 109,694 priests who were surveyed, 100 were imprisoned.

Thus, 6% of the 4,392 clergy against whom allegations were made (252 priests in total or <0.25% of all clerics) were convicted, and about 2% of the 4,392 accused priests (100 clerics or <0.1% of all clerics) received prison sentences. According to the report, one-third of the accusations were made in 2002 and 2003, and another third of the allegations were reported between 1993 and 2001. Over the same period there were about 1,000 new clergy ordained per year in the 1960s, declining to about 500 per year in 2014, and about 60,000 clergy at any one time. Thus one can say there were over 100,000 newly ordained and existing Roman Catholic clergy (109,694 John Jay p. 4) in the USA over the fifty-year period of the John Jay Report. The 100 convicted clergy therefore represent less than 0.1% of the total number of US based Roman Catholic clergy over the period. Of the 4,392 accused clergy, 3,300 of these accusations (~3.3% of clergy) were not investigated due to the accused having already died. Of the accusations that were investigated, 93% were reported. Of those reports, 37% were charged and of those 66% were convicted, making a total of 23% of the still alive being convicted. Of the convictions, 40% received prison sentences.

In summary, over a 50-year period, out of more than 100,000 priests deacons and religious order clergy, 4,392 (~4.4%) were accused of sexual abuse, 252 (<0.26%) were convicted and 100 (<0.1%) sentenced to prison.

== Nature of the problem ==
The John Jay study analyzed allegations of sexual abuse gathered via surveys of Catholic dioceses.

=== Allegations ===
The period covered by the John Jay study began in 1950 and ended in 2002.

Of the 11,000 allegations reported by bishops in the John Jay study, 3,300 were not investigated because the allegations were made after the accused priest had died. 6,700 allegations were substantiated, leaving 1,000 that could not be substantiated.

According to the John Jay Report, one-third of the accusations were made in 2002 and 2003. Another third of the allegations were reported between 1993 and 2001.

=== Profile of the alleged abuses ===
The John Jay study found that, "many (abusers) appear to use grooming tactics to entice children into complying with the abuse, and the abuse occurs in the home of the alleged abuser or victim." The study characterized these enticements as actions such as buying the minor gifts, letting the victim drive a car and taking youths to sporting events. The most frequent context for abuse was a social event and many priests socialized with the families of victims. Abuses occurred in a variety of places with the most common being the residence of the priest.

The John Jay report catalogued more than twenty types of sexual abuse ranging from verbal harassment to penile penetration. It said that most of the abusers engaged in multiple types of abuses. According to the report, only 9% of the accused performed acts limited to improper touching over the victim's clothes. Slightly more than 27% of the allegations involved a cleric performing oral sex, and 25% involved penile penetration or attempted penile penetration, reported the study. Most of the allegations involved touching over or under clothing.

The study said sexual abuse "includes contacts or interactions between a child and an adult when the child is being used as an object of sexual gratification for the adult." The report categorized allegations of sexual abuse even if the allegation did not involve force or genital or physical contact.

The alleged acts of abuse were in detail specified as follows:

Behavior alleged	Number of boys	%	Number of girls	%	Totals combined	%
Verbal (sex talk)	885	11%	215	12%	1,100	11.6%
Shown pornography	223	2.9%	9	0.5%	232	2.4%
Shown porn videos	142	1.8%	6	0.3%	148	1.6%
Touch over cleric's clothes	704	9.1%	165	9.2%	869	9.2%
Touch over victim's clothes	2,862	37.2%	691	38.6%	3,553	37.4%
Touch under victim's clothes	3,280	42.6%	701	39.2%	3,981	42%
Cleric disrobed	944	12.3%	177	9.9%	1,121	11,8%
Victim disrobed	1,112	14.4%	303	16.9%	1,415	14.9%
Photos of victim	169	2.2%	32	1.8%	201	2.1%
Sexual games	96	1.2%	8	0.4%	104	1.1%
Hugging and kissing	324	4.2%	175	9.8%	499	5.3%
Masturbation	663	8.6%	71	4.0%	734	7.7%
Mutual masturbation	1,049	13.6%	29	1.6%	1,078	11.4%
Cleric performed oral sex	1,186	15.4%	274	15.9%	1,460	15.4%
Victim performed oral sex	799	10.4%	115	6.4%	914	9.6%
Manual penetration	192	2.5%	195	10.9%	387	4.1%
Penetration with object	61	0.8%	26	1.5%	87	0.9%
Penile penetration	990	12.9%	213	11.9%	1,203	12.7%
Group or coerced sex	48	0.6%	4	0.2%	52	0.5%
Unspecified sex act	942	12.2%	204	11.4%	1,146	12.1%
Other	490	6.4%	87	4.9%	577	6.1%

=== Profile of the victims ===
The John Jay report found that 81% of the victims were male; and of all the victims, 22% were younger than age 10, 51% were between the ages of 11 and 14, and 27% were between the ages of 15 and 17 years.

Age in years	Number of cases	Percent of all cases	Percent combined with precedent years
1	4	0.0%	0.0%
2	11	0.1%	0.1%
3	22	0.2%	0.3%
4	41	0.5%	0.8%
5	82	1%	1.8%
6	158	1.8%	3.6%
7	220	2.5%	6.1%
8	369	4.1%	10.2%
9	362	4%	14.2%
10	752	8.4%	22.6%
11	895	10%	32.6%
12	1,323	14.7%	47.2%
13	1,141	12.8%	60%
14	1,188	13.2%	73.2%
15	1,042	11.6%	84.8%
16	769	8.6%	93.4%
17	577	6.5%	100%

=== Profile of the abusers ===
Half the priests were 35 years of age or younger at the time of the first instance of alleged abuse. Fewer than 7% of the priests were reported to have experienced physical, sexual or emotional abuse as children. Although 19% of the accused priests had alcohol or substance abuse problems, only 9% used drugs or alcohol during the alleged instances of abuse. Almost 70% of the abusive priests were ordained before 1970, after attending pre-Vatican II seminaries or seminaries that had had little time to adapt to the reforms of Vatican II.

Of the priests who were accused of sexual abuse, 59% were accused of a single allegation. 41% of the priests were the subject of more than one allegation. Just under 3% of the priests were the subject of ten or more allegations. The 149 priests who had more than 10 allegations against them accounted for 2,960 of the total number of allegations.

=== Diocesan awareness of the problem ===
In response to criticism that the Catholic hierarchy should have acted more quickly and decisively to remove priests accused of sexual misconduct, contemporary bishops have responded that the hierarchy was unaware until recent years of the danger in shuffling priests from one parish to another and in concealing the priests' problems from those they served. For example, Cardinal Roger Mahony of the Archdiocese of Los Angeles, said: "We have said repeatedly that ... our understanding of this problem and the way it's dealt with today evolved, and that in those years ago, decades ago, people didn't realize how serious this was, and so, rather than pulling people out of ministry directly and fully, they were moved."

=== Diocesan response to allegations ===
Some bishops have been heavily criticized for moving offending priests from parish to parish, where they still had personal contact with children, rather than seeking to have them permanently removed from the priesthood. Instead of reporting the incidents to police, many dioceses directed the offending priests to seek psychological treatment and assessment. According to the John Jay Report, nearly 40% of priests alleged to have committed sexual abuse participated in treatment programs. The more allegations a priest had, the more likely he was to participate in treatment.

The Church was widely criticized when it was discovered that some bishops knew about some of the alleged crimes committed, but reassigned the accused instead of seeking to have them permanently removed from the priesthood. In defense of this practice, some have pointed out that public school administrators engaged in a similar manner when dealing with accused teachers, as did the Boy Scouts of America.

Some bishops and psychiatrists have asserted that the prevailing psychology of the times suggested that people could be cured of such behavior through counseling. Many of the abusive priests had received counseling before being reassigned.

According to the study, 3% of all priests against whom allegations were made were convicted and about 2% received prison sentences.

From a legal perspective, the most serious criticism aside from the incidents of child sexual abuse themselves was by the bishops, who failed to report accusations to the police. In response to the failure to report abuse to the police, lawmakers have changed the law to make reporting of abuse to police compulsory. For example, in 2002 Massachusetts passed a law requiring religious officials to report the abuse of children.

== See also ==
- Barbara Blaine – founder of SNAP (Survivors Network for those Abused by Priests)
- Crimen sollicitationis
- Deliver Us from Evil (2006 film)
- Ferns Report – on sexual abuse in the Roman Catholic Diocese of Ferns, Ireland
- Homosexuality and Roman Catholic priests
- National Review Board
- Pontifical Commission for the Protection of Minors
- Pontifical Secret
- Religious abuse
- Roman Catholic sex abuse cases
- Roman Catholic sex abuse cases by country
- "Sex Crimes and the Vatican" – Panorama documentary episode
- Sexual abuse
- Sexual misconduct
- Spiritual abuse
- Spotlight (film)
- Survivors Network of those Abused by Priests
