= Hermenegild Makoro =

South African religious sister

Sister Hermenegild Makoro CPS
- Title: Secretary-General of the Southern African Catholic Bishops' Conference

Religious life
- Religion: Christianity
- Denomination: Roman Catholicism
- Institute: Missionary Sisters of the Precious Blood (1976-present)

Senior posting
- Period in office: 2012-present
- Predecessor: Father Vincent Brennan, SMA

Hermenegild Makoro (born December 7, 1951) is a South African religious sister, currently serving as the Secretary-General of the Southern African Catholic Bishops' Conference since 2012.

== Early life and education ==
Makoro was born in the district of Mount Fletcher in Eastern Cape Province, the second of four children and only daughter.

She received a Bachelor of Theology from the University of Natal and an education degree from the University of Transkei.

== Service ==
Since 1976, Makoro has been a member of the Missionary Sisters of the Precious Blood in the Diocese of Mthatha. She has served in a variety of roles, including teacher at Mariazell High School, coordinator of the Diocesan Catechetical Team, coordinator of Diocese Leadership training, and Provincial superior of the Missionary Sisters.

From 2005 until 2012, Makoro served as Associate Secretary-General of the Bishops' Conference prior to her appointment as secretary-general.

In 2014, she was appointed by Pope Francis to serve on the Pontifical Commission for the Protection of Minors. She was reappointed to a second term by the pontiff in 2018 and joined the Work Group for the Education of Families and Communities.

Makoro currently serves on the board of directors for the Catholic Health Care Association. Makoro ministered to Winnie Mandela before her death.
