= Sexual abuse scandal in the Roman Catholic Diocese of Honolulu =

The sexual abuse scandal in Honolulu diocese is a significant chapter in the series of Catholic sex abuse cases in the United States and Ireland.

== Accusations against clergy ==
One plaintiff won $3.5 million (reduced to $1.04 million on appeal) in the case of Thomas Adamson. Allegations against Adamson spanned 22 years, but two Catholic dioceses kept shuttling him into new assignments.
