= Virtus (program) =

US program of the Roman Catholic Church

VIRTUS is a program created by the National Catholic Risk Retention Group in the United States with a "Protecting God's Children" component that combats sexual abuse of children in the Church. It is currently in use in over 80 dioceses in the United States.

== History ==
In response to the growing public awareness of child sexual abuse in the Catholic Church, Monsignor Kevin McCoy and Rev. Edward J. Arsenault of the National Catholic Risk Retention Group asked their colleagues how sexual abuse could be prevented.

This led to a convening of national experts in Washington, DC in March 1998, where discussion led to the concept of the VIRTUS program. An Ad Hoc committee was chosen by the National Catholic Board of Directors to implement the project.

== Goal and implementation ==
The VIRTUS program began with a consulting team, including:

- Rev. Edward J. Arsenault
- Rev. John P. Beal, J.C.D.
- Barbara Bonner, Ph.D.
- David Finkelhor, Ph.D.
- Jack McCalmon, Esq.
- Michael Morton, M.S.
- Fr. Stephen Rossetti, D. Min., Ph.D.
- Phyllis Willerscheidt

The goal of the VIRTUS program is primarily to be proactive instead of reactive when dealing with child sexual abuse. To prevent sexual abuse, VIRTUS advocates five steps:

1. Knowing the warning signs of abuse
2. Controlling access to children
3. Monitoring programs involving children
4. Being aware of how children behave
5. Communicating concerns

VIRTUS focuses on educating teachers, parents, and other adults who interact with children about sexual abuse and providing them with information to help prevent abuse. This takes place in 'awareness sessions' led by trained facilitators. The awareness sessions consist of videos, worksheets, and discussions. The videos incorporate interviews with both victims and convicted perpetrators.

== Related programs ==
In addition to its most common Protecting God's Children program, VIRTUS also has Victim Advocacy Training and VIRTUS Investigation Training. The Protecting God's Children program is also available in an online form.

The creation of the VIRTUS program is similar to efforts in other Christian churches to help prevent child sexual abuse. One such program is Safe Sanctuaries, through the United Methodist Church.

== See also ==
- Roman Catholic Church sex abuse scandal
- Roman Catholic priests accused of sex offenses
- Crimen sollicitationis
