= Donald Cozzens =

American Roman-Catholic priest (1939–2021)

Donald Cozzens

Donald Cozzens (May 17, 1939 – December 9, 2021) was an American Catholic priest, author, and lecturer.

== Biography ==
Cozzens was a president-rector and professor of pastoral theology at Saint Mary Seminary and Graduate School of Theology in Wickliffe, Ohio. In his writings, he tackled the themes of priestly celibacy, homosexuality and sexual abuse in the Catholic Church.

Cozzens died from complications of COVID-19 in Mayfield Heights, Ohio, on December 9, 2021, at the age of 82.

== Bibliography ==
- The Spirituality of the Diocesan Priest, 1997 ISBN 978-0814624210
- The Changing Face of the Priesthood, 2000 ISBN 978-0814625040
- Sacred Silence: Denial and the Crisis in the Church, 2002 ISBN 978-0814627792
- Faith That Dares to Speak, 2004 ISBN 978-0814630181
- Freeing Celibacy, 2006 ISBN 978-1920721305
- Master of Ceremonies, 2014 (novel) ISBN 978-0879469931
- Under Pain of Mortal Sin, 2018 (novel) ISBN 978-0879469733
