= Sexual abuse scandal in the Roman Catholic Archdiocese of Los Angeles =

Mostly events of the 1970s through 1990s

The sexual abuse scandal in the Los Angeles archdiocese covered events that were documented beginning in the 1930s, but most publicity was related to events of the 1970s through 1990s. Priests accused of molesting children or adults in the parish were typically reassigned, without informing new parishes of charges against them, as the church protected its staff.

In 1989, the Archdiocese of Los Angeles established its first policies to avert sexual abuse by clergy of minors. Policies for investigating sexual abuse allegations were established in 1994. In 2002, a zero-tolerance policy toward sexual abuse was enacted and the archdiocese suspended 12 priests from public ministry. That same year, it started an unsuccessful court battle to shield the personnel records of clergy accused of sexual abuse. The archdiocese released an apology to victims of sexual abuse along with a report on clergy with credible accusations in 2004.

The archdiocese reached a $60 million sexual abuse settlement in 2006, then a $660 million settlement with 508 victims the next year. Changes in the laws in 2019 and 2023 led to a large increase in sexual abuse lawsuits against the archdiocese. In October 2024, in an attempt to settle all outstanding sexual abuse claims, the archdiocese announced a $880 million settlement for 1,350 victims of 300 clergy, bringing their total payouts to more than $1.5 billion.

By 2025, 15 priests, one permanent deacon and one religious brother, all of whom had worked in the archdiocese, had been convicted or pleaded guilty to felonies or misdemeanors related to sexual abuses. Their charges included possession of child pornography, sexual battery and commission of lewd acts. Their sentences ranged from probation to 20 years in state prison.

== History ==
=== Establishment of sexual abuse policies ===
After the arrests of several priests in the archdiocese on sexual abuse charges in the later 1980s, Cardinal Roger Mahony in 1989 established the first archdiocesan policies on sexual abuse by clergy. These included prohibiting priests from having physical content with minors or allowing them overnight stays in rectories. The policies were updated in 1994 to create a process for investigating sexual abuse allegations; a Sexual Abuse Advisory Board composed of priests, attorneys, social workers and relatives of victims was created.

In 2002, Mahony established a "zero tolerance" policy that permanently banned from ministry any priest, deacon or religious brother or sister with a credible allegation of sexual abuse of a minor. It also mandated the immediate notification of law enforcement about the allegation.

In 2004, Mahony released Report to the People of God: Clergy Sexual Abuse Archdiocese of Los Angeles. This was a compilation of information of sexual abuse cases in the archdiocese from 1930 to 2003. The report stated that 656 individuals had accused 244 priests, deacons, brothers and seminarians. Of the 16 diocesan priests still in ministry at that time, the archdiocese determined that the accusations against 12 of them were not credible. The remaining four priests were still under investigation at that time.

=== Legal developments 2002 to 2006 ===
In 2002, lawyers for sexual abuse victims went to court to force the archdiocese to release its personal records on priests accused of sexual abuse. These records would show any attempts by the archdiocese to shield these priests from public exposure and criminal prosecution. The Los Angeles County Superior Court ordered the archdiocese to release them in September 2004. The archdiocese appealed the case to the US Supreme Court in February 2006, saying that it was trying to protect its First Amendment rights under the US Constitution. The court refused to hear the appeal. This decision forced the archdiocese to comply with a subpoena from the Los Angeles District Attorney for letters to the former priests and notes from counseling sessions conducted by the archdiocese.

The State of California had eased its statute of limitations requirements in 1993 for cases that were previously too old to be prosecuted. It was challenged in court in 1998 by a Mr. Stogner, who had been accused of sexual abuse. The case went to the US Supreme Court, which ruled against California in 2004. As a result, prosecutors were forced to drop sexual abuse charges against three archdiocesan priests (Michael Baker, Lawrence Lovell and George Miller).

The archdiocese agreed to pay a $60 million settlement in December 2006 to 45 lawsuits over two pending cases of sexual abuse. According to the Associated Press, 22 priests were named as abusers in the settlement, with cases reaching back as the 1930s.

=== First major settlement ===
On July 16, 2007, Mahony announced a $660 million (£324 million) settlement with over 500 victims of sexual abuse. A judge was to administer the payments, with each victim receiving approximately $1.3M. Mahony described the abuse as a "terrible sin and crime". The archdiocese announced the settlement one day before Mahony was scheduled to testify in a sexual abuse lawsuit.

One of the victims compensated in the $660 settlement was Rita Milla, a parishioner who was sexually abused by seven priests as a girl and young adult. At age 16, she was first abused by the priest Santiago Tamayo in Los Angeles. Milla said the Catholic Church's failure to help her caused her loss of faith.

In January 2008, the archdiocese announced the sale of the Archdiocesan Catholic Center in Los Angeles for $31 million. The proceeds were used to fund the $660 million settlement in 2007. Archbishop José Horacio Gómez announced in February 2013 that he was banning his predecessor, Cardinal Mahony, from a public ministry or administrative duties due to his failures in handling sexually-abusive clergy in the archdiocese.

=== Legal developments 2019 to 2023 ===
California passed a law in early 2019 that opened a three-year window allowing sexual abuse lawsuits that were not eligible due to the statute of limitations. From May to December 2019, the archdiocese provided documents to California State Attorney General Xavier Becerra in preparation for the upcoming lawsuits. In January 2020, it was reported that the archdiocese had paid $1.9 million to settle a sexual abuse case against one of its former priests. In February 2020, a lawsuit was filed against the archdiocese, Mahony and convicted former priest Michael Baker.

In December 2020, a lawsuit under the Racketeer Influenced and Corrupt Organizations Act (RICO) alleged that the archdiocese used the Diocese of Tucson as a "dumping ground" for clergy who were accused of sexual abuse while serving in the Archdiocese of Los Angeles.

The archdiocese in March 2021 released a consolidated list of clergy with credible accusations of sexual abuse. It included the names listed in the 2004 People of God list with names added in the intervening years. California Governor Gavin Newsom signed a law in October 2023 that permanently removed the statute of limitations in California for sexual abuse cases involving minors.

=== Second major settlement ===
In October 2024, Archbishop Gómez announced a financial settlement of $880 million to compensate 1,350 individuals who had been sexually abused as minors by priests operating in the archdiocese. This was the largest settlement at that time by any archdiocese or diocese in the United States for sexual abuse claims. The settlement also required the archdiocese to release the personnel files of all sexual abuse offenders. In announcing the settlement, Gómez stated that "...my hope is that this settlement will provide some measure of healing for what these men and women have suffered."

== Clergy convicted of sexual abuse crimes ==
This is a list of priests, religious brothers and permanent deacons who worked in the Archdiocese of Los Angeles who were convicted of sexual abuse crimes in American courts as of 2025.

=== Arturo Federico Ahumada ===
In June 2022, Ahumada, a permanent deacon at Epiphany Catholic Church in South El Monte, was convicted of providing illicit materials to minors and one count of misdemeanor sexual battery. In March 2021, he had hosted a 15-year-old boy and a 16-year-old boy at his residence several times for dinner. He played pornographic films for the boys and sexually assaulted one of them. Ahumada pleaded no contest to the charges and was sentenced to one year in the Los Angeles County Jail and a 44-month suspended sentence in state prison.

=== Michael Stephen Baker ===
In 1986, during a retreat for priests in California, Baker confessed to Archbishop Mahony that he had sexually assaulted two brothers, starting in 1984 when they were ages five and seven. Mahony then sent Baker to the Servants of the Paraclete treatment center in Jemez Springs, New Mexico, for six months. When Baker returned to Los Angeles, Mahony assigned him to adult ministries. Unknown to the archdiocese, when the boys' family moved to Mexico in 1986, Baker paid airfare for the boys to visit him in California and Arizona. The archdiocese eventually removed Baker from ministry; he was laicized in 2000.

In 2003, Baker was charged with 34 counts of molestation involving six victims, but the charges were dismissed when the US Supreme Court ruled against a California law allowing prosecution for crimes committed before 1988. In January 2006, Baker was arrested in Los Angeles on suspicion of committing lewd acts with a child. In 1994, Baker had established a relationship with Luis, a 14-year-old altar server at St. Columbkille Parish in Los Angeles. Baker pleaded guilty in 2007 to 12 felony counts for sexually abusing Lius and another boy and was sentenced to ten years in state prison.

=== Honesto Bayranta Bismonte ===
Bismonte, a priest at St. Joseph Catholic Church in Pomona, was arrested in April 2002 on allegations of sexually molesting two girls, ages eight and 11. The crimes took place at an apartment rented by the girls' aunt in Fontana, where Bismonte was residing. A school official had reported the allegations to the police. One girl stated that Bismonte reached under her skirt to fondle her skin; the other said he fondled her over her clothes. Bismonte pleaded guilty to a misdemeanor in September 2003 and was sentenced to two years of probation.

=== Luis Jose Cuevas ===
Cuevas, a priest at St. Athanasius Church in Long Beach, was arrested on allegations of groping two adult women and a 14-year-old girl, starting in 2010. In December 2012, he pleaded no contest to one felony count of committing a lewd act on a child and two misdemeanor sexual battery charges. Cuevas was sentenced in January 2013 to five years of probation and 40 hours of community service.

=== Gerald Fessard ===
Fessard pleaded guilty to battery and sexual molestation of minors in 1987 and received a sentence of probation. He was a priest serving at the San Fernando Mission Rey de España in Mission Hills, which at that time had a residential minor seminary for boys studying for the priesthood. Seven boys reported that when checking the boys' dormitory at night, Fessard would put his hands under their bedcovers and fondle their genitals.

=== Stephen C. Hernandez ===
In January 2006, Hernandez, a retired priest from Our Lady of Guadalupe Parish in El Sereno, pleaded no contest to a misdemeanor charge of contributing to the delinquency of a minor. He had met the boy at the Eastlake Juvenile Hall in Lincoln Heights while counseling children in custody there. The victim said that Hernandez fondled him on several occasions in the church rectory and at the boy's home. Hernandez received three years of probation.

=== Patrick Kelly ===
Kelly, a visiting priest from Ireland at Our Lady of Lourdes Parish in Tujunga, was accused in 1991 of sexually abusing a girl. During a counseling session with the victim at her home, Kelly pulled her onto his lap, then kissed and fondled her. After she reported the assault to police, Kelly fled to Ireland in December 1991. He returned to California in 1992 and in April of that year pleaded no contest to a single misdemeanor charge of sexual battery. Kelly was sentenced to three years of probation. Other abuses allegations later arose against him in Los Angeles and the Diocese of Rockville Centre in New York.

=== Lawrence Joseph Lovell ===
During the early 1980s Lovell, a priest with the Claretian Order, was assigned as a youth pastor at the San Gabriel Mission in San Gabriel. He was convicted of child molestation in 1986 and given three months of probation. He was removed from ministry by the Clarentians that same year. In March 2003, Lovell was arrested on charges of committing lewd acts with four boys under the age of 14 at the mission. However, the prosecution was forced to drop the case against Lovell after the US Supreme Court ruled the California law on sexual abuse lawsuits was unconstitutional.

Lovell was charged again in 2004 with sexually abusing minors at the San Gabriel Mission. He pleaded no contest to child molestation and attempted sexual conduct with a minor. The court sentenced him to 20 years in state prison.

=== Rodolfo Martinez-Guevara ===
Martinez-Guevara, a priest with the Missionaries of the Holy Spirit in Long Beach, was arrested in September 2023 for possession of child pornography. Investigators discovered over 600 illegal images and videos on his electronic devices. Martinez-Guevara pleaded guilty in October 2024 and was sentenced in December 2024 to one year in the Ventura County Jail.

=== George Michael Miller ===
Miller, a priest forced into retirement in 1997, was arrested in December 2002 on charges of sexual assault. In 2001, two men accused him of molesting them when they were minors at Guardian Angel Church in Pacoima during the 1970s and 1980s. The accusers said that Miller abused them at the church rectory, at a beach house and at their homes.The archdiocese removed Miller from public ministry and sent him away for treatment. The prosecution case against Miller was dropped after the US Supreme Court ruled the California law on sexual abuse lawsuits was unconstitutional.

In July 2007 Miller was arrested again on three counts each of lewd acts on a child and sodomy of a person under 14. He was accused of molesting a young teenager from Guardian Angel Church between 1988 and 1991. Miller pleaded guilty in December 2008 to the 2007 charges and admitted guilt to the 2003 charges that had been dropped. He was sentenced in January 2009 to three years in state prison.

=== Carlos Rene Rodriguez ===
In 1987, Rodriguez, a newly ordained priest, confessed to the archdiocese that he had sexually molested a child at a Los Angeles parish. The archdiocese sent him for treatment to the Saint Luke Institute, a Catholic treatment facility for priests in Silver Spring, Maryland. After his discharge, the archdiocese assigned him to minister to Hispanic families in the Santa Barbara area. After becoming close with the Baragan family in Santa Paula during the early 1990s, he started sexually assaulting the two Baragan brothers. One of them, Manuel Baragan, reported Rodriguez to the bishop for their region, but the bishop dismissed the accusations. In 2004, Rodriguez was arrested on charges of sexually assaulting the Baragan brothers. He pleaded guilty to the charges that year and was sentenced to eight years in state prison.

=== Donald Patrick Roemer ===
In late 1980, a mother in Thousand Oaks filed a complaint with police about Roemer's actions with her son. Roemer was arrested in January 1981 for committing a lewd or lascivious act. The archdiocese immediately put him on leave. Roemer pleaded no contest to three counts of these charges and was committed to the Atascadero State Hospital in Atascadero for two years. After his release, the archdiocese did not return him to active ministry.

=== Alexander Salazar ===
The archdiocese announced Salazar's resignation in 2018 as one of its auxiliary bishops. It was revealed then that in 2002, an individual had accused Salazar of sexual abusing them when they were a minor. The police brought charges against Salazar in 2002 but the district attorney declined prosecution. Despite the accusation, Salazar was promoted to bishop in 2004. The Los Angeles Archdiocese claimed they were made aware of the accusations in 2005. Salazar was permitted to remain in ministry under certain "precautionary measures" that have never been made public. Salazar was also not included on several lists of credibly accused priests, despite the L.A. Archdiocese knowing for 13 years that Salazar had been accused of misconduct. Local authorities reopened the case against Salazar in February 2021. In August 2023, Salazar pleaded no contest to two felony counts of PC288(a)-F Lewd or Lascivious Acts With Child Under 14 Years. Per the plea agreement, Salazar received a six-year prison sentence (suspended), five years of formal probation, required registration as a sex offender, and other sentencing requirements. Salazar appears on the Megan's Law website as a registered sex offender. Despite being criminally convicted, Bishop Salazar continues to reside at an active Los Angeles Archdiocese parish.

=== John Anthony Salazar-Jimenez ===
Salazar-Jimenez was a priest of the Piarist Order who taught in 1987 at St. Lucy's Catholic Church in East Los Angeles. A 13-year-old boy reported abuse to a teacher and the principal, but they did nothing. When a 14-year-old boy filed a complaint, the archdiocese forced Salazar-Jimenez to turn himself in to the police. He went on trial and pleaded guilty to felony counts of oral copulation and one count of lewd or lascivious acts with a child. Salazar-Jimenez was sent to prison for six years, was released after four years.

After Salazar-Jimenez was released from prison, the archdiocese sent him to the Servants of the Paraclete treatment facility. While he was there, Bishop Leroy T. Matthiesen of the Diocese of Amarillo recruited Salazar-Jimenez to serve in Texas after his discharge. Archbishop Mahony warned Matthiesen about Salazar-Jimenez, but the bishop was not dissuaded. He assigned Salazar-Jimenez to parishes in the diocese without any mention of his criminal history.

In November 2002, Salazar-Jimenez was charged with molesting a boy at St. Bernard High School in Playa Del Ray, California, and an altar boy at St. Teresita Church in Los Angeles during the 1980s. He was later accused of abusing children in Texas. In 2005, Salazar-Jimenez was convicted of sexually assaulting an 18-year-old man at a wedding reception in Dallas County in Texas. Salazar-Jimenez was convicted and sentenced to life in prison.

=== Avdon Serratos ===
Serratos, a visiting priest from Mexico was arrested in August 2003 in Reseda on charges of sexually assaulting a 15-year-old girl. The crime occurred a few days earlier when Serratos was conducting a private confession with the victim. During this session, he kissed and fondled the girl He was charged with four counts of lewd acts with a child. In February 2004, Serratos pleaded no contest to the charges and was sentenced to one year in the Los Angeles County Jail.

=== Robert M. Van Handel ===
In 1975, the Franciscans of California assigned Van Handel to serve as a teacher at the St. Anthony's High School Seminary in Santa Barbara. Over the next 18 years, he also served as choirmaster for the Santa Barbara Boys Choir. The seminary closed in 1987. In May 1992, a man reported to the Franciscans that he had been sexually assaulted numerous times by Van Handel when a student at St. Anthony's. The Franciscans launched an investigation into the seminary, which found that 11 priests, including Van Handel, had sexually assaulted numerous children over time. He would photograph boys in the nude, tickle them or tie them up with rope.

Van Handel was sent by the Franciscans for treatment at the Pacific Treatment Associates Center in Santa Cruz. He was indicted in 1994 on sexual abuse charges. His therapist forwarded to the court a copy of the priest's sexual autobiography, written by Van Handel. The therapist estimated that Van Handel had sexually assaulted 150 boys while directing the Santa Barbara Boys Choir. He pleaded guilty in 1994 to one count of lewd and lascivious acts with a minor and was sentenced to eight years in prison.

=== Michael Edwin Wempe ===
In 1987, the archdiocese learned that Wempe, a priest, had sexually abused a boy at St. Sebastian Parish in Santa Paula. When the parish vicar discovered that Wempe had been spending nights with two fatherless boys, the vicar alerted the archdiocese. They sent Wempe to the Servants of the Paraclete treatment center for six months. After his return in 1988, the archdiocese assigned him as a chaplain at Cedars-Sinai Hospital in Los Angeles. That same year, two young men complained about Wempe to the archdiocese; Wempe kept his hospital assignment. In 2002, it was revealed in the media that Wempe, from 1990 to 1995. had sexually assaulted a boy in his car and hospital office.

In June 2003, Wempe was arrested on charges of sexually assaulting five children between 1977 to 1986. However, the case was eventually dismissed when the US Supreme Court in 2002 overturned a California law that extended the time limit for sexual abuse prosecutions. Wempe was indicted again in 2004 after a new victim pressed charges. In November 2005, Wempe's attorney admitted that Wempe had previously molested 13 boys.

=== Philip Mark Wolfe ===
A brother of the Franciscan Order of Friars Minor, Wolfe pleaded no contest to engaging in oral sex with a minor. Wolfe had been a choirmaster at St. Anthony's Seminary of Santa Barbara, a minor seminary in Santa Barbara run by the Franciscans. Wolfe was sentenced to one year in state prison and five years of probation. He committed suicide in 1994.

== See also ==
- Child sexual abuse
- Religious abuse
- Sexual abuse
- Sexual misconduct
- Spiritual abuse
- St. John's Seminary (California)
