= George Reardon =

George Reardon (May 23, 1930 − September 6, 1998) was an American physician from Hartford, Connecticut, charged with abusing hundreds or possibly thousands of children.

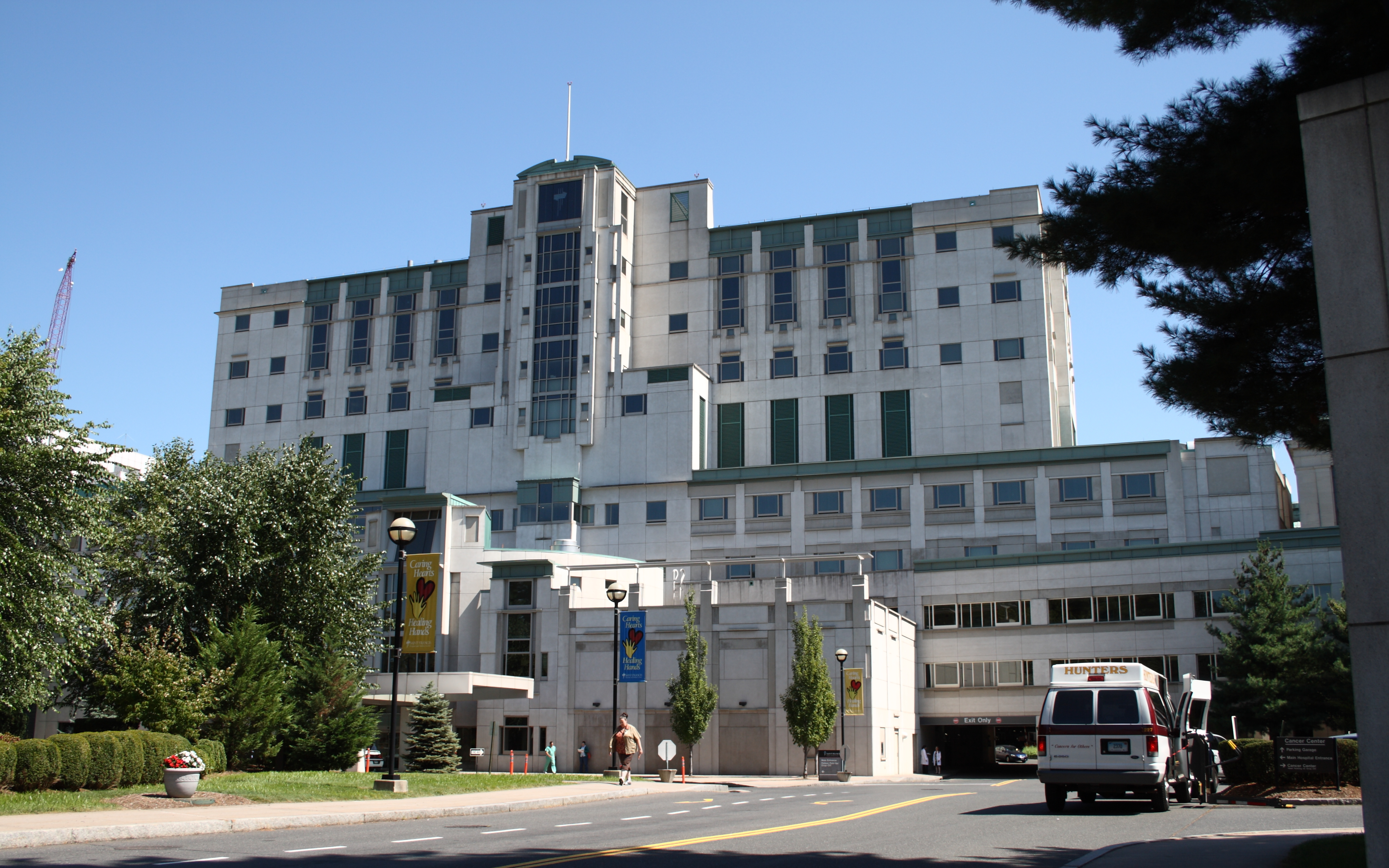
St. Francis Hospital building at 114 Woodland Street, Hartford, Connecticut

== Professional history ==
George Reardon was a physician, and later, chief of endocrinology at Saint Francis Hospital & Medical Center, a hospital run by the Roman Catholic Archdiocese of Hartford. He worked at the hospital from 1963 to 1993. Early on, there had already been indications of inappropriate conduct with children. In a letter from 1970, Hartford County Medical Association recommended Reardon to take the precaution of having someone else present to prevent future accusations. Despite these warnings, Reardon continued to invite children to a room in the hospital with a bed and camera equipment, where he was allegedly conducting a study on sexual growth. At least some of the victims were told that he was researching adolescence.

Reardon was forced to resign in 1993 as victims testified about his sexual abuse. In 1995, he was prohibited from practicing medicine in Connecticut or any other state. Reardon died of a heart attack in 1998.

== Evidence ==
In 2007, the new owner of Reardon's former home discovered a cache of child pornography hidden behind a false wall. This cache contained approximately 50,000 images as 35mm slides and more than 100 videos of child pornography, presumably created by Reardon.

Authorities examined the cache in an effort to identify and notify previously unidentified victims. By March 2011, approximately 250 victims were identified. One victim claimed to have been abused by Reardon twenty times.

== Opposition to bill ==
A bill to abolish the statutes of limitations to help the victims claim compensation (House Bill 5473) was opposed by the bishops of Connecticut, Bishop Henry J. Mansell, Roman Catholic Archdiocese of Hartford, Bishop William E. Lori, Roman Catholic Diocese of Bridgeport, and Bishop Michael R. Cote, Roman Catholic Diocese of Norwich. Prior to enactment, the laws allowed alleged minor victims 30 years past the age of 18 to take legal action.

The bishops raised concerns that the bill would allow claims that are 70 years or older, in which "key individuals are deceased, memories have been faded, and documents and other evidence have been lost." They further said that the majority of cases would be driven by "trial lawyers hoping to profit from these cases." Addressing the priests, the public and the parishes' members, they wrote: "This bill would put all Church institutions, including your parish, at risk. (...) That is why it is important for you to join other Catholics across Connecticut in opposing this legislation."

The bill was blocked. In 2010, there were 135 victims suing for compensation. Their lawyers claimed at court that the hospital's owner did not act responsibly. Under then-current law another 60 victims could not sue for compensation because they were older than 48 years, a circumstance that many people believed to be highly unfair.
