= National Review Board =

The National Review Board for the Protection of Children and Young People is a committee created in 2002 by the United States Conference of Catholic Bishops in order to monitor the implementation of the Charter for the Protection of Children and Young People in the wake of the clerical abuse scandal in the United States.

The Board was also charged with investigating the scandal, which it did in part by commissioning the John Jay College to conduct a survey of Church records in order to define the nature and scope of the abuse committed by priests over the period between 1950 and 2002. The results of that survey were released in 2004 in what has come to be known as the "John Jay Report" or "Nature and Scope report." In parallel with the John Jay College survey the Board conducted interviews with a variety of people, both inside and outside the Church, who were well placed to comment on the scandal, and on the basis of these interviews prepared a more broad-ranging report of its own.

Whereas the John Jay College report was (as intended) primarily a factual summary of the data collected in the College's survey of Church records, the Board's own report sought to interpret these data and its other findings in order to explain why the "epidemic" of clerical abuse had occurred and to identify the appropriate steps to avoid any repetition.

== See also ==
- Pontifical Commission for the Protection of Minors
- Anne M. Burke, interim chair from 2002 to 2004
- Francesco Cesareo, President of Assumption College and chair since 2013
