= Pontifical Commission for the Protection of Minors =

Commission of the Holy See for the safeguarding of minors

The Pontifical Commission for the Protection of Minors (Note: Italian: Pontificia Commissione per la Tutela dei Minori; Latin: Tutela Minorum) is a pontifical commission within the Roman Curia of the Catholic Church instituted by Pope Francis on 22 March 2014 as an advisory agency serving the pope. Since 5 June 2022, the Commission has been part of the Dicastery for the Doctrine of the Faith, operating with its officials and according to its norms.

Cardinal Seán O'Malley of Boston served as its first president from 17 December 2014 to 5 July 2025, when he was succeeded by Archbishop Thibault Verny of Chambéry.

== Task ==
Pope Francis' chirograph for the Institution of a Pontifical Commission for the Protection of Minors (22 March 2014) states:

The aim of the Commission is to promote the protection of the dignity of minors and vulnerable adults, using the forms and methods, consonant with the nature of the Church, which they consider most appropriate, as well as through their cooperation with individuals and groups pursuing these same objectives.

Francis' apostolic constitution Praedicate evangelium (19 March 2022) states:

The Pontifical Commission assists diocesan/eparchial Bishops, Episcopal Conferences and Eastern Hierarchical Structures, Superiors of Institutes of Consecrated Life and Societies of Apostolic Life and their Conferences in developing appropriate strategies and procedures, through Guidelines to protect minors and vulnerable persons from sexual abuse and to provide an appropriate response to such conduct by clergy and members of Institutes of Consecrated Life and Societies of Apostolic Life, according to canonical norms and taking into account the requirements of civil law.

== Organisation ==
The pope appoints the Commission's president, secretary and members to five-year terms. The members need not be clerics; all must be "distinguished by science, proven ability and pastoral experience". The Commission advises the pope and proposes "initiatives for the protection of minors and vulnerable persons". It assists bishops and their organizations as well as all forms of religious associations "in developing appropriate strategies and procedures [...] to protect minors and vulnerable persons from sexual abuse and to provide an adequate response to such conduct by the clergy and other religious. In doing so it follows "canonical norms" and considers as well "the requirements of civil law". Though part of the Dicastery for the Doctrine of the Faith, the Commission has its officials and operates according to its norms.

== History ==
=== Creation ===
On 5 December 2013, following a meeting of the Council of Cardinal Advisers, Cardinal Seán O'Malley announced that Pope Francis had decided to create a commission for the protection of minors to evaluate current programs, propose initiatives, and identify personnel to implement them, "including lay persons, religious and priests with responsibilities for the safety of children, in relations with the victims, in mental health, in the application of the law, etc." Pope Francis created the Pontifical Commission for the Protection of Minors and named its first eight members on 22 March 2014. They were tasked with drafting the Commission's statutes to "define its tasks and competencies". (Note: Federico Lombardi, head of the Holy See Press Office, enlarged upon their task: "This initial group is now called to work expeditiously to assist in several tasks, including: participating in the deliberations concerning the Commission's final structure; describing the scope of its responsibilities; and developing the names of additional candidates, especially from other continents and countries, who can offer service to the Commission.") (Note: In a departure from Vatican practice, the members were listed in alphabetical order without distinguishing between clerical rank or lay status. The eight were: Catherine Bonnet, a child psychiatrist and author of works on "the effects of sexual abuse and exploitation on children"; Marie Collins, abuse survivor, "campaigner for the rights of abuse victims"; Sheila Hollins, former president of the Royal College of Psychiatrists, current president of the British Medical Association; Cardinal Seán O'Malley, Archbishop of Boston; Claudio Papale, professor of canon law at the Pontifical Urban University; Hanna Suchocka, former Prime Minister of Poland and former ambassador to the Holy See; Humberto Miguel Yáñez, SJ, Director of the Department of Moral Theology at the Pontifical Gregorian University, former student of Pope Francis; Hans Zollner, SJ, President of the Centre for Child Protection of the Pontifical Gregorian University and Director and Professor of the Institute of Psychology)

On 10 September 2014, Father Robert W. Oliver BH, the chief prosecutor of clergy for sex abuse crimes at the Congregation for the Doctrine of the Faith, was named the Commission's secretary. On 17 December 2014, Pope Francis added eight members to the Commission, including a second abuse survivor, Peter Saunders, head of a UK-based organization of sexual abuse survivors, and experts from five continents, bringing the total to 17 (the original eight, the secretary, and the additional eight), eight of them women. (Note: The other seven new members were: Krysten Winter-Green, expert in theology and social work; Bill Kilgallon, director of the New Zealand Catholic church's Office for Professional Standards; Sister Hermenegild Makoro, secretary general of the Southern African Catholic Bishops' Conference; Kathleen McCormack, longtime director of the social services agency of the Diocese of Wollongong; Sister Kayula Lesa, Zambian activist against human trafficking, member of the African Forum for Church Social Teaching; Gabriel Dy-Liacco, a Filipino who teaches at the Regent University School of Psychology and Counseling in Maryland; Rev. Luis Manuel Ali Herrera, Colombian psychologist and professor of pastoral psychology) This announcement identified O'Malley as president of the Commission for the first time.

The Commission met for the first time on 6–8 February 2015, and on 8 May released the Commission's statutes, which were dated 21 April 2015.

The statutes declared the Commission "an autonomous institution attached to the Holy See". It was to propose initiatives to promote local responsibility, based on extensive consultations church officials, including local jurisdictions, organizations of religious, and Curial departments. Its maximum membership was set at 18, appointed to three-year terms. The terms of the president and secretary may be renewed. It details the procedures for meetings, setting the Commission's agenda, and delegating questions to work groups. The norms described were given force for three years, at which point the members could propose modifications.

=== Developments ===
In 2015, Commission member Marie Collins, former victim of abuse, has criticized the Vatican for failing to sufficiently fund the panel, a problem she claims could jeopardize the commission's work. The commission has been advised to consider raising its own funds to complete the work.

In February 2016, the commission members watched the Oscar-nominated film Spotlight together. The movie dramatizes the 2001 experience of the Pulitzer Prize-winning investigative team at the Boston Globe as they uncovered and exposed systematic sex abuse and subsequent cover-ups by clergy and members of the church hierarchy in Boston.

In February 2017, Marie Collins resigned from the commission stating: "there are still men at that level in the church who would resist or hinder work to protect children in 2017, it's just not acceptable".

=== 2018 relaunch ===
Upon the expiration of the members' terms in December 2017, on 17 February 2018 Pope Francis relaunched the commission with major personnel changes. He reappointed O'Malley, Oliver and six other members and adding nine new members, eight men and eight women. (Note: Those reappointed were: Gabriel Dy-Liacco, Luis Manuel Alí Herrera, who was now an auxiliary bishop of Bogotá, Fr. Hans Zollner, SJ, Prof. Hannah Suchocka, Sister Kayula Lesa, and Sister Hermenegild Makoro. The new members were: Prof. Benyam Dawit Mezmur; Sister Arina Gonsalves; Neville Owen; Sinalelea Fe’ao; Myriam Wijlens; Prof. Ernesto Caffo; Sister Jane Bertelsen; Teresa Kettelkamp; Nelson Giovanelli Rosendo Dos Santos) Several of those members of the commission are victims of clerical sexual abuse, but the commission said it would respect their decision not to identify themselves publicly.

=== Merger ===
Since 5 June 2022, the Commission has been part of the Dicastery for the Doctrine of the Faith, operating with its own officials and according to its own norms, as prescribed by the apostolic constitution Praedicate evangelium.

Pope Francis explained that the Commission was placed there because that Dicastery "deals with sexual abuse on the part of members of the clergy" and it was "not possible to have a 'satellite commission', circling around but unattached to the organization chart." He told the members of the Commission: "Someone might think that this could put at risk your freedom of thought and action, or even take away importance from the issue with which you deal. That is not my intention, nor is it my expectation. And I invite you to be watchful that this does not happen." Commission secretary pro tempore Fr. Andrew Small, O.M.I. described the relationship as tying the Dicastery's role in "the administration of justice" to the Commission's "focus on safeguarding and protection".

=== Post-merger ===
On 29 March 2023, Hans Zollner left the commission and criticised it, stating among other things: "in my work with the commission, I have noticed issues that need to be urgently addressed and which have made it impossible for me to continue further". The next day, his criticism was answered by the president of the commission, O'Malley, who stated among other things: "I am surprised, disappointed, and strongly disagree with [Zollner's] publicly-issued assertions challenging the commission's effectiveness".

On 15 March 2024, O'Malley announced that Pope Francis had appointed Luis Manuel Alí Herrera, a Colombian bishop, as secretary and Teresa Morris Kettlekamp as adjunct secretary. They are the first bishop and the first laywoman to hold those positions.

In March 2026, Pope Leo XIV appointed Susan Lynn Bissell, a Canadian expert in child protection, and Laurent Delvolvé, a French civil, criminal, and canon lawyer, to join the Commission.

== See also ==
- Vos estis lux mundi
- Ecclesiastical response to Catholic sex abuse cases
