= Catholic Church sexual abuse cases in Europe =

The Catholic sexual abuse scandal in Europe has affected several dioceses in European nations. This article summarises reported cases of sexual abuse perpetrated by clergy and representatives of the Catholic Church by country and diocese.

Italy is an exceptional case as the 1929 Lateran Treaty gave the Vatican legal autonomy from Italy, giving the clergy recourse to Vatican rather than Italian law.

It has been reported that, ever since Pope Francis was elected pope, the Vatican gradually increased its efforts to deal with clerical sexual abuse. For example, in 2019, it discontinued the application of "pontifical secrecy" to sex abuse legal proceedings; this measure affects all countries.

== Austria ==
=== Archdiocese of Vienna ===
In 1995, Cardinal Hans Hermann Groër stepped down as head of the Roman Catholic Church in Austria following accusations of sexual misconduct. In 1998, he left the country. He remained a cardinal.

==== Diocese of Sankt Pölten ====
Bishop Kurt Krenn resigned from his post in 2004 after there was a scandal concerning child pornography allegedly being downloaded by a student at the seminary. Up to 40,000 photos and an undisclosed number of films, including child pornography, were found on the computer of one of the seminarians, but Krenn earlier angered many by calling the images a "childish prank".

===== Kremsmuenster Abbey =====
In March 2010, several monks were suspended at Kremsmunster Abbey, located in the Upper Austria city of Kremsmunster, for severe allegations of sexual abuse and physical violence. The reported incidents ranged over a period from the 1970s until the late 1990s and had been subject to police investigation. In July 2013 an Austrian court found Kremsmuenster Abbey director Alfons Mandorfer guilty in 24 documented cases of child abuse and sexual violence. The now laicized priest, who was accused of committing "sexual acts of differing intensity" on the pupils between 1973 and 1993, was sentenced to twelve years in prison. By 2013, the school had paid approximately €700,000 in compensation.

== Belgium ==
Abuse affairs have affected several Belgian dioceses, which were hurt by allegations of abuse similar to those found in other Western countries. In response to this, an independent commission was established by the Belgian Episcopal Conference in 2000 under the presidency of Godelieve Halsberghe, a retired magistrate. A total of more than 300 complaints were made to the commission. The commission ultimately dealt with 33 formal complaints. 32 complaints were upheld by the commission, 1 was ruled false. Of these, only 1 case came before a court, because the facts of the other 31 cases were concerned with statutes of limitation. In about half of the 32 cases, the alleged abusers, clerics and religious, refused to appear before the commission, due to a lack of cooperation from the Belgian episcopate in forcing hierarchical obeyance to do so. The president and numerous commission members resigned from the commission as a result.

A second Independent Commission was established in 2009 under the presidency of psychiatrist Peter Adriaenssens. He resigned his commission in the aftermath of the large-scale police raid on 24 June 2010. Judicial police searched the archbishopric palace in Mechelen whilst the Belgian episcopal conference was officially meeting. Further searches were conducted at the archbishopric cathedral of Mechelen, the private residence of former archbishop Godfried Danneels in Mechelen and the offices of the independent commission in Leuven. 450 internal dossiers were confiscated.

=== Archdiocese of Mechelen-Brussels ===
- Former parish priest André Vanderlyn of Saint-Gillis parish in Brussels was arrested 20 June 1997 on charges of rape of a minor. He later confessed to seven rape cases between 1968 and 1997.
- On 18 December 2008, former parish priest Robert Borremans was sentenced to five years in prison for sexual abuse of a six-year-old boy from 1994 until 2001. His sentence was uphold in the Brussels court of appeal in April 2010. As a consequence, he will be laicised. He had previously been convicted for indecent exposure. He presided over the marriage Mass of Crown Prince Philippe of Belgium and his wife Mathilde d'Udekem d'Acoz.

==== Diocese of Antwerp ====
- 8 April 1999, former parish priest Joris Horvath was beaten to death on the street by Wim C. After a police investigation it was revealed that Wim C. had been sexually abused by the dead priest as a child. Wim C. was shot & wounded in the shoulder by the Special Forces of the police during the incident.
- Former parish priest Bruno Vos of the Onze Lieve Vrouw ten Hemel Opgenomen Nieuwmoer-parish in Kalmthout was officially charged with rape of four minors by the Belgian judiciary. There are also allegations of possession of child pornography included in the charge. The Antwerp court of appeal sentenced him to nine years imprisonment in April 2009.
- Former Sint-Filippus-parish in Schoten parish priest Jef Van den Ouweland was convicted in 2003 for the rape of three boys, who were abused since 1982.

==== Diocese of Bruges ====
- On 14 November 2005, former religious brother Luc D. of the Congregation of the Fratres Van Dale was sentenced by a Belgian court to 10 years imprisonment for sexual abuse of 20 mentally handicapped persons over a period of 16 years.
- On 14 November 2005, former religious brother Roger H. of the Congregation of the Fratres Van Dale was sentenced by a Belgian court to 10 years imprisonment for sexual abuse of mentally handicapped persons.
- In April 2010, Bishop Roger Vangheluwe resigned after admitting to the sexual abuse of a boy during his career as a priest and his early years as a bishop.
- Father Marc Vangheluwe resigned his post as deacon for the parish community of Ieper-Sint-Elooi and teacher in a school for handicapped children in May 2010 following the media backlash concerning paedophilia. He was convicted in a criminal court for the rape of a minor during the eighties, but could continue his activities as a teacher and pastoral worker.

==== Diocese of Ghent ====
- In 1881, the Brothers of our Lady of Lourdes were confronted with a first scandal. One brother was sent to jail. In the 1960s a new scandal erupted in the same institute.
- Former parish priest Leo A. of Sint-Martinus parish at Bavegem was convicted to seven years imprisonment for raping minor choir boys.

==== Diocese of Hasselt ====
On 27 November 2009, parish priest Bart Aben of Overpelt parish in Limburg was arrested by the police on accusations of rape and sexual abuse of two children, one male and one female, in his previous parish, Bocholt over a long period of time, from 1991 until 2008. He confessed his abuse to his bishop, Mgr. Patrick Hoogmartens and the police.

==== Diocese of Liège ====
On 25 September 1992, parish priest Louis Dupont of Kinkempois parish near Liège was convicted to three years imprisonment and five years in case of repetition by a Belgian court for the rape of a minor girl and boy in 1990.

==== Diocese of Namur ====
- On 25 October 2000, former parish priest André Louis of Ottré parish near Namur was sentenced to 30 years imprisonment for the rape of 26 children over a long period of time.
- Former parish priest Gilbert Hubermont of a Greater-Namur parish was convicted for sexual harassment of a 14-year-old choir boy from Aubange between 1987 and 1991. The case was reopened and Hubermont was finally convicted 5 June 2007.

==== Diocese of Tournai ====
Priest Jean-François Gysels, former parish priest in Brunehaut and Rumes and former deacon of Antoing in the diocese of Tournai, was arrested in 2006 as a result of operation Falcon, an American led worldwide investigation of internet child pornography.

=== Salesians ===
In 2007, a Belgian criminal court convicted Willem V.C., a laicised Salesian priest, to four years imprisonment for sexual delinquency with multiple adolescent minors. During the criminal investigation by the police and judiciary, previous acts of sexual delinquency were discovered that took place during his membership of the Salesian congregation. He was expelled from this order in 2001 for these incidents.

== Croatia ==
=== Archdiocese of Zagreb ===
Ivan Čuček convicted in 2000 for sexual abuse of 37 young girls, sentenced to three years in prison, but later the Croatian Supreme Court reduced the sentence to one and a half years in case he commits such crime again.

=== Archdiocese of Rijeka ===
Drago Ljubičić convicted in 2007 was a Catholic priest on the island of Rab sentenced to three years in prison for molesting five teenage boys. He was the first Catholic priest to serve prison time for sexual abuse in Croatia. Prior to the scandal, when asked by the Catholic press agency Glas Koncila on why children avoid going to church, he blamed 'strong influence of communism on the island of Rab'.

== Czech Republic ==
=== Archdiocese of Olomouc ===
In 2000 Fr. František Merta and Olomouc Archbishop Jan Graubner were charged after allegations were made by a theology student, Václav Novák, that Merta had sexually abused altar boys since 1995. Novák persuaded a group of victims to come forward with their allegations against Merta. In 2001, Merta was found guilty of sexually abusing more than 20 boys and given a suspended sentence of two years. When he was a priest in Moravia, Archbishop Jan Graubner failed to report him. Instead, Graubner moved him from location to location whenever problems appeared. A book about Merta's child sexual abuse cases, Křičí hlasem zrady (They Are Shouting the Voice of Betrayal), was published in March 2001 by Václav Novák.

== Denmark ==
=== Diocese of Copenhagen ===
In the end of April 2010 Danish Catholic Church reported pedophilia cases has risen to 17 cases.

== France ==
Abuse affairs have also affected the Church in France. On 3 June 2019, the French Catholic Church activated a sex abuse commission—made up of 22 legal professionals, doctors, historians, sociologists and theologians—which will obtain witness statements and deliver its conclusions by the end of 2020. In July 2019, the Holy See waived the diplomatic immunity of its nuncio to France Luigi Ventura, who has been under investigation for sex abuse and will likely face criminal charges in Paris. Despite an ongoing criminal investigation in Paris, it was revealed on 30 September 2019 that Ventura no longer resides in France and now lives in Rome, Italy.

On 9 November 2019, the large majority of the 120 members of the Conference of French Bishops (CEF) approved a resolution agreeing that every French Bishop will pay compensation for sex abuse committed in their Diocese. The size of the compensations was determined in April 2020. In June 2020, the Independent Commission on Sexual Abuse in the Church (CIASE), which was set up in June 2019, concluded that 3,000 children in France were sexually abused by Catholic clergy and officials since 1950 and that there was an average of 40 victims per year. On 11 November 2020, Jean-Marc Sauve, the head of the independent commission set up by the Catholic Church in France to investigate claims of sex abuse, acknowledged the commission's sex abuse hotline, which closed on 31 October 2020, received 6,500 calls reporting sex abuse in a period 17 months. On 2 March 2021 the head of a commission examining sexual abuse in France's Catholic Church put the possible number of child victims at more than 10,000.

On 23 July 2020, the Paris Prosecutor's Office announced that Ventura had been criminally charged with sexually assaulting four men in 2018 and 2019 and will stand trial in Paris starting 10 November 2020. Ventura's lawyer stated that during the trial, Ventura would return to Paris and make in-person court appearances. However, Ventura's trial began in Paris on the scheduled date without his presence. Despite Ventura's absence, which was justified by a doctor's note pointing out the dangers of traveling to France due to the country's surging number of COVID-19 cases, a motion filed by Ventura's lawyers to postpone the trial was denied and the trial proceeded with several men accusing Ventura of groping them, including a Catholic seminarian, testifying in court. On 15 November 2020, it was reported that as a result of the COVID-19 pandemic, Ventura, who remained in Rome throughout the duration of his Paris trial, "could not return to his trial". A verdict was announced on 16 December 2020, and saw Ventura convicted and handed an eight-month suspended prison sentence.

On 3 October 2021, a commission released a report stating that since the 1950s, there have been about 3,000 pedophiles among the ranks of Catholic clergy in France. The report found the estimation among more than 115,000 priests and religious officials. according to this report About 216,000 children are estimated to have been sexually abused by thousands of French Catholic priests, rising to 330,000 if abuse by lay members is included. Pope Francis said that he was shamed by the church's failure to deal with paedophile priests in France.

Archbishop Éric de Moulins-Beaufort of Reims, president of the Bishops' Conference of France, expressed "shame and horror" at the report, but later caused outrage by rejecting the commission's recommendation to require priests to inform police of any child abuse cases if the information had been given under the seal of confession, saying that the secrecy of confession was in a way above the laws of the Republic, "a free space for speaking before God". This statement was in line with 2020 Vatican guidance on clerical child abuse cases, which state that any crime discovered during confession is subject to "the strictest bond of the sacramental seal". However, Interior minister Gérald Darmanin told de Moulins-Beaufort that professional secrecy did not apply to such cases: "there is no law that is superior to the laws of the National Assembly and the Senate ... The French Republic respects all religions from the moment they respect the Republic and the laws of the Republic." De Moulins-Beaufort then issued an apology, and the Bishops Conference said that the church should review its practises given the scale of the abuse, and that work was needed "to reconcile the nature of confession with the need to protect children".

=== Archdiocese of Besançon ===
- Bruno Kieffer gave to a nine-year-old girl a gym lesson with both of them naked, showed to his class a latex thong he was wearing, and was sentenced to one year for exhibition and sexual aggression of a fifteen-year-old girl.
- Jean Luc Heckner – sentenced to 16 years in jail on charges of raping seven young boys (11-14yrs) between 1992 and 1998.

=== Archdiocese of Lyon ===
On 7 March 2019, Archbishop Cardinal Philippe Barbarin was found guilty for covering up sex abuse and was sentenced to a suspended prison sentence of six months. His co-defendants were acquitted. The highest court of France cleared Barbarin in April 2021. Bernard Preynat, the priest who Barbarin was accused of protecting, was laicized by the Holy See on 5 July 2019 after a canonical trial found him guilty of sex abuse. Despite his conviction having been overturned, Pope Francis accepted Barbarin's resignation as Archbishop of Lyon on 6 March 2020.

On 14 January 2020, Preynat, who had been convicted on another sex abuse charge in 2016, confessed during his criminal trial that he had a habit of "caressing" boy scouts he oversaw when he had served as scout chaplain in the Lyon suburb of Sainte-Foy-lès-Lyon, and that he did so in a way which brought him "sexual pleasure". On 15 January, Preynat, accused of molesting 80 Boy Scouts between 1971 and 1991, stated that the Vatican let him complete his seminary education to become a priest after he had undergone therapy at the Vinatier Psychiatric Hospital between 1967 and 1968, and that he had warned the Vatican about his sexual impulses. After Preynat's 2016 conviction for acts of abuse committed between 1986 and 1991, for which he was sentenced to 18-months' imprisonment, suspended, Barbarin was reported to have appointed Preynat to a higher position in the Archdiocese of Lyon. The 2020 sex abuse trial against Preynat, which also saw 10 of his victims take civil legal action, concluded on 17 January 2020, with judgement scheduled for 16 March. On 16 March 2020, Preynat was sentenced to five-years in prison for sexually assaulting boy scouts.

=== Archdiocese of Clermont ===
An unnamed priest was convicted by a French court in 2017 of molesting four victims while serving in the Central African Republic and was given a five-year prison sentence.

=== Archdiocese of Rouen ===
In 2018, Fr. Jean-Baptiste Sebe committed suicide after accusations surfaced that he had molested a young woman north of Rouen. The woman's mother had complained to the Archdiocese of Rouen and a criminal investigation against Sebe was under way as well.

==== Diocese of Bayeux ====
A priest of the Diocese of Bayeux, Rene Bissey, was convicted in 2000 of having molested eleven young boys. He was sentenced to 18 years in prison. His bishop, Pierre Pican, was given a suspended sentence of three months for failing to report the charges against Bissey to civil authorities.

==== Diocese of Evreux ====
65-year-old Canadian-born priest Denis Vadeboncoeur of the Roman Catholic Diocese of Évreux was sentenced to 12 years in prison for the rape of minors at the paroisse de Lieurey (Eure) between 1989 and 1992.

=== Archdiocese of Strasbourg ===
In February 2019, an unnamed 60 year-old priest was convicted by a court in Colmar for sexually assaulting four young female parishioners, one of whom was only nine years-old, and embezzling 100,000 euros ($115,000) to pay one of his victims to keep silent. He was sentenced to five years in prison and was also banned from contacting his victims and returning to the Alsace region where the offenses were carried out.

=== Archdiocese of Tours ===
==== Diocese of Orléans ====
- In 2018, the former rector of the Diocese's cathedral was arrested and charged with sex abuse.
- In November 2018, retired priest Pierre de Castelet was convicted of abusing several boys under 15 in 1993. A retired bishop of the diocese, Andre Fort, was convicted of failing to report complaints against the priest in 2010. Castelet was given a sentence of two years in prison and forced psychiatric treatment, while Fort was given an eight-month suspended sentence. Three victims were awarded 16,000 euros ($18,245) each in damages. One month before the convictions, another accused priest committed suicide.

=== Archdiocese of Paris ===
- François Lefort – sentenced to eight years in prison for the rape of six Senegalese minors.
- Pierre Dufour – sentenced to 15 years in prison for rape and sexual assault.

On 5 September 2019, Michel Aupetit, the Archbishop of Paris, and Rémy Heitz, the lead prosecutor in Paris, signed an accord agreeing to better cooperation to speed up sex abuse investigations.

==== Diocese of Meaux ====
Parish priest Henri Lebras of the Roman Catholic Diocese of Meaux was sentenced to ten years for the rape of a twelve-year-old boy between 1995 and 1998.

==== Diocese of Versailles ====
In May 2019, a priest in Versailles was charged with raping a woman and her 13-year-old daughter, who was below the legal age of consent of 15.

==== Apostolic Nuncio ====
From January 2019, Luigi Ventura, the apostolic nuncio to France, was under investigation by French authorities for sexual crimes. In July 2019, the Vatican lifted his diplomatic immunity so that he could face criminal charges. He was allowed to relocate to Rome; Pope Francis accepted his resignation in December 2019. His criminal trial started in Paris on 10 November 2020 and had been expected to be held in-person. Ventura did not fulfil his pledge to appear in person, though witnesses testified. During the trial, prosecution sought only a 10-month suspended prison sentence. A verdict was delivered on 16 December 2020; a Paris court convicted Ventura and sentenced him to eight months' imprisonment, suspended. The sentence included probation, and a required payment of €13,000 to the victims and €9,000 in legal fees.

=== Archdiocese of Montpellier ===
==== Diocese of Perpignan ====
- An unnamed former priest, who also was a former chaplain for the Scouts of Europe, was sentenced to 15 years in prison after being convicted of raping two boys between 2005 and 2009.

== Germany ==
- In February 2010, Der Spiegel reported that more than 94 clerics and laymen had been suspected of sexual abuse since 1995, but only 30 had actually been prosecuted because of legal time constraints on pursuing cases.
- On 30 March 2010, the Catholic Church set up a sexual abuse hotline in Germany, which received almost 2,700 calls on its first three days of operation.
- In July 2017, it was further reported that at least 547 members of the prestigious Domspatzen choir in Regensburg were physically abused, sexually abused, or both between 1945 and 1992.
- In September 2018, a leaked report showed that 1,670 church workers were accused of molesting 3,677 children throughout Germany between the years 1946 and 2014. More incidents were likely reported at different times, but could not be disclosed due to the lack of independent access to church files. The victims were predominantly male, and more than half of them were no older than 13. A number of the "predator priests" were relocated to other parishes to avoid scrutiny. Additional files containing more reports of sex abuse were destroyed by local dioceses. The report did not include all the Catholic Church's institutions, namely religious orders and all the schools and children's homes they run.
- In August 2020, 1,412 people in Germany accused members of Catholic religious orders of sexually abusing them as children, teenagers, and as wards. At least 654 monks, nuns and other members of the orders were accused of abuse. Around 80% of the victims were male and 20% female. The orders were among the last Catholic church organizations in Germany to address sex abuse. Although there are more women than men members of German religious orders, the majority of sex abuse accusations were against male religious order members.
- In December 2020, Catholic nuns who ran a former children's home in the German city of Speyer were implicated in transporting children to priests who then abused them sexually.
- In February 2021 it was reported that at least 61 clergymen from the Archdiocese of Berlin were involved in the sexual abuse of minors from 1946 to the end of 2019. A total of 121 victims are known, but the number of unreported cases could be much higher.

The Catholic Church in Germany had 21 million members in 2022, 24.8% of the population. In 2021, nearly 360,000 people left; in 2022, 522,821 left, far more than had been predicted. (The Protestant Church also had abuse scandals and lost members at a rate only slightly lower.) The departures are thought to be driven by the child abuse scandals and widespread cover-up. The departures led to a large decrease in church revenues, from the church tax and other sources. Canon lawyer Thomas Schüller said "The Catholic church is dying a painful death in full view of the public".

German Web site GottesSuche (God's Search) has a frequently updated sourced timeline of cases, international but focussed on Germany.

=== Archdiocese of Munich and Freising ===
The German daily newspaper the Süddeutsche Zeitung revealed details of the mishandling of the case of a pedophile priest in the archdiocese of Munich in the early 1980s when Joseph Ratzinger (later Pope Benedict XVI) was archbishop of Munich. In January 1980, Cardinal Ratzinger approved the transfer of Father Peter Hullermann, who had been accused of sexual abuse, including forcing an 11-year-old boy to perform oral sex upon him, to Munich to undergo therapy. Despite his record, Hullermann was assigned work in the area of pastoral care where he again abused minors. In June 1986 he was convicted of sexually abusing minors, fined DM4,000 and given an 18-month suspended sentence. Hullermann continued to serve as a priest in a variety of parishes in Bavaria, Germany until he was suspended on Monday 14 March 2010. In March 2010, Fr. Gerhard Gruber, who was at the time vicar general in Munich, assumed total responsibility for the decision to readmit Hullermann to pastoral care work, expressing regret and seeming to suggest that Cardinal Ratzinger had not been fully informed. According to sex abuse whistleblower Fr Tom Doyle, who was quoted in The New York Times, "Pope Benedict is a micromanager. He's the old style. Anything like that would have been brought to his attention. Tell the vicar general to find a better line. What he's trying to do, obviously, is protect the pope."

Referring both to this case and also to reports of sex abuse cases linked to the Regensburger Domspatzen choir, directed for 30 years by the pope's brother Mgr Georg Ratzinger, Holy See senior spokesman Fr Federico Lombardi argued at the weekend that the pope had been the victim of a media witch-hunt. "There have been those who have tried, with a certain aggressive persistence, in Regensburg and Munich, to look for elements to personally involve the Holy Father (i.e., the Pope) in the matter of abuses ... It is clear that these attempts have failed."

On 5 April 2020, it was revealed that the Pius youth home near Munich, which has long been run the Archdiocese of Munich, had a history of numerous reports of sex abuse and forced prostitution. An unnamed 56-year-old man who was accused sexually abusing numerous boys at the home was arraigned in court.

==== Diocese of Passau ====
In February 2018, a 53-year-old ex-priest from Deggendorf whose name and identity were kept anonymous was convicted in 108 child abuse cases and was order to be detained for a minimum period of eight and a half years in a psychiatric detention, where he could also serve a potential life sentence depending on the outcome of his therapy.

==== Diocese of Regensburg ====
Peter Kramer, parish priest of Riekofen, Bavaria, was convicted of sexual abuse of minors in 2003. He had been convicted to a jail sentence and damages for multiple abuse of a minor in 2000. Survivors Network for those Abused by Priests criticized Gerhard Ludwig Müller, later cardinal and prefect of the Congregation for the Doctrine of the Faith, for having reinstated the priest in parish work after he had been convicted in 2000 for child sexual abuse crimes. Mueller apologized for his mishandling of the case.

On 7 January 2015, German National Television (ARD) aired the documentary "Sünden an den Sängerknaben, Die Akte Regensburger Domspatzen", about sexual and physical abuse in the world-famous boys' choir, as well as the reaction of the Diocese of Regensburg to the scandal. Former members of the choir described what they had experienced as choir-boys at the hands of clergy and teachers. They added that the Diocese of Regensburg had – five years after the scandal became public – still not reacted to their appeals for recognition and compensation. The emotional interviews led to a wave of public sympathy for the victims and a controversial public discussion. The film also outlined the close connection between the Regensburger Domspatzen and the Vatican because of the two Ratzinger brothers. In a chronology published by the Diocese of Regensburg, the church confirmed that mounting public pressure as a result of the documentary led to the decision to appoint an independent investigator to conduct a thorough investigation of abuse within the two boarding schools and the choir of the "Regensburger Domspatzen". Furthermore, the chronology specified that the television documentary led to a reconsideration of three applications submitted by former choir boys. These applications, originally declined, were reconsidered and approved.

In 2016, Fritz Wallner, a former chair of the lay diocesan council in Regensburg, Germany, said in an interview with the German weekly Die Zeit that Cardinal Müller "systematically" thwarted the investigation of abuse in the "Regensburger Domspatzen" boys' choir while he served as bishop of Regensburg. The choir was run from 1964 to 1994 by Msgr. Georg Ratzinger, the brother of Pope Benedict XVI. Müller insisted that neither the church nor its bishops were responsible for abusers. In February 2012, he told the news agency dpa: "If a schoolteacher abuses a child, it is not the school nor the Ministry of Education that are to blame." Rather, he maintained, it is only the perpetrator who is to blame. In 2016, a 12-member commission was created to address the history of abuse and cover-up in the boys' choir, which critics view as a long-overdue effort by the church to address a scandal that has been most troublesome to the Vatican in the last decade because it is associated with the brother of a pope. Fritz Wallner called for the church to purge anyone linked to Gerhard Ludwig Müller, who oversaw the handling of the allegations.

In July 2017, allegations surfaced that there was "a high degree of plausibility" that at least 547 members of the diocese's prestigious Domspatzen choir were either physically abused, sexually abused, or both between the years 1945 and 1992. Current bishop Rudolf Voderholzer had already announced plans to offer victims compensation of between 5,000 and 20,000 euros ($5,730 US and $22,930) each by the end of 2017. The report faulted Georg Ratzinger "in particular for 'looking away' or for failing to intervene." The report also stated that former bishop Gerhard Ludwig Muller bears "clear responsibility for the strategic, organizational and communicative weaknesses" in the diocese's effort to investigate claims of past abuse when they surfaced.

=== Archdiocese of Berlin ===
In 2013, Rev. Michael Miller, who was arrested in 2011, pleaded guilty to possession of child pornography, obscenity, and three counts of risk of injury to a minor. He received a five-year prison sentence, followed by 20 years probation, and must register as a sex offender for the remainder of his life.

==== Canisius-Kolleg Berlin ====
In 2004 and 2005, two former students of the school told the headmaster of the school that they had been sexually abused by two of their former teachers. In December 2009 and January 2010, two other boys contacted the headmaster and reported the same about the same teachers. The headmaster decided to write a letter to all former students in which he stated that he was deeply sorry for what happened. After receiving the letter several other former students contacted the headmaster and said that they – too – had been abused.

The names of the former students who said they were sexually abused were withheld from the public, but it was revealed that many of them were notable scientists or held political or economic positions of power. It was also revealed that some of the alumni, who had been abused decided to send their children to the Canisius-Kolleg. One of the teachers said the allegations made against him were true, because he really had abused boys. The teachers might not have to answer for what they did as the deadline imposed by the statute of limitation has passed, but those abused still wanted them to apologize. Apologies and financial compensations were issued to the victims.

=== Archdiocese of Freiburg ===
==== Kolleg Sankt Blasien ====
In 2010, Padre Wolfgang S admitted to several acts of sexual abuse of minors during his years as a teacher in Sankt Blasius from 1982 to 1984. Prior to that, he had taught in another Jesuit college in Berlin (Canisius-Kolleg) where he had also molested children. The order in 2010 conceded that upon discovery, his superiors provided help for him to emigrate to South America. Other cases of sexual abuse of minors in the Jesuit order were also reported and under investigation. By 2010 all cases had apparently become time-barred.

Wolfgang S., who currently lives in South America, said that he had informed his Jesuit superiors of his dark past in 1991.

The German Society of Jesus apologized and asked the victims for forgiveness for what happened at the Canisius-Kolleg Berlin and the Kolleg St. Blasien. The Holy See supported the apology.

=== Archdiocese of Hamburg ===
==== Diocese of Hildesheim ====
A priest from Braunschweig (Brunswick in English) was arrested in 2011 on charges of sexually abusing a child several years before. The priest, identified as Andreas L., admitted during his 2012 trial to engaging in 280 counts of sexual abuse involving three boys in the previous decade.

== Ireland ==
Several priests who abused children in the United States were Irish National, notably Patrick Colleary, Anthony O'Connell and Oliver O'Grady. In August 2018, a list was published which revealed that over 1,300 Catholic clergy in Ireland had been accused of sexual abuse, with 82 of them getting convicted.

=== Diocese of Cloyne ===
In 2008, the Irish government referred two allegations of child sex abuse to the National Board for Child Protection, an independent supervisory body established by the Irish bishops. Bishop John Magee had failed to implement self-regulatory procedures agreed by the bishops of Ireland in 1996. Magee apologised to the victims after a report compiled by the Health Service Executive (HSE) found his diocese had put children at risk of harm through an "inability" to respond appropriately to abuse allegations.

=== Archdiocese of Dublin ===
Father Paul McGennis, Dublin, Ireland. He abused M Collins when as a 13-year-old she was in Our Lady's Hospital for Sick Children in 1961. Collins was later told that McGennis had admitted abusing children. However the Cardinal Archbishop of Dublin, Desmond Connell, refused "on legal advice" to supply his file on McGennis to the Irish police. McGennis was nevertheless convicted and gaoled. Collins subsequently received an apology from Cardinal Connell.

An unnamed woman going by the name of 'Irene Kelly' complains of continual physical and sexual abuse by nuns at a Dublin orphanage from the age of 6 to 11. She considers the abuse which happened during the 1960s, "cruelty beyond belief". 'Kelly' also witnessed babies being treated cruelly.

==== Diocese of Ferns ====
The Ferns Inquiry 2005 – On 22 October 2005 a government-commissioned report compiled by a former Irish Supreme Court judge delivered an indictment of the handling of clerical sex abuse in the Roman Catholic Diocese of Ferns. The report revealed over one hundred cases of child sex abuse in the diocese, involving a number of clergymen, including Monsignor Micheál Ledwidth, the former head of the National Catholic seminary, Maynooth College.

=== Archdiocese of Tuam ===
Fr. Joseph Summerville plead guilty in 1996 to four of the 15 charges against him. He admitted indecently assaulting an adolescent boy during the years 1988 and 1989, while he was a boarding school chaplain at St. Jarlath's College, Tuam and was given a four-year prison sentence. A judge later imposed an additional one-year sentence after learning the details of his grooming another victim, a 15-year-old boy, in a parochial house.

==== Galway, Kilmacduagh and Kilfenora diocese ====
An eight-year (1999–2007) enquiry and report by Doctor Elizabeth Healy and Doctor Kevin McCoy into the Brothers of Charity Congregation's "Holy Family School" in Galway, the major city of the archdiocese, and two other locations was made public in December 2007. 11 brothers and 7 other staff members were alleged to have abused 121 intellectually disabled children in residential care in the period 1965–1998.

== Italy ==
- The 1929 Lateran Treaty between the Italian government and the Vatican gave the Vatican legal autonomy from Italy, giving the clergy recourse to Vatican law over that of Italy, in effect potentially shielding them from Italian justice, although secular authorities are increasingly acting against clerical sexual abusers, as the cases below demonstrate. In May 2012 the Italian Bishops' Conference (CEI) said in its child protection guidelines that under Articles 2.1 and 4.4 of the concordat of the Lateran Treaty its priests have no obligation to report suspected abuse to the police. A culture of complicity and denial conceals the true scale of clerical sex abuse in Italy—there are no official statistics—the country's one victims' rights group Rete l'Abuso (The Abuse Network) compiles what it can. The group ascertained in October 2018 that the Italian criminal justice system had dealt with about 300 cases of predator priests and nuns, with 150 to 170 convictions since the year 2000.
- The Italian lawyer Sergio Cavaliere, advocate for victims, said in April 2010 that there had been a cover-up of clerical abuse in Italy and that 130 legal cases brought against priests for abuse in the previous ten years had been reported in the press.
- Prior to 2001, all cases were handled privately within dioceses. In 2001 Cardinal (later Pope) Joseph Ratzinger sent a letter to all bishops ordering all sex abuse cases be transferred to the Vatican. He imposed total secrecy on the proceedings, with the penalty of excommunication for any violations.
- In May 2007, the British Panorama documentary Sex Crimes and the Vatican was allowed to run on the state-run television station only with equal time for church officials.
- In February 2018, former Roman Rota judge Msgr. Pietro Amenta pleaded guilty to possession of child pornography and sexual molestation of an adult and was sentenced to a conditional suspended 14-month prison sentence. Armenta had been detained by police in March 2017, and resigned from the Roman Rota a week before his sentence.
- When complaints are made to the Italian civil authorities, often long after the events due to the years it can take for survivors to mentally process the crime, Italy's cumbersome legal system, and a statute of limitations which begins when a crime is committed rather than reported, usually make it too late for any action to be taken, although this system was being reformed as of 2022.

In Italy as of late 2021 the issue of Catholic sexual abuse had been largely buried. Following an investigation which found thousands of perpetrators and hundreds of thousands of victims in France, there were calls for the church to "find the courage to investigate" clerical child abuse in other countries, including specifically Italy. Hans Zollner, a German priest and adviser to Pope Francis, said "The Catholic church in other countries must now find the same courage as in France. I hope in Italy too. The church is not immaculate, unfortunately it is also made up of sin and crimes."

The Italian Bishops' Conference established Italy's first national day of prayer for survivors of abuse on 18 November 2021.

=== Roman Catholic Archdiocese of Milan ===
In 2014, Fr. Mauro Galli was convicted and sentenced to 6 years and 4 months in prison. In October 2018, charges that Milan Archbishop Mario Enrico Delpini covered up for Galli while he served as an auxiliary bishop of Milan and the vicar general, effectively the number two official at the time under Cardinal Angelo Scola.

=== Roman Catholic Archdiocese of Modena-Nonantola ===
==== Diocese of Piacenza-Bobbio ====
In August 2019, Father Stefano Segalini, a well-known former priest from Northern Italy's Diocese of Piacenza-Bobbio, was placed under house arrest after being charged with drugging adult members of his parish and then sexually abusing them afterwards.

=== Roman Catholic Archdiocese of Naples ===
In December 2019, a priest from the Don Orione Congregation in Ercolano, near Naples, and identified as Roberto Gerolamo Filippini was arrested for allegedly violently sexually abusing a disabled woman he was charged with administrating support to while he was vice director of the institution, which works for the rehabilitation of seriously disabled people.

==== Diocese of Aversa ====
In November 2019, Father Michele Mottola, 59, was arrested in Trentola Ducenta, near Naples, after audio recordings said to be of him molesting a girl were given to local press. His victim, an unnamed 11-year-old girl, record the abuse with her phone.

=== Archdiocese of Trento ===
==== Diocese of Bolzano-Brixen ====
In 2008, an Italian priest was condemned by an Italian court of appeal to seven and a half years in prison for the sexual abuse of a nine-year-old child. The abuse took place during a church organized summer camp. Damages in the amount of €700,000 were also levied.

=== Diocese of Massa Carrara - Pontremoli ===
In February 2018, Fr. Luca Morini, also known as "Don Euro", was charged with running a hush money network which protected 60 priests who had homosexual relationships, including with seminarians.

=== Archdiocese of Palermo ===
In October 2016, exorcist priest Salvatore Anello and a soldier in the Italian Army named Salvatore Muratore were arrested for sexually abusing mentally disturbed women and girls under the guise of exorcism. Anello was accused of sexually abusing two women and three girls while Muratore, who collaborated with Anello to carry out the exorcisms, was accused of sexually abusing four women and one girl. Muratore agreed to cooperation with authorities in the investigation against Anello. Anello was convicted and sentenced to 6 years and 10 months in prison in May 2019.

==== Diocese of Trapani ====
In June 2014, Sergio Librizzi, the regional director for Caritas Internationalis in Trapani, was arrested at the vicarage as he was preparing for mass and charged with forcing immigrants to have sex with him in exchange for granting them asylum He was convicted of bribery and given a nine-year prison, which was later overturned in December 2017. Despite the fact that a lower court overturned his convictions, Librizzi was ordered to remain at home until a final appeal was determined. In October 2019, it was reported that Librizzi's nine prison sentence was now "confirmed".

=== Archdiocese of Catania ===
==== Diocese of Acireale ====
In April 2019, Acireale Bishop Antonio Raspanti was called to testify about "the behavior of the church of Acireale" towards the Catholic Culture and Environment Association (ACCA). Former ACCA leader Piero Alfio Capuana, who stationed his group's headquarters in Acireale, was jailed in 2017 on charges of sexually abusing 10 underage girls whose ages ranged between 11 and 16. By November 2019, three co-defendants-Katia Concetta Scarpignato, Fabiola Raciti and Rosaria Giuffrida- were put on trial with Capuana. On 18 September 2020, Capuana's sex abuse trial officially began.

=== Archdiocese of Reggio Calabria-Bova ===
On 18 December 2015 Reggio Calabria police arrested a 44-year-old priest on charges of paying 20 euros for sex with a minor, misrepresenting his identity, luring a minor, and possession of child pornography. The minor told police he first contacted the priest on gay social network smartphone app Grindr, and said the priest used an assumed name and told him he was a scientific researcher aged between 35 and 38. He was arrested in the rectory of a parish church in the Piana di Gioia Tauro valley and taken to jail. The unnamed priest had earlier been arrested in March 2015 when police caught him in his car with another minor in a secluded and rarely frequented area.

=== Archdiocese of Venice ===
==== Diocese of Padua ====
On 3 March 2018, Father Andrea Contin was laicized by the Holy See, and began serving a one-year prison sentence after pleading guilty to sexually abusing a woman in 2016.

==== Diocese of Verona ====
Three former students have claimed abuse and 65 former students signed statements saying that they or other students were abused by Catholic priests when attending the Antonio Provolo Institute for the Deaf, a Catholic school for deaf children in Verona, Italy. The abuse is alleged to have occurred from the 1950s to 1980s, and was reportedly conducted by 24 priests including the late bishop of Verona. One priest who was transferred to Argentina, Fr Nicola Corradi, was first accused of committing sex abuse at the Institute in 2009. Flagged by the Diocese of Verona in 2011, Corradi was later arrested in Mendoza, Argentina in 2016 for acts of sex abuse he reportedly committed in Argentina as well, and started trial in Argentina on 5 August 2019. School gardener Armando Gómez was also convicted and jailed for 18 years, while Japanese nun Sr. Kosako Kumiko, who was arrested in May 2017 on charges of covering up the acts of sex abuse, was still being held in prison awaiting trial.

=== Diocese of Prato ===
In September 2021, a priest in the Diocese of Prato (a suffragan of the Archdiocese of Florence), Francesco Spagnesi, was arrested for stealing "church funds and donations to buy drugs for gay sex parties that he hosted". While abuse of minors by him has not been alleged, as of September 2021, he has been accused of spreading AIDS by not telling sex partners he was HIV positive.

=== Historical ===
Martin Luther, who had spent time in Rome said that Pope Leo X had vetoed a measure that cardinals should restrict the number of boys they kept for their pleasure, "otherwise it would have been spread throughout the world how openly and shamelessly the pope and the cardinals in Rome practice sodomy"; encouraging Germans not to spend time fighting fellow countrymen in defense of the papacy.

Luther's accusations were disputed. In fact, in 1514 Leo X had issued the Bull Supernae dispositionis arbitrio which, inter alia, required cardinals to live "... soberly, chastely, and piously, abstaining not only from evil but also from every appearance of evil" and a contemporary and eyewitness at Leo's Court (Matteo Herculaneo), emphasized his belief that Leo was chaste all his life.

== Malta ==
84 allegations of child abuse have been made to the church from 1999 to 2010.

=== Archdiocese of Malta ===
Father Anthony Mercieca, who was accused by former Florida Congressman Mark Foley of molesting him as a teenager, now lives in Malta.

== Monaco ==
On 3 December 2020, William McCandless, a member of the Wilmington, Delaware-based religious order Oblates de St. Francis De Sales who was formerly assigned to DeSales University in Lehigh County, Pennsylvania, was charged in Philadelphia, Pennsylvania for possession of child pornography. He also served as an adviser to Monaco’s royal family, Grace Kelly, the late mother of Monaco's leader Prince Albert, was also a native of Philadelphia. Much of McCandless' child pornography was imported from overseas as well. McCandless has been ordered to remain under house arrest until the outcome of his trial.

== Netherlands ==
The abuse scandal in the Netherlands has affected several Dutch dioceses.

In 2012, press reports indicated that in the 1950s, officials in the Dutch Church took retribution against ten children who reported sexual abuse by having them surgically castrated. Due to the passage of time and loss of records, only one victim could be identified by name.

Cases of sexual abuse by religious members of the Roman Catholic Church in the Netherlands can since 1995 be notified to a central Church institution, called Secretariaat Rooms-Katholiek Kerkgenootschap (SRRK).

In 2011 the Deetman Commission, acting on the 2010 request of the Dutch Episcopal Conference and the Dutch Religious Conference, reported on its inquiry into abuse cases from 1945 to 2010 affecting children entrusted to the care of the church in the Netherlands.

=== Archdiocese of Utrecht ===
==== Diocese of Den Bosch ====
Father J. Ceelen, pastor of the parishes of Lieshout and of Mariahout (municipality of Laarbeek) quits his post after allegations of sexual abuse on 1 September 2005.

==== Diocese of Rotterdam ====
- On 14 May 1998, damages of €56,800 were paid by the diocese of Rotterdam to the victim of sexual abuse by a diocesan priest in order to avoid civil prosecution.
- From 2008 until 2010, an Irish priest named Oliver O'Grady sexually abused more than 20 boys and girls, at the Heilig Hartkerk of the Christus onze Verlosser-parish in Rotterdam. He used the pseudonym of Brother Francis and was recognised as the previously convicted child molester O'Grady by parishioners after seeing the Oscar-nominated television documentary Deliver Us from Evil.

=== Salesians ===
In February 2010, the Salesians were accused of sexual abuse in their juvenate Don Rua in 's-Heerenberg. Salesian bishop of Rotterdam van Luyn pleaded for a thorough investigation.

== Norway ==
=== Territorial Prelature of Trondheim ===
Georg Müller SS.CC., a former Catholic Bishop of the Roman Catholic Territorial Prelature of Trondheim in Trondheim, Norway, has admitted to sexually abusing an altar boy in the 1980s when he served as a priest there. Müller, who retired as bishop in 2009, said there were no other victims.

As of April 2010, Norway's Catholic church had reported 18 pedophilia cases.

== Poland ==
During 2013, reports of a succession of child sex abuse scandals within the church, some of which reached the courts, and the poor response by the church, became a matter of public concern. Responding to criticism of the church President of the Polish Episcopal Conference, Archbishop Jozef Michalik, said "Often that inappropriate approach or abuse is released when the child is looking for love. It clings, it seeks. It loses itself and also draws in that second person." This comment was heavily criticised, and Michalik apologised for it. The church resisted demands to pay compensation to victims.

On 27 September 2018, however, Bishop Romuald Kamiński of the Diocese of Warsaw-Praga stated that Polish church leaders were working on a document, to be published later, on priestly sexual abuse of minors in Poland, and ways to prevent it. Cases were being evaluated by Warsaw courts, and the priests involved were banned from working with minors; three were suspended from all pastoral work. According to Archbishop Wojciech Polak, who serves as the head of Poland's Catholic Church, the document will include data on the scale of priestly sex abuse in Poland.

On 8 October 2018, a victims group mapped out 255 cases of alleged sex abuse in Poland.

Statistics were released on 14 April 2019, commissioned by the Episcopal Conference of Poland and with data from over 10,000 local parishes. It was found that from 1990 to mid-2018, abuse reports about 382 priests were made to the Church, with 625 children, mostly under 16, sexually abused by members of the Catholic clergy. There were opinions that the figures underestimated the extent of the problem, and failed to answer questions church officials had avoided for years. Marek Lisinski, the co-founder of Don't Be Afraid, which represents victims of clerical abuse, said "Tell us how [the priests] hurt those children and how many times they were transferred to different parishes before you paid notice". The data were released a few weeks after Pope Francis had called for "an all-out battle against the abuse of minors". After pressure from the Pope, in the preceding years Poland's church had publicly apologized to abuse victims, and accepted the need to report those accused of such crimes. In earlier times clergy to whom sexual abuse of minors was reported were not required by their superiors to notify the police, but to investigate themselves, and if necessary inform the Vatican.

On 11 May 2019, Polak issued an apology on behalf of the entire Catholic Church in Poland. The same day, Tell No One, a documentary detailing accounts of sex abuse by Catholic church workers in Poland, went viral, obtaining 8.1 million viewers on YouTube by 13 May. Among other things, the film alleges that Rev. Dariusz Olejniczak, a priest who was sentenced for molesting seven-year-old girls, was allowed to continue working with young people despite his conviction. The film also accused former Polish leader Lech Wałęsa's personal priest Franciszek Cybula, who is now deceased, of sexual abuse and noted that he transferred between parishes. On 14 May 2019, Poland's ruling Law and Justice (PiS) party, which has long had an alliance with the nation's Catholic Bishops, agreed to increase penalties for child sex abuse by raising the maximum prison sentence from 12 years to 30 years and raising the age of consent from 15 to 16. Prosecutor and PiS lawmaker Stanislaw Piotrowicz, who heads the Polish Parliament's Justice Commission, has also been criticized for playing down the actions of a priest who was convicted for inappropriately touching and kissing young girls.

On 16 May 2020, Polak asked the Vatican to investigate sex abuse claims involving brothers Marek and Tomasz Sekielski. The two brothers released a popular YouTube documentary titled Hide and Seek, which detailed their allegations that they were molested by a Polish Catholic priest. Polak expressed support the allegations, stating "The film... shows that protection standards for children and adolescents in the Church were not respected."

=== Archdiocese of Kraków ===
==== Diocese of Kielce ====
In Tell No One, a priest known as Father Jan A., who served the Diocese of Kielce in the village of Topola, confessed to molesting many young girls. Claims made against Father Jan A. were previously investigated by the diocese and evidence collected during the investigation was sent to the Vatican in May 2019.

=== Archdiocese of Poznań ===
In March 2002, Archbishop Juliusz Paetz quit following accusations, which he denied, of sexually molesting young priests.

==== Diocese of Kalisz ====
On 25 June 2020, Pope Francis ordered bishop Edward Janiak, age 67, to resign from his duties as bishop of the Roman Catholic Diocese of Kalisz for protecting priests who committed acts of sex abuse. He appointed Archbishop Grzegorz Ryś of Łódź as apostolic administrator sede plena, which means he has full administrative authority. On 17 October 2020, Pope Francis accepted Janiak's resignation from the diocese.

=== Archdiocese of Warsaw ===
==== Diocese of Warsaw-Praga ====
On 27 September 2018, Warsaw-Praga Bishop Romuald Kamiński apologized to those who had been victims of sexual abuse in his Diocese.

==== Diocese of Plock ====
In early 2007, allegations surfaced that former archbishop Stanislaw Wielgus was aware that several priests in his former diocese of Plock were sexually abusing minors.

=== Archdiocese of Gdańsk ===
In 2019, three protestors toppled a statue of Rev. Henryk Jankowski following revelations that he raped Barbara Borowiecka when she was a girl. Jankowski, who also had a criminal investigation involving the sexual abuse of a boy dropped against him in 2004, had been defrocked in 2005. However, he died in 2010 without ever being convicted of sex abuse. It has also been acknowledged that Lech Wałęsa's personal chaplain Rev. Franciszek Cybula had been accused of committing acts of sex abuse while serving in the as well. On 13 August 2020, Pope Francis removed Gdansk Archbishop Slawoj Leszek Glodz, who was among those who covered up abuse committed by Jankowski and Cybula. Glodz had also presided over Cybula's funeral Despite the fact that Glodz turned 75, the required age for Catholic Bishops to offer their resignation, the move was described as "cleaning house", as it is highly unusual for the pope to accept such a resignation on a prelate's actual birthday.

=== Archdiocese of Wrocław ===
On 6 November 2020, The Holy See's nuncio to Poland announced that following an investigation by the Holy See regarding sex abuse allegations, Cardinal Henryk Gulbinowicz. was now "barred from any kind of celebration or public meeting and from using his episcopal insignia, and is deprived of the right to a cathedral funeral and burial." Gulbinowicz was also ordered to pay an "appropriate sum" to his alleged victims. Gulbinowicz is the former archbishop of Wroch, whose support of the trade union Solidarity played a critical role in the collapse of communism in Poland. On 16 November 2020, 10 days after the Vatican, Gulbinowicz died, but, as a result of the Vatican displinary action, could not have a funeral in Wroclaw's Cathedral of St. John the Baptist or to be buried in the cathedral, and was instead cremated and buried in his family's tomb.

== Slovenia ==
=== Archdiocese of Ljubljana ===
Franc Frantar was detained in 2006 for sexual abuse of up to 16 minors. He was later sentenced to three and a half years in prison. He initially escaped persecution by escaping to Malawi to work there as a missionary, but returned to Slovenia after an Interpol warrant was issued.

== Spain ==
- In Christmas of 2007, the Bishop of Tenerife, Bernardo Álvarez, caused an uproar in Spain by making statements that appeared to equate child molestation with homosexuality and blamed the victims of abuse. One such statement was "There are 13 year old adolescents who are under age and who are perfectly in agreement with, and what's more wanting it, and if you are careless they will even provoke you."
- In February 2019, Spain's Justice Ministry questioned the credibility of Catholic Church's cooperation in the sex abuse investigations. At this point, only a handful of sex abuse victims have publicly come forward. The same month, a Netflix documentary detailed more sex abuse allegations against the Catholic Church in Spain.

=== Marist Brothers ===
By March 2016, a total of 29 complaints were made against six former teachers from three Marist schools in Barcelona, with three of these teachers confessing to committing the alleged sex abuse. By February 2019, the number of complaints against Barcelona Marist school teachers had increased to 43, with 12 teachers now named as suspected sex abusers. By this point, however, two Barcelona Marist Brothers were criminal charged, with one being convicted and another still awaiting trial. In March 2019, the trial began for the other charged Marist Brother who had yet to receive a verdict.

=== Archdiocese of Mérida-Badajoz ===
In April 2019, the Supreme Court of Spain upheld the conviction of Catholic priest Jose Fernandez, who sexually abused two 12-year-old boys in Badajoz, and confirmed a lower court's sentence of 17 years and seven months in prison. The Romanian parents of one of the two victims, an altar boy, had also previously been convicted for letting Hernandez abuse their son.two 12-year-old boys The convictions of altar's boys parents, and their four-year sentences, were upheld as well.

=== Archdiocese of Granada ===
Between November 2014 and January 2015, 10 Catholic priests and two Catholic workers who served in the Roman Catholic Archdiocese of Granada were arrested and charged with sexually molesting four altar teenage boys, but were later released on bail. In February 2015, details from the court report were released which revealed how witnesses described that the main defendant, identified as Father Roman Martínez, turned the hilltop villa he owned, and where the alleged abuse took place, into a "party zone" and urged at least one alleged altar boy victim identified as David Ramírez Castillo, who was also one of Martínez's catechism students, to visit Martínez and the other priests there in order to "deepen his faith". Martínez and all of his co-defendants were suspended from active duties after being charged.

=== Diocese of Cartagena ===
On 18 May 2020, José Manuel Lorca Planes, who serves as Bishop of the Roman Catholic Diocese of Cartagena, announced the start of an "important inquiry" into sex abuse allegations spanning from 1950 to 2010. At least eight potential victims have publicly come forward, and Lorca urged more accusers to publicly come forward as well.

== United Kingdom ==
There have been Catholic Church sexual abuse cases in several dioceses across the United Kingdom.

=== England ===
Between 2001 and 2014, 52 Catholic clergy were laicized throughout England and Wales. In 2020, the Independent Inquiry into Child Sexual Abuse released a report which stated that the Catholic Church of England and Wales "swept under the carpet" allegations of sex abuse and numerous Catholic clergy in England and Wales. According to the report, Vincent Nichols, now a cardinal and the senior Catholic cleric in England and Wales, "There was no acknowledgement of any personal responsibility". The report also accused Nichols of protecting the reputation of the Church rather than protecting victims and lacked compassion towards victims.

==== Archdiocese of Birmingham ====
Father Alexander Bede Walsh was sentenced to 22 years in prison in March 2012 for serious child sex offences against boys. Walsh used religion to control his young victims, telling one boy that drinking alcohol would get him to heaven, and another believed that the abuse was the hand of God touching him, for example. One young victim was driven to a suicide attempt. Walsh had a previous conviction for computer indecency.

James Robinson worked in parishes in the English Midlands and when an accusation of child abuse happened in the 1980s, the Roman Catholic Church allowed him to escape to the United States though they knew about an "unwholesome relationship" the priest had with a boy. Robinson remained free for over 20 years till in the first decade of the 21st century he was extradited back to the UK to face charges. Robinson has received a 21-year prison sentence for multiple child sex offences. The Roman Catholic Church paid Robinson up to £800 per month despite knowing the allegations against him.

There are widespread accusations of physical abuse, emotional abuse and sexual abuse of unprotected children at Father Hudson Home, Coleshill, Warwickshire. There are even allegations that vulnerable children disappeared inexplicably. According to reports, priests and nuns were the perpetrators.

===== Diocese of Shrewsbury =====
In December 2012, staff at the Christian Brothers school St Ambrose College, Altrincham, were implicated in a child sex abuse case involving teaching staff carrying out alleged acts of abuse both on and off school grounds, although no current staff are said to be involved. More than fifty former pupils contacted police, either as victims of, or witnesses to, sexual abuse. The alleged sexual abuse, including molestation of children while corporal punishment was administered, stemmed from 1962 onwards and continued over four decades. Alan Morris, a Catholic deacon who also once served not only as a teacher at St. Ambrose, but also as the school's deputy head, was convicted in 2014 of 19 counts of sexual abuse he committed between 1972 and 1990 and was given a nine-year prison sentence. An overall total of 47 indictments were issued, with at least 27 made public since Morris was convicted.

==== Archdiocese of Liverpool ====
In December 2018, former Liverpool priest Francis William Simpson was convicted of sexually abusing four boys in front of their parents, one as young as seven. In February 2019, Simpson was given a sentence of two years and two months in prison.

===== Diocese of Leeds =====
On 1 December 2020, Diocese of Leeds priest Fr. Patrick Smythe faced four counts of indecent assault on four boys aged under 16 while he was serving the Catholic church in Leeds and Skipton between the years 1979 and 1983. Symthe was investigated by West Yorkshire Police for these allegations. He was set to make his first appearance at the Leeds Magistrates' Court on 16 December 2020. In April 2022 he was convicted of sexually assaulting six boys and jailed for 7.5 years.

==== Archdiocese of Southwark ====
- In 2000, Father James Murphy of Glounthaune was sentenced to 30 months in prison after being convicted of sexually abusing altar boys in a London parish where he served 20 years prior.
- In 2002, Michael Hill, the former secretary to the Archdiocese of Southwark's Catholic Children Society who was previously convicted for sex abuse, received his second prison sentence for abuse he committed while serving in the Archdiocese of Southwark.
- In 2003, David Murphy, a former Edinburgh priest turned charity worker, was convicted of sex abusing various boys and girls at St Mary's Home in Gravesend, Kent.
- In 2015, Father Andrew McSweeney, who had also good ties to some local celebrities and even married Frank Bruno to his now ex-wife Laura, was sentenced to three years in prison for sexually abusing a 15-year-old boy and three counts of making indecent images of children.

===== Diocese of Arundel and Brighton =====
In July 2000, the head of the Roman Catholic Church in England and Wales, Archbishop Cormac Murphy-O'Connor (later a cardinal), acknowledged he had made a mistake while he was Bishop of Arundel and Brighton in the 1980s by allowing a paedophile to carry on working as a priest. The priest at the centre of the controversy, Father Michael Hill, was jailed in 1997 for abusing nine boys over a 20-year period.

===== Diocese of Plymouth =====
In 2007, former monks William Manahan OSB, the Father Prior of Buckfast Abbey Preparatory School, and Paul Couch were convicted of molesting boys in the school during the 1970s.

==== Benedictines ====
===== Belmont Abbey =====
In 2004, former priest John Kinsey of Belmont Abbey, Herefordshire, was sentenced at Worcester Crown Court for five years for sexual assaults on schoolboys in the mid-1980s.

===== Kiltegan Fathers =====
Jeremiah McGrath of the Kiltegan Fathers was convicted in Liverpool in May 2007 for facilitating abuse by Billy Adams. McGrath had given Adams £20,000 in 2005 and Adams had used the money to impress a 12-year-old who he then raped over a six-month period. McGrath denied knowing about the abuse but admitted having a brief sexual relationship with Adams. His appeal in January 2008 was dismissed.

===== Diocese of Middlesbrough =====
James Carragher, principal of the former St. William's residential school, Market Weighton owned by the Diocese of Middlesbrough, was jailed for 14 years in 2004 for abusing boys in his care over a 20-year period. The principal and the chaplain (Anthony McCallen) at the school were both given prison sentences in 2016. The sentencing judge said:

The victims were effectively trapped and there was no escape from you. They were confused, frightened and in turmoil. It has blighted their lives and each of you had contributed significantly to their misery. [Victims endured] severe long-term, continuing psychological harm as a result of what you did

Over 200 former pupils at St William's say they were abused there. Many former pupils are suing for compensation. The school catered for boys with emotional and behavioural problems.

===== Ealing Abbey, St Benedict's School =====
In 2009, Dom David Pearce, a monk of Ealing Abbey and former headmaster of the junior department of its associated school, St Benedict's, was sentenced to eight years in prison for sexually abusing boys. In April 2006, civil damages were awarded jointly against Pearce in relation to an alleged assault by Pearce on a pupil while teaching at the school in the 1990s, although criminal charges were dropped.

In October 2017, Andrew Soper (known as Father Laurence), former abbot of Ealing Abbey, was found guilty on 19 sexual offences against pupils of St Benedict's school in the 1970s and 1980s.

===== Downside School =====
In 2004, a Benedictine monk was jailed for 18 months after taking indecent images of schoolboys and possessing child pornography when he was a teacher at Downside School. In January 2012, Father Richard White, a monk who formerly taught at the school, was jailed for five years for gross indecency and indecent assault against a pupil in the late 1980s. White, 66, who was known to pupils as Father Nick, had been allowed to continue teaching after he was first caught abusing a child in 1987 and was able to go on to groom and assault another pupil in the junior school. He was placed on a restricted ministry after the second incident, but was not arrested until 2010. Two other Downside monks, also former teachers, received police cautions during an 18-month criminal trial.

In May 2020, it was revealed that a 2018 Independent Inquiry into Child Sexual Abuse (IICSA) report regarding child sex abuse at Downside School later resulted major financial problems for the school due to spiralling legal costs. In order to raise money, Downside was forced to sell some of its Renaissance-era paintings.

==== Case of Francis McDermott ====
In March 2019, Father Francis McDermott was sentenced to 9 1/2 years in prison for molesting six children in London, Norwich and High Wycombe between 1971 and 1978.

=== Scotland ===
Child sex abuse has affected many different Scottish diocese and the credibility of the Church has been damaged. Some Catholics lost faith due to the scandal.

One notable case was an unnamed woman many times locked in a darkened room by a sexually abusive nun who was her carer. Aged 8 she told a priest about the abuse during Confessions. After that the priest and the nun raped her together. There are allegations that at Fort Augustus Abbey there were physical beating, verbal humiliation and sexual abuse. Carlkemp prep school, a feeder school preparing younger pupils for Fort Augustus is also implicated. The Guardian and the BBC both reported complaints that the Scottish Church hierarchy did not cooperate fully over investigations of child sex abuse. Alan Draper of Dundee University accused the Scottish Catholic Church of reluctance to expose priests leading double lives including those accused of sex abuse. Draper revealed bishops knew of 20 cases from 1985 to 1995 but refused to bring in experts. Draper wants relevant files given to a judicial enquiry. Public offers of support from the Church for abuse victims are met with private lack of support and an adversarial attitude when legal action is involved. Draper alleges this contrasts with protection, therapy and financial help traditionally provided for abusers. Draper commented, "The latest statement makes no mention of assessing what support has been provided to survivors. It is window dressing yet again. They have learned nothing."

Victims describe The McLellan Report into child sex abuse as a whitewash. The McLellan Report fails to state which bishops and priests were responsible over decades of child sex abuse and in Scotland, which members of the hierarchy knew about abuse without acting, and ordered victims not to be supported. Some guilty priests will be given the job of introducing safeguards in their parishes while it is feared denial and corruption will continue in the Church. Flaws in the procedures for addressing sexual abuse highlighted in the report include different rules and standards in different dioceses and lack of central guidance on sanctions, abuse victims being left out when central policies were drafted and disregarding United Nations definitions of abuse. There was a culture of cover-up where words were not met with actions. However, it has been acknowledged in at least one case that former Diocese of Galloway Bishop Maurice Taylor had received a confession of abuse from local Ayrshire priest Paul Moore in 1996 and choose to send Moore to a treatment centre in Toronto and to Fort Augustus Abbey in the Highlands instead of turning him into the authorities.

==== Archdiocese of St Andrews and Edinburgh ====
Complaints were made that Cardinal Keith O'Brien was guilty of predatory sexual acts against various junior clerics. O'Brien admitted unspecified sexual misconduct.

At the time of his arrest, David Murphy was also living in Edinburgh.

==== Diocese of Galloway ====
In 1998, former teacher at St. Columba's College, Largs, Norman Bulloch (Brother Norman) made a successful not-guilty plea with respect to the abuse of a pupil at the school between September 1971 and June 1972. Despite the not-guilty plea regarding the St Columba's abuse, Bulloch was jailed for eight years for the sexual assault of two boys at St Joseph's, Dumfries between 1972 and 1976.

In 2014 the Marist Brothers offered a former full-board pupil of St. Columba's College, Largs compensation following allegations that David Germanus (Brother Germanus) had sexually and physically abused him between 1962 and 1964 when he was aged between 7 and 9. This offer was turned down and the case went to the Court of Session. Judge Lady Wolffe ruled that the case be time-barred due to a "long negative prescription". In January 2017, Lord Justice Clerk Lady Dorrian dismissed an appeal in the case.

In June 2017, the Marist Brothers admitted to systemic failures to protect pupils from sexual abuse at the Scottish Child Abuse Inquiry.

In February 2018, former teacher at St. Columba's, Peter Toner (Brother Peter) was convicted of sexual and physical abuse of six pupils between 1980 and 1982 when the pupils were aged between 8 and 11. This prompted calls from his victims for a wider review of possible abuse he may have carried out elsewhere. Toner was jailed for 10 years for the St Columba's offences in March 2019 with the judge stating, "Your predatory sex offending was a dreadful breach of trust. You wrecked the lives of these young boys. You present a danger of causing serious sexual harm to children". At the time of sentencing Toner was already behind bars for attacking two boys at a different school.

In September 2018 St. Columba's College, Largs and St Joseph's College, Dumfries was announced as being added to the Scottish Child Abuse Inquiry's investigations with particular focus given to the schools in phase 4 of the investigation when hearings looked at residential child care establishments run by male religious orders. In October 2019 the Inquiry heard that one pupil experienced physical and sexual abuse from David Germanus and sexual abuse from an unnamed member of teaching staff between 1958 and 1962 when the pupil was aged between 8 and 12.

In 2018, Fr. Paul Moore was convicted of sexually abusing three children between 1977 and 1981 and a student priest in 1995.

==== Archdiocese of Glasgow ====
In July 2015, the Archdiocese of Glasgow issued an apology for the victims of Fr. Colman Mcgrath, who was convicted of sexually abusing a boy at his parish in Langside, Glasgow.

On 6 May 2021, Fr. John Sweeney was cleared of false allegations made against him.

In December 2018, it was announced that the Archdiocese of Glasgow was being sued by a former altar boy who stated that Fr. John Gowens, who died in 1999, repeatedly sexually abused him over a two-year period in the 1970s at the St, Patrick's church in Dumbarton.

In June 2020, Fr. Neil McGarrity, who long led St. Thomas Parish in Riddrie, Glasgow, was arrested on numerous sex abuse charges.

==== Diocese of Motherwell ====
In 2016, Fr. John Farrell, Retired priest of the Diocese of Motherwell, the last head teacher at St Ninian's Orphanage, Falkland, Fife, was sentenced to five years imprisonment. His colleague Paul Kelly, a retired teacher from Portsmouth, was given ten years, both were convicted of the physical and sexual abuse of boys between the years 1979 and 1983. More than 100 charges involving 35 boys were made. Farrell and Kelly were members of the Irish Christian Brothers when the crimes were committed at the orphanage which closed in 1983. According to The Times, it is believed this was the largest historical abuse case ever tried in Scotland.

==== Diocese of Aberdeen ====
In addition to his Glasgow conviction, Fr. Colman McGrath was convicted for sexually abusing two boys who were training to join the priesthood at Blairs College in Aberdeen. His crimes in Glasgow and Abedeen occurred between 1972 and 1982. For all of these convictions, McGrath received a sentence of 200 hours of unpaid community service, three years of supervised release, and will be placed on the sex offenders' register throughout the remainder of this life.

===== Fort Augustus Abbey =====
In 2013 The Observer newspaper reported that Scottish police were investigating allegations that pupils had been subject to physical and sexual abuse while at the abbey school. A BBC Scotland Investigates programme, entitled Sins of Our Fathers, reported allegations that Fort Augustus Abbey was used as a "dumping ground" for clergy previously accused of abuse elsewhere. Some 50 former pupils spoke of their experiences. Many former pupils reported only good memories, but there were accounts of violence and sexual assault including rape by monks. The programme contains evidence against seven Fort Augustus monks; two headmasters have also been accused of covering-up the abuse. The head of the Benedictines, Dom Richard Yeo, apologised to any victims. In particular, five men were raped or sexually abused by Father Aidan Duggan, an Australian monk who taught at Carlekemp Priory School in North Berwick and Fort Augustus Abbey between 1953 and 1974. Fort Augustus Abbey closed as a school in 1993 and ceased to be a Catholic facility in 1998.

In 2013, an apology was issued by the former headmaster to victims of Fr. Denis Chrysostom Alexander. In 2017, Alexander was arrested in Sydney, Australia and faces an extradition for sexual and physical abuse he reportedly committed at the former Fort Augustus Abbey in the 1970s. In April 2019, the Australian government ruled that he could be extradited, though this has yet to receive final approval from the Federal Court of Australia.

In March 2019, Scottish priest Fr. Robert MacKenzie was arrested in Canada and faces an extradition for sexually abusing children at the now closed Fort Augustus Abbey between the 1950s and 1980s. Canada's Minister of Justice approved the extradition, though an appeal is pending.

=== Wales ===
==== Archdiocese of Cardiff ====
- In 1998, Father John Lloyd, a parish priest and Bishop John Aloysius Ward's former press secretary, was imprisoned for sexual offences involving children.
- In October 2000, Father Joseph Jordan was imprisoned for indecent assaults on boys, and for downloading child pornography from the Internet.
- In 2004, former priest John Kinsey OSB of Belmont Abbey, Herefordshire, was sentenced at Worcester Crown Court for sexual assaults on schoolboys in the mid-1980s.

==== Caldey Abbey ====
In August 2016, three women launched a legal action against Caldey Abbey for sexual abuse, which reached a financial settlement with six claimants. In April 2024, the abbey commissioned an independent review into the historical child sexual abuse. Dozens of children had been sexually abused by a Cistercian monk over decades, involving rape and sexual assault of boys and girls, until his death in 1992. The December 2024, the abbot, Father Jan Rossey, apologised for the abuse and its cover-up. Monks have agreed to a 'no touch' policy for visitors.

== Vatican ==
=== Holy See ===
On 23 June 2018, a Vatican tribunal convicted former diplomat Monsignor Carlo Capella for possessing child pornography while in the Vatican's U.S. nunciature and handed him a five-year prison sentence. Capella, who had also been appointed as a Chaplain of His Holiness by Pope Benedict XVI in 2008, was implicated by 2017.

On 9 December 2019, lawyers brought a sexual abuse lawsuit against the Holy See, regarding an alleged cover up of abuse committed by former Cardinal Theodore McCarrick.

On 19 November 2020, four people who accused McCarrick of sexually abusing them filed a lawsuit against the Holy See in federal court in Newark, New Jersey, saying it had failed in its oversight of McCarrick over whom it exercised complete control as his employer. The Holy See says priests are not its employees and that its status as a foreign sovereign is a defense from such a suit.

=== Vatican City ===
On 14 October 2020, the first ever criminal trial held within the Vatican City for sex abuse began, and involves a priest accused of sexually abusing a former St. Pius X youth seminary student between 2007 and 2012 and another for aiding and abetting the abuse. The accused abuser, Rev. Gabriele Martinelli, 28, was a seminarian and has since become a priest. The other defendant is the seminary's 72-year-old former rector Rev. Enrico Radice, who is charged with aiding and abetting the alleged abuse.

== See also ==
- Catholic Church sexual abuse cases
- Catholic Church sexual abuse cases by country
- Child sexual abuse
- Religious abuse
- Spiritual abuse
