= Anne Smith, Lady Smith =

Scottish lawyer and judge

The Right Honourable Lady Smith
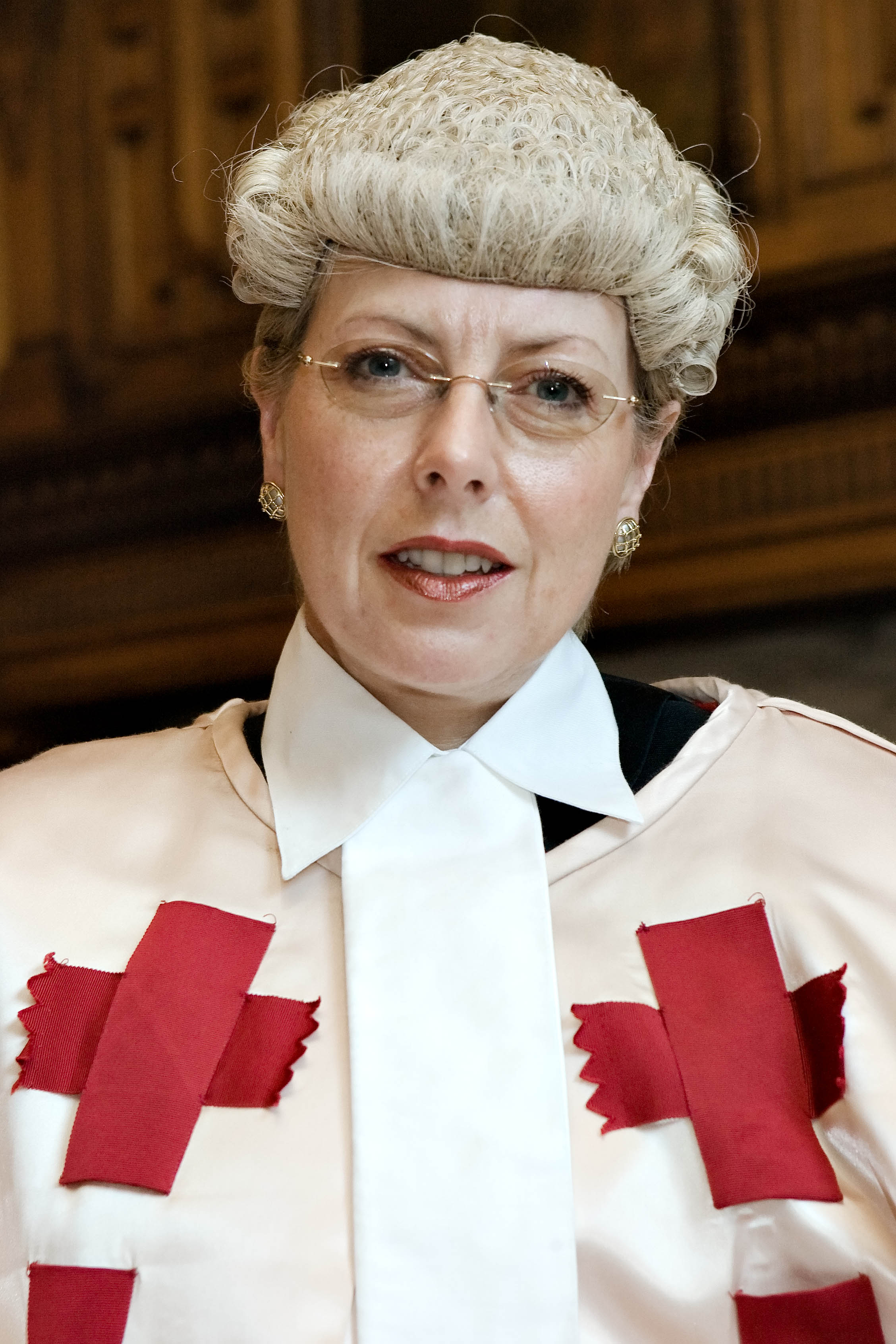
- Official portrait from 2006

Senator of the College of Justice
- Incumbent
- Assumed office 2001
- Nominated by: Henry McLeish; As First Minister
- Monarch: Elizabeth II

Personal details
- Born: Anne Mather; 16 March 1955 (age 71)
- Spouse: David Alexander Smith
- Education: University of Edinburgh
- Profession: Advocate

Anne Smith, Lady Smith, PC (born 16 March 1955) is a Scottish lawyer, and a retired judge. Smith is currently the chair of the Scottish Child Abuse Inquiry.

== Early life ==
Smith was educated at Jordanhill School and Cheadle County Grammar School for Girls, before attending the School of Law of the University of Edinburgh, where she graduated with an LL.B. (Hons.). She served a two-year apprenticeship with Shepherd and Wedderburn WS, and was admitted to the Faculty of Advocates in 1980.

== Legal career ==
Smith worked as standing junior counsel to the Countryside Commission, before becoming a Queen's Counsel in 1993.

She served as a temporary sheriff from 1995 to 1999, as chairman of the Scottish Partnership on Domestic Abuse from 1998 to 2000, and as an advocate depute from 2000 to 2001. In April 2001 she was blamed by Donald Findlay for falling dress standards in the courts. In 1997, she had been the first woman to appear before the Court of Session in trousers; Findlay said that "The drop in standards began when female lawyers were allowed to wear trousers in court. They are all right for going to Tesco in, but not suitable dress for ladies to wear in court." In November 2001, Smith was appointed a judge of the Court of Session and High Court of Justiciary, the Supreme Courts of Scotland, taking the judicial title Lady Smith. Filling the vacancy created by Brian Gill's promotion to Lord Justice Clerk, she was only the third woman to be appointed to the College of Justice.

== Controversies ==
=== Bullying and Discrimination while Chair of the Scottish Child Abuse Inquiry ===
Smith was appointed as chairwoman of the Scottish Child Abuse Inquiry in July 2016; since February 2017 she has been the sole member of the panel. In 2019, a disability discrimination employment claim was made against Smith at the Scottish Child Abuse Inquiry. The allegation was that Smith discriminated, harassed and victimised a junior advocate of the inquiry when he was diagnosed with cancer, undergoing surgery, during chemotherapy and thereafter to date. Smith denied the allegations. The claim was later withdrawn due to fear of costs. On 23 February 2022, an appeal court held that Smith was acting beyond her powers to prevent the BBC from fully reporting on the disability discrimination employment claim against Smith. An order restricting reporting detail of the claim was issued by the Scottish Child Abuse Inquiry and then challenged by the BBC, first through a judicial review and then an appeal of that review decision.

John Halley, a former Counsel to the Scottish Child Abuse Inquiry, has written a book documenting his experience of disability discrimination by Smith. Halley outlines the cover up and corruption by the Scottish legal profession attempting to silence him because he called for an investigation into the historical child abuse allegations against senior legal professionals.

=== Bias and conflict of interest while Chair of the Scottish Child Abuse Inquiry ===
Smith and her Senior Counsel, Andrew Brown KC, have been consistently criticised by survivors, most notably a prominent and vocal group called EA Survivors (ex Edinburgh Academy) founded by survivors brought together through Nicky Campbell. EA Survivors (EAS) has written to the Inquiry expressing strongly negative views about Lady Smith and alleging that she is institutionally biased in favour of prestigious private schools citing:

- The controversial report on Loretto School in Musselburgh, which Smith published in April 2023. Survivors were highly critical of the positive tone adopted by Lady Smith. Her introductory sections describe how Loretto is "set in a leafy campus extending to about 85 acres…close to the sea." "Pinkie House is worthy of particular mention" and according to Lady Smith's report is "Scotland's finest Renaissance Villa." The Times wrote about the survivors' views on the Loretto report.

- A serious conflict of interest as Lady Smith served on the board of governor's of Scotland's leading girls private school, St George's School for Girls. Lady Smith's husband, David Alexander, was educated at Fettes College in the 1960s. Their son and daughter were students at the Edinburgh Academy. Smith has repeatededly refused to disclose this, despite her remit to investigate EA and Fettes. According to former employees of the Scottish Child Abuse Inquiry, Smith has fired people for 'conflict of interest.'

A group of 75 survivors from various backgrounds wrote to the First Minister of Scotland John Swinney in December 2024 demanding that he commence proceedings to remove Lady Smith from her post, on grounds of bias, and recommending replacing her with an impartial chair.

The first EA Survivors full report is available online.

The second report from the survivor group will be available in November 2025.

- work being done to improve safeguarding today.

- progress with criminal convictions.

- collusion and cover up.

- interference and abuse of position.

- systematic mistreatment of whistle-blowers.

Lady Smith's predecessor resigned due to alleged views deemed 'offensive to survivors'.

=== Suicide of survivor attributed to actions of the Scottish Child Abuse Inquiry ===
One survivor, Kevin Sutherland, is believed to have taken his own life after his retroactive request for anonymity in the Scottish Child Abuse Inquiry's public documentation was refused. He had initially waived anonymity until he realized his name and testimony was searchable on the Internet. Lady Smith inexplicably refused his request.

=== Mismanagement of investigations and finances while Chair of the Scottish Child Abuse Inquiry ===
The Scottish Child Abuse Inquiry has been criticised for the limited scope of investigations, mounting costs, and delay.

Smith has been criticised for receiving in two weeks of work at the Inquiry the same amount of money as survivors are given in compensation for a lifetime of suffering.

The inquiry was set up on 1 October 2015. A transcript contract extension indicates the inquiry hearings could run until February 2025, with a possible extension to February 2026. Then the report would need to be written. Another similar but much larger inquiry, the Royal Commission into Institutional Responses to Child Sexual Abuse completed the hearings and final report in just 5 years. The Royal Commission investigated all child abuse not just child abuse while in care.

Abuse survivors have called on the Scottish Child Abuse Inquiry remit to be widened out to include victims who were targeted outwith residential care. Smith rejected this request.

Survivors of child abuse have criticised the Inquiry for not investigating sports and leisure clubs or faith based organisations attended on a day-to-day basis. In 2016, Kezia Dugdale the Scottish Labour Leader at the time, called on the Inquiry to be expanded to include football in light of the evidence of attacks on young players, stating unless the remit of the Scottish Child Abuse Inquiry was widened, the majority of abuse survivors would be "denied justice". Nicola Sturgeon refused to expand the Inquiry because it would take too long to conclude its investigations. Other similar Inquiries have had wider terms of reference to include sport such as the Royal Commission into Institutional Responses to Child Sexual Abuse and have concluded in a shorter time than the Scottish Child Abuse Inquiry.

Survivors of child abuse were ignored when they called for the Inquiry to investigate all allegations of organised abuse and paedophile rings outside of residential care. Graeme Pearson Labour's justice spokesman said there should have been an investigation as to why the child abuse allegations against Conservative MP Nicholas Fairbairn and barrister Robert Henderson were dropped by police, stating "Given the new knowledge we have of the powerful people involved in some of these cases, I think the time is right to revisit this and get a clear understanding of what went on and to ask if [the case] was abandoned, was it abandoned for the right reasons?"

A survivor has criticised an Inquiry report as a 'cover up' as he was not allowed to give evidence about being trafficked to Ireland while in care. Mr Sharp said: "There's no mention of being taken over to Ireland, despite lots of men coming forward and saying the same thing happened to them."

=== Smith unlawful issue of media ban on employment tribunal case against herself ===
On 23 February 2022, an appeal court ruled Smith was found to be acting beyond her powers to prevent the BBC from fully reporting a £2.6m legal claim against Scotland's child abuse inquiry. The legal claim against Smith was an allegation of discrimination and harassment by Smith against the lead junior council of the inquiry. This claim was later withdrawn partially due to potential legal costs. Smith issued an order as the chair of the inquiry restricting media reporting the employment claim. This was challenged by the BBC and subsequently found to be unlawful.

== Personal life ==
Smith married David Alexander Smith, a solicitor, in 1979, with whom she has a daughter and a son. Her husband was at Fettes College in the 1960s and her son was educated at Edinburgh Academy.
