= Redress Scotland =

Executive non-departmental public body of the Scottish Government

Agency overview
- Formed: 2010
- Preceding agency: Scottish Child Abuse Inquiry
- Type: Executive non-departmental public body
- Agency executives: Kirsty Darwent, Chair; Joanna McCreadie, Chief Executive
- Website: www.redress.scot

Redress Scotland is the redress scheme for child abuse in Scotland following the Scottish Child Abuse Inquiry. Based in Glasgow, it is an executive non-departmental public body of the Scottish Government.

The organisation was created by the passing of the Redress for Survivors (Historical Child Abuse in Care) (Scotland) Act 2021. In 2025, it was reported that survivors of abuse within Scotland’s care system would be entitled to more than £150 million in compensation through this scheme. This provides financial redress to individuals who experienced abuse in residential care settings before 2004. According to documents from the Scottish Government, 23 organisations agreed to participate in this scheme, providing financial contributions to compensate victims of historical abuse. Scotland’s 32 local authorities collectively committed up to £100 million over a ten-year period. In addition to local government contributions, religious organisations, charities, and public bodies also pledged financial support to the scheme.

Redress Scotland can award payments between £10,000 and £100,000 with the following eligibility requirements:

- For all priority 1 applications (applicants who have a terminal illness) and all priority 2 applications (applicants who are aged over 68), we would expect the panel to take place within 6 weeks of your application being received by Redress Scotland.
- For Fixed Payment and Next of Kin applications, we would expect the panel to take place within 8 months of the application being received.
- For all other types of application, we would expect the panel to take place within 8 months of the application being received.
- For any application that has been submitted for a Review or a Reconsideration, we would expect the panel to take place within 2 months of your application being received by Redress Scotland.

Since its inception Redress Scotland has been criticised for delays, failures and broken promises and was characterised as "disgusting" by survivors of abuse.

Fornethy House, a former residential school located in Kilry, Blairgowrie, Scotland had been the subject of allegations from over 200 women regarding abuse during the 1960s. Former residents reported experiencing physical beatings, humiliation, and sexual assault while in care. Despite these claims, the government stated that survivors of Fornethy House did not qualify for redress under the Redress Scotland compensation scheme. This decision was based on stringent eligibility criteria, which required evidence of long-term residential care and adherence to specific evidentiary thresholds.

== See also ==
- Scottish Child Abuse Inquiry, which led to the establishment of Redress Scotland
