= Fort Augustus Abbey =

Former Benedictine monastery in Scotland

St Benedict's Abbey
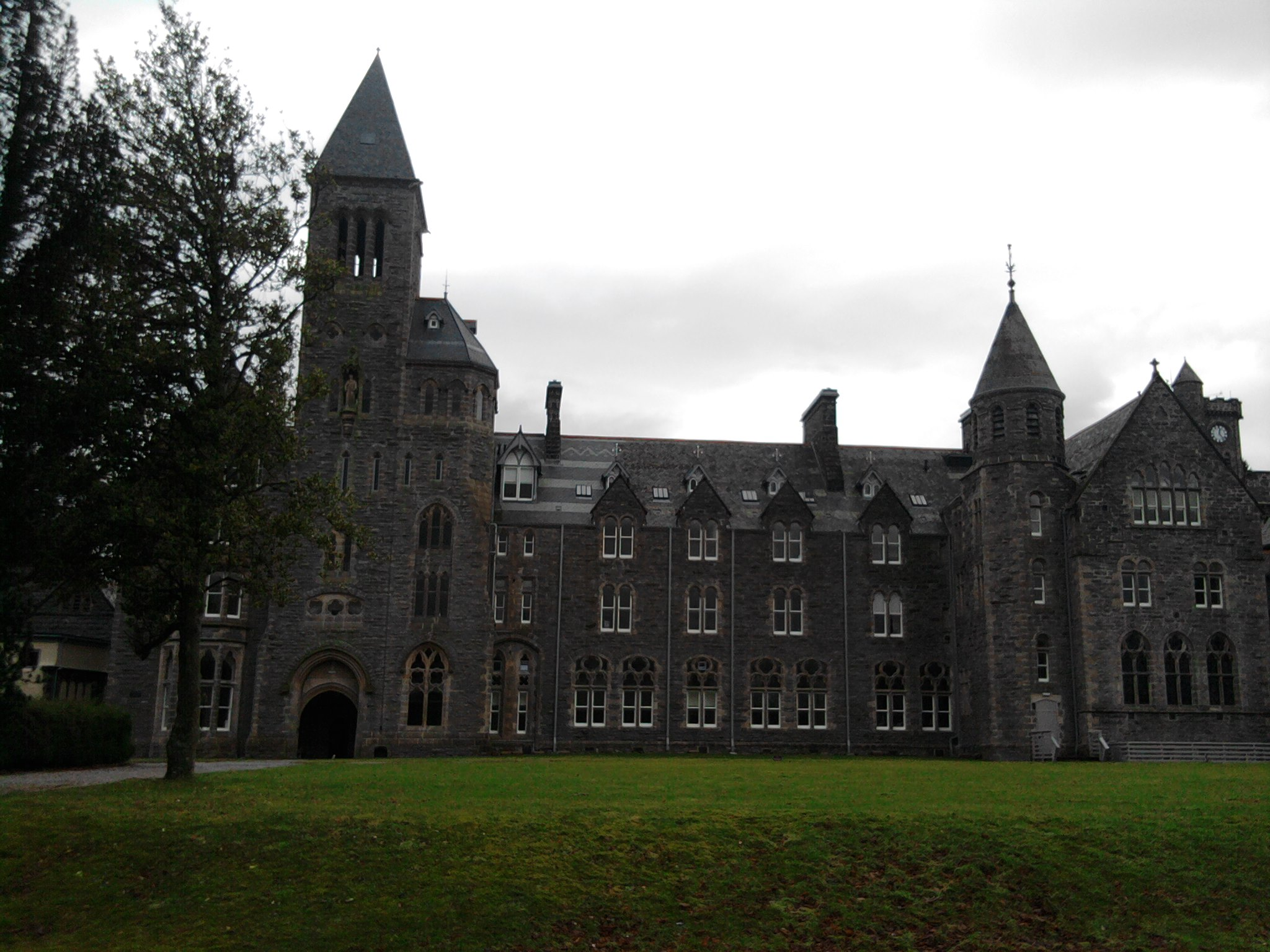
- Interactive map of the St Benedict's Abbey area
- Alternative names: Fort Augustus Abbey

General information
- Type: Benedictine monastery
- Location: Fort Augustus, Inverness-shire, Scotland
- Coordinates: 57.145°N 4.676°W
- Construction started: 1876
- Completed: 1880

Fort Augustus Abbey, properly St Benedict's Abbey, at Fort Augustus, Inverness-shire, Scotland, was a Benedictine monastery, from late in the nineteenth century to 1998 that also housed a school for boys until 1993.

== Inception ==
It owed its inception to the desire of the 3rd Marquess of Bute for the restoration of monasticism in Scotland. The Marquess brought the matter before the superiors of the Anglo-Benedictine Congregation in 1874, promising substantial pecuniary help in the establishment of a house in Scotland, with the understanding that when two other monasteries should have been founded they should all form a separate Scottish congregation. The suggestion was approved of, and the Anglo-Benedictine authorities resolved to incorporate with the Scottish monastery Lamspringe Abbey, in Hanover, which was manned by English monks from 1645 to 1803.

Inadequacy of funds had prevented any lasting restoration of this house, but with the help promised by Lord Bute, it seemed possible to revive it in Scotland. Jerome Vaughan, a brother of Herbert Cardinal Vaughan, was appointed to superintend the work, and succeeded in collecting from rich and poor in England, Scotland, and Ireland, sufficient means for the erection of a fine monastery a cost of some £70,000.

The site at Fort Augustus was given by the 13th Lord Lovat. It comprised the buildings of a dismantled fort, built in 1729 and originally erected for the suppression of Highland Jacobites. It had been purchased from the Government by the Lovat family, in 1867.

The monastic buildings begun in 1876 were completed in 1880, occupying the four sides of a quadrangle about one hundred feet square. In one wing a school for boys of the upper classes was conducted by the monks, with lay masters, for about sixteen years.

== Tutelage of Scottish Benedictines ==
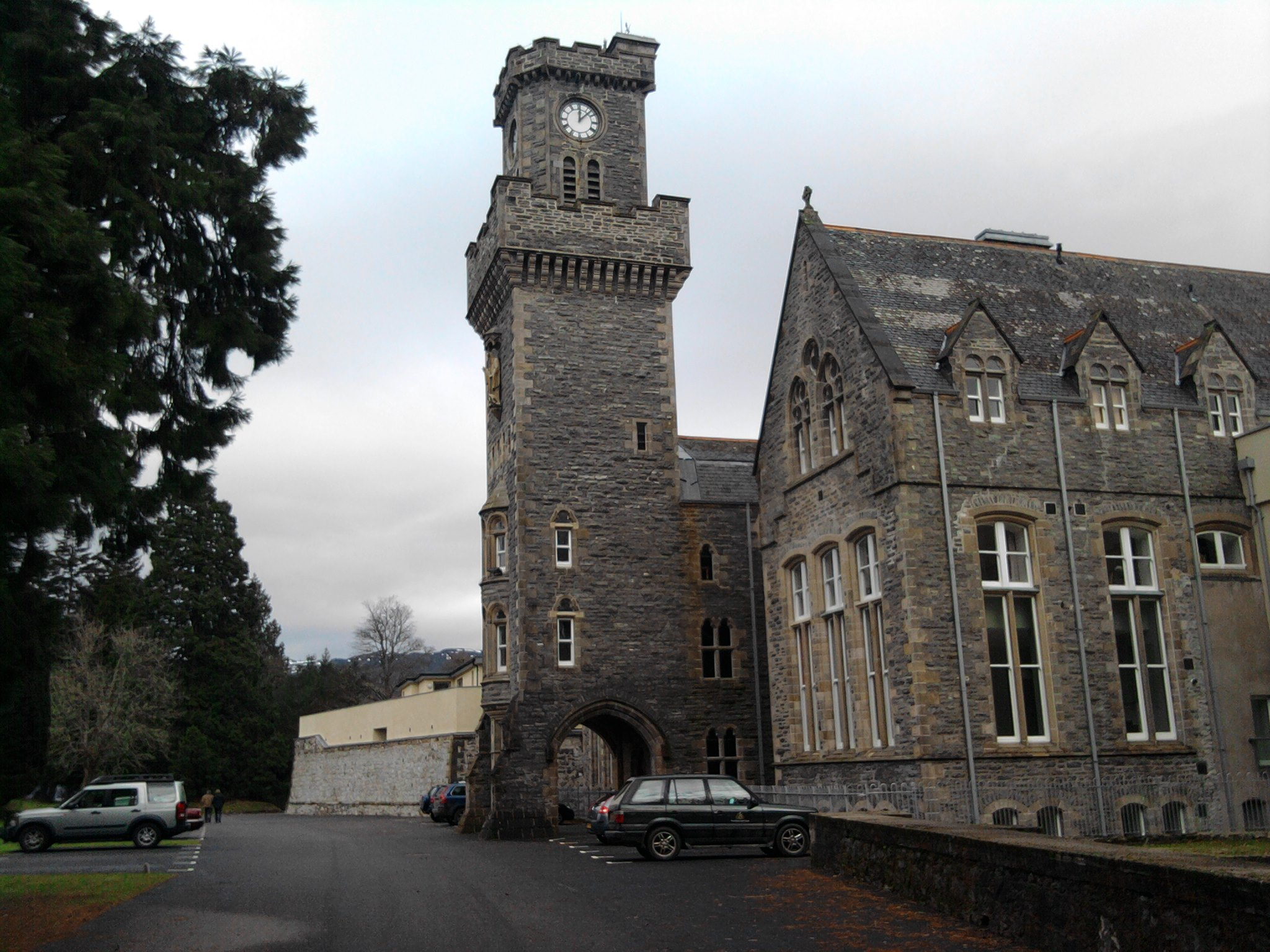
Clock tower

Up to the year 1882 St Benedict's monastery remained under the jurisdiction of the Anglo-Benedictine Congregation, but in response to the wishes of the Scottish hierarchy, and of the leading Scottish nobility—notably Lords Lovat and Bute—Pope Leo XIII, by his Brief "Summâ cum animi lætitiâ", dated 12 December 1882, erected it into an independent abbey, immediately subject to the Holy See, thus separating it from English rule. When this step had been accomplished, Lovat made over the property to the Scottish community, by signing the title deeds, which for a time had been held over.

In 1888, Leo Linse of the Beuronese Benedictine Congregation, who had resided for more than ten years in England, part of that time as superior of Erdington Priory, near Birmingham, was nominated abbot by the Holy See and received the abbatial benediction at the hands of Ignatius Persico, Archbishop of Tamiathis, who had been sent to the abbey as Apostolic Visitor. In 1889, special constitutions, based upon those of the Beuron Benedictine Congregation, were adopted, with the approval of the Holy See, for a term of ten years. These, after certain modifications suggested by experience, received definite approbation in 1901.

From 1893 the Solesmes version of the Gregorian melodies was used in all liturgical services. A church of large size, designed by Peter Paul Pugin, was commenced in 1890, replacing a temporary wooden one.

== Closure ==
In 1993, owing to changing educational patterns in Scotland which caused a falling roll, Abbot Mark Dilworth decided to close the school. This left the monks with no form of outreach and a drastic drop in income. Inverness and Nairn Enterprise (part of Highlands and Islands Enterprise) introduced the monks to entrepreneur Tony Harmsworth, who was commissioned to install a small Heritage exhibition to provide an immediate income for the monks while he devised a rescue package. It quickly became clear that a small business could never generate sufficient income to support the monks and the rambling Victorian buildings so a major project was begun. The business comprised the largest private heritage exhibition in Scotland, study bedrooms converted into tourist bedrooms (which could be used for retreats), a restaurant, gift shop and a number of franchised businesses including a boat operator and re-enactment centre.

The enterprises initially showed great promise, becoming a major tourism force in the Highlands, but it was discovered that the buildings required more costly repairs than had been envisaged. A larger project was being considered with finance from Historic Scotland and the Local Enterprise Company, but the business was closed down before this could be put into effect. The heritage centre was closed in 1998 and when the monks left, the buildings, which had been leased to the monks at £5 per year, reverted to the Lovat Family and were later sold to a consortium including television presenter Terry Nutkins. The original abbey website from its time as visitor centres is remains live.

== Allegations of sexual, physical and emotional abuse ==
In 2013, The Observer newspaper reported that Scottish police were investigating allegations that pupils had been subject to physical and sexual abuse while at the abbey school. A BBC Scotland Investigates programme, entitled Sins of Our Fathers, reported allegations that Fort Augustus Abbey was used as a "dumping ground" for clergy previously accused of abuse elsewhere. Some 50 former pupils spoke of their experiences. Many former pupils reported only good memories, but there were accounts of violence and sexual assault including rape by monks. The programme contains evidence against seven Fort Augustus monks; two headmasters have also been accused of covering up the abuse. The head of the Benedictines, Richard Yeo, apologised to any victims. In particular, five men were raped or sexually abused by Aidan Duggan, an Australian monk who taught at Carlekemp Priory School in North Berwick and Fort Augustus Abbey between 1953 and 1974.

The priest Denis "Chrysostom" Alexander repeatedly sexually abused a pupil. Despite being told not to by Alexander, the pupil told his parents, who complained to the school, who did not inform police. Alexander was sent back to his native Australia, where he was eventually stripped of priestly faculties. The headmaster at the time refused to be interviewed for the BBC programme, but made a statement apologising to the victim and his family for Alexander's abuse.

The NSPCC called for an independent investigation.

In 2017, Denis Alexander was arrested in Sydney, Australia, and faces an extradition for sexual and physical abuse he reportedly committed at Fort Augustus in the 1970s. In 2013, the former headmaster issued an apology for abuse committed by Alexander. In 2019, the Australian government ruled that he could be extradited, though this has yet to receive final approval from the Federal Court of Australia. In June 2021, Alexander pleaded guilty to two charges of lewd, indecent and libidinous practices against two boys between 1973 and 1976.

In May 2017, the priest Michael "Benedict" Seed, a former housemaster, headmaster and chemistry teacher at Fort Augustus, was found guilty of assaulting one former pupil at the school during the 1970s and five other charges against him were found as not proven by a majority of the jury. Giving evidence to the Scottish Child Abuse Inquiry in July 2019, Seed was confronted about an admission he had made to Bishop Hugh Gilbert in 2013 about two indecent sexual relationships with minors at the school. Seed made no further comment on the matter. He retired as parish priest of the village of Brora in 2013 and died of COVID-19 in 2020.

In 2019, the priest Robert MacKenzie was arrested in Regina, Saskatchewan, Canada, and faced extradition for abuse he reportedly committed at the Abbey between the 1950s and 1980s. Canada's Minister of Justice approved this extradition. Following a prolonged series of legal challenges to the extradition process, MacKenzie was extradited in February 2020 and made his first appearance in a Scottish Court on fourteen separate charges the day after arriving back in Scotland. The Scottish prosecution dropped its case against MacKenzie in November 2021 as a result of a 'change in circumstances'.

== Scottish Child Abuse Inquiry ==
In August 2021, after two years of investigation and deliberation, the Scottish Child Abuse Inquiry published its findings on Fort Augustus Abbey School and its preparatory feeder school Carlekemp Priory School in North Berwick.

Lady Smith concluded in her report that "There was a culture of violence at both schools that terrorised many children." She added: "Children were sexually abused at CK[Carlekemp] and FA[Fort Augustus] over many years. Both schools were havens for paedophiles where they had easy access to their chosen victims," concluding "there was a range of sexual abuse, including oral sex and sodomy."

On allegations of decades of systemic physical abuse perpetrated by monks, teachers and older pupils at both schools, Lady Smith writes: "I am satisfied that the regimes at CK and FA were ones where boys were regularly physically abused. Former pupils provided the Inquiry with clear and credible evidence of examples of that abuse. It went far above and beyond what ought to have been acceptable in any school or residential setting."

She concluded "Bullying was rife in both schools, especially at FA. Monks were aware that bullying was prevalent. They failed to control the bullying; on the contrary, there was clear and credible evidence that bullying was encouraged. The nature and extent of the physical abuse meant that many children at the schools lived in constant fear."

== See also ==
- Saint Anselm's Abbey (Washington, D.C.)

== Notes ==
- Archives of Fort Augustus Abbey;
- The Nineteenth Century (October, 1884);
- The Catholic World (New York, September, 1895).
