= St Columba's College, Largs =

Coordinates: 55.80679°N 4.8754°W

St Columba's College was an independent, preparatory Marist college in Largs, Ayrshire. It served as a (boarding and fee-paying) prep school feeder for Catholic boarding schools throughout the United Kingdom with links to St. Joseph's College, Dumfries and Ampleforth. Following the death of a child who had been beaten, the school closed in 1982. Since 1998 a number of reports of sexual and physical abuse of at least 9 pupils dating from between 1950 and 1982 have emerged. Phase 4 of the Scottish Child Abuse Inquiry examined the St Columba's abuse in October 2019.

== History ==
St Columba's College was an independent, preparatory college founded by the Marist Brothers in 1920. The school was small, with total numbers never being above 40 to 45 boys. Landour House had originally been purchased as a holiday home for the Marist Brothers. It served as a (boarding and fee-paying) preparatory school feeder for Catholic boarding schools throughout the United Kingdom with links to St. Joseph's College, Dumfries and Ampleforth College. A number of local day boys would travel to Glasgow daily to continue their education after leaving, typically attending St. Mungo's Academy or St. Aloysius' College. Emphasis was on religious instruction and character building. There was much insistence on discipline, which was very strict. Achievement and academic standards were high.

There were various headmasters in charge including Brother Ralph who was followed by Brother Germanus Paul, also known as David Germanus, real name David Chalmers McKell (1916–99), then Brother Nicholas (who later left the Brothers to get married). Brother Nicholas is mentioned as part of a 'holy fourball' of golfers (given his golfing skills) in "Sam", the autobiography of golfer Sam Torrance, who was a member of Routenburn Golf Club, situated above and adjacent to the school. The various headmasters kept up the tradition of devotion to the Marist cause for the love of the Blessed Virgin Mary, whose statue was to be found on the steep upwards walkway towards the golf course and hills above Largs.

An ethos of severity instigated under headmaster Brother Urban, a lack of innovation and an inability to recruit able graduates from the Marist order all contributed to the college's decline. The school closed in 1982 and the main building was subsequently demolished.

=== Sexual abuse of pupils ===
In 1998, former teacher Norman Bulloch (Brother Norman) made a successful not-guilty plea with respect to the abuse of a pupil at the school between September 1971 and June 1972. Despite the not-guilty plea regarding the St Columba's abuse, Bulloch was jailed for 8 years for the sexual assault of two boys at St Joseph's, Dumfries between 1972 and 1976.

In 2014 the Marist Brothers offered a former full-board pupil compensation following allegations that David McKell (Brother Germanus Paul) had sexually and physically abused him between 1962 and 1964 when he was aged between 7 and 9. This offer was turned down and the case went to the Court of Session. Judge Lady Wolffe ruled that the case be time-barred due to a "long negative prescription". In January 2017, Lord Justice Clerk Lady Dorrian dismissed an appeal in the case.

In June 2014, the head of the Marist Brothers admitted to systemic failures to protect pupils from sexual abuse at the Scottish Child Abuse Inquiry.

In February 2018, former teacher, Peter Toner (Brother Peter) was convicted of sexual and physical abuse of 6 pupils between 1980 and 1982 when the pupils were aged between 8 and 11. This prompted calls from his victims for a wider review of possible abuse he may have carried out elsewhere. Toner was jailed for 10 years for the St Columba's offences in March 2019 with the judge stating, "Your predatory sex offending was a dreadful breach of trust. You wrecked the lives of these young boys. You present a danger of causing serious sexual harm to children". At the time of sentencing Toner was already behind bars for attacking two boys at a different school.

In September 2018 St Columba's was announced as being added to the Scottish Child Abuse Inquiry's investigations with particular focus given to the school in phase 4 of the investigation when hearings looked at residential child care establishments run by male religious orders. In October 2019 the Inquiry heard that one pupil experienced physical and sexual abuse from David McKell and sexual abuse from an unnamed member of teaching staff between 1958 and 1962 when the pupil was aged between 8 and 12.

In November 2021 the Marist Brothers apologised for abuse in Scottish residential schools stating the organisation was "deeply sorry" for the "shocking and distressing" chronic and systemic, sadistic sexual and physical abuse of children in their care.

== Campus ==
The original school building, Landour House, was a category B listed building, built in the 1830s and sited at 118 Greenock Road. The neighbouring house, Northfield, was purchased by the school in the mid-1970s.

The school playing fields on the shore side of Greenock Road were developed for housing prior to the closure of the school.

Landour House was demolished following the closure of the school, while Northfield was converted into flatted accommodation. The grounds of both houses and the school playing fields were subsequently developed for housing. The Landour name is no longer used, however Northfields Park takes its name from the remaining building and Boathouse Road, Drive and Avenue recall the old boathouse which was sited on the shore side of Greenock Road close to the end of Boathouse Drive.

An original cottage beside the site of the old boathouse is all that remains of any of the original buildings in use for the majority of the school's existence. It was used, for a time, as the Matron's accommodation.

== Former staff ==
=== Headmasters ===
- Brother Urban
- Brother Cyprian Edwards (1957–?1958)
- Brother Ralph
- Brother Germanus Paul — David McKell (1958–1973, 1975–1980)
- Brother Nicholas
- Brother Arthur

=== Teaching staff ===
- Brother Alysious
- Brother Nialus
- Brother Robert
- Brother Philip
- Brother Colin
- Brother Eustace
- Brother Joseph
- Brother Antoninus
- Brother Austin
- Brother Francis
- Brother Norman — Norman Bulloch
- Brother Peter — Peter Toner

=== Other ===
- Frank (Cook)
