= Shepherd and Wedderburn =

Commercial law firm, Scotland

Shepherd and Wedderburn LLP
- Type: Private
- Industry: Commercial law
- Founded: 1768; 258 years ago, in Edinburgh
- Founder: David Stewart
- Headquarters: Edinburgh, Scotland, UK
- Area served: United Kingdom
- Services: Legal advice
- Revenue: £53.5m (2017)
- Website: www.shepwedd.com

Shepherd and Wedderburn LLP is a commercial law firm, headquartered in Edinburgh, Scotland, with offices in Glasgow, Aberdeen and London.

The firm delivers multi-jurisdictional legal advice across every business sector, as well as private client and wealth management services.

In 2014, Shepherd and Wedderburn was listed in The Lawyer UK 200 as the fifty-ninth largest firm in the United Kingdom.

== History ==
Shepherd and Wedderburn's history can be traced back to 1768, when David Stewart of Stewarthall was admitted as a Writer to the Signet. Once admitted, Stewart took on an apprentice in William Patrick, and they later practised together under the name of Stewart & Patrick WS.

Following Stewart's death in 1823, Patrick assumed James McEwan of Bardrochat and John Carment, as partners and the firm became Patrick, McEwan & Carment WS. In 1878, after the deaths of Patrick and McEwan, Carment partnered with Joseph Robert Maclagan Wedderburn and Graham Gilbert Watson, and the firm evolved into Carment Wedderburn & Watson WS. Carment Wedderburn & Watson WS merged with Guild & Shepherd WS in 1922, and the firm became Shepherd and Wedderburn.

Shepherd and Wedderburn has since expanded into Glasgow, London, and most recently Aberdeen, when the firm acquired The Commercial Law Partnership in 2016. It also acquired 158-year-old Scottish law firm Tods Murray out of administration in October 2014. Shepherd and Wedderburn now has a total headcount of 492, including 79 partners.

The acquisition of Scottish IFA firm Muirfield in October 2012 saw the launch of Shepherd and Wedderburn's independent financial adviser practice, known today as Shepherd and Wedderburn Financial.

In 2014, Shepherd and Wedderburn acquired Tods Murray LLP, who had appointed administrators.

Shepherd and Wedderburn's Managing Partner, Andrew Blain, was appointed in April 2019.

== Services ==
The practice is focused on three key sectors: Energy and Natural Resources; Real Estate and Infrastructure; and Financial Services. The firm's specialist lawyers also advise on commercial issues in Food and Drink, Hospitality and Leisure, Pharma and Life Sciences and Public Sector.

It is rated by legal directory Chambers and Partners as a Band 1 firm for Energy & Natural Resources: Renewables & Alternative Energy, Real Estate, Employee Share Schemes & Incentives, Competition Law, Corporate/M&A, Planning, and Restructuring and Insolvency.

The Legal 500 ranks Shepherd and Wedderburn as a first tier firm for Energy (excluding oil and gas), Property Litigation, Corporate and Commercial: EU and Competition, Insolvency and Corporate Recovery, Pensions, Edinburgh and Glasgow Commercial Property, Environment, Planning, Leisure and Hospitality, and Intellectual Property, and as one of the Scotland region's first tier firms.

== International Work ==
Shepherd and Wedderburn serves clients in 92 jurisdictions and expanding international revenues account for circa ten per cent of total turnover.

The firm's international activity is supported by an extensive conference participation programme and global membership networks, such as the Energy Law Group and the Anglo American Real Property Institute (AARPI). Shepherd and Wedderburn is a founding member of the World Services Group, which enables the firm to respond to clients' needs swiftly and effectively anywhere in the world.

== Community ==
Shepherd and Wedderburn is a founding member of LawWorks Scotland, which has been established to co-ordinate, develop and encourage the provision of pro bono legal services by solicitors in private practice and in-house and university law schools in Scotland. Since August 2011, Shepherd and Wedderburn volunteers have contributed over 1,100 hours and assisted more than 179 Citizens Advice Bureau clients.

The firm is also a member of PRIME, an initiative founded to ensure fair access to quality work experience for school-age students from diverse backgrounds across the UK. Shepherd and Wedderburn provides work experience placements across the legal profession – not solely focused on the role of lawyers, but also functions like Finance, IT, Human Resources, Marketing and Business Development – showing the different career paths available.

== Awards ==
Recent accolades include:

- Corporate and Commercial Team of the Year 2019
- Banking and Finance Team of the Year 2017, 2018
- Scottish Renewables' Young Professionals Green Energy Awards 2015
- Competition Team of the Year 2014, The Lawyer Awards 2014
- Pro Bono Award, Scottish Legal Awards 2014
- Employee Volunteering Team of the Year, Scottish Business in the Community Awards 2013
