= Scottish Child Abuse Inquiry =

Government inquiry set up in 2015

The Scottish Child Abuse Inquiry was established in October 2015 to inquire into cases of abuse of children in care in Scotland. It was to report and make recommendations within four years by 2019. However, this deadline was later changed to "as soon as reasonably practicable". Concerns have been raised about mounting costs and delays in the inquiry. Six years after the start of the on-going inquiry and long after the original deadline, Anne Smith released a report which was critical of the previous Scottish government for the 'woeful and avoidable' delay in setting up the inquiry.

As of September 2023, after nearly 8 years of the inquiry running, Smith has published zero recommendations to improve the lives of children in care. Victims have called for new laws of mandatory reporting to be implemented in Scotland. This is a legal requirement for those who work with children or in law enforcement to report child sexual abuse which is law in most other countries in the world. The Scottish Child Abuse Inquiry has given no indication if they will support this law reform.

Many criticisms have been made against the Scottish Child Abuse Inquiry. One of the more concerning criticisms is documented in a book by John Halley, former counsel to the Scottish Child Abuse Inquiry. Halley's book A Judicial Monstering: Child Sex Abuse Cover Up And Corruption In Scotland documents his experience of the removal of the first panel by seconded civil servants working for the inquiry and the Scottish government. This panel consisted of Susan O'Brien KC, Professor Michael Lamb and Glenn Houston with John Halley as counsel. Halley outlines how he was hounded to resign by the new chair Lady Smith even when being diagnosed and treated for cancer. Halley brought a disability discrimination claim against Lady Smith and various legal claims which have been marred with conflict of interest and corruption allegations against the Scottish legal world. Halley if he had remained in his position would have continued to push for the investigation of child abuse allegations against senior legal establishment including Lord Hardie. To this date the new chair has refused to investigate the allegations despite it being within the terms of reference.

== Inquiry Team ==
Retired judge Anne Smith was appointed as chairwoman of the inquiry in July 2016. She is supported by a secretariat team, a legal team and legal council.

Prior to the appointment of Smith, the inquiry had a chair, Susan O'Brien, and two panel members, Michael Lamb and Glen Houston. Lamb resigned because of the Scottish government continued interference.

The media contact for the Scottish Child Abuse Inquiry is being managed by the PR firm 3x1 Public Relations.

== Phases of Inquiry ==
By 2022 the inquiry was on its seventh phase. These phases were: (1) Opening statements and timetable (2) Residential child care establishments run by Catholic Orders (3) Residential child care establishments run by non-religious and voluntary organisations (4) Residential child care establishments run by male religious orders within the Roman Catholic Church (5) Child migrants – Abuse of children whose departure from Scotland to countries such as Canada, Australia and New Zealand was part of the child migration programmes (6) boarding schools and (7) foster care case study.

The inquiry investigated over 100 locations of over 50 residential care establishments for children where there were child abuse claims. Between 2018 and 2021 the inquiry issued several reports including four case reports on care homes in Scotland.

In 2021 the inquiry investigated several boarding schools for child abuse including some of Scotland's most famous private schools - Fettes College, Gordonstoun, Loretto, Merchiston Castle, Morrison's Academy (when it was a boarding school), Keil School and Queen Victoria School.

== Redress for survivors of child abuse ==
The Redress for Survivors (Historical Child Abuse in Care) (Scotland) Act was passed in 2021 following the Scottish Child abuse enquiry. Survivors of abuse within Scotland's care system were entitled to more than £150 million in compensation through the Redress Scotland scheme. The initiative provided financial redress to individuals who experienced abuse in residential care settings before 2004.

== Residential care establishments for children run by Catholic Orders ==
=== Daughters of Charity of St. Vincent de Paul orphanages, Smyllum Park and Bellevue ===
In October 2018 the Scottish Child Abuse Inquiry issued a report that dealt mainly with children in the care of Smyllum Park orphanage, Lanark (1864–1981) and Bellevue Children's Home, Rutherglen (1912–1961) run by the Daughters of Charity of St. Vincent de Paul. Children were abused sexually and beaten with leather straps, hairbrushes and crucifixes. The children experienced "no love, no compassion, no dignity and no comfort". The inquiry report states that, for example:

- Children were sexually abused in Smyllum. Children were sexually abused by priests, a trainee priest, sisters, members of staff and a volunteer.
- There was also problematic sexual behaviour by other children.
- Children were physically abused. They were hit with and without implements, either in an excess of punishment or for reasons which the child could not fathom.
- The implements used included leather straps, the "Lochgelly Tawse," hairbrushes, sticks, footwear, rosary beads, wooden crucifixes and a dog's lead.
- For some children, being hit was a normal aspect of daily life.
- The physical punishments meted out to children went beyond what was acceptable at the time whether as punishment in schools or in the home.
- Children who were bed-wetters were abused physically and emotionally.
- They were beaten, put in cold baths and humiliated in ways that included "wearing" their wet sheets and being subjected to hurtful name-calling by Sisters and by other children.
- Many children were force-fed.

The Daughters of Charity responded that the events and practices described were not in accordance with their values, and that they would give the report "our utmost attention". They apologised to anyone who suffered abuse while in their care. In 2025 they agreed to pay up to £10 million to those who had been abused as children at the orphanages.

In August 2018 police arrested and charged nuns and other former staff of Smyllum Park, eleven women and a man (later increased to 17), regarding alleged child physical and sexual abuse. About 11,600 children passed through Smyllum and a single mass grave near the home contained the bodies of up to 400 children.

=== Fort Augustus Abbey School, Inverness and Carlekemp Priory School, North Berwick ===
Fort Augustus Abbey School and Carlekemp Priory were run by Benedictine monks.

Smith concluded: "Children were sexually abused at both schools. A number of monks were serial sexual predators and, because of the movement of monks between Fort Augustus and Carlekemp, they were able to target victims at both schools. Children were cruelly beaten by sadistic monks at both schools, and some beatings had sexual overtones. Children were humiliated and punished inappropriately and excessively. Some children complained to monks in positions of responsibility about being abused. They received either non-existent or inadequate responses."

A representative of the Benedictine monks order gave an "unreserved apology" to everyone affected by the abuse.

In 2013 the BBC broadcast a documentary called "Sins of our Fathers" about the Fort Augustus Abbey School. They described it as uncovering "the shocking truth of physical and sexual abuse at one of Scotland's most prestigious Catholic boarding schools". Five former pupils at Carlekemp Priory School in North Berwick and Fort Augustus Abbey said in this documentary that they were raped by Father Aidan Duggan between 1953 and 1974 when they were young boys. Duggan died in Australia in 2004.

Denis Alexander, who had emigrated to Australia, in 2021 pleaded guilty to two charges of lewd, indecent and libidinous practices against two boys at Fort Augustus between 1973 and 1976 and was jailed for four years and five months. Michael "Benedict" Seed, a former teacher at Fort Augustus, was found guilty of assaulting one child at the school during the 1970s. Five other charges against him were not proven. Robert MacKenzie, who had emigrated to Canada, was extradited from Canada to Scotland in 2020 at the age of 87 to face 14 charges of sexual and physical abuse of young boys at Fort Augustus and Carlekemp. These charges were later dropped.

Carlekemp was closed in 1977 and Fort Augustus in 1993.

=== Marist Brothers Schools St Joseph's College, Dumfries and St Columba's College, Largs ===
Between 1951 and 1980 children in the care of St Joseph's College and St Columba's College suffered abuse that was "shocking and distressing" according to Smith. She said: "Both schools had flawed systems that allowed abusers driven by sexual motives to have easy access to children in their care" and "Marist Brothers in positions of trust at both boarding schools violated their monastic vows and breached the trust of children and their families." Lady Smith found staff at St. Columba's were serial sex offenders.

In 2019 a former teacher, Peter Toner, was jailed for sexually abusing five children at St. Columba's. Another teacher, Germanus Paul (David McKell) was also identified by Smith as an abuser of children. In 1998 former teacher Norman Bulloch was found not guilty of abusing a pupil at the St. Columba's College between 1971 and 1972. However, in 2001 Bulloch was found guilty of the sexual assault of two boys at St Joseph's College between 1972 and 1976 and was jailed for 8 years.

A spokesman for the Marist Brothers said "The Marist Brothers are deeply sorry for the pain and hurt caused to all those who were abused by Marist Brothers, and to others who were affected by the abuse. "We offer our unreserved apology. The Marist Brothers recognise the courage of those who came forward and hope that the inquiry's report brings recognition of their suffering and loss."

Dumfries council took over St. Joseph's college in 1981 and the Marist Brothers closed the St. Columba's College in 1982.

=== Sisters of Nazareth Houses in Aberdeen, Cardonald, Lasswade and Kilmarnock ===
The inquiry found in their report that, between 1933 and 1984, children who had been in the care of Sisters of Nazareth orphanages had encountered sexual abuse "of the utmost depravity." Police had more than 300 complaints from former children who were victims at the houses.

The Sisters of Nazareth said “As we have said before, we apologise wholeheartedly and unreservedly to those who suffered any form of mistreatment." In 2025 they agreed to pay up to £5.75 Million to victims of abuse at their houses. In 2025 two former nurses (Carol Buirds and Eileen McElhinney) and a support worker (Dorothy Kane) were convicted of child abuse at the Nazareth homes in Lasswade and Kilmarnock.

=== St. Ninian's, Falkland ===
Lady Smith's report concluded that St. Ninian's (a residential school run by the Congregation of Christian Brothers, a Catholic organisation) was "a place of abuse and deprivation" particularly from 1969 until the school closed in 1983. The Christian Brothers were able to "pursue their abusive practices with impunity" and the evidence against them was "shocking and distressing". Children in care suffered sexual, physical and emotional abuse.

Michael Madigan, a representative for the Christian Brothers said the congregation acknowledged with "deepest regret" that children had been abused.

Two teachers, Paul Kelly and former headmaster John Farrell, at the school were convicted in 2016 for abusing boys in their care and sentenced to ten years and five years in jail. A third monk, Brother Ryan, had already died in 2013 and could not be tried. In 2022 a former pupil (called AB in the court) was awarded a £1.4 million in damages for the abuse he suffered from these monks at the school. AB described how he had been beaten, raped and molested by Kelly, Farrell and Ryan, and forced to watch other children being abused. The three Christian Brothers often used a dormitory called the "Favourite boys room" where children could be heard screaming while they were being abused.

Michael Murphy, a former monk at St. Ninian's and St. Joseph's school in Tranent, was convicted in 2021 of a further 29 offences against boys at these schools between 1961 and 1981. Murphy subjected boys, some as young as seven or eight, to electric shocks, and brutal beatings and whippings. One victim described how Murphy pushed him into a hole filled with urine and excrement. Another said Murphy made him eat his own vomit. One more victim reported that Murphy crushed his hand and little finger in a vice. This later caused gangrene and the finger had to be partially amputated.

Dave Sharp, a survivor who gave evidence during this case study has been critical of the study outlining that he was prevented from giving evidence about being trafficked as a child. There have been reports of Sexual abuse cases in the Congregation of Christian Brothers in Australia, Canada, England, Ireland and the USA.

== Residential child care establishments run by non-religious and voluntary organisations ==
=== Aberlour Child Care Trust ===
Aberlour was also reported by the inquiry to be a child care institution where children suffered physical, emotional and sexual abuse.

Sally Ann Kelly, the chief executive of Aberlour, said ""We welcome today's interim findings from Smith and wish to again reiterate our unreserved apology to those who suffered abuse while in the care of Aberlour." In 2025 Aberlour agreed to pay £1 million to people Redress Scotland Scheme which was set up to compensate people who had suffered abuse as children in residential care.

=== Barnardo's homes, Tyneholm, Balcary, Glasclune and Craigerne ===
The inquiry concluded in their report that children in care of Barnardo's homes at Tyneholm, Balcary, Glasclune and Craigerne in Scotland in the 1950s and 1960s suffered emotional, sexual and physical abuse.

Martin Crewe, the head of Barnardo's Scotland, said in 2020: "We absolutely apologise for what happened to those individuals. Any instance of abuse is absolutely unacceptable.”. Barnardo's agreed to pay £1 million to the Redress Scotland Scheme which was set up to compensate those who were abused as children in residential care.

=== Quarriers Homes, Inverclyde ===
Quarriers Homes were summarised in the inquiry's report as institutions where children in their care suffered physical, emotional and sexual abuse. Lady Smith said of the children that "scant regard was paid to their dignity".and they lived in "harsh, rigid regimes."

Quarriers also said that their former policy of sending children abroad was "misguided and wrong." The chief executive of Quarriers, Alice Harper, apologised and sad "Vulnerable children were sent away and we recognise that some also suffered physical and emotional abuse, including sexual abuse."

== Boarding schools ==
=== Edinburgh Academy, Edinburgh ===
Seventeen former staff members and teachers from 1953 to the 1990s have been accused by Nicky Campbell, a radio and TV broadcaster for the BBC and Radio 5, of molesting boys at Edinburgh Academy. Campbell described how he was badly beaten up by a teacher who was a leading light in the scripture union. His mother confronted the teacher and received an apology, but the school hushed it up. Campbell also witnessed sexual abuse on his classmates and described Iain Wares as "one of the worst paedophiles in British criminal history". Graham Buck, a former pupil at the junior boarding house, described how, from the age of eight and a half, he was subjected to a systematic campaign of physical and sexual abuse by teacher Wares. He was woken up in the middle of the night and beaten with a wooden bat on several occasions by Wares. After complaints from parents Wares left in 1973 with an excellent reference from Edinburgh Academy. In 2023 Wares was living in South Africa and fighting an extradition request to the UK. The extradition request included four counts of rape, 60 of sexual assault and 25 of assault. He admitted abusing children but not with "intent". The inquiry estimated that generally in Wares' classes about three quarters of the children were abused.

The former deputy head of the preparatory school John Brownlee who was employed by Edinburgh Academy from 1964 to 1995, was accused by multiple former pupils of horrifying abuse to the children in his care. He was accused of being a sadist who regularly beat, punched, kicked and strangled young boys. After stripping one boy naked he abused him with a hosepipe. When Brownlee retired in 1995, Edinburgh Academy gave him a positive write up and described him as a "the confidant of four headmasters." Bronwlee was judged too ill to stand trial. Sheriff Ian Anderson determined that the evidence was adequate to uphold 32 charges, including 30 counts of assault involving young boys. James Burnett the headmaster of the primary school at the time John Brownlee was a teacher there, said at the Inquiry that he had known nothing about the abuse. However The Times reported in 2026 that they had written evidence that Burnett was told of allegations of child abuse in the 1980s but chose to blame the boy who had been abused.

In August 2023 the inquiry heard 14 days of evidence, described as "shocking", about Edinburgh Academy. The evidence made clear that witnessing, and sometimes being made to participate in, abuse was as traumatic as being abused. Survivors said "We were made feral". When actor Iain Glen spoke out about his abuse in 2002, "the wrath of [wealthy Edinburgh suburbs] Morningside and Muirfield and Murrayfield rained down on his head with biblical fury because he'd broken the code, the Edinburgh omertà".

A spokeswoman for the school said in March 2023 "We would also like to reiterate that we deeply regret what has happened in the past. As any like-minded person, we are appalled by such behaviour and we would encourage anyone who has been the victim of abuse to contact Police Scotland.". The rector at Edinburgh Academy, Barry Welsh, also offered an unconditional apology to those who suffered abuse. However James Burnett, the primary school headmaster when John Brownlee was in his post, declined to apologise to individuals whose lives had been harmed. He said "In hindsight I would not do anything different today."

=== Fettes College, Edinburgh ===
Fettes College accepted that Iain Wares, one of its teachers in the junior school, sexually molested boys from 1973 to 1979 and admitted liability. Fettes had sacked Wares in 1979 but described him in a leaving testimonial as “fit, able, conscientious and a man of total integrity.” Wares was then able to take up a job teaching in South Africa where he continued to abuse children. After refusing to prosecute Wares until January 2021, the Scottish Crown Office and Procurator Fiscal Service later in 2021 agreed to seek his extradition from South Africa where he was then living. One former pupil was awarded $450,000 in damages in 2022 for abuse suffered at the school.

=== Gordonstoun, Elgin ===
The enquiry found 82 cases of bullying and 11 alleged incidents of abuse at Gordonstoun. One girl described how she had been raped by an instructor when she was 13. Another girl was raised 7.7 metres in the air in a bosun's chair on a sailing boat and left there for 2.5 hours. A male former pupil said he was drugged and assaulted by a teacher when he was 12 at Aberlour (a feeder school for Gordonston). Andrew Keir, a teacher between 1988 and 1991, was convicted of lewd acts with three boys and was jailed for 12 months. Other children described how there was a "culture of fear" because older and stronger boys would attack, torment and abuse the younger children. There was no help from the school staff. One former pupil said; “No one talked about bullying or pupil to pupil abuse nor did anyone seem concerned about it.” The Principal of the school, Lisa Kerr, said she was shocked to learn that former pupils had been sexually and physically abused while at school and admitted that, in the 1970s-1980s, there had been severe bullying. Some former pupils described incidents of sexual abuse and rape in the decades up to the 1980s. Kerr said "It's been devastating to see the impact of abuse at Gordonstoun has had on them."

=== Keil School, Dumbarton ===
At the time of the inquiry Scottish Police were investigating three former teachers at Keil School for abusing children. A teacher of drama and English who taught in the late 1980s and 1990s (he had been jailed for sexual abusing a boy at a previous English school), another teacher who was at the school from 1991 to 1997 (who committed suicide after being accused) and a third teacher who was there from 1991 to 1997. The school acknowledged that there had been child abuse at the school from 1997 to 2000.

The school closed in July 2000.

=== Loretto, Musselburgh ===
Loretto school admitted that pupils were sexually, physically and emotionally abused by Guy Ray-Hills a French teacher in the 1950s and 1960s. By the time of the enquiry in 2021 Ray-Hills had died.

David Stock, a former teacher at Loretto described a horrifying culture of sexual and physical abuse by older bullies at the school on younger pupils in the 1980s and early 1990s. When he brought this to the attention of the school authorities they dismissed them. He said the school authorities targeted him, he was forced to resign and sign a non-disclosure agreement. The school responded: "...To anyone who suffered abuse while attending Loretto, we deeply regret the distress caused and offer an unreserved apology.". Angus Bell, a former pupil gave evidence to the enquiry and sued the school for £1 million in 2023 because he was sexually, emotionally and physically abused by older pupils in the 1990s. He said under the "fagging" system teachers outsourced discipline of younger boys to older boys who treated the younger boys as slaves. “I witnessed kids set on fire, their genitals mutilated from gang beatings with boots. Boys were raped with objects in front other boys. We were beaten with hockey sticks and cricket bats daily. Beds were urinated and defecated on by our tormentors. I was whipped with belt buckles, thrown down flights of stairs, waterboarded in dirty toilets, locked in trunks, strangled. Kids were hung out of windows, their heads beaten off the ground until they foamed at the mouth...."

Abuse survivors have accused Smith of displaying bias after claiming she cut and pasted positive descriptions about Loretto directly from its website and placing this in the final report. Lady Smith concluded that "Loretto pupils suffered sexual, physical and emotional abuse."

=== Merchiston Castle, Edinburgh ===
Former pupils at Merchiston described how life for children there was akin to "Lord of the Flies" with vicious beatings and improper touching by some staff. One housemaster, James Rainy Brown, was reported as watching first year boys sit naked in a bath of cold water as their punishment (Brown later committed suicide while being investigated by the police). Another teacher named Edward had a reputation for inappropriately touching boys after punishment or after an injury at sports - described by one as “Usually when he had caned boys he would massage them, then have a feel around...." Other comments were "You had to accept there was a form of corruption and basically the school would behave in whatever manner pleased it...” and (talking about bullying) that staff did “nothing whatsoever” to help pupils.

A lawyer for Merchiston Castle school said at the inquiry that "it was clear with at least one former member of staff the dots were never to be joined. The school profoundly regrets and sincerely apologises for the fact that such experiences were endured by some pupils." He offered an "unreserved apology" on behalf of the school. The headmaster, Jonathan Anderson admitted that there had been abuse at the school between 1930 and 2014. However Anderson said it was "not fair" to single out boys schools as a "predatory culture" was an issue for all schools.

=== Morrison's Academy, Crieff ===
The report of the Inquiry into Morrison's Academy concluded that the school "...harboured a culture of violence and emotional abuse." Staff at Morrison's used corporal punishment excessively and inappropriately, and the school's response to this misuse was insufficient. Former pupils at the school described how teachers took"delight" in caning children. One ex-pupil described how, when he was 12 or 13, his wrist was broken because of the savage beating he got from a teacher.

The report also noted that some older pupils at Morrison's abused younger children, primarily within the boarding houses. This included physical abuse sexual abuse and bullying. Prefects also inflicted physical violence, emotional abuse and corporal punishment.

A strong culture of silence around abuse existed—children were discouraged from "telling," and those who did faced mistreatment from peers. There was little encouragement for children to speak up or voice concerns. Morrisons apologised to former pupils who, from the 1950s to the 1990s, had been emotionally and physically abused at the school.

=== Queen Victoria School, Dunblane ===
The Inquiry reported that at this school, "terrifying" abuse went on for years.

A lawyer representing the school apologised and expressed deep regret to former pupils who had been abused. A few teachers physically and emotionally abused children under the pretence of corporal punishment, using belts, slippers, a cricket bat, and heavy wooden dusters to instil fear. Two teachers were said to have abused children sexually, one during the years 1973-1993 and the other from 2011 to 2019. Housemaster Glenn Harrison (1989–1991), whose complaints of physical, emotional and sexual abuse were ignored, eventually went public. He was thrown out of his flat by the school bursar and the Police, 18 days before the end of his contract with the Ministry of Defence. After writing to the Police for over 35 years asking for an explanation, he has been completely ignored.

Violence from older boys toward younger ones was widespread; in one instance, a child was even threatened with being thrown down a lift shaft. One former pupil said, that when he was 13, he was physically and sexually abused by an older boy at the school. He reported this to the headmaster, who did nothing, and he was afterwards subjected to even more vicious bullying and sexual abuse. He was not supported by teachers who ostracised him. The school admitted that abuse had occurred.

== Criticism ==
=== Limited scope of investigations ===
Abuse survivors have called on the Scottish Child Abuse Inquiry remit to be widened out to include victims who were targeted outwith residential care. Lady Smith rejected this request.

Survivors of child abuse have criticised the Inquiry for not investigating sports and leisure clubs or faith based organisations attended on a day-to-day basis. In 2016, Kezia Dugdale the Scottish Labour Leader at the time, called on the Inquiry to be expanded to include football in light of the evidence of attacks on young players, stating unless the remit of the Scottish Child Abuse Inquiry was widened, the majority of abuse survivors would be “denied justice”. Nicola Sturgeon refused to expand the Inquiry because it would take too long to conclude its investigations. Other similar Inquiries have had wider terms of reference to include sport such as the Royal Commission into Institutional Responses to Child Sexual Abuse and have concluded in a shorter time than the Scottish Child Abuse Inquiry.

Survivors of child abuse were ignored when they called for the Inquiry to investigate all allegations of organised abuse and paedophile rings outside of residential care. Graeme Pearson Labour's justice spokesman said there should have been an investigation as to why the child abuse allegations against Conservative MP Nicholas Fairbairn and barrister Robert Henderson were dropped by police, stating "Given the new knowledge we have of the powerful people involved in some of these cases, I think the time is right to revisit this and get a clear understanding of what went on and to ask if [the case] was abandoned, was it abandoned for the right reasons?"

A survivor has criticised an Inquiry report as a 'cover up' as he was not allowed to give evidence about being trafficked to Ireland while in care. Mr Sharp said: “There's no mention of being taken over to Ireland, despite lots of men coming forward and saying the same thing happened to them.

=== Petition to include state schools in the Inquiry was rejected ===
In 2019, a petition was made to the Scottish Parliament by Maryanne Pugsley. Pugsley said she wanted to raise the issue after she was "sexually and emotionally abused by a teacher in a state school in Scotland". The petition also seeks a review of the law of corroboration because of the difficulties facing victims who raise historic cases of abuse. Pugsley said: "I have concerns over Scotland's independent inquiry into the abuse of children in care, which currently excludes the victims of historical abuse in state schools in Scotland. I believe this disservice repudiates a fundamental right of the victims of child sexual abuse and of the subsequent repercussions in relation to the safeguarding of our children within state schools. The discrimination against the victims of historical childhood abuse within state schools being excluded from the current in care inquiry into child abuse is unfair."

=== Mounting costs ===
In July 2021, it was reported by The Times that the inquiry costs had soared to more than £33,000 a day with the total approaching £50 million. The inquiry cost more than £3 million between 1 April 2021 and 30 June 2021, despite not sitting since 27 May 2021. By comparison for cost, the completed Royal Commission into Institutional Responses to Child Sexual Abuse was a total of AUD$372 million for a much wider terms of reference including child abuse outside residential care and covering the whole of Australia. The cost of the incomplete Scottish inquiry on 31 December 2021 was £51,655,410. By 31 December 2021, the cost per head of the population for the complete Australian inquiry with final recommendations was approximately £7.5 per head of population whilst the incomplete Scottish inquiry with narrower terms of reference and continued rising costs was £9.5 per head of population.

=== Slow pace of the inquiry ===
The inquiry was set up on 1 October 2015. A transcript contract extension indicates the inquiry hearings could run until February 2025, with a possible extension to February 2026. Then the report would need to be written. Another similar but much larger inquiry, the Royal Commission into Institutional Responses to Child Sexual Abuse completed the hearings and final report in just 5 years.

=== Lack of open justice ===
On 23 February 2022, an appeal court ruled Smith was found to be acting beyond her powers to prevent the BBC from fully reporting a £2.6m legal claim against Scotland's child abuse inquiry. The legal claim against Smith was an allegation of discrimination and harassment by Smith against the lead junior council of the inquiry. This claim was later withdrawn partially due to potential legal costs. Smith issued an order as the chair of the inquiry restricting media reporting the employment claim. This was challenged by the BBC and subsequently found to be unlawful.

=== Investigation of the Crown Office ===
On 7 May 2019, it was reported that the Crown Office said it anticipates to be investigated by the inquiry. By March 2022, the Crown Office has not been identified as an institution for investigation. The 2019 disclosure from the Crown Office came after a lawyer appointed to the inquiry brought up concerns that young people in care were being let down by a prosecution policy that did not capture sexual exploitation through prostitution. Other similar inquiries such as the Royal Commission into Institutional Responses to Child Sexual Abuse have investigated prosecution and the decisions made in relation to prosecution of child sexual assault.

=== Scottish Government interference ===
In June 2016, Michael Lamb, a key member of the panel resigned due to government interference. Susan O'Brien, the former chair of the inquiry resigned, stating that her position has been “actively undermined” by officials.

== Other similar child abuse investigations ==
In the wake of the Jimmy Savile sexual abuse scandal an investigation was set up in 2014 by the then British home secretary Theresa May into how the institutions in England and Wales handled their duty of care to protect children from sexual abuse. This was called the Independent Inquiry into Child Sexual Abuse and was still ongoing in 2022.

The Northern Ireland Historical Institutional Abuse Inquiry was described in a 2014 BBC article as "the biggest child abuse public inquiry ever held in the UK" and investigated historical institutional sexual and physical abuse of children in Northern Ireland. It ran from 2014 to 2016 and covered institutions in Northern Ireland that provided residential care for children from 1922 to 1995 but excluded most church-run schools.

In 1995 the Australian government started an inquiry into the treatment of Aboriginal children. In 1997 they issued the Report of the National Inquiry into the Separation of Aboriginal and Torres Strait Islander Children from Their Families (Bringing them home) - sometimes known as the "Stolen Generations" controversy. A second Australian inquiry was the Royal Commission into Institutional Responses to Child Sexual Abuse which ran from 2013 to 2017. It investigated instances and allegations of child sexual abuse in Australia.

The Commission to Inquire into Child Abuse (the Ryan Commission) was established in Ireland in 2000 to investigate physical, sexual and emotional abuse and neglect in "a school, an industrial school, a reformatory school, an orphanage, a hospital, a children's home and any other place where children are cared for other than as members of their families."

The Truth and Reconciliation Commission of Canada was started in 2008 and between 2009 and 2015 it documented the history and lasting impacts of the Canadian Indian residential school system on Indigenous students and their families. The final report in 2015 concluded that the school system (of which 70% was administered by Catholic schools and the remainder by schools of other religious denominations) amounted to cultural genocide. The Canadian National Centre for Truth and Reconciliation, set up in 2007 at the University of Manitoba in Winnipeg, is the repository for material collected by the Truth and Reconciliation Commission of Canada.

== See also ==
- List of public inquiries in the United Kingdom
