= Patrick Colleary =

Patrick Colleary is an Irish Roman Catholic priest accused of molesting a person under the age of 15 while a priest at Holy Spirit Catholic Church in Tempe, Arizona.

He was suspended in May 2002 after he admitted fathering a child with a woman named Sharon Roy in 1978. She claimed the encounter was non-consensual. However, in a 1997 article, Ms. Roy spoke of a consensual physical relationship with Colleary. In 2002, Colleary was jailed for a month after being accused of molesting a young man, but charges were dismissed under the statute of limitations.

In 2003, Colleary was indicted on a separate molestation charge, and another warrant was issued for his arrest. He is currently living in Ireland, and has since fought extradition back to Arizona. His legal team has cited concerns related to Maricopa County Sheriff Joe Arpaio as part of their opposition to extradition. Colleary has denied all charges.

== See also ==
- Roman Catholic Church sex abuse scandal
- Roman Catholic priests accused of sex offenses
- Sex Crimes and the Vatican (Panorama Documentary Episode)
- Ferns Report, on sexual abuse in the Roman Catholic Diocese of Ferns (Ireland)
- Barbara Blaine founder of SNAP (Survivors Network for those Abused by Priests)
