= Catholic Church sexual abuse cases =

Reports of the sexual abuse of minors by Catholic clergy and members of religious orders have been documented in numerous countries. Beginning in the late 20th century, allegations and subsequent investigations revealed long-term patterns of misconduct and, in some instances, failures by Church authorities to address or disclose allegations. Victims were primarily boys, though girls were also affected, from early childhood to adolescence. As public awareness grew, more adults reported past abuses, leading to criminal prosecutions, civil litigation, and internal Church reviews.

By the 1990s and early 2000s, major inquiries in multiple countries identified systemic shortcomings in how abuse was reported and handled. The Boston Globe's 2002 investigation — later depicted in the film Spotlight — brought attention to the issue in the United States and contributed to broader international scrutiny. Between 2001 and 2010, the Holy See reviewed about 3,000 cases involving priests, some of which dated back decades. Scholars have noted that sexual abuse is generally underreported, making it difficult to determine the full extent of the problem.

In response to the crisis, successive popes issued statements and implemented some reforms. John Paul II described sexual abuse within the Church as "a profound contradiction of the teaching and witness of Jesus Christ". Benedict XVI met with victims, expressed "shame" for the harm caused, and criticized failures by Church leaders. Pope Francis initially faced criticism for comments related to a Chilean case but later apologized for what he called a "tragic error", convened a global meeting of episcopal conference presidents in 2019, and introduced measures intended to increase transparency and accountability. Pope Leo XIV, while serving as a bishop, publicly encouraged victims to report abuse and rejected secrecy in an interview, though some critics have alleged that he mishandled cases during his tenure in Chiclayo.

Debate has continued about the extent and framing of media coverage. Some Catholic commentators argue that reporting has at times reflected anti-Catholic bias and emphasize that abuse also occurs in other religious and secular institutions. Studies cited by psychologists, including Thomas G. Plante, have found no evidence that Catholic clergy abuse minors at higher rates than other adult men or clergy from other traditions. Others maintain that the global scale of documented cases within the Church warrants sustained scrutiny, focusing on how institutional structures, cultural norms, and patterns of clerical authority may contribute to abuse or impede accountability.

== Origins ==
Percentage of Catholics by country (2010).

Reports of sexual abuse of minors by Catholic clergy and members of religious orders have appeared throughout the Church's history. Early references include Peter Damian's eleventh century Liber Gomorrhianus, which condemned clerical misconduct, as well as Martin Luther's sixteenth-century criticisms of abuses within the Roman Curia.

One of the earliest documented internal warnings came from American priest Gerald Fitzgerald, founder of the Congregation of the Servants of the Paraclete. In the 1950s he cautioned bishops and Vatican officials that priests who had abused minors were "unlikely to change and should not be returned to ministry." His concerns, raised directly with Pope Paul VI, foreshadowed later debates about the reassignment of accused clergy and the adequacy of Church oversight.

In 2002, The Boston Globe's investigation into the Archdiocese of Boston revealed extensive patterns of abuse and institutional concealment, prompting national and international scrutiny. The reporting, later depicted in the film Spotlight, led to criminal prosecutions, resignations, and broader inquiries into clerical abuse in the United States and abroad. A subsequent investigation by The Dallas Morning News found that some accused priests had been transferred to other countries and reassigned to roles involving contact with children, and that nearly half of 200 examined cases involved attempts to evade law enforcement.

In the modern era, allegations have been documented in many countries, including the United States, Canada, Ireland, the United Kingdom, the Philippines, Belgium, France, Germany, and Australia, with additional cases reported elsewhere. Many complaints involve incidents that occurred decades earlier, and national inquiries have consistently identified patterns of delayed reporting, inadequate oversight, and failures to remove accused clergy from ministry.

In Ireland, a series of government-commissioned reports found widespread physical and sexual abuse in Church-run institutions from the mid-twentieth century onward and concluded that both ecclesiastical and state authorities failed to protect children or respond adequately to allegations. In Australia, police investigations and advocacy groups documented numerous cases, prompting the establishment of a national Royal Commission in 2013 to examine institutional responses to child sexual abuse.

In Latin America, one very prominent case involved Marcial Maciel, founder of the Legion of Christ, whose misconduct over many decades eventually prompted a Vatican-led apostolic visitation and subsequent reforms of the congregation. Other countries in the region, including Chile and Argentina, have reported cases that led to public inquiries, episcopal resignations, and internal Church investigations.

Scholars and Church officials have noted that abuse in parts of Africa, Asia, and Latin America is difficult to measure due to limited reporting, hierarchical structures, and cultural barriers to disclosure. In Tanzania, allegations involving clergy became public decades after the events following a media investigation. In the Philippines, reports increased after extensive media coverage in 2002, while academic Matthew N. Schmalz has observed that in India allegations often remain informal and rarely progress to formal charges.

== Notable cases ==
=== Americas ===
==== Central America ====
In Costa Rica, several priests have faced criminal and canonical proceedings. High-profile cases include Mauricio Víquez, laicized in 2019 and later sentenced to twenty years in prison for abusing a minor, and Manual Guevera who was arrested following complaints in the same year. Additional cases have involved clergy detained at borders, convicted of sexual offenses, or investigated for misconduct.

In the Dominican Republic, Józef Wesołowski, former apostolic nuncio, was laicized in 2014 after allegations of abusing minors. He died in 2015 before a Vatican criminal trial could proceed. In El Salvador, multiple priests, including Jesús Delgado, Francisco Gálvez and Antonio Molina, were laicized after canonical findings of abuse committed between 1980 and 2002. Additional cases have resulted in suspensions, public apologies, and Vatican-imposed sentences. In Honduras, Pope Francis accepted the 2018 resignation of Auxiliary Bishop Juan José Pineda following allegations of sexual misconduct involving seminarians' concerns about financial irregularities.

==== Canada, Mexico, and the United States ====
One of the most significant Canadian cases involved the Mount Cashel Orphanage in St. John's, Newfoundland, where more than 300 former residents reported abuse by members of the Christian Brothers. The order later filed for bankruptcy in response to extensive civil litigation. Other major cases include convictions of priests such as Charles Henry Sylvstre and Williamson Hodgson Marshall, both found guilty of abusing minors over several decades. Abuse has also been documented in Catholic run residential schools attended by thousands of First Nations children, as Manitoba leader Phil Fontaine described his own experiences of abuse, and author Michael D. O'Brien revealed that abuse was an epidemic in "residential schools and orphanages."

In Mexico, the most widely known case involved Marcial Maciel, founder of the Legion of Christ, who was accused of abusing numerous minors and fathering children. After years of denial by the order, the allegations were acknowledged in 1998, and Maciel was removed from ministry in 2006. Other cases have resulted in significant criminal results, including the 2021 conviction of Luis Esteban Zavala Rodríguez for the rape of a twelve-year-old girl.

The United States has seen extensive litigation, investigations, and reforms related to clerical abuse. BishopAccountability.org has documented more than 3,000 civil lawsuits, with settlements exceeding 3 billion dollars since 1950. Numerous dioceses, including those in Los Angeles, Portland, Seattle, Denver, Louisville, Boston, and Dallas, have reached major settlements or filed for bankruptcy in response to large numbers of claims. Public awareness increased in the 1980s following cases such as that of Louisiana priest Gilbert Gauthe, who pleaded guilty in 1985 to multiple counts of child molestation. National attention intensified in 2002 with The Boston Globe's reporting, which revealed widespread abuse and prompted additional lawsuits, criminal cases, and policy reforms.

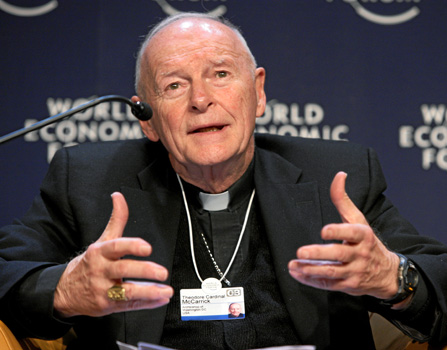
Theodore McCarrick (1930–2025), ordered in 2018 by Pope Francis to a life of prayer and penance. Found guilty of sexual crimes against adults and minors and abuse of power, he was dismissed from the clergy in February 2019. He was the most senior church official in modern times to be laicized and was the first cardinal laicized for sexual misconduct.

Subsequent high-profile cases included the conviction of Minnesota priest Curtis Wehmeyer in 2011, the 2018 resignation of Cardinal Theodore McCarrick following allegations of abuse, and a Pennsylvania grand jury report identifying more than 300 accused priests over several decades.

In 2017, the release of The Keepers renewed allegations that the Archdiocese of Baltimore had concealed abuse by Rev. A. Joseph Maskell; a 2023 report from Maryland Attorney General later identified more than 600 victims of clergy abuse over the past 80 years, with the archdiocese stating that it was "firmly committed to holding suspected abusers accountable". That same year, the archdiocese filed for Chapter 11 bankruptcy, a step that paused ongoing lawsuits and moved all claims into the bankruptcy process.

In 2019, Archbishop Anthony Apuron of Guam was removed from office after being found guilty in a canonical trial of abusing minors in the 1970s. Additional cases have continued to emerge, including a 2023 lawsuit in Colorado alleged more than one hundred instances of abuse at a single parish.

In December 2019 a judge approved a settlement that called for the New Orleans Archdiocese to pay at least $230 million to hundreds of abuse survivors. Six months later the Archdiocese filed for bankruptcy rather than deal with more than 500 abuse claims separately.

==== South America ====
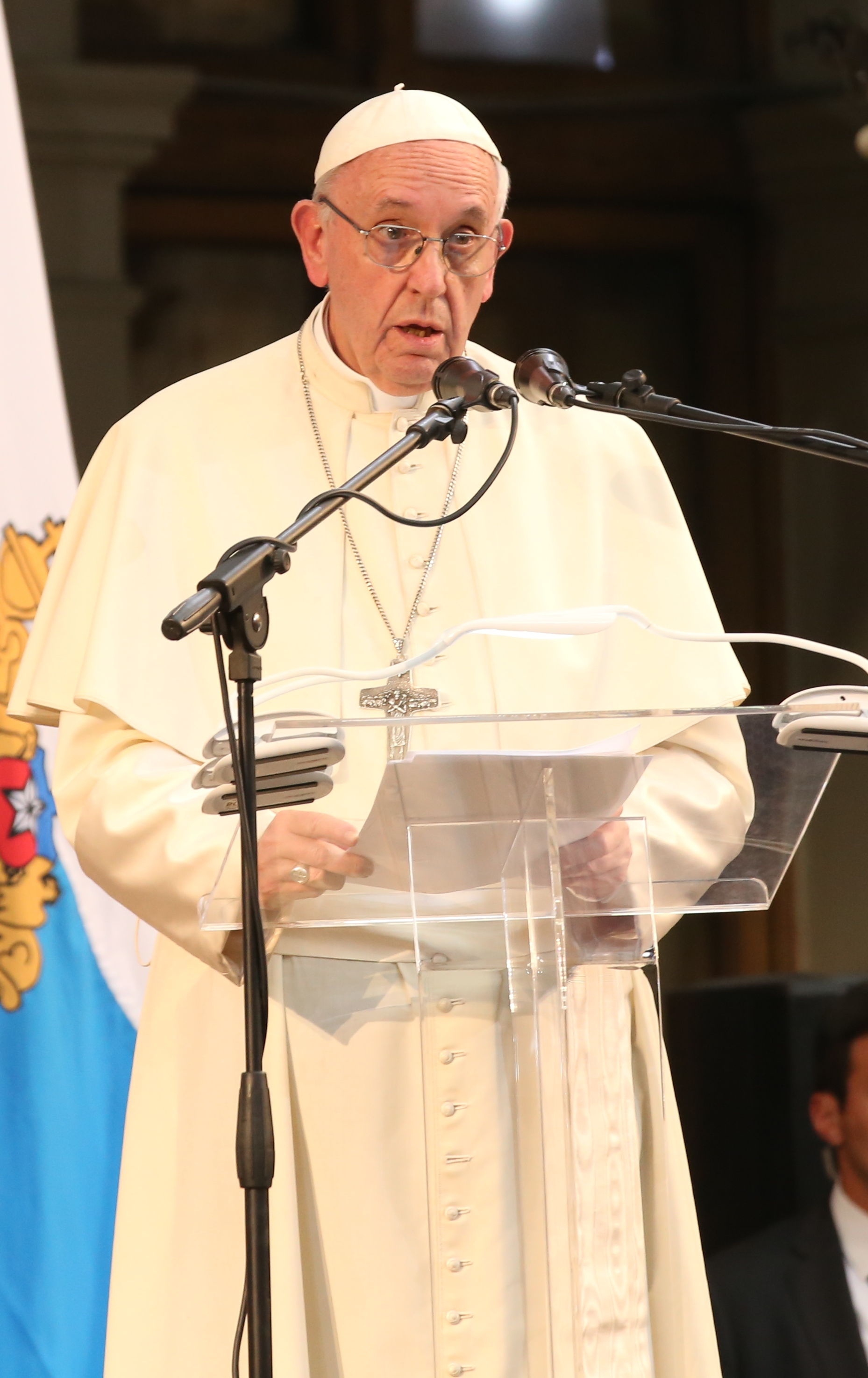
Pope Francis speaks at the Pontifical Catholic University of Chile (2018). The Catholic Church in Chile in 2018 suffered one of the most severe Catholic sexual abuse cases, including the Fernando Karadima case.

In Argentina, priest Julio César Grassi was sentenced in 2009 to fifteen years in prison for abusing minors. In 2019, Bishop Sergio Buenanueva publicly acknowledged the Church's history of abuse, while former priest Carlos Eduardo José was cleared of charges that year due to the statute of limitations, despite multiple complaints

In Bolivia, renewed scrutiny followed the 2023 disclosure that former priest Alfonso Pedrajas had written in his diary about abusing dozens of children in the 1970s and 1980s. Pope Francis subsequently sent Monsignor Jordi Bertomeu to investigate. Earlier cases included the 2013 arrest of a priest accused of assaulting seminary students.

In Chile, allegations involving Fernado Karadima and concerns about a cover-up by Bishop Juan Barros led to a major Vatican investigation in 2018. After receiving Archbishop Charles Scicluna's report, Pope Francis acknowledged errors in assessing the situation. Numerous bishops offered their resignations, several were accepted, and Karadima and other senior clerics were laicized. Additional inquiries were later opened, including one involving Archbishop Bernardino Piñera.

In Colombia, investigations in 2021 and 2022 identified numerous priests accused of abuse in Medellín and Villavicencio, though relatively few cases resulted in criminal convictions. In 2020, the Constitutional Court ordered the Church to release internal complaint files, but full compliance has not yet been achieved.

=== Asia ===
In East Timor, former priest Richard Daschbach was convicted in 2021 of sexually abusing girls over several decades. In 2022, allegations of sexual abuse against Bishop Ximenes Belo were reported in De Groene Amsterdammer.

In India, scholars have noted that many allegations remained unreported or do not progress to formal charges. Several high-profile cases have emerged, including the 2014 arrest of priest Raju Kokkan in Kerela, the 2017 conviction of the priest Robin Vadakkumchery for raping a minor, and the 2018 arrest of Bishop Franco Mulakkal, who was acquitted in 2022 before retiring in 2023. Additional controversies have arisen over the reassignment of clergy previously convicted or investigated for abuse.

In Singapore, author Jane Leigh alleged in a 2013 autobiography that she had been abused by priests as a teenager, prompting a Church inquiry. In 2022, a member of a Catholic order was sentenced to five years in prison for sexually abusing two boys, and his superior received a police advisory for failing to report the offenses.

=== Europe ===
In Austria, a 2010 report documented physical, sexual, and emotional abuse by 422 alleged perpetrators, most of whom were priests. In 1995, Austrian Cardinal Hans Hermann Groër resigned as Archbishop of Vienna following allegations of abuse. In Belgium, police raided Church offices in 2010 due to an investigation into abuse allegations following Bishop Roger Vangheluwe's resignation, as he admitted to molestation. The Vatican protested the raids, and a court later ruled them illegal. In Croatia, three priests were convicted in separate cases in the Archdioceses of Zagreb, Rijeka, and Zadar between 2000 and 2012.

In France, an independent investigative commission set up by the Church reported in 2021 that an estimated 3,000 clergy and religious personnel had abused approximately 216,000 children since 1950, with the total rising to about 330,000 when including lay Church employees. Archbishop and cardinal Philippe Barbarin was convicted in 2019 for failing to report abuse by priest Bernard Preynat, although the conviction was later overturned on appeal; Pope Francis accepted his resignation in 2020. Preynat was first laicized by the Church and later sentenced to five years in prison. Former nuncio Luigi Ventura also received a suspended sentence in 2020 for sexual harassment.

In Germany, a 2018 Church-commissioned study found that 3,677 minors had been abused by clergy between 1964 and 2014, and a 2020 report identified more than 1,400 additional accusations involving members of religious orders. In 2021, Cardinal Reinhard Marx offered his resignation, citing institutional failures, though Pope Francis declined to accept it.

In Italy, the justice system handled about 300 cases of clergy abuse with around 150 to 170 convictions.

In Norway, after revelations by Norwegian newspaper Adresseavisen, the Norwegian Church and the Vatican acknowledged bishop Georg Müller resigned in 2009 due to discoveries about his abuse of an altar boy two decades earlier; they were made aware of the incident, but did not alert the authorities, and the law did not allow criminal prosecution.

In Portugal, priest Frederico Cunha was convicted for the murder of 15-year-old Luís Correia, and four witnesses told the court that they were sexually abused by the priest. Bishop Teodoro de Faria protested the detention, described Cunha as "innocent like Jesus Christ." Cunha also said that he was a victim of injustice. In April 1988, Cunha escaped to Rio de Janeiro, and the sentence expired on 8 April 2018. A February 2023 report revealed that at least 4,815 children had been sexually abused by Portugal clergy since 1950.

==== Ireland ====
Beginning in the 1990s, a series of criminal cases and state inquiries in Ireland documented widespread abuse over several decades. State investigations found that tens of thousands of children suffered abuse in Church-run institutions from the 1940s to the 1990s. Reports also concluded that senior clergy had, in many instances, reassigned accused priests to new parishes rather than removing them from ministry and reporting them to secular authorities.

Several high-profile cases drew national attention. Micheál Ledwith resigned as President of St Patrick's College, Maynooth in 1994 following allegations of misconduct, and the 2005 McCullough Report criticized the inadequate response of Church authorities. Brendan Smyth was found to have abused children in Ireland and the United States between 1945 and 1989, and controversy over the priest's extradition contributed to the collapse of the Irish government in 1994. In 2010, Dublin priest Tony Walsh received a lengthy sentence for multiple offenses committed in the 1970s and 1980s.

By 2011, six priests had been convicted in cases reviewed by the National Board for Safeguarding Children in the Catholic Church. A 2018 list reported more than 1,300 clergy accused of abuse, with 82 convictions. In 2020, an independent review found that the Catholic Boy Scouts of Ireland and the Scout Association had, over several decades, failed to act on allegations involving 275 known or suspected abusers.

In Northern Ireland, the Historical Institutional Abuse Inquiry, which began in 2014, examined sexual and physical abuse of children in various institutions between 1922 and 1995, including both Catholic and non-Catholic homes. The De La Salle Brothers and the Sisters of Nazareth admitted to physical and sexual abuse in institutions they operated and issued apologies to victims. A 2017 report found that local police, who had also inadequately investigated abuse at the non-Catholic Kincora Boys' Home, had helped Catholic officials conceal reported abuse in four-Catholic run boys' homes in Belfast, which recorded the highest levels of abuse among the 22 institutions investigated.

==== Poland ====
In Poland, the public became concerned about reports of child sex abuse scandals and the poor response to it by the Polish Catholic Church. The Polish Church resisted paying compensation to victims and refused to publish sexual abuse data. Bishop Antoni Dydycz said priests should not rush to report abuse due to the seal of confession barring revealing confessions.

In September 2018, Bishop Romuald Kamiński apologized to victims, and said leaders were working on a document addressing abuse, the scale of it, and prevention. In early 2019, the document was still not public. In October 2018, a group of victims mapped out 255 cases of alleged sexual abuse in Poland.

In April 2019, the Episcopal Conference of Poland released data from 10,000 local parishes, finding abuse reports on 382 priests and 625 children sexually abused. Some commentors said that it could be an undercount of the actual numbers. With pressures from the Vatican, the Polish Church apologized and accepted the need to report abuses. In earlier cases, clergy were not required to notify the police, but only investigate themselves, and if necessary, inform the Vatican about the sexual abuse of minors.

By May 2019, Polak issued an apology as the documentary Tell No One, which presented multiple accounts of clerical abuse, drew millions of viewers online. The film highlighted cases such as Father Jan A., who admitted to abusing minors, and raised concerns about priests continuing to work with young people despite prior convictions. In response, the Polish government increased penalties for child sexual abuse and considered raising the age of consent from 15 to 16, but the second reform was not implemented. In June 2020, Pope Francis removed Bishop Edward Janiak from oversight of the Diocese of Kalisz while he was under investigation for protecting abusive priests, later accepting his resignation. Allegations also emerged involving Franciszek Cybula, former chaplain to Lech Wałęsa. In August 2020, Pope Francis removed Archbishop Sławoj Leszek Głódź, who had been accused of mishandling abuse cases linked to both priests.

In November 2020, the Vatican sanctioned Cardinal Henryk Gulbinowicz after an investigation into abuse allegations, barring him from public ministry and denying him cathedral burial rites. He died shortly afterward.

==== United Kingdom ====
In the United Kingdom, Cardinal Keith O'Brien resigned in 2013 due to allegations of inappropriate and predatory sexual conduct with priests and seminarians. In 2020, the Independent Inquiry into Child Sexual Abuse released a report stating that the England and Wales churches covered up allegations, as there was "no acknowledgement of any personality responsibility" by Vincent Nichols, a cardinal and the senior cleric in England and Wales since 2014. The report said he lacked compassion and cared more about the Church's reputation than the victims.

=== Oceania ===
The Catholic Church in Australia has faced extensive criticism for its handling of child sexual abuse cases. By 2011, more than one hundred priests had been charged, and by 2017 the Church had paid the equivalent of 276 million dollars in compensation to thousands of victims. Inquiries found that some Church officials, including Cardinal George Pell, had been aware of abuse for decades and failed to act appropriately. Popes John Paul II and Benedict XVI issued apologies for the abuse in Australia.

The Royal Commission into Institutional Responses to Child Sexual Abuse reported that seven percent of Catholic priests in Australia were "alleged perpetrators", and that nearly half of Catholic institutions examined had recorded cases of abuse. The commission documented 4,756 allegations from 4,444 victims involving 1,800 accused individuals, most of whom were priests or religious brothers. Survivors, including Amber Louise, criticized the Church's internal "Towards Healing" process for delaying or mishandling complaints. In 2019, the Church adopted National Catholic Safeguarding Standards aligned with the commission's recommendations.

In 2019, former priest Vincent Ryan received an additional prison sentence for offenses committed against altar boys. In 2020, Queensland enacted legislation requiring clergy to report child sexual abuse disclosed in confession, with deep penalties for noncompliance. That same year, the Royal Commission found that the Church had failed to act on earlier complaints against Marist Brother Thomas Butler, prompting an apology from the order's leadership.

== Comparison and causes ==
Scholars, commentators, and Church officials have proposed numerous explanations for clerical sexual abuse, but no single cause has achieved universal acceptance. Research consistently showcases that abuse occurs across many religious and secular institutions, and debates about causation often reflect broader questions about institutional culture, psychology, and social change.

=== Comparative context across institutions ===
Studies have found that sexual abuse is not unique to the Catholic Church; a 2002 report by Christian Ministry Resources noted that Protestant congregations had more allegations of child sexual abuse, with most offenders being volunteers rather than clergy. Based on data from Australia's Royal Commission, Gerald Henderson observed that Jehovah's Witnesses had significantly higher allegation rates than either the Catholic or Uniting churches. Within the Church, the John Jay College of Criminal Justice found that between 1950 and 2002, 4,392 priests and deacon were plausibly accused of abusing 10,667 minors—about 4 percent of clergy active during that period.

The Atlanta Journal‑Constitution noted parallels between religious and medical institutions, both of which often handled abuse internally and privately. In educational settings, Charol Shakeshaft reported that abuse occurs at substantially higher rates in schools than in churches, and Ernie Allen emphasized that the Catholic Church is not uniquely prone to abuse. A U.S. Department of Justice-funded study found that approximately 10 percent of K-12 students experience sexual misconduct by a school employee before graduation. Juris Magazine similarly reported proportionally higher rates of abuse by public school teachers and noted that abuse cases involving priests declined sharply after 2002 following the implementation of new safeguarding measures.

=== Institutional and structural factors ===
A recurring criticism is that Church authorities often failed to report allegations to civil authorities and instead reassigned accused clergy. Confessional secrecy, protected under canon law and recognized in many civil jurisdictions, has complicated reporting; several Australian archbishops told the Royal Commission they would not disclose confessional admissions of abuse. In the United States, investigations have found omissions in diocesan lists of accused clergy and documented cases in which credibly accused priests were transferred abroad after allegations surfaced.

Some analysts argue that a male-dominated Church structure and limited lay oversight contributed to a sense of inadequate accountability. Lucetta Scaraffia suggested that greater involvement of women in governance might have prevented some abuse, while other scholars note that abuse has also been committed by female religious institutions, indicating that gender alone does not fully explain the problem.

=== Clerical celibacy and seminary formation ===
Mandatory celibacy has been cited by some theologians, including Christoph Schönborn and Hans Küng, as a potential contributing factor. Others, such as Philip Jenkins, argue that rates of abuse are no higher among celibate Catholic clergy compared with clergy in other denominations.

The John Jay Report and the National Review Board identified shortcomings in seminary training—including inadequate screening, insufficient emotional support, and limited preparation for celibate life—as possible contributors. Vincent J. Miles suggested that aspects of mid‑twentieth‑century seminary culture may have increased vulnerability to abusive behavior.

=== Psychological and clinical considerations ===
During the mid-20th century, many bishops relied on prevailing psychological guidance that offenders could be treated and safely returned to ministry. Psychologist Thomas Plante noted that research on sexual abuse did not emerge "until the early 1980s", making such reassignments appear reasonable at the time, though they are now widely regarded as serious misjudgments and "tragic mistake[s]". Robert Bennett of the National Review Board identified excessive reliance on psychiatric evaluations as a major institutional failure, noting that roughly 40 percent of abusive priests received counseling before reassignment.

=== Sexual orientation and abuse patterns ===
Because most reported victims were male—81 percent according to the John Jay Report, and possibly higher according to Thomas Plante—some commentators have argued that homosexuality within the clergy is linked to abuse. However, multiple studies have found no statistical correlation between sexual orientation and the abuse of minors. The John Jay Institute concluded that most offenders identified as heterosexual and found "no statistical support" for a link between homosexuality and abuse. The New York Times reported that abuse cases decreased as more openly gay priests entered ministry.

=== Pedophilia, ephebophilia, and offender profiles ===
Research distinguishes between pedophilia (pre-pubescent victims) and ephebophilia (post-pubescent adolescents). Studies by Cimbolic, Cartor, and Tallon found that only a minority of clerical offenders met clinical criteria for pedophilia, with a larger population targeting adolescents. Thomas Plante, citing Stephen Joseph Rossetti, reported that roughly 2 percent of priests had sexual contact with a minor and that "80 to 90 percent" of cases involved adolescent boys, suggesting ephebophilia was more common.

The John Jay College's Causes and Context report classified relatively few offenders as pedophiles, though critics argued that its definition of pre-pubescent (ten or under) was narrower than the standard clinical definition (thirteen or under), which would increase the proportion of cases categorizing as pedophilia. In 2014, Pope Francis was quoted as saying that around 2 percent of clergy were pedophiles, though the Vatican later stated the interview was neither recorded nor transcribed and that the remarks were likely misattributed.

=== Cultural, moral, and historical explanations ===
Some commentators attribute the crisis to broader cultural shifts. Author George Weigel has linked it to a "culture of dissent" in the Church, while Cardinal Theodore McCarrick—later laicized for misconduct—attributed it to declining societal morals. The John Jay College found that rising abuse reports corresponded with cultural changes in the 1960s, though critics note that significant cases also occurred in the 1950s. Others point to priest shortages, arguing that dioceses may have been reluctant to remove clergy despite serious allegations.

In 2019, Pope Emeritus Benedict XVI suggested that moral relativism—specifically the belief that nothing is inherently good or evil—contributed to the crisis by leaving priests to make "only relative value judgments." This interpretation has been debated among theologians, with some viewing it as a partial explanation and others arguing that institutional factors played a more decisive role. Some said that his letter undercut the authority of Pope Francis and that his letter did not help to solve the abuse issues.

== Institutional responses ==
The Catholic Church's response to clerical sexual abuse has developed at diocesan, episcopal conference, and Vatican levels. For much of the 20th century, allegations were handled independently by individual bishops, a decentralized structure that Thomas Plante described as "a fairly flat" system in which each bishop decided how to respond, sometimes effectively and sometimes "very poorly." Accused clergy could face resignation, laicization, imprisonment, or supervised residence when canonical removal was not possible.

=== 1962-2001: Canonical norms and early handling of allegations ===
In 1962, the Holy Office issued Crimen sollicitationis, which set procedures for handling cases in which clerics used the confessional to make sexual advances; the same procedures were applied to accusations of homosexual, pedophilic, or zoophilic acts by clergy and reiterated automatic excommunication for failing to report solicitation in confession within one month. The 1983 Code of Canon Law explicitly defined sexual acts with minors by clerics as a canonical crime punishable by dismissal from the clerical state (canon 1395 §2). According to De delictis gravioribus, Crimen sollicitationis remained in force until 2001.

Throughout much of the 20th century, dioceses commonly referred accused priests to psychiatric treatment rather than reporting allegations to civil authorities; nearly 40 percent of accused priests underwent such treatment. Many bishops then reassigned these priests to new parishes, allowing continued contact with children. According to the United States Conference of Catholic Bishops (USCCB), earlier Church leaders often viewed abuse primarily as a spiritual or psychological problem rather than a criminal offense, believing it required prayer, counseling, or rehabilitation rather than just removal from ministry, utilizing treatment centers. Critic Paul Isley argued that research on clergy offenders was limited and that claims of treatment success lacked empirical support.

In Ireland, the State issued its first formal apology in 1999, acknowledging failures to protect children in Church-run institutions. A major inquiry completed in 2009 documented widespread physical and sexual abuse across more than 250 institutions and found that government inspectors had not intervened to stop systematic mistreatment. Subsequent investigations, including the Ferns Report and the Murphy Report, concluded that both Church and State structures had facilitated cover-ups by failing to report allegations to civil authorities.

In 2001, Pope John Paul II issued Sacramentorum sanctitatis tutela, classifying sexual abuse of a minor by a cleric as a delictum gravius and placing all such cases under the authority of the Congregation for the Doctrine of the Faith (CDF), which could impose penalties up to dismissal from the clerical state. A CDF guide clarified that dioceses must investigative allegations, follow civil reporting laws, and refer cases with any "semblance of truth" to the CDF, while bishops retained authority to restrict a priest's ministry to protect minors.

=== 2002–2009: U.S. reforms, global scrutiny, and declining cases ===
The revelations published by The Boston Globe in 2002 prompted a decisive shift in the United States. The USCCB adopted a coordinated national policy; John L. Allen Jr. noted that the bishops called for "swift, sure, and final punishment" for guilty clergy, while the Vatican cautioned against "railroading priests who may or may not be guilty". The John Jay Report later concluded that allegations were often reported decades after the incidents and identified systemic failures, including avoidance of scandal, reliance on unqualified treatment centers, reassignment of known offenders, and insufficient accountability among bishops.

After Cardinal Bernard Law resigned as Archbishop of Boston in 2002 after documents indicated he had failed to address abuse in the archdiocese, his successor, Archbishop Seán P. O'Malley, oversaw the sale of archdiocesan properties to help fund settlements.

In 2002, the USCCB implemented a zero-tolerance policy with the Charter for the Protection of Children and Young People, committing the Church to creating a "safe environment" for minors. The Charter required background checks for Church personnel, mandatory reporting of allegations to civil authorities, internal investigations, and removal of credibly accused clergy. By 2008, the Church reported training 5.8 million children in abuse-prevention programs and conducting extensive screening of volunteers and employees. The USCCB's National Review Board requires dioceses to notify civil authorities when a minor is allegedly abused, investigate the claim, and remove from ministry any cleric who is found guilty or admits guilty; it also commissioned John Jay College to study the nature, scope, and financial impact of abuse cases in the U.S. Church.

In parallel, the Vatican required background checks for all Church personnel in the United States who work with children; millions of volunteers and employees, along with tens of thousands of clerics and seminarians, were screened. Pope John Paul II stated that there is no place in the Church for anyone "who would harm the young." A Vatican conference featuring external psychiatric experts expressed concern that rigid zero-tolerance policies lacked flexibility; one said that it was "overkill."

Numerous dioceses in the United States have faced large civil settlements related to clerical abuse; major agreements included 25.7 million dollars paid by the Archdiocese of Louisville in 2003, 85 million dollars paid by the Archdiocese of Boston that same year, and settlements in Portland, Seattle, and Denver between 2007 and 2008 totaling more than 125 million dollars. Several dioceses, including Tucson, Spokane, Portland, Davenport, and San Diego, sought bankruptcy protection in response to large numbers of claims, and by 2011 eight dioceses had filed for bankruptcy.

Legal and doctrinal controversies also emerged. A lawsuit filed in Kentucky accused the Vatican of covering up abuse dating back to 1928. In 2005, Pope Benedict XVI was named in a U.S. lawsuit alleging involvement in covering up abuse by a priest in Texas; he obtained immunity as head of the Holy See. That same year, the Vatican issued Criteria for the Discernment of Vocation for Persons with Homosexual Tendencies, barring the ordination of men with "deep-seated homosexual tendencies." The document was widely viewed in the context of the abuse crisis and drew criticism from some Catholic groups for appearing to link homosexuality with abuse, while the U.S. National Review Board highlighted the predominance of adolescent male victims in its analysis.

A 2006 CARA study found strong lay support for reporting allegations to civil authorities (78 percent) and removing credibly accused clergy (76 percent).

In 2007, Archbishop Csaba Ternyak, secretary of the Congregation for Clergy, raised questions about rehabilitation and risk assessment of offenders, asking which treatment methods were effective and how to identify those at risk of reoffending. He observed that many priests who had never been accused felt stigmatized and believed their rights were not adequately protected, and he noted that "more than a few" accused priests had died by suicide.

In 2008, Pope Benedict XVI stated that he was "deeply ashamed", pledged that pedophiles would not be priests, and apologized for abuse scandals in Australia. That same year, a U.S. Court of Appeals in Cincinnati denied the Vatican's claim of sovereign immunity, allowing a lawsuit by three men alleging abuse to proceed; the Vatican did not appeal.

By 2009, researchers reported that clerical abuse cases had "steeply declined" after 1985 and that Church responses had shifted over several decades, with suspension becoming more common than reinstatement. In a statement to the UN Human Rights Council that year, Archbishop Silvano Maria Tomasi suggested that abusive clergy should be described as exhibiting "ephebophilia," claiming that "80 to 90 percent" of abusive priests fell into this category. Margaret Smith and Karen Terry, researchers for the John Jay Report, cautioned that equating abuse of boys with homosexuality was "an unwarranted conclusion," noting that participation in same-sex acts is not the same as a gay sexual identity and that their data did not show a link between homosexual identity and a higher likelihood of abuse. Empirical studies similarly find that sexual orientation does not determine the risk of abusing children and that many child molesters cannot be classified by an adult sexual orientation.

The financial impact on the Church grew rapidly, with total costs rising from an estimated 500 million dollars in the late 1990s to more than 2.6 billion dollars by 2009; this included jury awards, settlements, and legal fees. In 2007 alone, Catholic institutions spent approximately 615 million dollars on abuse-related expenses, leading some dioceses to reduce operating budgets, close properties, and transfer assets to reduce available funds for compensation after bankruptcy. Some of these transfers received approval from the Vatican.

During this period, other national responses developed. In the United Kingdom, the 2001 Lord Nolan recommendations became a model for bishop' conferences; each parish was to appoint a lay safeguarding officer responsible for vetting those with access to vulnerable persons and serving as a contact point for concerns. in the Philippines, the Catholic Bishops’ Conference of the Philippines issued a public apology for clerical misconduct over the previous two decades, and Archbishop Orlando Quevo stated that nearly 200 of the country's 7,000 priests may have committed "sexual misconduct including child abuse, homosexuality and affairs; in 2011, Bishop Juan de Dios Pueblos was criticized for sheltering a priest accused of abusing a minor rather than turning him over to civil or Church authorities.

=== 2010–2014: Global guidelines and new structures ===
In April 2010, the Vatican faced heightened scrutiny. During a visit to Chile, Cardinal Tarcisio Bertone linked clerical abuse to homosexuality, prompting widespread criticism. Vatican spokesman Federico Lombardi clarified that Bertone's remark exceeded Church teaching and noted that about 10 percent of cases involved pedophilia in the strict sense, while most involved adolescents. Giovanni Maria Vian, editor of L’Osservatore Romano, argued that some media criticism reflected commercial motives "to sell newspapers." Pope Benedict XVI stated that the Church "must do penance for abuse cases."

Msgr. Charles Scicluna explained that few cases reached the CDF before 1985, leading to jurisdictional uncertainty after the 1983 Code of Canon Law; he noted that after the 2001 motu proprio, the CDF handled approximately "three thousand cases of diocesan and religious priests" involving crimes committed over the previous fifty years. In March 2010, Benedict issued a pastoral letter to abuse survivors in Ireland, acknowledging that "nothing can undo the wrong you have endured," though critics argued the letter did not address systematic issues within the Church In June 2010, the Vatican extended the statute of limitations for canonical trials involving minors and streamlined procedures for removing abusive clergy, although some observers viewed the global norms as less stringent than existing U.S. policies.

In 2011, the Vatican published new guidelines requiring dioceses and religious orders to develop "clear and coordinated" procedures for handling allegations by 2012. The guidelines instructed bishops to cooperate with civil authorities and respect local laws, but reporting was not mandatory and bishops retained significant discretion; critics argued that the guidelines lacked "specific enforcement mechanisms." On 22 March 2014, Pope Francis created the Pontifical Commission for the Protection of Minors to advise on safeguarding policies, appointing Cardinal Sean P. O'Malley as its head. In November 2014, Pope Francis laicized and excommunicated Argentine priest José Mercau following confirmed abuse.

The 2011 John Jay Report found a sharp decline in abuse beginning in the 1980s and continuing through the 1990s and 2000s, nothing "continuing very low levels" of new cases in the early twenty-first century. Most allegations reported today concern incidents from the 1950s and 1960s, and fewer than 2 percent involve priests ordained after 1989.

At the international level, the United Nations Committee on the Rights of the Child reported in 2014 that the Holy See had not taken sufficient measures to address clerical abuse and had adopted practices that contributed to impunity; a joint statement asserted that "cases of child sexual abuse have hardly ever been reported" because of a binding "code of silence imposed on all members" with the "penalty of excommunication" imposed. The committee found that abusive clergy were often reassigned without police notification, that bishops were not required to report allegations to civil authorities, and that some known offenders retained access to children. The report prompted global debate about transparency within Church governance; although the report addressed issues beyond abuse, it increased pressure on the Vatican to strengthen reporting protocols and institutional safeguards.

In 2014, the Holy See reported to the United Nations Committee against Torture that 3,420 cases of abuse involving minors had been investigated over the previous decade and that 884 priests had been removed from ministry. The United States has the highest number of reported cases, followed by Ireland, with significant numbers also documented in Australia, New Zealand, Canada, Europe, Latin America, Africa, and Asia. In 2017, Pope Francis acknowledged a backlog of approximately 2,000 cases awaiting review.

=== 2018–2024: Universal norms and Vatican City legislation ===
At the beginning of 2018, Pope Francis initially rejected reports of widespread clerical abuse in Chile. Following public outcry, he ordered an investigation that resulted in all Chilean bishops submitting their resignations, although only some were ultimately accepted. Later that year, as abuse scandals emerged in several countries—including a Pennsylvania report identifying more than 300 priests plausibly accused over five decades—Francis expressed "shame" at the findings, though he did not announce specific disciplinary measures for offenders or those involved in cover-ups.

From 21 to 24 February 2019, the Vatican hosted the Meeting on the Protection of Minors in the Church, bringing together the presidents of episcopal conferences to address global safeguarding standards. In March 2019, Pope Francis issued the apostolic letter Communis Vita, amending canon law to require the dismissal of religious members who are absent and unreachable for twelve months, a measure intended to prevent clergy from disappearing or being transferred without oversight.

On 26 March 2019, Pope Francis introduced three measures specific to Vatican City: Vatican Law No. CCXCVII on the protection of minors and vulnerable persons, a motu proprio extending these norms to the Roman Curia, and Guidelines for the Vicariate of Vatican City. Andrea Tornielli described the documents as "very specific laws" tailored to Vatican City but reflecting "advanced international parameters." Vatican Law No. CCXCVII requires Vatican officials, including Curial staff and diplomatic personnel, to report allegations of abuse; penalties for failing to report include fines or, for Vatican gendarmes, imprisonment. The law allows prosecution ex officio, extends the statute of limitations to twenty years from a victim's eighteenth birthday, and mandates support services for victims through the Vatican's Department of Health and Welfare.

The accompanying motu proprio extends these obligations to all Curial personnel and requires verification of a candidate's suitability to work with minors, while the Guidelines for the Vicariate of Vatican City apply to clergy, religious, and educators within Vatican territory, requiring that pastoral activities with minors occur in visible settings and prohibiting preferential relationships, offensive or suggestive behavior, secrecy requests, and photographing or filming minors without parental consent; the Vicar of Vatican City must report any credible allegation to the Promoter of Justice and remove the accused from ministry as a precaution.

On 9 May 2019, Pope Francis promulgated the motu proprio Vos estis lux mundi, requiring all clerics and members of religious institutes—including bishops—to report allegations of sexual abuse or cover-ups. The law mandates that every diocese establish a stable reporting system and that metropolitan archbishops submit regular updates to the Holy See, with investigations normally completed within ninety days unless an extension is granted. Canon law scholar Kurt Martens described this reform as a "rare gift to the entire church" that helps "bring about a change in attitude and...in law".

On 17 December 2019, Pope Francis issued the instruction On the confidentiality of legal proceedings, removing the pontifical secret from cases involving sexual abuse of minors or vulnerable persons, abuse of authority to coerce sexual acts, and the concealment of such crimes. The instruction maintains confidentiality to protect the privacy and reputation of those involved but allows appropriate sharing of information with civil authorities; Archbishop Juan Ignacio Arrieta clarified that lifting the pontifical secret "does not mean that it provides the freedom to make [information] public," and the sacramental seal of confession remains fully intact. The document states that professional secrecy must not prevent compliance with civil laws, including mandatory reporting and court orders. Giuseppe Dalla Torre noted that removing papal secrecy "promot[es] full cooperation with the civil authorities" while respecting the boundaries between civil and canonical jurisdictions; Archbishop Charles Scicluna added that trial documents are "not public domain" but may be shared with authorities who have statutory jurisdiction, following the "formalities of international law".

=== 2025–present: Recent papal engagement with survivors ===
While serving as a bishop before his election, Pope Leo XIV publicly encouraged victims to report abuse and criticized secrecy in handling allegations. Some critics have alleged that he mishandled certain cases during his tenure in Chiclayo, including claims in one instance that he "never actually investigated the case" of an abusive priest who "was moved to another clergy and was still able to practice."

As pope, Leo XIV has adopted a more direct and visible approach to engaging with survivors and advocacy groups. In October 2025, he met with "four victims and two advocates with Ending Clergy Abuse," a global organization of abuse victims and activists," marking a departure from earlier papal practice in which advocacy groups were often kept at arm's length even when individual survivors were received. Around the same time, he met with "15 survivors of clergy sexual abuse," a meeting that concluded with "an intense moment of prayer." In November 2025, he received a group of abuse survivors from Belgium in a separate audience. In early 2026, he stated that the door of the Church had been "closed and the victims were not welcomed," adding that the Church "cannot close our eyes nor our hearts."

On 2 February 2026, Leo XIV received David Ryan, an Irish survivor of clerical abuse at Blackrock College in County Dublin, a school run by the Congregation of the Holy Spirit. Ryan, who had previously spoken publicly about the abuse he and his late brother suffered, said after the meeting that the pope "felt my pain" and described him as "a lovely, lovely man," reporting that Leo XIV apologized for the abuse and expressed shock at his account.

Pope Leo XIV has also publicized meetings with journalists who have tried to identify abuse and other crimes. In March 2026, Leo XIV met with an investigative journalist who criticized the Catholic organization Opus Dei as an abusive organization. Leo XIV also highlighted that there are many adults who are vulnerable in the Church.

== Institutional perception ==
The Catholic Church's handling of the abuse crisis has significantly affected its public reputation, image, and likeness, prompting a wide range of responses from victims, media, and governmental authorities. Scholars and commentators have also proposed theories to explain why the Church experienced such as high incidence of abuse cases.

Failure to prevent abuse and canonical competence

Scholars, journalists, and survivor advocates have long argued that institutional failures contributed significantly to the scale of clerical abuse. In 2010, the BBC reported that the crisis was driven largely by cover-ups and failures in how Church leaders handled allegations, with particular criticism directed at the actions of some bishops. That same year, Pope Benedict XVI acknowledged that the Church had not been adequately vigilant or prompt in responding to abuse and stated that approximately 400 priests had been laicized over a two-year period.

Advocacy groups such as the Survivors Network of those Abused by Priests (SNAP) and the Center for Constitutional Rights contended that Church authorities, including Benedict, had prioritized institutional reputation over child safety and had participated in concealing crimes. Abuse survivor Mary Dispenza similarly argued that abuse "still lives on today"; some bishops withhold information, resulting in stalled cases. She called for decisive action from the Church to ensure that child protection took precedence over institutional concerns. In June 2021, United Nations special rapporteurs criticized the Vatican for what they described as insufficient cooperation with national judicial authorities and inadequate mechanisms for accountability and redress. A Vatican spokesman stated that cases involving national churches did not fall under the direct "competence of the Holy See." Critics, including journalist James Carroll, argued that this position conflicted with canons 331 and 333 of the 1983 Code of Canon Law, which affirm the pope's "full, immediate, and universal" authority over the Church. Silvano Tomasi, the Holy See's representative to the United Nations, argued that "priests are citizens of their own states, and they fall under the jurisdiction of their own country." A UN report disagreed, noting that priests are "bound by obedience to the pope" and urging the Vatican to require reporting to civil authorities and to end a "code of silence" that discouraged whistleblowers.

=== Transparency, secrecy, and Crimen sollicitationis ===
Critics have argued that assigning abuse cases to the Congregation for the Doctrine of the Faith (CDF) increased secrecy and slowed responses. David Yallop claimed that the backlog of cases was so large that mere replies could take more than a year. Vatican officials later acknowledged that confidentiality had sometimes been interpreted as discouraging cooperation with civil authorities. In 2010, Cardinal Claudio Hummes stated that abuse by priests constituted "criminal facts" requiring collaboration with civil justice. Scholar Lucetta Scaraffia described past secrecy as a form of omertà and suggested that greater female involvement in Church governance might have reduced it.

The 1962 instruction Crimen sollicitationis, which outlined procedures for handling cases involving misuse of the confessional, was interpreted by some as a directive to keep abuse allegations secret. Attorney Daniel Shea argued that it demonstrated an "international conspiracy to hush up sex abuse issues". The Vatican responded that the document had been misinterpreted and had been superseded by later norms, particularly the 1983 Code of Canon Law.

=== Handling of accused clergy and non-removal ===
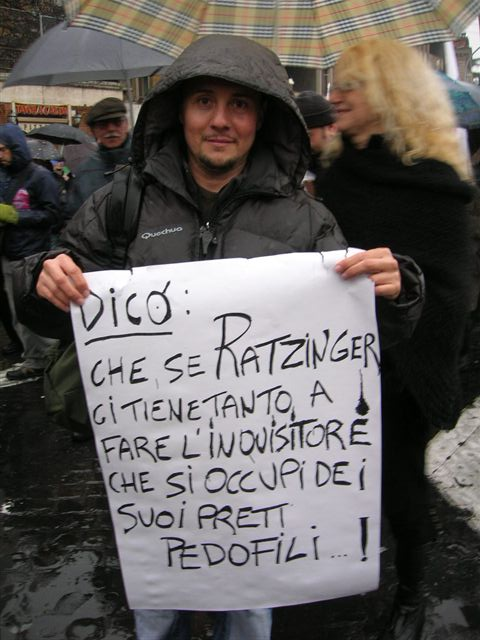
Rome, 2007. March organized by Facciamo Breccia against the interference of the Catholic Church in Italian Politics. The placard says: If Ratzinger really wants to play inquisitor that much, why doesn't he go deal with his pedophile priests?

The Catholic hierarchy has been criticized for responding too slowly and inconsistency to allegations of clerical misconduct. Cardinal Roger Mahony stated that earlier Church leaders "didn't realize how serious this was," which contributed to transferring accused priests rather than removing them from ministry. Gerald Fitzgerald, founder of the Servants of the Paraclete, was an early critic of returning abusive priests to ministry. He concluded that many offenders could not be rehabilitated and urged bishops and Vatican officials to laicize them. Fitzgerald opposed later efforts to introduce psychological treatment at his center and maintained his position until his death in 1969.

Bishop Manuel D. Moreno of Tucson sought for years to have two abusive priests laicized, writing to Cardinal Joseph Ratzinger in 1997 after one priest had been suspended and convicted in Church proceedings. Both priests were eventually laicized in 2004. Moreno had been criticized for inaction until his efforts became public. Bishop Blase J. Cupich later explained that Fitzgerald's warnings "went largely unheeded" because abusive cases were thought to be rare, his proposals were viewed as extreme, and psychological research at the time suggested that treatment could allow some offenders to return safely to ministry—an assumption bishops "came to regret."

In 2010, some critics called for Pope Benedict XVI's resignation, alleging that he had previously blocked efforts to remove an abusive priest. Benedict resigned in 2013, citing declining health. In 2012, Monsignor William Lynn of the Archdiocese of Philadelphia was convicted of endangering the welfare of a child for his role in handling abuse allegations, becoming the first U.S. Church official convicted for covering up clerical abuse.

=== Secrecy among bishops and internal disagreements ===
The Boston Globe reported that some bishops arranged compensation for victims on the condition that allegations remain confidential. In 2009, the Irish Commission to Inquire into Child Abuse concluded that the Dublin Archdiocese had prioritized "secrecy, the avoidance of scandal, the protection of the reputation of the Church, and the preservation of its assets" for decades, subordinating "the welfare of children and justice for victims."

In 2010, Christopher Hitchens and Richard Dawkins called for legal action against Pope Benedict XVI for allegedly covering up abuse. That same year, a lawsuit filed in U.S. federal court accused Benedict and other Vatican officials of concealing cases to avoid scandal. In 2011, two German lawyers submitted a complaint to the International Criminal Court alleging a "strong suspicion" that Benedict, as head of the CDF, had protected abusive clergy.

Internal disagreements also became public. Cardinal Christoph Schönborn stated that Cardinal Angelo Sodano had blocked an investigation led by then-Cardinal Ratzinger in the mid-1990s. In France, Bishop Pierre Pican received a suspended sentence for failing to report an abusive priest; Cardinal Darío Castrillón Hoyos defended Pican and later said he had Pope John Paul II's approval. Hoyos and the Congregation for the Clergy were again criticized in 2011 for opposing 1997 Irish guidelines requiring all allegations to be reported to police, which Archbishop Diarmuid Martin described as "disastrous."

A 2019 Washington Post investigation reported that former Cardinal Theodore McCarrick had distributed approximately US$600,000 in Church funds to Vatican officials, papal advisers, and two popes beginning in 2001. Some recipients were involved in evaluating misconduct allegations against him.

In November 2020, the Holy See's Secretariat of State released a report on McCarrick. It stated that Pope John Paul II had been informed of allegations but did not find them credible, and that Pope Benedict XVI, despite receiving additional complaints, took limited action to restrict McCarrick's activities. The report concluded that Pope Francis was not responsible for McCarrick's advancement and attributed responsibility primarily to decisions made during the pontificates of John Paul II and Benedict XVI.

=== Media coverage and works ===
Media coverage has played a central role in exposing abuse within the Catholic Church. Sinéad O'Connor's 1992 protest on Saturday Night Live, in which she tore a photograph of Pope John Paul II, drew both strong criticism and support and later received renewed attention as public awareness of abuse increased.

Some commentors argue that intense media focus has created a public perception that abuse is more prevalent among Catholic clergy than data supports. A Wall Street Journal-NBC News poll found that 64 percent of respondents believed Catholic priests "frequently" abused children, despite research showing no higher rate of offending among priests compared with other adult men. Philip Jenkins described some coverage as "a gross efflorescence of anti-Catholic rhetoric."

In 2002, revelations of widespread abuse in the United States received sustained coverage; The New York Times published 255 articles in the first 100 days, with 26 front-page stories. The Boston Globe's investigation, led by Walter V. Robinson, earned the Pulitzer Prize for Public Service. In Ireland, television journalism similarly increased public awareness of systemic abuse. The BBC documentary Sex Crimes and the Vatican highlighted claims about secrecy in Church procedures and referenced the 2005 Ferns Report.

Tom Hoopes noted that in early 2002, 61 major California newspapers published more than 2,000 stories on Catholic abuse cases but only four on a larger, ongoing abuse problem in public schools. Psychologist Thomas Plante similarly observed that media attention has contributed to misconceptions, though he noted that the Church's historical defensiveness may have intensified scrutiny.

A Pew Research Center study found that media attention in 2002 focused primarily on the United States, shifting largely to Europe by 2018.

Memoirs and nonfiction works addressing abuse include Andrew Madden's Altar Boy, Carolyn Lehman's Strong at the Heart, Larry Kelly's The Pigeon House, and Kathy O'Beirne's Kathy's Story. Journalist Ed West has questioned the accuracy of O'Beirne's account, citing Hermann Kelly's Kathy's Real Story.

Abuse in Church-run institutions has also been depicted in several films and documentary. The Magdalene Sisters (2002) dramatized abuses in Irish Magdalene laundries; Deliver Us From Evil (2006) examined the case of a single abusive priest and institutional responses; and the Irish documentary Suffer the Children (1994) addressed similar issues. A regularly updated list of related films and documentaries is maintained in the "Literature List Clergy Sexual Abuse."

== List of related topics ==
Sexual abuse cases

- Settlements and bankruptcies in Catholic sex abuse cases
- Catholic Church sexual abuse cases by country
- Catholic Church sexual abuse cases in Australia
- Catholic Church sexual abuse cases in Belgium
- Catholic Church sexual abuse cases in Canada
- Catholic Church sexual abuse cases in Chile
- Catholic Church sexual abuse cases in Dublin
- Catholic Church sexual abuse cases in Europe
- Catholic Church sexual abuse cases in the English Benedictine Congregation
- Catholic Church sexual abuse cases in Ireland
- Catholic Church sexual abuse cases in New Zealand
- Catholic Church sex abuse cases in the United States
- Sexual abuse in the Congregation of the Society of Mary (Marists)

Critique and consequences

- Criticism of Pope John Paul II
- Debate on the causes of clerical child abuse
- Ecclesiastical response to Catholic sexual abuse cases
- Instruction Concerning the Criteria for the Discernment of Vocations with Regard to Persons with Homosexual Tendencies in View of Their Admission to the Seminary and to Holy Orders
- Media coverage of Catholic sex abuse cases
- Sex Crimes and the Vatican, a BBC documentary
- Survivors Network of those Abused by Priests

Investigation, prevention, and victim support

- Broken Rites Australia, a support and advocacy group in Australia
- National Review Board, USA
- National Society for the Prevention of Cruelty to Children, UK
- Pontifical Commission for the Protection of Minors
- Sexual Addiction & Compulsivity, a peer-reviewed journal on prevention & treatment
- Virtus (program), a church initiative in the USA
- Vos estis lux mundi, a church procedure for combating sexual abuse
