= Independent Commission for the Study of Sexual Abuse against Children in the Portuguese Catholic Church =

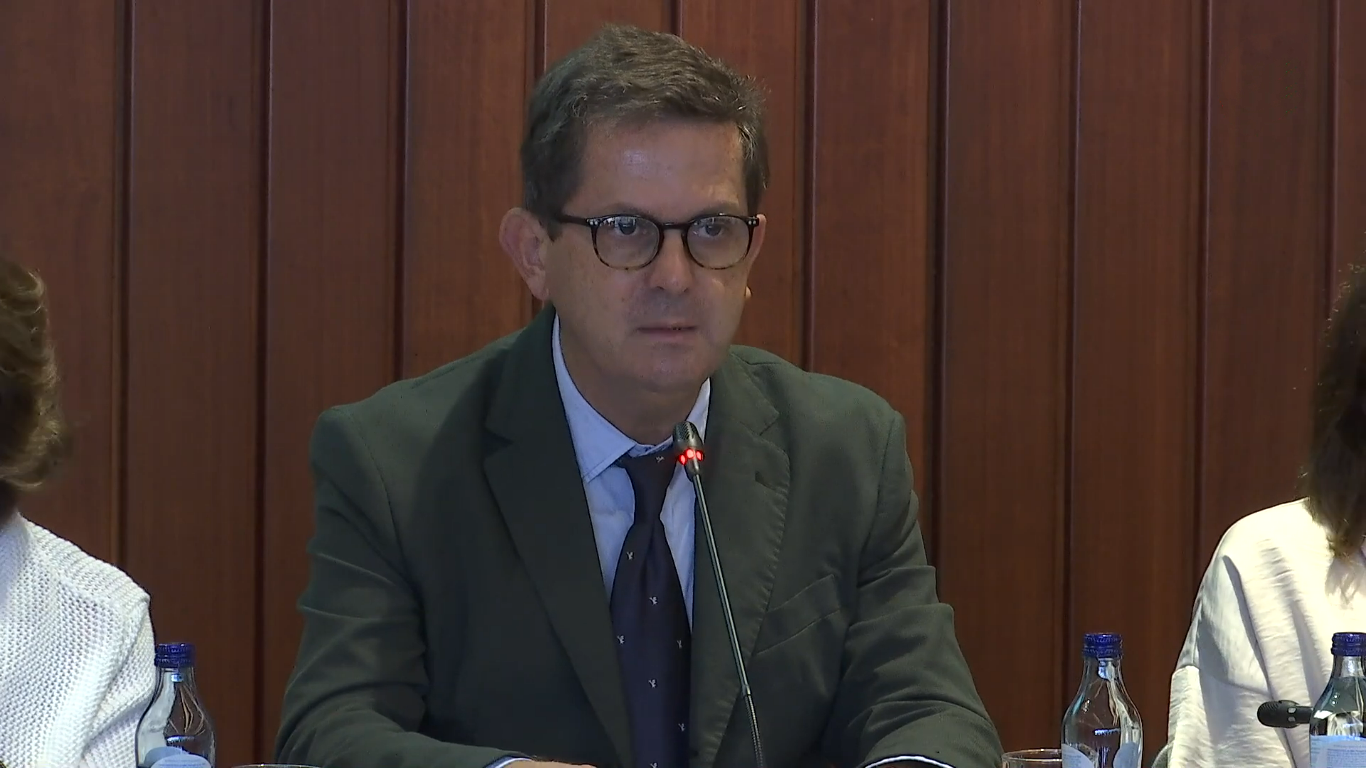
Pedro Strecht, coordinator of the Independent Commission

The Independent Commission for the Study of Sexual Abuse of Children in the Portuguese Catholic Church was an independent working group, which was created following an invitation addressed to pediatric psychiatrist Pedro Strecht, at the end of 2021, by Bishop José Ornelas, president of the Portuguese Episcopal Conference (CEP), to carry out a study on practices of sexual abuse of minors within the Portuguese Catholic Church, covering the period between 1950 and 2022.

It began its work in January 2022, with a team chosen by Pedro Strecht, defining a period of one year as its duration, with the final presentation of a report.

The commission is made up of a central nucleus of five people from different professional areas, to which another member is added as an external observer. They are: Pedro Strecht, Coordinator (pediatric psychiatrist), Ana Nunes de Almeida (sociologist, researcher in the area of childhood, family and school), Daniel Sampaio (psychiatrist, full professor), Álvaro Laborinho Lúcio (Supreme Court justice), Filipa Tavares (social assistant), and Catarina Vasconcelos, external member (anthropologist, filmmaker). The commission also included the participation of Vasco Ramos (sociologist), Ana Sofia Varela (clinical psychologist) and Catarina Pires (journalist).

To study the Church Archives, an historian, Francisco Azevedo Mendes was invited. He independently formed the Historical Research Group (GIH) with three other researchers: Júlia Garraio (specialist in gender studies), and Rita Almeida de Carvalho and Sérgio Ribeiro Pinto (historians).

== Methodology ==
The decision to create a Study Commission for sexual abuse committed by members of the Catholic Church, in November 2021, followed instructions from Pope Francis in 2019, defending “zero tolerance” towards situations of sexual abuse of children. These principles had already led to the creation, in that same year, of twenty-one Diocesan Commissions, made up of professionals from various areas and, at the beginning of 2022, of a National Coordination of the same, chaired by the judge advisor José Souto de Moura .

The Independent Commission made the fundamental methodological choice of placing the victims at the center of its study, encouraging them to testify and giving them a voice.

The Commission designated the various forms of victims' participation as "testimonies" and excluded the use of the word "complaint", which presupposed a judicial reading that was not present in the field of its work.

The Commission prepared a questionnaire, placed online (for self-completion or completion with the help of a member of the Commission) and provided a telephone line (where anyone could call and give testimony or information) and conducted in-person interviews.

The Church's historical archives were researched, looking for and studying existing documentation on sexual abuse of children between 1950 and 2022 by members of the Church, in order to understand how the ecclesiastical structure had dealt with the occurrence of these crimes. Diocesan bishops and superiors of Portuguese religious institutes were also interviewed, in order to reconstruct their biographies and formative and spiritual trajectories and the way they viewed the problem of sexual abuse in the Church.

== Conclusions ==
On February 13, 2023, the Independent Commission released, in a session at the Calouste Gulbenkian Foundation, in Lisbon, a report with the conclusions of the work carried out throughout 2022 and which resulted in the collection of hundreds of testimonies from victims: 512 testimonies were received validated, based on which "a minimum number" of 4,815 victims were identified.

The report, however, states that the data found in ecclesiastical archives regarding the incidence of sexual abuse should be understood as "the tip of the iceberg". The Historical Research Group (GIH) only had access to the ecclesiastical archives in October 2022, and so many documents remained to be studied. Access had to be granted by special Vatican authorizations.

In 52% of cases, victims only revealed the abuse they suffered an average of 10 years after it occurred and in 43% of cases this complaint only happened when they contacted the Commission.

In 77% of cases, victims never filed a complaint with the Church and only in 4% of cases was a judicial complaint filed.

The Commission sent 25 cases to the Public Prosecutor's Office out of the 512 validated testimonies received throughout the year, even though the majority of these cases have already expired. The statute of limitations of cases, on the one hand, and anonymity on the other, are the main reasons for this reduced number of cases handed over to Justice.

The 1960s, 70s and 80s were those that recorded a greater number of cases of sexual abuse within the Church in Portugal.

Many cases have remained unidentified, as in diocesan archives, in particular, there is “the ambiguity that characterizes a significant part of ecclesiastical correspondence from the 20th century”. “The problem of sexual abuse is often not explicitly mentioned,” says the report.

The average age of the victims was, at the time of the release of the report, around 52 years old. 52.7% were men, 47.2% were women and 88.5% were residents of mainland Portugal, mainly in the districts of Lisbon, Porto, Braga, Setúbal and Leiria, but the abuses are spread throughout the country. Of those abused, 53% continue to claim to be Catholic and 25.8% are practicing Catholics.

The percentage of graduates among victims of abuse is 32.4%, while 12.9% are postgraduates.

As children, 58.6% of those abused who testified lived with their parents, 1/5 were institutionalized, while 7.8% belonged to single-parent families.

Almost all of the abusers of victims contacted by the Independent Commission were men and mostly priests. 97% of abusers were men and in 77% of cases they were priests, and in 47% of cases the abuser was part of the child's close relationships. The profile of abusers is varied, with a predominance of young adults with psychopathological structures, aggravated by risk factors such as alcoholism or poor impulse control.

Male victims suffered mainly from “anal sex, manipulation of sexual organs and masturbation”, while women suffered, in most cases, from “insinuation”.

Abuse occurred mainly between 10 and 14 years of age (the average was 11.2 years, 11.7 for boys and 10.5 for girls), 57.2% were abused more than once and 27.5% reported that they had been victims for more than a year. In the case of boys, in 77% of cases the abuser was a priest.

Most of the abuse occurred in seminaries (23%), in the church - in various places, including the altar - (18.8%), in the confessional (14.3%), in the rectory (12.9%) and in Catholic schools (6.9%).

The Independent Commission recognizes that “it is usually the victims [of abuse] who initiate the silencing, due to feelings of fear, shame and guilt”.

In later stages of adult life, “psychological and/or psychiatric support is necessary to intervene in various clinical conditions, such as anxiety and depressive mood disorders linked to post-traumatic stress situations ”, added the Commission.

The Independent Commission recommended that the Church create a new commission to continue studying and monitoring the topic, with members internal and external to the Church.

Furthermore, it recommends “the recognition, by the Church, of the existence and extent of the problem and commitment to its adequate future prevention”, namely through “compliance with the concept of 'zero tolerance' proposed by Pope Francis”.

The adoption of the “moral duty of reporting by the Church and collaboration with the Public Prosecutor's Office in cases of alleged crimes of sexual abuse”, the “effective request for forgiveness regarding situations that occurred in the past and their materialization”, as well as the “ ongoing and external training and supervision of members of the Church, particularly in the area of sexuality (their own and that of children and adolescents)”, are other recommendations that the commission leaves to the Church hierarchy.

“Continued psychological support for past, current and future victims” is also seen as a responsibility of the Church, in conjunction with the National Health Service .

The Independent Commission suggests that the statute of limitations for crimes of abuse be increased to the victim's 30th birthday, asking the Assembly of the Republic to change the law.

Other recommendations to civil society include the “carrying out of a national study on sexual abuse of children in their various socialization spaces”, the “unequivocal recognition of the Rights of the Child”, the “empowerment of children and families on the topic: the role of School”, the “increase in the age of the victim for the purpose of prescribing crimes” and the “speed of assessment and response from the justice system”.

The working group also highlights the need to “strengthen the role of social communication in research and treatment of the topic” and “increase emotional literacy on the true needs of child and youth development, especially in the affective and sexual field”.

In general, says the Commission, the Portuguese Catholic hierarchy “is in favor” of Pope Francis' position in condemning abuse.

The Commission decided that at the end of the work, a list of alleged abusers, still active, would be sent to the Public Ministry and the Portuguese Episcopal Conference, for appropriate analysis, recommending, however, maximum respect for secrecy.

== Reactions to the report ==
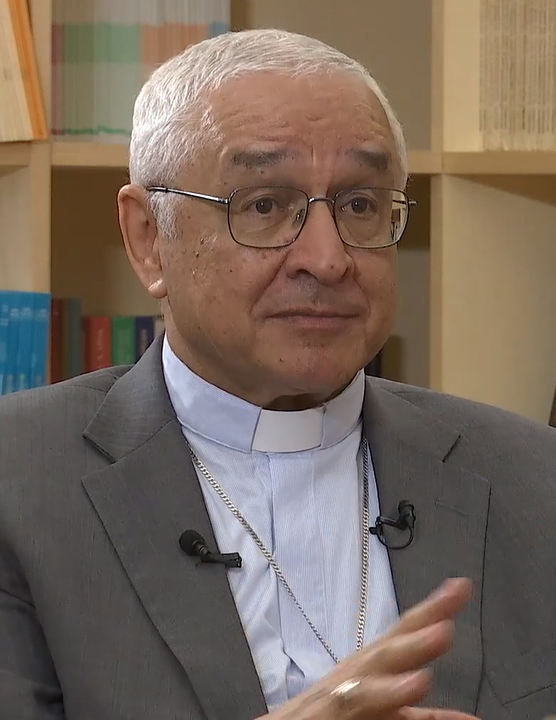
José Ornelas, Bishop of Leiria-Fátima, and President of the Portuguese Episcopal Conference

On the following March 2, the Portuguese Episcopal Conference (CEP) reacted to the report at the end of an extraordinary plenary assembly, which ended with a press conference with the president of the CEP, José Ornelas, who responded to the questions, the vice-president, Virgílio Antunes, and the secretary-general, Manuel Barbosa.

At the press conference, José Ornelas stated that no suspected priest would be removed. “We only have names, it’s very difficult. In order to have the necessary elements to move forward, it is clear that we need to have data and this list that we received only has names. (...) I can't remove someone from the Ministry just because someone accused him. It’s not enough to say, there needs to be a solid foundation”, explained the bishop.

A “name by name” investigation will be carried out: the list of priests and other active religious accused of abuse will be made known to all dioceses so that each of them can be investigated. Then, each diocese will define “the appropriate measures” in each case: “within each diocese, it is each bishop who has to find, in the light of civil law and canon law, what are the appropriate measures to take”.

It is planned to create a new independent commission that will continue to monitor this matter within the Church.

No compensation was announced from the Church for the victims. “If there is an evil done by someone, it is that someone who is responsible. It’s an individual issue”, stated José Ornelas.

Regarding the removal of bishops suspected of covering up sexual abuse crimes within their respective dioceses, the bishop was cautious: “We do not agree with situations like these, but we also do not embark on any accusation of cover-up”.

== Reactions to the Church's position ==
The Church's reaction to the report was immediately subject to much criticism from various sectors of Portuguese society, including from some elements of the Independent Commission itself.

For professor Daniel Sampaio, the press conference was disappointing. He considers that the victims were put in the background. “The Church did not side with the victims” — he said. As for the list of names, he emphasizes that this list resulted from the sum of the names indicated by the victims in the IC investigation with the names that they found in the Church's archives. There should be preventive suspension of individuals who are under suspicion.

Jorge Wemans, journalist and catholic, one of the signatories of the open letter that led to the Independent Commission, considers that the Church has taken “a step back” on the path it had started to follow. He believes that there was a lack of “concrete measures” and, above all, a "reflection on the exercise of power in the Church and the deep clericalism that dominates it", which is precisely where "the possibility of abuse lies".

Lisete Fradique from the movement Nós Somos Igreja (We Are Church), stated that the measures presented by CEP are a handful of nothing. "I couldn't see anything concrete. There was a systematic escape into legal issues. There's a moral problem here," she said. She also argued that those covering up abuse cases "should have the courage to come out."

Lisete Fradique highlighted that, despite the apology to victims of abuse, something was missing in the way the Church, in the person of José Ornelas, addressed the victims. “You don’t see compassion,” she said.

Ângelo Fernandes, from the Quebrar o Silêncio (Breaking the Silence) association, raised doubts about the psychological support that will be given to victims. "How will psychological support be operationalized in dioceses? My reading is that victims were not comfortable going to dioceses to talk about their experiences of abuse."

The APAV - Associação Portuguesa de Apoio à Vítima (Portuguese Victim Support Association) stated that the measures presented by the Church reveal "signs that there is some will", but little else. For the association, there is a distrust regarding the victims' words, which worries them.

For Carla Ferreira, APAV responsible for monitoring cases of violence against children and young people, the announced internal investigation must take place or the acts will be allowed to continue to occur, putting potential victims at risk. She also defended that people under investigation should be removed preventively.

Pedro Strecht, who coordinated the work of the Independent Commission, argued that the data sent to the Church are "important and significant", and not exactly new. "The list that was delivered is part of what the Church already knows, diocese by diocese. This data was also worked on by the Historical Investigation Group (GIH) in the research that was carried out in the historical and secret archives, so I see no reason for concern", said Pedro Strecht. He further added that the Church has "data on each of these cases."

Laborinho Lúcio, who considered the Church's response "very lax", stated that "the bishops, all of them, had a lot of information about the facts that they now say do not exist." Laborinho Lúcio hopes that "Pope Francis' church" will get the better of the ultra-conservative faction in the Church, "which is not the slightest sensitive to the suffering of the victims".

The President of the Portuguese Republic, Marcelo Rebelo de Sousa — admittedly Catholic and who in October 2022 had been widely criticized for, when commenting on an assessment of the number of victims collected by the CI, stating that 400 cases "did not seem like particularly high" — commenting on the CEP's position, stated: "It ignored all the problems." He added: "it fell short on all important points": "in terms of accountability", by "failing to take preventative positions" regarding priests suspected of abusing minors and "falling short in terms of reparation" owed to victims. "Everything was the opposite" of what it should have been, this being made worse because "the Church is a fundamental institution in society" that "the country misses". "If you fail in such a basic situation, it has repercussions throughout the country."

== Grupo Vita ==
On April 26, 2023, the Catholic Church presented Grupo Vita, a body that will monitor cases of sexual abuse against minors and vulnerable adults within the ambit of the Catholic Church in Portugal. The project follows the Independent Commission's investigations.The new body is directed by psychologist Rute Agulhas and consists of two groups: executive and consultative. It is defined by the responsibles as being "exempt, autonomous". Despite this, José Ornelas said that Grupo Vita's operations will be coordinated with diocesan teams, meaning a cooperative action between the committee of experts and the Church.

During the group's presentation, Rute Agulhas said that sexual violence is "a transversal phenomenon, with a higher intra-family prevalence. The Church is a context, like others." And she assured: "The church takes on a pioneering role here." The Vita Group will work in conjunction with the teams from the Comissões Diocesanas de Proteção de Menores e Adultos Vulneráveis (Diocesan Commissions for the Protection of Minors and Vulnerable Adults) .

== See also ==
- Catholic Church sexual abuse cases
- Frederico Cunha
- Carlos Filipe Ximenes Belo

== Bibliography ==
- Comissão Independente para o Estudo dos Abusos Sexuais de Crianças na Igreja Católica Portuguesa (February 2023). Relatório Final (PDF) (in Portuguese). CI.
- Simões, Sónia (2023). Em nome do Pai: Abusos sexuais na Igreja em Portugal (in Portuguese). Oficina do Livro.
