= Canons Regular of the Holy Cross =

Canons Regular of the Holy Cross can refer to one of two Catholic orders:

- Canons Regular of the Order of the Holy Cross, which originated in Belgium
- Canons Regular of the Holy Cross of Coimbra, which originated in Portugal
