= Heinz Gstrein =

Austrian-Swiss theologian (1941–2023)

Heinz Gstrein (6 December 1941 – 1 December 2023) was an Austrian-Swiss Oriental Orthodox theologian, foreign correspondent, non-fiction author and a lecturer at the University of Vienna.

== Early life and career ==
Gstrein was born in Innsbruck on 6 December 1941. He studied Oriental Studies, Slavic Studies and Theology in Innsbruck, Istanbul, Vienna and Paris. He graduated as a doctor phil. He was a foreign correspondent for many years in the Middle East, the Balkans and Eastern Europe, where he reported for the Neue Zürcher Zeitung (NZZ) and the Swiss Radio DRS. This was followed by scientific activities in Zürich and Vienna. He was also Deputy Director of the Institute G2W Faith in the 2nd World in Zürich. He was a lecturer in Ottoman History, Culture, Religion and Islamic Law at the University of Vienna (ULG) Balkan Studies. He was President of the Association of Orthodox Churches in Switzerland (AGOK) and campaigned for Christians living, oppressed and persecuted in Islamic states. He also described the situation of Syrian Christians in the civil war.

== Political engagement in the Swiss minaret dispute ==
In the run-up to the plebiscite on the minaret initiative in Switzerland in 2009, he was involved in the camp of supporters. He wanted to draw attention to the increasing Islamization since the 1970s, which began in Egypt, Algeria and Iran. The public impact of Islam's claim to power would now have reached Switzerland as well, which is why he supported the minaret initiative in order to set a signal against "political Islamization". The minaret is usually a sign of victory and visibility for Islam. In addition, many Islamic states did not or no longer have the right to counter the construction and restoration of Christian churches. In 2010 he wrote an opinion on the unconstitutionality and particular danger of the organization Islamic Central Council Switzerland (IZRS). In it he demanded their ban because it was not compatible with Swiss legal norms.

Opponents of the initiative and daily newspapers like the Basler Zeitung tried to professionally disqualify him and thus discredit him. Gstrein was able to rehabilitate the majority and continue his teaching as a lecturer for Balkan studies at the University of Vienna. Gstrein was also a columnist of the Viennese Die Furche and hephaestus wien.

== Personal life and death ==
Gstrein was married and lived mainly at Erlenbach on Lake Zurich. He died on 1 December 2023, at the age of 81.

== Works ==
=== As author ===
- Unedierte Texte zur Geschichte der byzantinischen Osterpredigt, Wien 1968, OCLC 61751768 (Dissertation doctoral Universität Wien 1968, 1 microfilm reel, 35 mm).
- Zum Beispiel Griechenland (= Disput, Band 4). Delp, München 1969, OCLC 621425.
- Fortschritt ohne Klassenkampf. Arabischer Sozialismus. Imba, Fribourg / Laetare-Verlag, Stein (Nürnberg) 1972, ISBN 3-85740-024-2 (Imba) / ISBN 3-7839-0039-5 (Laetare).
- Volk ohne Anwalt. Die Kurdenfrage im Mittleren Osten. Laetare, Imba 1974, ISBN 978-3-85740-046-9.
  - Avukatsiz Halk Kürtler. Parsomen 2009. ISBN 978-605-5935-85-6 (türkische Übersetzung).
- Ich scheue keine Mühe. Emil Grouard, Apostel von Athabasca (Kanada). St. Gabriel, Steyler Verlag, Mödling 1977, ISBN 978-3-85264-107-2.
    - Nie szczedzil trudu, Verbinum, Warszawa 1994, ISBN 83-85762-29-9, polnisch.
- Unter Menschenhändlern im Sudan. Daniele Comboni. Den Sklaven ein Retter. St. Gabriel, Mödling / Steyler, St. Augustin 1978, ISBN 978-3-85264-119-5.
- Der Heilige aus der Kanone. Jean Le Vacher, Christensklave in Tunis und Algier. St. Gabriel, Mödling / Steyler, St. Augustin 1980, ISBN 978-3-85264-144-7.
- Alle meinen den einen Gott. Lesungen aus den heiligen Büchern der Weltreligionen. Verlag Herder, Freiburg im Breisgau 1981 und 1988, ISBN 978-3-210-24609-3.
- Der Karawanenkardinal. St. Gabriel, Mödling / Steyler, St. Augustin 1982, ISBN 978-3-85264-202-4.
- Das unsagbare Glück. Gebete und Hymnen aus dem Goldenen Tempel. Herder, Freiburg im Breisgau 1983 und 1986, ISBN 978-3-210-24734-2.
- Marx oder Mohammed? Arabischer Sozialismus und islamische Erneuerung. Ploetz Verlag, Freiburg im Breisgau 1983, ISBN 978-3-87640-179-9.
- 300 Bastonadenhiebe für den Bischof. Güregh Zohrabian 1881–1972, armenisch-katholischer Kapuzinermissionar (= Missionare, die Geschichte machten), St. Gabriel, Mödling / Steyler, St. Augustin 1984, ISBN 978-3-85264-212-3.
- Islamische Sufi-Meditation für Christen, Herder, Freiburg im Bresgau 1984, ISBN 978-3-210-24545-4.
- Jüdisches Wien. Herold-Verlag, Wien-München 1984, ISBN 978-3-7008-0264-8.
- Friede allen Welten. Jüdische Lebensweisheit. Aus Zohar, dem Buch des Glanzes. Herder, Freiburg im Breisgau 1985, ISBN 978-3-210-24758-8.
- Kyrill und Method. St. Gabriel, Mödling 1985, ISBN 978-3-85264-247-5.
- Albanien. Walter Verlag, Olten 1989, ISBN 978-3-451-22701-1.
- Engelwerk oder Teufelsmacht? Hintergründe über eine Grauzone kirchlicher Aktivitäten: Neues Heil oder innerkirchliche Sekte. Edition Tau, Mattersburg / Bad Sauerbrunn 1990, ISBN 3-900977-07-0.
- Malta, mit Gozo und Comino (= Walter Reiseführer). Walter, Olten 1988, ISBN 3-530-29601-5; 2. Auflage, Herder, Freiburg im Breisgau u.a 1992, ISBN 978-3-451-22758-5.
- Gnade, Kreuz und Sieg. Mutter Gabriele Bitterlich. Leben und Wirken. Mediatrix, St. Andrä Wördern / Altötting 1992, ISBN 978-3-85406-138-0.
- Gedanken eines Journalisten – Konflikte unserer Zeit. Edition Sckell, Bregenz 2011, ISBN 978-3-9503194-1-5.

=== As co-author ===
- with Martyn Thomas (ed. in chief), Paul Meinrad Strässle, Adly A. Youssef: Copts in Egypt – A Christian Minority under Siege, papers presented at The First International Coptic Symposium, 23-25. September 2004 in Zürich. G2W, Zürich / Vandenhoeck & Ruprecht, Göttingen 2006, ISBN 978-3-85710-040-6 (G2W) / ISBN 978-3-525-54102-9 (V&R).
