= Sexual abuse in the Congregation of the Society of Mary (Marists) =

The Society of Mary (Marists) has had different episodes of Catholic sex abuse cases in various jurisdictions.

== Marist statement about abuse ==
In 2017, the Marist Brothers released a statement to survivors and victims of abuse. It was issued by the 22nd General Chapter and stated that "Abuse is the very antithesis of our Marist values, and undermines the very purpose of our Institute. Any abuse of children is a betrayal of the noble ideals of our founder, St Marcellin Champagnat".

Then the institution fought against adequate compensation measures for survivors of the abuse.

The Marist Brothers then offered less in compensation to Fijian survivors, than they had in New Zealand, leading to accusations of racism.

== Australian royal commission ==
From June 2014, the Royal Commission into Institutional Responses to Child Sexual Abuse, initiated as a royal commission of inquiry by the Australian Government and supported by all of its state governments, began investigating the response of Marist Brothers to allegations of child sexual abuse in schools in the Australian Capital Territory, New South Wales and Queensland. A number of expert witnesses, former students, former teachers, former principals, former and current Marist officials and clergy, and one of the clergy at the centre of the allegations gave evidence or made statements before the commission.

In 2017, the commission published a report which documents significant evidence of child abuse at the hand of members of the Marist order and evidence that the response of the order systematically exacerbated the problems relating to abuse. Included in the report was a finding that "many alleged perpetrators remained in the same positions with access to children for years and sometimes decades after initial and successive allegations of child sexual abuse were raised". In many cases the Commission heard of "the minimisation of allegations of child sexual abuse". One of the key systematic issues that came to light was that it was typical for Brothers to move through many communities and ministries in their lifetime. In the 1960s and 1970s there were typically up to 100 transfers each year. As of 2017, compensation payments made totaled approximately $AUD2.7 million.

In March 2015, a former Marist Brother was arrested over a number of sex offences allegedly committed at St Joseph's College in Hunters Hill and St Gregory's College in Campbelltown in the 1980s.

In September 2016, during a royal commission hearing, the brother provincial of the Marist Brothers in Australia, Brother Peter Carroll, formally apologised to the family of Andrew Nash, whose suicide in 1974 at the age of 13 almost certainly resulted from sexual abuse by three of the order's predatory brothers – Dominic, Patrick and Romuald – and acknowledged that they had many more victims than the dozens who had come forward so far.

Other cases, documented in the report, included those related to Brother Chute who, in 2008, was convicted of 19 child sex offences against six of his former students during the period 1985 to 1989. 48 claims had been made of abuse that occurred from 1959 to 1990 at 6 different schools, while 40 students at Marist College Canberra laid complaints during the period 1976 to 1990. The Marist Brothers did not report any allegations of child sexual abuse to the police in the period 1962 to 1993.

Separately, in August 1996, Brother Gregory Sutton pleaded guilty to a total of 67 child sex offences in relation to 15 students at schools in New South Wales. Sutton had taught at six Marist schools between 1970 and 1986 and there were complaints about the abuse of 27 children made against him during this period. Sutton faced the courts again in Canberra in 2017, when he was given a suspended sentence after sexually assaulting two boys in Canberra in the 1980s.

In March 2025, Sutton received a further 15 months suspended sentence for sexually abusing a boy at a school in Innisfail, Queensland, between 1973 and 1975.

In September 2018, Australian Marist Brother Gerard McNamara, 80, was sentenced to nine months in prison for molesting five boys at St Paul's Catholic College, where he served as principal between 1970 and 1975. He had molested one of these boy 30 times. In May 2020, McNamara began serving a second stint in prison after pleading guilty to indecent assault of more than 15 male students between 1970 and 1975. This time, he received a sentence of 35 months in prison, with 28 months suspended. Since his first sex abuse conviction in June 2006, which resulted in a suspended prison sentence, McNamara received three additional convictions and sentences on sex abuse charges, but was able to once again receive a suspended prison sentence following another conviction in December 2016.

== Cases of abuse in New Zealand ==
Marist Brother Claudius Pettit, real name Malcolm Thomas Petit, was convicted of child-sex abuse of a boy at a Wellington school in the 1990s. In 2005, John Louis Stevenson (known as Brother Bernard) and Brother Andrew Cody of the Hato Paora Māori Boys school in Feilding were convicted of sexual offenses and jailed. A Br. Aiden Benefield (Napier) was convicted of possessing child pornography in 2007.

Subsequently, in 2020, Kevin Healy (Brother Gordon) was convicted of four charges of indecency (from 1976 to 1977) between a man and boys aged 12 and 13, and one of indecency with a girl aged under 12.

Another was Ray Gannaway, known as Brother Ivan, who taught in Wellington and Auckland.

== Cases of abuse in Europe ==
As of March 2016, 29 complaints had been made against six former teachers from three Marist schools in Barcelona, Catalonia, Spain, with three of these teachers confessing to sexual abuse. By February 2019, the number of complaints against Barcelona Marist school teachers had increased to 43, with 12 teachers named as suspected abusers. Two Barcelona Marist Brothers were criminally charged, with one being convicted. The trial for the second defendant commenced in March 2019, who declared in court that the institution knew about the abuses but took no action so he "felt protected by the Marists". He was sentenced to 21 years and 9 months in prison for sexually abusing four children, with the Marist Brothers paying 120,000 euros to each of his proven victims.

Similar cases were reported in Ireland, with a Marist Brother being the first member of a religious order convicted of child sexual abuse in Ireland. Several Marist Brothers were convicted of abuse at a number of schools and a judgement by the Supreme Court of Ireland found the order "vicariously liable" for abuses.

In Scotland, the Marist Brothers issued an apology in 2021 for the "systemic abuse of children" at several schools.

== Cases of abuse in Chile ==
Abuse cases in Marist facilities in Chile included several involving diocesan priests Cristián Precht Bañados and Miguel Ortega of the Archdiocese of Santiago. Chilean police investigated the claims. Precht was suspended from ministry between 2012 and 2017 after being convicted by the Congregation for the Doctrine of the Faith. In 2012, Ortega was found guilty of sexually molesting boys and sentenced to 32 years in prison; he died in 2015. On 12 September 2018, Precht was charged and laicized. Precht had been incardinated in the Archdiocese of Santiago, and gained national recognition in the 1980s when he served as head of the Church's Vicariate of Solidarity human rights group that challenged ex-dictator Augusto Pinochet to end the practice of torture in Chile.

In 2017, the Chilean Marist Brothers revealed that at least 14 minors were abused by Marist Brother Abel Perez from the 1970s until 2000 at several schools in Chile. Perez confessed to his superiors in 2010, and was transferred to Peru.
