= Opus Sanctorum Angelorum =

Catholic movement

Opus Sanctorum Angelorum ('Work of the Holy Angels'), more commonly known as Opus Angelorum ('Work of the Angels'; German: Engelwerk), is a movement within the Catholic Church that promotes devotion to angels, based on the alleged private revelations of Gabriele Bitterlich.

The Holy See recognized it in 2010 as in full conformity with the Church's teaching, after a period in which controversy led to it being placed under the oversight of a Dominican priest in 1992.

It spreads devotion to the Holy Angels among the faithful, exhorts them to pray for priests, and promotes love for Christ in his Passion and union with it.

It is active particularly in Austria, where it originated, and in Germany, but also in Portugal, Brazil, Mexico, India, the Philippines, Italy and the United States.

Between 1998 and 2020 the number of members has decreased from about a million persons (including about 50 bishops and some cardinals) to some thousands worldwide.

The movement is now under the overall direction of the Order of Canons Regular of the Holy Cross, who have about 125 members, living in 12 communities in 10 countries (Austria, Italy, Germany, Portugal, Colombia, Brazil, Mexico, India, the Philippines, United States).

In canon law, the movement is classified as an association of the Christian faithful, and includes, as well as individual members, lay, religious and priests, two religious institutes, the Canons Regular of the Holy Cross and the Sisters of the Cross.

== Membership ==
=== Phases of admission ===
Members of the movement are formally admitted in three phases:

1. The Promise

In the presence of a priest, each prospective member makes a promise to God and the person's guardian angel to love the angel and respond to the angel's instructions given through the person's conscience. Then, during this preliminary year, the future member endeavours to listen to the angel's voice.

2. Consecration to one's angel guardian

In a candle-lit ceremony before the Eucharist, members consecrate themselves to their individual guardian angels, undertaking to become like angels and to venerate them and asking their guardian angels to obtain for them a strong love that will inflame them. Membership begins with acceptance of this consecration by a priest in the name of the Church.

3. Consecration to all the angels

In a similar ceremony, members consecrate themselves to the angelic kingdom, thus enabling them "to live in sacred communion with all things" and bringing to life the individual's "unmanifest creative potential".

=== Number of members ===
Between 1998 and 2020 the number of members has decreased from about a million persons (including about 50 bishops and some cardinals) to some thousands worldwide.

== History ==
The movement was founded by a group of priests and seminarians in Innsbruck, Austria, in 1949. It drew inspiration from accounts that, from 1949 to her death, Gabriele Bitterlich (1896–1978) gave of private revelations that she claimed to have received.

In 1961, the Bishop of Innsbruck established the canonical Confraternity of the Guardian Angels. Other associations followed, including a priestly sodality, and in the following two decades the movement spread to many places in the world.

=== Controversy ===
In her many writings, Bitterlich also proposed some novel theories about the functions, groupings and personal names of angels and demons and about an on-going spiritual warfare between the two. These theories and the practices based on them gave rise to controversy, and on 1 December 1977 Cardinal Joseph Höffner, Archbishop of Cologne, brought them to the attention of the Congregation for the Doctrine of the Faith, which began to study them shortly after Bitterlich's death in the following year.

The Congregation carried out the requested investigation and responded on 24 September 1983 with a letter, known by its incipit, Litteris diei, which laid down:

1. In fostering devotion to the Holy Angels, Opus Angelorum must respect the teaching of the Church and of the Holy Fathers and Doctors. In particular, it is not to spread a form of devotion to the Angels using the "names" derived from the alleged private revelation attributed to Gabriele Bitterlich, nor may it use those names in any prayers of the community.
2. Opus Angelorum is not to demand or even propose to its members what is called the Promise of Secrecy, although with regard to the internal affairs of the Opus Angelorum, it is lawful to maintain the discretion that befits members of the Church's institutes.
3. The Opus Angelorum and its members will strictly observe the norms of the liturgy, especially regarding the Eucharist. This holds in particular for the so-called "Communion of expiation".

This was followed by a decree of 6 June 1992, which repeated the contents of the 1983 letter and, in view of incorrect interpretation and application of that letter, laid down the following rules:

1. The theories originating from the alleged revelations of Bitterlich concerning the world of the angels and their personal names, groupings and functions cannot be taught or in any way, whether explicitly or implicitly, be used in the organization and structure of the Opus Angelorum, such as its worship, prayers, spiritual formation, public or private spirituality, ministry and apostolate. The same rule holds for any other Church-approved institute or association.
2. The various forms of acts of consecration to the angels used in the Opus Angelorum are prohibited.
3. Also prohibited are the so-called distance administration of the sacraments and the insertion into the Eucharistic liturgy and the Liturgy of the Hours of texts, prayers and rites directly or indirectly related to the aforesaid theories.
4. Exorcisms may be carried out only in line with the Church's norms and discipline on the matter, and with the use of formulas approved by the Church.
5. A delegate with special faculties, appointed by the Holy See, will in contact with the bishops oversee and promote the application of these norms. He will also clarify and determine the relations between the Opus Angelorum and the Order of the Canons Regular of the Holy Cross.

=== Approval ===
The delegate chosen was the Dominican priest, Father Benoît Duroux, who in March 2010 handed over to another Dominican priest, Father Daniel Ols.

On 31 May 2000, the Congregation for the Doctrine of the Faith approved a revised form of the movement's Act of Consecration to the Angels.

In 2002, the female institute of the Sisters of the Holy Cross, associated with but independent of the Canons Regular, was established in Innsbruck.

In the following year, 2003, the Congregation for Institutes of Consecrated Life and Societies of Apostolic Life granted definitive approval to the Order of Canons Regular of the Holy Cross (ORC), a religious institute founded in 1131 and suppressed in 1834, which was refounded in 1977 and received the initial (provisional) formal approval (decretum laudis) of the Holy See in 1979. To it, in accordance with canons 677 §2 and 303 of the Code of Canon Law, the care of Opus Angelorum movement is committed.

On 7 November 2008, the same congregation approved the statutes of Opus Angelorum as a public association of the faithful.

On 4 November 2010, the Congregation for the Doctrine of the Faith declared: "Today, thanks to the obedience of its members, the Opus Angelorum can be considered to be living loyally and serenely in conformity with the doctrine of the Church and with canonical and liturgical law. Therefore, in its present state, the Opus Angelorum is a public association of the Church in conformity with traditional doctrine and with the directives of the Holy See."

On 5 July 2024, in line with wishes expressed by Prior General Father Nathanael Thanner ORC one day before, Pope Francis lifted all residual bans and limits issued as to Opus Angelorum since 1992 and relieved the delegate of duty.

=== Opposition ===
The tabloid German newspaper Frankfurter Rundschau published a disapproving article by Jörg Schindler on the Holy See's approval of the movement, claiming that Opus Angelorum believes "smooth-haired dogs, peasant women, gypsies and midwives are particularly susceptible to Satanic impulses, that demons love to take control in Jewish business neighbourhoods and that a long-standing apocalyptic fight between angels and the Evil One is going on."

Others interpreted the Holy See's statement approving the movement as instead a warning to beware of it. A possible example was the heading "Vatican warns of 'wayward' Opus Angelorum sect" given to a BBC news item, which stated that the warning was issued not against the Vatican-recognized movement but against some ex-members, who had either been expelled or who had left of their own accord, and who were endeavouring to form a rival "wayward movement" that would reject the norms issued by the Holy See.

Christian Lichtenstern, writing in June 2017, also said that opponents of the movement's conservatism call it a sect.

Under the heading, "Who really founded the Work of Angels (Opus Angelorum)?", the user Mariat recounted in the Augsburger Allgemeine newspaper blog the many expressions of distrust he had met with regarding the movement, while at the same time mentioning that they did not fit in with what he knew of his parish priest, a member of the movement.

In 1990, journalist Heinz Gstrein, who was also an Oriental Orthodox theologian, wrote that the superior of a religious community in Kerala, India, was sexually abusing members of his community, and turned to the movement for advice and aid. They undertook not to make his lose his position or suffer any other loss and performed an exorcism on him to combat "the demons of homosexuality Dragon, Varina and Selithareth" (names in Bitterlich's writings about angels and demons). Afterwards, he committed a lust murder. Homosexual acts were illegal in India until 2018 and Gstrein points out that concealing a design to commit an offence is punishable under Indian law.

In Germany, the Initiative of Families damaged by Opus Angelorum (Initiative engelwerkgeschädigter Familien) was founded in 1990.

The exorcism using Bitterlich's demon names in violation of the Congregation for the Doctrine of the Faith's 1982 prohibition of use of "the 'names' derived from the alleged private revelation attributed to Mrs Gabriele Bitterlich" may have been one of the reasons for enacting the congregation's more detailed 1992 rules against the use in the movement's "ministry and apostolate" of "the theories originating from the alleged revelations of Mrs Gabriele Bitterlich concerning the world of the angels and their personal names, groupings and functions", and its ruling, "Exorcisms may be carried out only in line with the Church's norms and discipline on the matter, and with the use of formulas approved by the Church."

In 1993, the Brazilian priest Frederico Cunha was found guilty in Madeira of the murder of a 15-year-old who resisted his homosexual advances and was imprisoned. He maintained his innocence both then and later. In April 1998 he absconded to Brazil, from where he, as a Brazilian, could not be extradited to Portugal, but could have been subjected to a new trial if the Portuguese government had requested it. The prison term to which he was condemned expired on 8 April 2018. According to Portuguese and Austrian media, Cunha was a Canon Regular of the Holy Cross. By his own account and that of the Diocese of Funchal, he was incardinated in that diocese.

== See also ==
- Canons Regular of the Holy Cross of Coimbra
- Classification of demons
- Hierarchy of angels
- Schoenstatt Apostolic Movement
