= Canons Regular of the Holy Cross of Coimbra =

Roman Catholic religious order

- Monasteries: 12
- Liturgy: Sacrosanctum Concilium
- Founder: Theotonius of Coimbra
- Origin: 1131
- Recognition: May 5, 1135

The Canons Regular of the Holy Cross of Coimbra (abbreviated ORC) are a Catholic religious order of canons regular founded in Portugal in the 12th century. The ORC follows the Rule of Saint Augustine.

== History ==
The Monastery of the Holy Cross of Coimbra was the first house of the order; from the 16th century it constituted one of the most important cultural centers of Portugal

The Canons Regular of the Holy Cross of Coimbra were founded by St. Theotonius, Archdeacon Dom Tello, and Dom Juan Peculiar in 1131. Construction of its first monastery began on June 28, 1131. On Ash Wednesday, February 24, 1132, the original twelve, along with sixty others who had joined them, made their profession of vows and received the habit. That same day Theotonius was elected Superior. They adopted the customs of the Canons Regular of St. Ruf and in addition to the choral office undertook the pastoral care of neighboring parishes. Under Theotonius, the community flourished, and other houses were added. Hospices at Coimbra and Penela served numerous migrants and travelers. The order enjoyed widespread support, and received privileges and royal patronage. Their success however stirred up considerable jealousy among the cathedral canons and local Bishop. Saint Charles Borromeo was named Cardinal protector of the Order.

Besides offering the sacred liturgy and pastoral work, the canons wrote historical works on Portugal and translated medical works from Arabic. Eventually all the various regional communities of canons regular in Portugal came to be a part of this Order.

== Evangelization ==
The Order of the Holy Cross were entrusted with the mission of the re-evangelization of the territories reclaimed from the Moors. It received official papal approval on May 5, 1135, from Pope Innocent II.

In 1136 Theotonius sent a group of the Canons to the Church of Our Lady of Sorrows in the area of Leiria, Portugal. Four years later, the Moors besieged the Castle of Leiria. The Canons were captured and killed. During this same year Theotonius is said to have consecrated Portugal to the Archangel Michael. In 1154 Dom Pedro and Dom Alfonso and their companions were martyred in Morocco. In 1158 the Monastery of the Holy Martyr Romanus was burned by the Moors; the community of eight canons and their Prior perished.

Anthony of Lisbon was a member of this Order before he left them to join the newly founded Franciscans.

== Suppression ==
Over time struggles between the bishops and various houses and internal dissension among the houses grew. Attempts at reform were made sporadically throughout the 15th and early 16th centuries, the result of which was the suppression or transference of many canonical houses to other orders. By the end of the 18th century, the congregation had slipped into decadence, several houses had been suppressed and in 1791 the Commission to Examine Religious Orders closed almost all novitiates in Portugal. The French invasion and occupation of Portugal (1807–11) left the canons further diminished. However they held on for a few more years until the decree of final dissolution in 1834 by the Portuguese government.

== Revival ==
In 1977, a movement called the Work of the Holy Angels began to work to restore the Order, which was approved in 1979 by Pope John Paul II. The letters "O.R.C."' represent membership in this Order.

== Notable members ==
- Athanasius Schneider, Auxiliary Bishop of Astana, Kazakhstan
- João Pereira Venâncio, Former Bishop of Leiria-Fátima, Portugal
- Saint Anthony of Padua, early years
