= Richard Daschbach =

Richard Daschbach (born January 1937, Pittsburgh, Pennsylvania) is an American former Roman Catholic priest who lives in Oecusse-Ambeno, the East Timorese exclave in West Timor. He ran a children's home there starting in 1991 during the Indonesian occupation. In 2018 he was the first Catholic priest in East Timor to be accused of child abuse. He was laicized and sentenced to twelve years in prison.

== Biography ==
=== Family origins and missionary work ===
Daschbach's father was a steelworker in Pennsylvania. Richard Daschbach had just become a priest as a member of the Steyler Missionaries (SVD) when he first came to the island of Timor in 1966.

As a missionary, he was a pastor in the Indonesian part of Timor between Kefamenanu and the border with the colony of Portuguese Timor, to which Oe-Cusse Ambeno belonged at the time. In 1982, seven years after the occupation of East Timor by the Indonesians, Daschbach went on foot to the Suco Naimeco in Oe-Cusse Ambeno and finally settled in Lelaufe as the local pastor. In 1988 he moved to Cutete (Suco Costa), where he founded the children's home Topu Honis Kutet in 1991.

Daschbach speaks fluent Indonesian and Baikeno, the local dialect. He carried out all his religious activities in Baikeno.

Daschbach gained a reputation for possessing a strong lulik, the sacred power in which the Timorese traditionally believe. One reason for this was that he had new arrivals in Cutete supplied with water and food. While some spoke of divine providence, others reported that Daschbach had already started stockpiling supplies before the independence referendum on 30 August.

Daschbach later continued his work in Oe-Cusse Ambeno. In 2000, 35 boys and girls lived in the home he looked after, in 2004 there were over 100. Women fleeing domestic violence also found accommodation there. A branch of the home was opened in Mahata (Suco Costa) for older children so that they could attend secondary school. The work was financed with donations from East Timor, Australia, Japan, and the United States.

=== Allegations of sexual abuse ===
In March 2018, Daschbach was accused of abusing children from his home. He was stripped of his priesthood in the same year after admitting to abusing minors between 1991 and 2012 in a letter to the SVD on March 15, 2018. He wrote: "It is impossible for me to even remember the faces of many of them, let alone the names". Two Australian donors who traveled to East Timor after the allegations came to light also state that Daschbach admitted the abuse to them. Daschbach was arrested in April. Before the arrest, the attorney general asked the Diocese of Dili whether Daschbach could be placed under arrest there. In good health, Daschbach was initially placed in the SVD residence in Maliana for humanitarian reasons due to his advanced age. The SVD demanded that the Public Prosecutor General's Office submit a written request for accommodation for Daschbach. In addition, the police were to provide security and the accused was not to have any contact with the victims or witnesses. None of the conditions were met. On November 12, Daschbach left Maliana and drove to Oe-Cusse. The SVD informed the authorities and the former priest was arrested upon his arrival in Oe-Cusse. After these experiences, the SVD refused to allow Daschbach to return to Maliana. He was now detained in the capital.

The Justice and Peace Commission of the Diocese of Dili presented a report in 2020 in which the allegations against Daschbach were refuted. It also named the victims and claimed that non-governmental organizations and supporters who had helped the girls were involved in organized crime, human trafficking and exploitation of children by having them medically examined and were guilty of the "crime of judicial mafia". Victims' lawyers sued the church for defamation. The priest who had led the commission was dismissed by Archbishop Virgílio do Carmo da Silva. On November 6, 2020, the Congregation for the Doctrine of the Faith found Daschbach guilty of abusing minors. He was therefore expelled from the Society of the Divine Word on November 30 and dismissed as a priest. The Steyler Missionaries are said to have offered financial support to the victims, but according to their own statements, they failed due to the lack of cooperation from those who now run Daschbach's children's home.

In January 2021, the visit of freedom hero and former president Xanana Gusmão to Daschbach's house arrest caused a stir. Gusmão also publicly took sides with the ex-priest and accused the public prosecutor's office of "great illegality, irregularity and immorality". Gusmão appeared as a witness in the defamation suit against the church and twice accompanied Daschbach on the 13-hour ferry ride from Dili to Oe-Cusse for the trial. Gusmão's Australian ex-wife Kirsty Sword Gusmão and his three sons, who live with her, wrote a letter to the victims in February expressing their disappointment at Xanana Gusmão's behavior. Sword Gusmão criticized the treatment of the victims and their supporters on Facebook. Supporters of the victims include FOKUPERS (Forum Komunikasaun ba Feto Timor).

After three delays, partly due to the COVID-19 pandemic, the trial against the now 84-year-old was opened in 2021. The prosecutor had already been replaced twice before the trial began. The charges were abuse of girls under the age of 14 in 14 cases between 1991 and 2018, possession of child pornography in one case, and domestic violence. The maximum sentence is 20 years in prison. In July 2021, Daschbach was accused by the law firm JUS Juridico Social Consultoria of threatening to kill the Brazilian-Portuguese lawyer Barbara Oliveira by his followers. He is said to have made the threat in passing in the courtroom at the Oe-Cusse District Court. The JUS represented the 17 victims at the trial. There had already been attempts to intimidate the girls via the internet. Daschbach was finally sentenced to twelve years in prison for abusing four girls in December 2021. The child pornography charge was dropped.
