= Frederico Cunha =

Brazilian Catholic priest and murderer

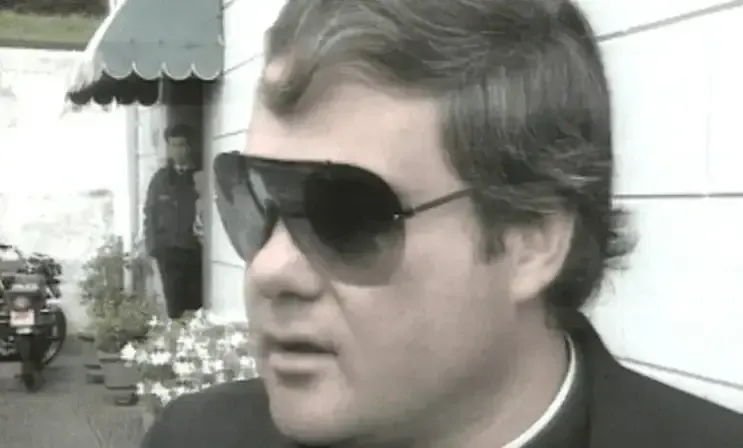
Frederico Cunha

Frederico Marcos da Cunha (born April 12, 1950, in Natal) usually referred to in the media as Father Frederico is a defrocked Brazilian Roman Catholic priest and fugitive, convicted of murdering a teenager in Portugal, as well as sexually abusing numerous children and adolescents. He escaped from prison in 1998, and has been living as a free man in his native country ever since.

== Move to Madeira ==
According to journalist Manuel Catarino, before moving to Madeira in 1983, Cunha lived in Italy and was part of the religious order known as the Canons Regular of Santa Cruz (the Crosiers), which were part of the Opus Sanctorum Angelorum, an ultraconservative congregation that promoted devotion to angels. (The Holy See declared that "the Opus Sanctorum Angelorum, which, as it stands today [2010], is a public association of the Church in accordance to traditional doctrine and the directives of the Supreme Authority; it spreads devotion among the faithful to the Holy Angels, urges prayers for priests, promotes love for Jesus Christ in His passion and union with it.") The Austrian newspaper Kirche In also stated that Cunha had been a member at the time. According to statements by the priest himself and the diocese of Funchal, Frederico was a priest of the diocese, but not of the religious order.

Dom Teodoro de Faria, the bishop of Funchal, who had met Frederico Cunha in Rome, made him his private secretary. Catarino said that Father Frederico's bizarre behavior often attracted attention: he had a taste for skulls, which he wore on his coat or hanged from his belt. At a certain point, De Faria relieved him from his duties, and Frederico began moving from parish to parish. The island's faithful complained. Whenever suspicions grew, Teodoro de Faria moved him to another parish. He spent most of his time as a pastor in São Jorge, where he remained from 1987 until 1990. He then met Miguel, the son of a poor family, whom became his lover.

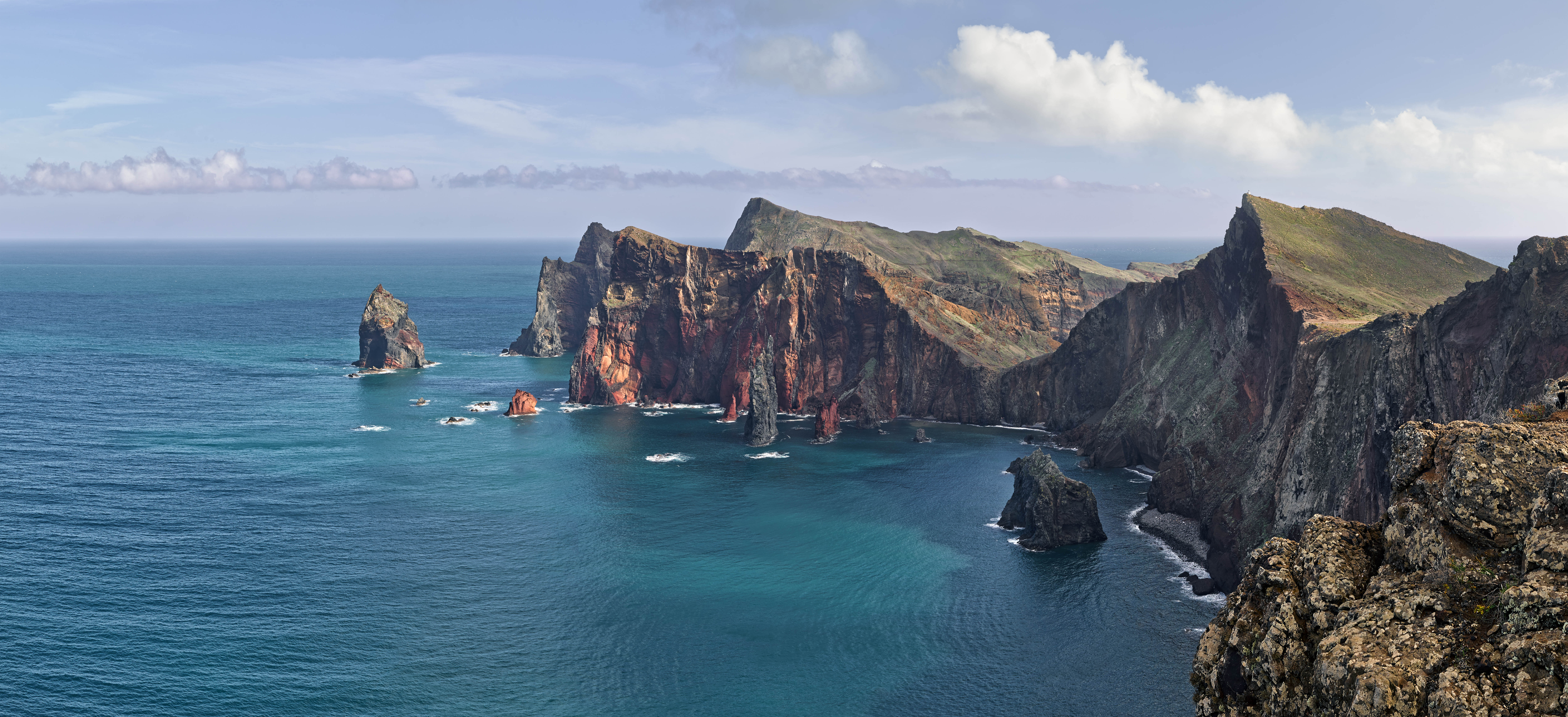
Ponta de São Lourenço, Madeira

== Crime, imprisonment and prosecution ==
According to the Prosecution of the Public Ministry, on May 1, 1992, Cunha met Luís Miguel Escórcio Correia, a 15-year-old boy who was walking on foot along the road to Caniçal, offering him a ride in his black Volkswagen. Luís Miguel's body was later found at the bottom of the Caniçal cliff, at Ponta de São Lourenço, on the eastern end of Madeira, with signs of sexual abuse. According to the prosecutors, the crime took place at the viewpoint, where there were no witnesses. The priest never denied his presence at Caniçal: he was there, but in the company of his lover Miguel. This claim was backed by six witnesses, who had seen the priest with a blond boy in his car.

The victim's corpse was found the day after his disappearance, on the beach below the Caniçal cliffs, where Opus Angelorum maintained its subsidiary Casa do Caniçal. It was initially deemed an accident, but following the autopsy performed by coroner Emanuel Pita, several injuries, including one to the head, were discovered and determined to have originated prior to the fall. Based on the results of the autopsy, a criminal investigation was launched.

An anonymous witness reported to the police by phone that they had seen Cunha's car at the crime scene. In a subsequent search of his home, authorities found an abundance of photographs showing Frederico abusing young and adolescent boys. On May 25, Cunha was arrested and placed in preventative detention at a prison in Funchal.

Bishop Teodoro de Faria protested against Cunha's imprisonment, claiming that he was "as innocent as Jesus Christ" and that he had been framed by Jews. In contrast, many Catholics were "shocked, surprised and ashamed" by this comparison. Father Frederico himself, in an interview with the Jornal de Madeira, compared himself to Jesus Christ, saying that, like the son of God, he was a "victim of injustice and absurdity". At his trial, several church officials served as witnesses. The President of the Regional Government of Madeira, Alberto João Jardim, accused a "certain mainland media" of using the case to "denigrate Madeira's image". In 2010, in an interview with Público, the prosecutor João Freitas, himself a practising Catholic, publicly declared that he had been pressured on several occasions to rush the proceedings and force the acquittal of the accused. He also said that it came not only from the church, but from other areas as well. The diocese of Funchal never opened any canonical process against Cunha, not even after the Court condemned him, preventing any motions for him to be barred from being a priest.

The trial took place on March 10, 1993, a year after the crime. Frederico Cunha was sentenced to 13 years imprisonment for the murder of Luís Miguel, in addition to being deported from the country following his release. Cunha was also ordered to pay the victim's family a sum of 1,600,000 escudos as compensation, which was never paid. Miguel was jailed for 15 months with a suspended sentence for providing false statements to the court. During the trial, four adult witnesses told the court how they had been sexually abused by the priest. Frederico was sent to serve his sentence in Vale de Judeus, Alcoentre.

After serving less than half the sentence, Cunha was authorized by Justice Margarida Vieira de Almeida to be allowed an eight-day leave to visit his mother in Lisbon; on April 10, 1998, both of them fled by car to Madrid and took the first plane to Rio de Janeiro, where they remain to this very day. In Frederico's interpretation, he didn't run away: "They opened the door, I went out and didn't come back." Cunha used a false passport provided by the Brazilian Embassy, which prompted an extradition request from the Portuguese Government, but, after that, nothing more was known.

== Life in Brazil ==
Currently, Father Frederico lives with his mother in a building between Copacabana and Ipanema, in one of the most luxurious neighborhoods of Rio de Janeiro. In 2015, he was interviewed by the newspaper Sol, claiming to still celebrate Mass, but out of public view, and has dedicated himself to abstract photography. He continues to affirm his innocence, and compared his condemnation in Portugal as typical of the Nazi regime.

The international arrest warrant and the rest of his sentence officially expired on April 8, 2018.

== Dismissal from the clerical state ==
In 2023, the Diocese of Funchal asked the Prefect of the Dicastery for the Doctrine of the Faith for "instructions on how to proceed" in this case because, "although for many years his name had not been on the list of priests in the diocese or exercised any ministry in it, in fact there had never been any canonical process regarding the acts of which he was accused and condemned".

On February 16, 2024, Pope Francis finally decreed Father Frederico's "dismissal from the clerical state" and exempted him from the duty of celibacy. According to the document, "Since the whereabouts of Mr. Frederico Cunha are unknown, the Dicastery for the Doctrine of the Faith has ordered that the Holy Father's decision be made public on the diocese's official website." However, as far as is known, the ex-priest continues to live at ease in Rio de Janeiro.
