= David Keane (bishop) =

Roman-catholic bishop

- Bishop of Limerick
- Church: Catholic Church
- Diocese: Diocese of Limerick
- In office: 29 December 1923 – 13 March 1945
- Predecessor: Denis Hallinan
- Successor: Patrick O'Neill

Orders
- Ordination: 23 June 1895
- Consecration: 2 March 1924 by John Harty

Personal details
- Born: 27 February 1871 Ballyagran, County Limerick, United Kingdom of Great Britain and Ireland
- Died: 13 March 1945 (aged 74) Limerick, County Limerick, Republic of Ireland

David Keane (b. Ballyagran 27 February 1871; d. Limerick 13 March 1945) was an Irish Roman Catholic bishop in the 20th century.

Keane was educated at St Colman's College, Fermoy, and St Patrick's College, Maynooth. He was ordained priest on 23 June 1895. After a curacy in Jersey he joined the staff of St Munchin's College. He was parish priest of Glin, County Limerick, from 1919 until his appointment as Bishop of Limerick. He was consecrated on 2 March 1924 and died in post. The Limerick Leader wrote

"A great bishop passes - Death of Most Rev. Dr. Keane - Eminent and saintly spiritual ruler"

Keane is buried in the north transept at St John's Cathedral.

Catholic Church titles
Preceded by Denis Hallinan	Bishop of Limerick; 1923–1945	Succeeded by Patrick O'Neill
