= Henry Murphy (bishop) =

Roman-catholic bishop

The Most Reverend Henry Murphy SThD
- Bishop of Limerick
- Church: Roman Catholic
- Diocese: Limerick
- Appointed: 01 July 1958
- Installed: 31 August 1958
- Predecessor: Patrick O'Neill
- Previous post: Staff of at St Munchin's College

Orders
- Ordination: 21 June 1936 by David Keane
- Consecration: 31 August 1958 by Albert Levame

Personal details
- Born: May 19, 1912 Ardpatrick, Ireland
- Died: 8 October 1973 (aged 61)
- Denomination: Roman Catholic
- Education: St Patrick's College Maynooth

Henry Murphy (19 May 1912, in Ardpatrick – 8 October 1973, in Limerick) was an Irish Roman Catholic bishop.

Murphy was educated at St Munchin's College and St Patrick's College, Maynooth. He was ordained priest on 21 June 1936. He received the degree of Doctor of Divinity (DD). He was on the staff at St Munchin's from 1938 until his consecration as Bishop of Limerick on 31 August 1958. He served as Secretary of the Irish Episcopal Conference, and he attended all the sessions of the Second Vatican Council. He died in post.

Catholic Church titles
Preceded by Patrick O'Neill	Bishop of Limerick; 1958–1973	Succeeded by Jeremiah Newman
