= Brendan Leahy =

Irish prelate of the Catholic Church (born 1960)

The Most Reverend Brendan Leahy SThD
- Bishop of Limerick
- Church: Roman Catholic
- Diocese: Limerick
- Appointed: 10 January 2013
- Installed: 14 April 2013
- Predecessor: Donal Murray
- Other post: President of Veritas Communications
- Previous posts: Professor of Systematic Theology at St Patrick's College; Registrar of Mater Dei Institute of Education

Orders
- Ordination: 5 June 1986 by Joseph Carroll
- Consecration: 14 April 2013 by Dermot Clifford

Personal details
- Born: 28 March 1960 (age 66) Dublin, Ireland
- Denomination: Roman Catholic
- Education: University College Dublin; Mater Dei Institute of Education; Clonliffe College; King's Inns; Pontifical Gregorian University

Brendan Leahy (born 28 March 1960) is an Irish Roman Catholic prelate and theologian who has served as Bishop of Limerick since 2013.

== Early life ==
Leahy was born in the Rotunda Hospital, Dublin, on 28 March 1960, the third of four children to Maurice and Treasa Leahy, both of whom originated in west County Kerry and were primary school principals in Dublin. His father taught for a year in Athea, County Limerick, in the 1940s, while as a child, he spent long periods of the year living in Ballyferriter, County Kerry.

Leahy lived in Crumlin until he was six, before moving to Ballyroan, Rathfarnham. He attended primary school in St Damian's National School, Walkinstown, and secondary school at Coláiste Éanna.

Leahy completed his undergraduate studies in civil law at University College Dublin between 1977 and 1980, and theology, spirituality and psychology at Mater Dei Institute of Education between 1980 and 1981. He studied for the bar at King's Inns between 1981 and 1983, before being called to the bar in 1983.

Leahy completed further undergraduate studies in philosophy at Holy Cross College between 1981 and 1983, and theology at the Pontifical Gregorian University between 1983 and 1986. He was ordained to the priesthood for the Archdiocese of Dublin on 5 June 1986.

== Presbyteral ministry ==
Following his ordination, Leahy completed his doctorate in sacred theology at the Pontifical Gregorian University between 1983 and 1991, leading to a doctoral thesis on the Marian principle in the ecclesiology of Hans Urs von Balthasar.

He was appointed curate in Clonskeagh between 1991 and 1992, serving as the chaplain to St Kilian's German School, before being appointed in 1992 to the staff of Mater Dei Institute of Education until 2006, and Holy Cross College until its closure in 1999. Leahy also ministered in Sutton between 1995 and 1996, and was appointed archdiocesan censor in 1999 while also serving as a curate in Lusk until 2004. He was later appointed registrar of Mater Dei Institute of Education between 2004 and 2006.

On an archdiocesan level, Leahy served as a member of the presbyteral council and the College of Consultors between 1998 and 2004, as well as chair of the commission for ecumenism.

On a national level, Leahy served as secretary of the advisory committee on ecumenism of the Irish Catholic Bishops' Conference between 1999 and 2010, and as a member of the Three Faiths Forum since 1999. He has also served as co-chair of the theology forum of the Irish Inter-Church Meeting since 2010.

Having been involved with the Focolare Movement since his time at University College Dublin, Leahy lived in the Focolare Centre in Prosperous, County Kildare, between 2004 and 2013. He was nominated as an associate member of the Pontifical Academy of Theology in 2004, and appointed professor of systematic theology at St Patrick's College, Maynooth in 2006. He has also been a visiting lecturer at the Sophia University Institute since its foundation in 2007.

== Episcopal ministry ==
Leahy was appointed Bishop-elect of Limerick by Pope Benedict XVI on 10 January 2013. He was ordained bishop on 14 April by the Archbishop of Cashel-Emly, Dermot Clifford, in St John's Cathedral, Limerick. He was the first bishop to be ordiained in Ireland since the election of Pope Francis the previous March, and in the diocese since Jeremiah Newman in 1974.

Leahy is also President of Veritas and was appointed chair of the section on interfaith dialogue of the Commission of Evangelisation and Culture of the Council of European Bishops' Conferences in 2018.

Following the passing of a referendum on liberalising abortion laws on 25 May 2018, Leahy stated in an end-of-year reflection on 28 December that while he acknowledged that a majority voted in favour of the amendment, he hoped "that no-one, or at least very few, willing voted primarily for the abolition of the life of the unborn child in the womb". He added that while legislation provided for the introduction of abortion services in the Republic of Ireland from 1 January 2019, a culture must be promoted that defaults to protecting the unborn, rather than allowing abortion to become the default option for crisis pregnancies.

Ahead of a referendum on easing divorce restrictions in May 2019, Leahy expressed concern at the lack of discussion about the referendum, saying that it would be a shame for voters to tick a box without considering the social context and challenges faced by marriage in the present day. He asked for consideration to be given to establishing a marriage support agency in Ireland.

In response to claims from some Christians that God had punished the world with the onset of the COVID-19 pandemic, Leahy stated on 5 May 2020 that these claims were "a form of blasphemy".

=== Synod Participant ===
He is one of two Irish bishops to have represented the Irish Episcopal Conference at the Sixteenth Ordinary General Assembly of the Synod of Bishops in both 2023 and 2024, widely seen as a landmark event in contemporary Catholicism.

== Bibliography ==
Leahy has both edited and authored a number of publications, both during his presbyteral ministry and his episcopal ministry.

- Leahy, Brendan (1999). Il principio mariano nella Chiesa (in Italian). Rome: Città Nuova. ISBN 9788831132572.
- Leahy, Brendan (2000). The Marian Profile In the Ecclesiology of Hans Urs Von Balthasar. Hyde Park, NY: New City Press. ISBN 9781565481398.
- Leahy, Brendan; McGlynn, Fergus (2003). Contemplating Jesus Through the Eyes of Mary: Living the Rosary in the Light of Focolare Spirituality. Dublin: Veritas. ISBN 9781853907852.
- Leahy, Brendan; Norris, Thomas (2004). Cassidy, Eoin G.; Devitt, Patrick M. (eds.). Christianity: Origins & Contemporary Expressions. Dublin: Veritas. ISBN 1853907960.
- Leahy, Brendan (2005). O princípio Mariano da igreja (in Brazilian Portuguese). Translated by de Almeida, José Maria. São Paulo: Cidade Nova. ISBN 9788578211042.
- Leahy, Brendan, ed. (2005). No Peace Without Justice, No Justice Without Forgiveness. Dublin: Veritas. ISBN 9781853909863.
- Leahy, Brendan; Mulvey, Michael, eds. (2010). Priests Today: Reflections on Identity, Life, and Ministry. Hyde Park, NY: New City Press. ISBN 9781565483460.
- Leahy, Brendan (2011). Believe in Love: The Life, Ministry and Teachings of John Paul II. Dublin: Veritas. ISBN 9781565484214.
- Leahy, Brendan (2011). Ecclesial Movements and Communities: Origins, Issues and Significance. New York: New City Press. ISBN 9781565483965.
- Leahy, Brendan; O'Connell, Séamus, eds. (2011). Having Life in His Name: Living, Thinking and Communicating the Christian Life of Faith. Dublin: Veritas. ISBN 9781847303219.
- Leahy, Brendan (2012). His Mass and Ours: Meditations on Living Eucharistically. New York: New City Press. ISBN 9781565484481.
- Leahy, Brendan; Ryan, Salvador, eds. (2012). Treasures of Irish Christianity: People and Places, Images and Texts. Dublin: Veritas. ISBN 9781847303646.
- Leahy, Brendan; Ryan, Salvador, eds. (2012). Treasures of Irish Christianity: A People of the Word. Dublin: Veritas. ISBN 9781847304315.
- Leahy, Brendan (2013). Year of Faith: Stations of the Cross. London: Catholic Truth Society. ISBN 9781860828461.
- Leahy, Brendan (2013). Going to God Together: Reflections Along the Way. New York: New City Press. ISBN 9781565484832.
- Purcell, Fr. Brendan (2013). Leahy, Brendan; Walsh, David (eds.). The Human Voyage of Self-Discovery. Dublin: Veritas. ISBN 9781847304308.
- Leahy, Bishop Brendan (2015). Who Leads The Church? Noticing the Holy Spirit at Work. Dublin: Veritas. ISBN 9781847306616.
- Leahy, Bishop Brendan (2015). Let's Remember, Let's Review, Let's Renew: The Second Vatican Council, Fifty Years On. Dublin: Veritas. ISBN 9781847306654.
- Leahy, Bishop Brendan (2017). Dreaming Big; Living the Reality. Dublin: Veritas. ISBN 9781847307521.
- Leahy, Bishop Brendan (2017). Graced Horizons: A Journey through Mercy. Dublin: Veritas. ISBN 9781847307583.
- Leahy, Bishop Brendan (2017). Dear Young Friends: Pope Francis in Conversation with Young People. Dublin: Veritas. ISBN 9781847307750.
- Lubich, Chiara (2017). Leahy, Brendan; Povilus, Judith M. (eds.). Maria (in Italian). Rome: Città Nuova. ISBN 9788831144520.
- Lubich, Chiara (2018). Leahy, Brendan; Blaumeiser, Hubertus (eds.). La Chiesa (in Italian). Rome: Città Nuova. ISBN 9788831144537.
- Leahy, Bishop Brendan, ed. (2021). Towards a Better Education of Children: Extracts from Pope Francis' Apostolic Exhortation on Love in the Family, 'Amoris Laetitia'. Dublin: Veritas. ISBN 9781800970175.

Catholic Church titles
| Preceded by Donal Murray | Bishop of Limerick since 14 April 2013 | Succeeded by Incumbent |
