= Bishop Leahy =

Bishop Leahy may refer to several Catholic bishops in Ireland:

- Brendan Leahy, Bishop of Limerick since 2013
- John Pius Leahy, Bishop of Dromore from 1860 to 1890
- Patrick Leahy (bishop), Archbishop of Cashel and Emly from 1857
