= Thomas Leger =

Roman Catholic prelate

Most Reverend Thomas Legger
- Bishop of Limerick
- Church: Catholic Church
- Diocese: Diocese of Limerick
- In office: 1456-1457
- Predecessor: John Mothel
- Successor: William Creagh

Orders
- Consecration: 7 June 1456

Personal details
- Born: Limerick
- Died: 1468 Limerick, Ireland

Thomas Leger (died 1468) was a Roman Catholic prelate who briefly served as Bishop of Limerick.

== Biography ==
Begley records that Legger was appointed Bishop of Limerick by Pope Callixtus III after news reached Rome that John Mothel had died. Legger never received consecration and died in 1468.

== See also ==
- Catholic Church in Ireland
