= William Creagh =

Roman Catholic prelate

Most Reverend William Creagh
- Bishop of Limerick
- Church: Catholic Church
- Diocese: Diocese of Limerick
- In office: 1458–1468
- Predecessor: Thomas Leger C.R.S.A.
- Successor: Thomas Arthur

Orders
- Consecration: 19 April 1458

Personal details
- Born: Limerick
- Died: July 1469 Limerick, Ireland

William Creagh (died 19 July 1469) was a Roman Catholic prelate who served as Bishop of Limerick (1458–1469).

Begley states that very little is known about Creagh's episcopacy other than the records of appointments made in that period and that Creagh recovered the lands at Donaghmore.

== See also ==
- Catholic Church in Ireland

Catholic Church titles
Preceded by Thomas Leger	Bishop of Limerick; 1458–1469	Succeeded by Thomas Arthur
