= John Folan (bishop) =

John Folan (died 30 January 1521) was the Roman Catholic Bishop of Limerick from 1489 until his death.

John Wheelan, known in the succession as John Folan was a canon of Ferns and rector of Clonmore. He was also known to be procurator for Octavian de Palato, Archbishop of Armagh, in Rome. Begley, the authority on the diocese of Limerick, offers very little information on Bishop Folan, saying merely he was consecrated on 13 May 1489 and he carried out repairs and improvements on his cathedral. Begley lists the repairs carried out on the nave and the addition of four chapels parallel to the transept.

He died on 30 January 1521.

Catholic Church titles
Preceded by John Dunmow	Bishop of Limerick; 1489–1521	Succeeded by John Quinn, O.P.
