= Roman Catholic Diocese of Limerick =

Catholic diocese in Ireland

Diocese of Limerick Dioecesis Limericiensis Deoise Luimnigh

Catholic
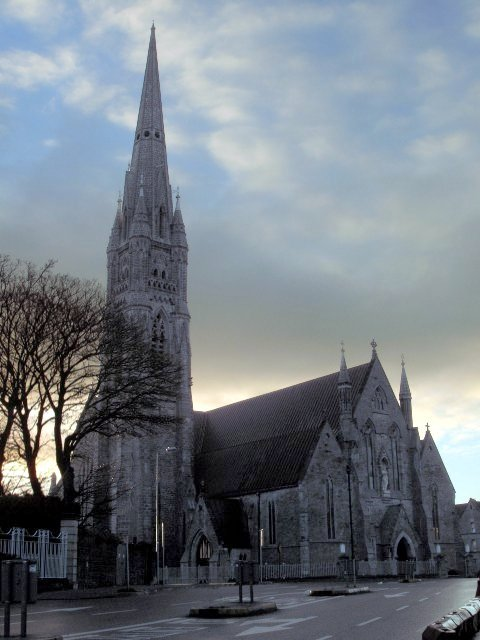
- St John's Cathedral, Limerick

- Logo of the diocese

Location
- Country: Ireland
- Territory: Most of County Limerick and parts of counties Clare and Kerry
- Ecclesiastical province: Cashel and Emly
- Metropolitan: Cashel and Emly

Statistics
- Area: 811 sq mi (2,100 km^{2})
- Population: Total; Catholics: (as of 2016); 192,300; 184,300 (95.8%)
- Parishes: 60

Information
- Denomination: Catholic
- Sui iuris church: Latin Church
- Rite: Roman Rite
- Established: 7th century
- Cathedral: St John's, Limerick
- Patron saint: Ss Munchin and Ita
- Secular priests: 65 (as of 2018)

Current leadership
- Pope: Leo XIV
- Bishop: Brendan Leahy, Bishop of Limerick
- Metropolitan Archbishop: Kieran O'Reilly, Archbishop of Cashel and Emly

Map
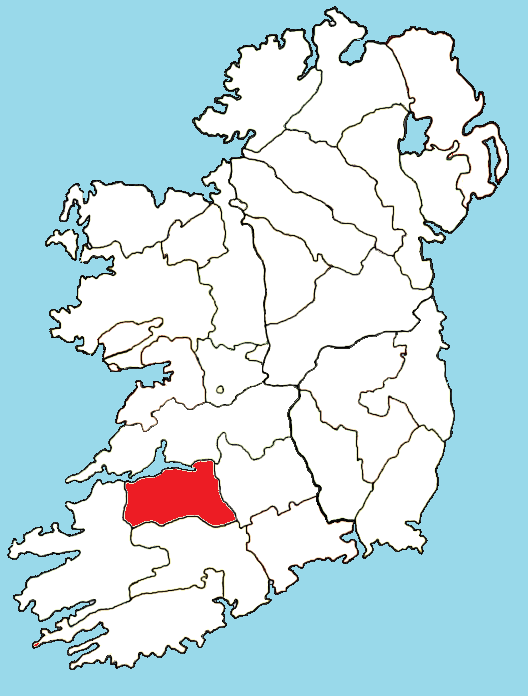

Website
- limerickdiocese.org

The Diocese of Limerick (Irish: Deoise Luimnigh) is a Latin diocese of the Catholic Church in mid-western Ireland, one of six suffragan dioceses in the ecclesiastical province of Cashel and Emly.

The cathedral church of the diocese is St John's Cathedral in Limerick.

The incumbent bishop of the diocese is Brendan Leahy.

== Geography ==
The diocese is divided into 60 parishes, which are spread across three counties: 57 in Limerick (18 of which are in the Limerick city area), two in Clare, and one between Limerick and Kerry.

The parishes are grouped into 16 Pastoral Units, where groups of priests are appointed to cover a number of parishes between them.

As of 2018, there were 65 priests in active ministry, 27 of whom were over the age of 65.

Aside from the cathedral city of Limerick, the main towns in the diocese are Abbeyfeale, Adare, Kilmallock, Newcastle West, and Rathkeale.

Pastoral Unit	Parishes
Pastoral Unit 1	St John's; Monaleen; St Patrick's / St Brigid's; St Michael's; Our Lady Help of Christians, Milford
Pastoral Unit 2	St Joseph's; St Saviour's; Our Lady of Lourdes
Pastoral Unit 3	Donoughmore / Knockea / Roxboro; Our Lady Queen of Peace; Holy Family
Pastoral Unit 4	Sub-unit A: St Munchin's / St Lelia's; Corpus Christi; Parteen / Meelick
Pastoral Unit 4	Sub-unit B: St Mary's; St Nicholas'
Pastoral Unit 5	Christ the King; Cratloe / Sixmilebridge; Our Lady of the Rosary
Pastoral Unit 6	Patrickswell / Ballybrown; Mungret / Raheen / Crecora; St Paul's
Pastoral Unit 7	Sub-unit A: Banogue; Croom; Dromin / Athlacca
Pastoral Unit 7	Sub-unit B: Manister; Fedamore; Bruff / Meanus / Grange
Pastoral Unit 8	Rockhill / Bruree; Castletown / Ballyagran / Colmanswell
Pastoral Unit 9	Sub-unit A: Ardpatrick; Glenroe / Ballyorgan; Kilfinane
Pastoral Unit 9	Sub-unit B: Bulgaden / Martinstown; Effin / Garrienderk; Kilmallock
Pastoral Unit 10	Rathkeale; Ballingarry / Granagh; Knockaderry / Cloncagh
Pastoral Unit 11	Croagh / Kilfinny; Adare; Cappagh
Pastoral Unit 12	Kildimo / Pallaskenry; Kilcornan; Askeaton / Ballysteen
Pastoral Unit 13	Shanagolden / Robertstown / Foynes; Loughill / Ballyhahill; Glin; Coolcappa / Kilcolman
Pastoral Unit 14	Abbeyfeale; Athea; Templeglantine; Tournafulla / Mountcollins
Pastoral Unit 15	Newcastle West; Mahoonagh / Feohanagh / Castlemahon; Monagea; Ardagh / Carrickerry
Pastoral Unit 16	Dromcollogher / Broadford; Killeedy / Ashford; Feenagh / Kilmeedy

== Ordinaries ==
The following is a list of the ten most recent bishops:

- Charles Tuohy (1814–1828)
- John Ryan (1828–1864)
- George Butler (1864–1886)
- Edward Thomas O'Dwyer (1886–1917)
- Denis Hallinan (1918–1923)
- David Keane (1923–1945)
- Patrick O'Neill (1945–1958)
- Henry Murphy (1958–1973)
- Jeremiah Newman (1974–1995)
- Donal Murray (1996–2009)
- Sede vacante (2009–2013)
- Brendan Leahy (2013–present)

== See also ==
- Catholic Church in Ireland
- Church of Ireland Diocese of Limerick and Killaloe
