= Limerick Cathedral =

Limerick Cathedral may refer to:

- St Mary's Cathedral, Limerick, founded 1168; originally Roman Catholic, now Church of Ireland
- St John's Cathedral, Limerick, Roman Catholic, founded 1858
