= John G. Young (bishop) =

Roman Catholic bishop (1746–1813)

Styles of John Young
- Reference style: The Most Reverend
- Spoken style: My Lord
- Religious style: Bishop

John Young (1746–1813) was an Irish Roman Catholic prelate who served as the Bishop of Limerick from 1796 to 1813.

== Biography ==
John Young was born in the parish of John’s St., Limerick, in March 1746 into a well-to-do merchant family. his early education was in Limerick and he later left to study at the Pastoral College of the Irish, Louvain, where he received an M.A. and a Ph.D., he was ordained in Louvain on 23 September 1769. There were two other Irish colleges in Louvain, one for Franciscans and one for Dominicans but Young attended the one for seculars. He worked in Limerick city until he was appointed PP in Bruff in 1782. Nine years later he went as PP to St. Mary’s and became dean of the cathedral chapter. On 3 January 1793, he was appointed coadjutor to the Bishop of Limerick and subsequently consecrated by Archbishop Bray of Cashel on 20 May. He succeeded to the see on 19 June 1796 with the death of Bishop Conway. One of his priorities as bishop was the opening of St Munchin's College, Palmerstown, in November 1796. The college moved on a number of occasions until it settled at Park house, Corbally. The house also functioned as the presbytery for the parish of St Patrick. He started this project with £450 left by Bishop Conway to provide for the education of priests. Another educational endeavour was the production of a catechism including an Irish edition. He was deeply involved in local politics at the end of the eighteenth century and was well known on the national stage. One issue he was particularly well known for was his opposition to the proposal that Catholic priests receive a state salary in return for a government veto on bishops. His rationale was outlined in a letter he sent to the Archbishop of Cahsel. "I think the government well intended, but it may destroy confidence in the flock, create contentions, and open a door for government patronage, intrigue and simony. On the whole, as far as I can see, I am against it either for all or for nay, even the needy. So is Dr McMahon". This was proposed initially by the Chief Secretary Castlereagh. On the other hand Young was an enthuasistic supporter of another project promoted by Castlereagh, that is the Act of Union. The corruption of the Irish parliament at the time played a part in this as it was not friendly towards the Catholic majority. He died on 22 September 1813, at Park House, Corbally and is buried in St. Patrick’s cemetery, off the Tipperary road.

Catholic Church titles
Preceded by Denis Conway	Bishop of Limerick; 1796 – 1813	Succeeded by Charles Tuohy
