= Timothy Leonard =

Timothy Leonard may refer to:

- Timothy Leonard (Colorado politician), American politician
- Timothy Leonard (priest) (1893–1931), Irish priest
- Timothy D. Leonard (1940–2026), American jurist and politician from Oklahoma
