= Edward O'Dwyer (bishop) =

Catholic Bishop of Limerick, Ireland

The Most Reverend Edward O'Dwyer SThD
- Bishop of Limerick
- Church: Roman Catholic
- Diocese: Limerick
- Appointed: 18 May 1886
- Installed: 29 June 1886
- Predecessor: George Butler

Orders
- Ordination: June 1867 by George Butler
- Consecration: 29 June 1886 by Thomas Croke

Personal details
- Born: 22 January 1842 Holycross, Ireland
- Died: 19 August 1917 (aged 75)
- Denomination: Roman Catholic
- Education: St Patrick's College Maynooth

Edward Thomas O'Dwyer (22 January 1842 – 19 August 1917) was the Roman Catholic Bishop of Limerick from 1886 until his death.

O'Dwyer was born in Lattin, County Tipperary, the only son of John Keating O'Dwyer. The family moved to Limerick shortly after his birth, and he was educated at the Christian Brothers school on Sexton Street., and at the Crescent College, Limerick. In 1860, after a year's study at St Munchin's College, he entered the National Seminary at Maynooth College, and he was ordained a priest in 1867.

As a curate in St Michael's Parish in Limerick O'Dwyer was actively involved in the temperance movement. Later as bishop he supported the building of the new temperance hall which replaced the dilapidated premises the Society had operated from since 1839. He also established the Catholic Literary Society.

He was appointed Bishop of Limerick aged 44. While Bishop of Limerick he helped establish Mary Immaculate teacher training college.

As bishop he supported Home Rule for Ireland, but disagreed with the Plan of Campaign of the Irish Parliamentary Party. Following the Easter Rising in 1916, he took a strong stand against repression in a letter—which he published—to the British military commander General Sir John Maxwell, which made him a hero among Irish nationalists. He also supported Physical force republicanism stating "God has made Ireland a nation, and while grass grows and water runs, there will be men willing to dare and die for her. It is that national spirit that will yet vindicate our glorious country and not the petty intrigues of parliamentary chicane."

He died in August 1917.

O'Dwyer Bridge, a bridge over the Abbey River in Limerick city, is named after O'Dwyer.

Catholic Church titles
Preceded by George Butler	Bishop of Limerick; 1886–1917	Succeeded by Denis Hallinan
