= Thomas Arthur (bishop) =

Irish Roman Catholic prelate

Most Reverend Thomas Arthur
- Bishop of Limerick
- Church: Catholic Church
- Diocese: Diocese of Limerick
- In office: 1469–1486
- Predecessor: William Creagh
- Successor: Richard Stakpoll

Orders
- Consecration: 10 September 1469 by Šimun Vosić

Personal details
- Died: 19 July 1486 Limerick, Ireland

Thomas Arthur (died 19 July 1486) was a Roman Catholic prelate who served as Bishop of Limerick (1469–1486).

== Biography ==
On 14 July 1469, Thomas Arthur was appointed during the papacy of Pope Paul II as Bishop of Limerick. On 10 September 1469, he was consecrated bishop by Šimun Vosić, Archbishop of Bar, with Cornelius O'Cunlis, Bishop Emeritus of Clonfert, and Nicholas O'Flanagan, Bishop of Elphin, serving as co-consecrators at Santa Maria sopra Minerva in Rome . He served as Bishop of Limerick until his death on 19 July 1486.

Arthur was a native of Limerick city and member of a prominent family. His father was Nicholas Arthur and mother is named as Catherine Skyddy. Of his five brothers four served as mayor (provost) of Limerick and the other served as sheriff. Canon Begley notes that Arthur was provided the revenues due to the bishop of the diocese for eight years before he became bishop but he never paid the Annates. Once he was consecrated he paid the money to Rome.

== See also ==
- Catholic Church in Ireland

Catholic Church titles
Preceded by William Creagh	Bishop of Limerick; 1469–1486	Succeeded by Richard Stakpoll
