= Denis Hallinan =

Roman Catholic bishop

Dennis Hallinan
- Bishop of Limerick
- Church: Catholic Church
- Diocese: Diocese of Limerick
- In office: 10 January 1918 – 2 July 1923
- Predecessor: Edward O'Dwyer
- Successor: David Keane

Orders
- Ordination: 1874
- Consecration: 10 March 1918 by John Harty

Personal details
- Born: 14 November 1849 Graige (south of Adare), County Limerick, United Kingdom of Great Britain and Ireland
- Died: 2 July 1923 (aged 73) Limerick, County Limerick, Irish Free State, British Empire

Denis Hallinan (14 November 1849, Graigue – 2 July 1923, Limerick) was an Irish Roman Catholic bishop.

Hallinan was educated at The Irish College, Rome and ordained in 1874. After a curacy in Jersey he joined the staff of St Munchin's College. He served in Newcastle West and Limerick. Hallinan was appointed Bishop of Limerick on 10 January 1918. He was consecrated on 2 March that year and died in post. He received the degree of Doctor of Divinity (DD). Bishop Hallinan, with the Sinn Féin Lord Mayor Phons O’Mara, called for the end of the ‘Limerick Soviet’. The socialists complied, and it was dissolved on 27 April 1919, after only two weeks’ existence.

Catholic Church titles
Preceded by Edward O'Dwyer	Bishop of Limerick; 1918–1923	Succeeded by David Keane
