= Bishop Gillebert =

Styles of Gillebert
- Reference style: The Most Reverend
- Spoken style: My Lord
- Religious style: Bishop

Gillebert (Irish: Gilla Espaic; c. 1070–1145) was an Irish Roman Catholic prelate who served as the Bishop of Limerick from 1106 to 1140.

== Biography ==
Very little is known of Gillebert's early life but it is known that he travelled throughout the Continent and was acquainted with Anselm at Rouen where the future Archbishop of Canterbury was a monk so it is very possible that Gillebert was himself a Benedictine.

Gillebert was made bishop of Limerick sometime around the year 1106 but unlike bishops from other Norse settlements like Dublin and Waterford he was not consecrated in Canterbury because Anselm was in exile at that period.

After consecration Gillebert and Anselm corresponded and exchanged gifts; a copy of the correspondence can be found in Rev Begley's history of the Diocese of Limerick. Gillebert congratulated Anselm for his success in the Investiture Controversy. Gillebert played an important part in reforming the Irish Church of the day and bring it in line with Roman practice. In his first years as bishop he was especially zealous in trying to bring about uniformity of liturgy especially in the canonical hours. It was these reforms that brought him to the attention of Rome and he was appointed Papal Legate.

When Muirchertach Ua Briain under the influence of Anselm called the Synod of Ráth Breasail Gilbert presided as legate. This synod began to bring Ireland more into line with the diocesan system that existed in the rest of Christendom.

On account of his old age Gillebert resigned as Papal Legate in 1139, and he died in 1145.

Catholic Church titles
Preceded by no record	Bishop of Limerick; 1106 – 1145	Succeeded by Patrick
