= Denis Conway (bishop) =

Irish Catholic bishop

Styles of Denis Conway
- Reference style: The Most Reverend
- Spoken style: My Lord
- Religious style: Bishop

Denis Conway (1722–1796) was an Irish Roman Catholic prelate who served as the Bishop of Limerick from 1779 to 1796.

== Biography ==
Denis Conway studied at the Irish College in Louvain and was ordained a priest 22 September 1753. He became bishop of Limerick in 1779 receiving consecration by Archbishop James Butler 2nd and died in 1796.

Catholic Church titles
Preceded by John Butler SJ	Bishop of Limerick; 1796 – 1813	Succeeded by John Young
