= Peter McKevitt =

Peter McKevitt (30 November 1900 – 3 November 1976) was an Irish Roman Catholic priest, author and sociologist. He served as Chair of Catholic Sociology and Catholic Action in St. Patrick’s College, Maynooth, holding the position from 1937 to 1953.

== Career ==
McKevitt was born in Carlingford on 30 November 1900 and was ordained priest on 21 June 1925. His academic background was not in sociology but in theology and philosophy. His PhD was awarded in 1938 by the Catholic University of Leuven, Belgium, on the basis of a dissertation on the Scottish philosopher Andrew Seth Pringle-Pattison. To prepare for the appointment as Professor of Catholic Sociology, a chair endowed by the Knights of Saint Columbanus but for which no immediately suitable candidate could be found, he was sent to Rome to study courses on sociology, international labour organisation, political economy, the social encyclicals, Catholic Action and the history of Russian Bolshevism.

Alongside Cornelius Lucey, Maynooth’s Professor of Social Ethics, McKevitt played an important role in the instigation of the Christus Rex Society in 1941. With Lucey, he founded the Society's journal, Christus Rex: An Irish Quarterly Journal of Sociology, in January 1947. This was the precursor of Social Studies: Irish Journal of Sociology.

McKevitt's main work, The Plan for Society, was published in 1944. This has been described as "Ireland's first sociological textbook. It related general principles of Catholic social teaching to specific Irish problems such as emigration and rural decline".

His analysis of the dangers of expanding state power underlay episcopal opposition to proposals to develop a welfare state in post-war Ireland on the model of that inspired by the Beveridge Report in the United Kingdom:

the leading clerical intellectual Revd Dr Peter McKevitt [...] gave warning of the latent dangers that underlay any expansion of the State's social role, 'the more we load the State with duties, the greater the powers we must give it over the arranging of our lives'. [...] Throughout 1944 and 1945 the Lenten Pastorals of the Irish Catholic Bishops, taking their lead from McKevitt's analysis, warned of the incipient but mounting dangers that expanded State power posed to Catholic religious and social values.

In 1950 he addressed the World Congress of Sociology and Political Science at Zürich, Switzerland, on "The Sociological Significance of Irish Emigration".

== Retirement ==
McKevitt retired from teaching in 1953 and was replaced as professor by Father Jeremiah Newman. He became a parish priest in Termonfeckin for the last 23 years of his life. In 1963 he became the first president of Termonfeckin Credit Union. Appointed canon and monsignor (1967), he died on 3 November 1976, a few months after retiring as parish priest.
