= Bishop of Limerick =

Episcopal title

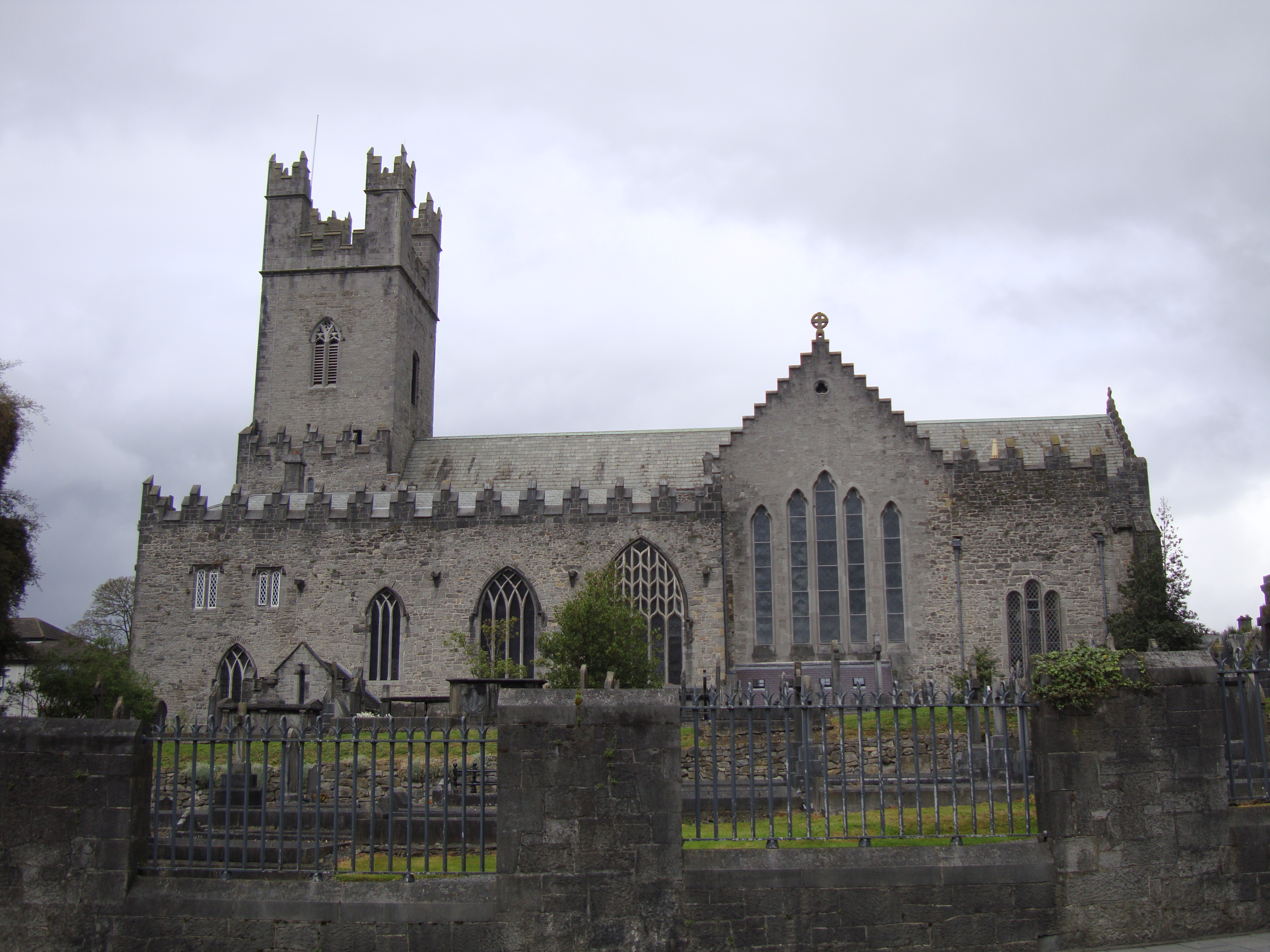
St Mary's Cathedral, Limerick, the episcopal seat of the pre-Reformation and Church of Ireland bishops.

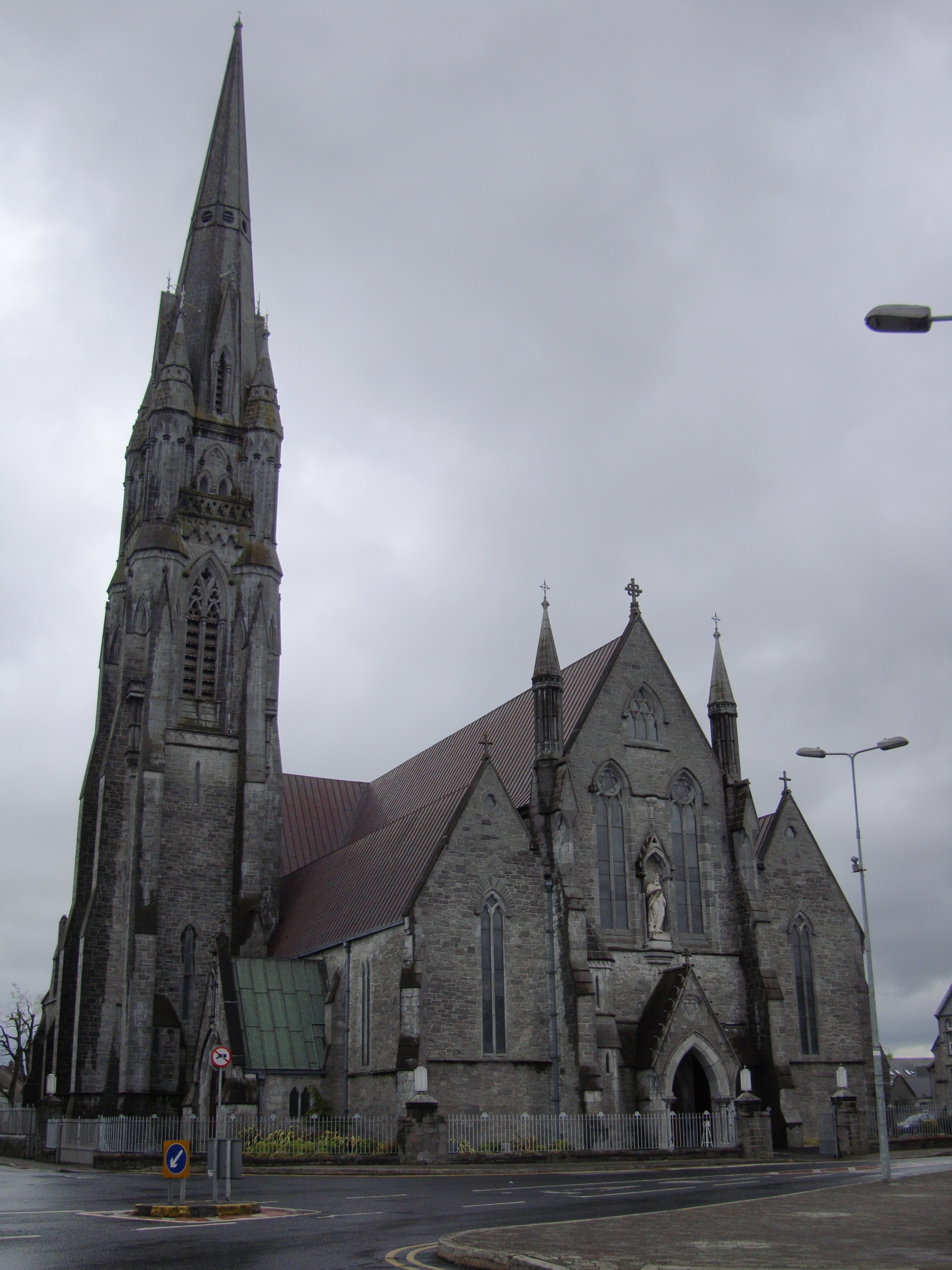
St John's Cathedral, Limerick, the episcopal seat of the Roman Catholic bishops.

The Bishop of Limerick is an episcopal title which takes its name after the city of Limerick in the Province of Munster, Ireland. In the Catholic Church it still continues as a separate title, but in the Church of Ireland it has been united with other bishoprics.

== History ==
The diocese of Limerick is one of the twenty-four dioceses established at the Synod of Rathbreasail in 1111. After the Reformation, there are parallel apostolic successions: one of the Church of Ireland and the other of the Roman Catholic Church.

In the Church of Ireland, Limerick continued as a separate title until 1661 when it was combined with Ardfert and Aghadoe to form the united bishopric of Limerick, Ardfert and Aghadoe. Since 1976, the Church of Ireland see has been part of the united bishopric of Limerick and Killaloe.

In the Roman Catholic Church, Limerick still remains as a separate title. The current bishop is the Most Reverend Brendan Leahy, Bishop of the Roman Catholic Diocese of Limerick, who was appointed by the Holy See on 10 January 2013 and received episcopal ordination on 14 April 2013.

== Pre-Reformation bishops ==
List of Pre-Reformation Bishops of Limerick
From	Until	Incumbent	Notes
c.1106	1140	Gilli alias Gilla Espaic	Consecrated c. 1106; presided as papal legate at the Synod of Rathbreasail in 1111; resigned 1140; died 1145; also known as Gilbert
1140	1148	Patricius	Consecrated at Canterbury in 1140 and took an oath of fealty there, however, his name does not occur in any Irish record. One source says he died shortly after and never took possession of the diocese. He died after December 1148
c.1140	1151	Erolb	Probably a successful rival of Patricius, known as an Ostman; governed the see from c. 1140 until his death in 1151; He is called Harold by Usher
bef.1152	1167	Torgesius	Present at the Synod of Kells in March 1152; died in office
bef.1167	c.1186/89	Brictius	Became bishop before 1167; assisted at the Third Council of the Lateran in 1179 and 1180; died sometime between 1186 and 1189
bef.1190	1207	Donnchad Ua Briain	Became bishop before 1190; died before 5 December 1207; also known as Donatus
1207		(Geoffrey)	Rector of Dungarvan; nominated by King John on 5 December 1207, but no evidence he was validly elected or consecrated
1208/15	1222	Edmund	Became bishop before July 1215, and probably governed the see from c. 1208; died in office
1223	1250	Hubert de Burgo, O.S.A.	Formerly Prior of Athassel; became custodian of the diocese 11 March 1223 and elected bishop before 7 May 1224; received possession of the temporalities c. 21 April 1225; died 14 September 1250
1251	1272	Robert of Emly	Elected before 11 April 1251 and received possession of the temporalities 6 January 1252; died 8 September 1272
1273	1302	Gerald Le Marescal	Formerly Archdeacon of Limerick; elected bishop before 11 January 1273 and received possession of the temporalities 17 January 1273; died 10 February 1302
1302	1311	Robert de Dundonald	Formerly a Canon of Limerick; elected bishop before 2 May 1302 and received possession of the temporalities 30 July 1302; died 3 May 1311
1312	1336	Eustace de l'Eau	Formerly Dean of Limerick; elected bishop c. 20 November 1312 and received possession of the temporalities after 1 December 1312; died 3 May 1336; also known as Eustace de Aqua
1336	1353	Maurice de Rochfort	Elected before 7 November 1336 and received possession of the temporalities on that date; consecrated 6 April 1337; died 9 June 1353; also known as Maurice de Rupe
1354	1359	Stephen Lawless	Formerly Chancellor of Limerick; appointed bishop 19 February 1354; consecrated before 7 April 1354; received possession of the temporalities 29 April 1354; died 28 December 1359
1360	1369	Stephen Wall	Formerly Dean of Limerick; elected bishop before 6 November 1360 and appointed on that date; received possession of the temporalities 2 March 1361; translated to Meath 19 February 1369; also known as Stephen de Valle
1369	c.1399	Peter Curragh	Appointed 19 February 1369; received possession of the temporalities 10 February 1370; translated to Ross c. 1399
c.1399		(Bernardus Ó Conchobhair)	Translated from Ross c. 1399, but did not take effect
1400	1434	Conchobhar Ó Deadhaidh, O.F.M.	Formerly Archdeacon of Killaloe; appointed bishop 26 May 1400; resigned before October 1425; died 27 July 1434; also known as Cornelius O'Dea
1426	1458	John Mothel, O.S.A.	Formerly a Canon of Kells; appointed bishop 7 October 1426; received possession of the temporalities 23 January 1427; resigned c. April 1458; died 1468
1456		Thomas Leger, O.S.A.	Appointed 10 May 1456 whilst John Mothel was still bishop; deprived 23 November 1456
1458	1469	William Creagh	Appointed 19 April 1458; died before July 1469; also known as William Russell
1469	1486	Thomas Arthur	Appointed 14 July and consecrated 10 September 1469; died 19 July 1486
1486		Richard Stakpoll	Appointed 18 September 1486, but was made void by the appointment of Dunowe; died before 20 November 1486. Was 24 years old at the time of his appointment and was not to be consecrated until he reached 28 though he died the same year.
1486	1489	John Dunowe	Formerly a Canon of Exeter; appointed bishop 13 November 1486; acted as a suffragan bishop in the diocese of Exeter 1489; died before April 1489
1489	1521	John Folan	Formerly a Canon of Ferns; appointed bishop 24 April 1489; died 30 January 1522; also known as John O'Phelan and in some sources as John Whelan.
1524	1551	John Quin, O.P. ^{[A]}	Appointed 21 October 1524 and consecrated before 3 January 1525; swore the Oath of Supremacy at Clonmel early in 1539; resigned 9 April 1551; died 1554 (or 1555); also known as John Coyn or Seaán Ó Cuinn

== Post-Reformation bishops ==
=== Church of Ireland succession ===
List of Church of Ireland Bishops of Limerick
From	Until	Incumbent	Notes
1551	1556	William Casey	Formerly Rector of Kilcornan; nominated bishop by King Edward VI on 6 July 1551 and consecrated at Dublin on 25 October 1551; deprived by Queen Mary I in 1556
1556	1571	Hugh Lacy ^{[B]}	Formerly a Canon of Limerick; appointed bishop 24 November 1556; in a letter of 12 October 1561, the papal legate Fr David Wolfe SJ described all the bishops in Munster as 'adherents of the Queen'; in 1562 the Lord Lieutenant the Earl of Sussex said that he had 'by the laws of the realm, forfeited his bishopric'; appointed to an ecclesiastical commission for enforcing the royal supremacy in June 1564; deprived 8 May 1571; died 1580; also known as Hugh de Lacey or Lees
1571	1591	William Casey (again)	Restored by Queen Elizabeth I on 8 May 1571; died on 7 February 1591
appointed 1588		(Denis Campbell)	Dean of Limerick; appointed coadjutor bishop in 1588 to Bishop Casey; Campbell was later nominated to be bishop of Derry, Raphoe and Clogher in 1603, but died before consecration in July 1603
1594	1603	John Thornborough	Formerly Dean of York; nominated 20 September 1593 and appointed by letters patent 9 January 1594; translated to Bristol 4 July 1603; also known as John Thornburgh
1604	1626	Bernard Adams	Nominated 5 August 1603 and consecrated April 1604; also held Kilfenora in commendam from 1606 to 1617; died 22 March 1626
1626	1634	Francis Gough	Formerly Chancellor of Limerick; nominated 18 April and consecrated 17 September 1626; died 29 August 1634
1634	1642	George Webb	Formerly Chaplain-in-Ordinary to King Charles II; nominated bishop 6 October and consecrated 18 December 1634; died as a prisoner at the castle in Limerick on 22 June 1642
1643	1649	Robert Sibthorp	Translated from Kilfenora; nominated 7 April 1643; died in April 1649
1649	1660	See vacant	
1660	1661	Edward Synge	Formerly Dean of Elphin; nominated bishop 6 August 1660; became Bishop of Limerick, Ardfert and Aghadoe in 1661
1661	1976	See part of the united bishopric of Limerick, Ardfert and Aghadoe.	
Since 1976		See part of the united bishopric of Limerick and Killaloe.	

=== Roman Catholic succession ===
List of Roman Catholic Bishops of Limerick
From	Until	Incumbent	Notes
1551	1556	See vacant	
1556	1580	Hugh Lacy ^{[C]}	Formerly a Canon of Limerick; appointed 24 November 1556; received special faculties for the province of Cashel in the absence of the archbishop on 3 May 1575; died 1580
1582	1591	Cornelius O'Boyle	Appointed 20 August 1582; died after 1591
1591	1602	See vacant	
appointed 1602		Richard Cadan	Appointed vicar apostolic by papal brief 22 February 1602
1620	1646	Richard Arthur	Named as vicar general of Limerick in a government report in 1613, and as bishop-elect in a later report 1617; appointed 18 May 1620 and consecrated September 1623; died 23 May 1646
1646	1654	Edmund O'Dwyer	Appointed coadjutor bishop (with right of succession) 6 February and consecrated 7 May 1645; succeeded 23 May 1646; died 5 April 1654
1657	1685	James Dowley	Appointed vicar apostolic by papal brief 17 April 1657 and again 31 July 1669; appointed bishop 4 May 1676 and by papal brief 8 March 1677; died c. January 1685
1698	1702	John O'Molony	Translated from Killaloe 24 January 1689, but continued as Apostolic Administrator of Killaloe 1689–1702; died 3 September 1702
1702	1720	See vacant	
1720	1737	Cornelius Ó Caoimh	Appointed 7 March 1720; died 4 May 1737
1737	1759	Robert Lacy	Appointed 30 August 1737 and consecrated 23 February 1638; died 4 August 1759
1759	1778	Daniel O'Kearney	Appointed 27 November 1759 and consecrated 27 January 1760; died 24 January 1778
(1778)		(John Butler, S.J.)	Appointed 10 April 1778, but was not accepted
1779	1796	Denis Conway	Appointed 25 February and consecrated 20 June 1779; died 19 June 1796
1796	1813	John Young	Appointed coadjutor bishop (with right of succession) 4 January and consecrated 20 May 1793; succeeded 19 June 1796; died 22 September 1813
1814	1828	Charles Tuohy	Appointed 1 October 1814 and consecrated 23 April 1815; died 17 March 1828
1828	1864	John Ryan	Appointed coadjutor bishop (with right of succession) 31 September and consecrated 11 December 1825; succeeded 17 March 1828; died 6 June 1864
1864	1886	George Butler	Appointed 10 June and consecrated 25 July 1861; succeeded 6 June 1864; died 3 February 1886
1886	1917	Edward Thomas O'Dwyer	Appointed 18 May and consecrated 29 June 1886; died 19 August 1917
1918	1923	Denis Hallinan	Appointed 10 January and consecrated 10 March 1918; died 2 July 1923
1923	1945	David Keane	Appointed 24 December 1923 and consecrated 2 March 1924; died 12 March 1945
1945	1958	Patrick O'Neill	Appointed 15 December 1945 and consecrated 24 February 1946; died 26 March 1958
1958	1973	Henry Murphy	Appointed 1 July and consecrated 31 August 1958; died 8 October 1973
1974	1995	Jeremiah Newman	Appointed 17 May and consecrated 14 July 1974; died 3 April 1995
1994	1996	(John Magee, Bishop of Cloyne)	Acted as Apostolic Administrator of the Diocese of Limerick from July 1994 to March 1996.
1996	2009	Donal Brendan Murray	Previously Auxiliary Bishop of Dublin and Titular Bishop of Glenndálocha 1982–1996; appointed bishop of Limerick on 10 February 1996 and installed at St John's Cathedral, Limerick on 24 March 1996; resignation accepted on 17 December 2009
2009	2013	See vacant	
2013	present	Brendan Leahy	Appointed on 10 January 2013 and received episcopal ordination on 14 April 2013.

== Notes ==
- ^{A} Some sources state that John Quin resigned by consequences of his infirmities. However, another source states he was forced to resign by King Edward VI in 1551, but was restored by Queen Mary I in 1553.
- ^{B} ^{C} Hugh Lacy became bishop of both successions when they were briefly reunited in the reign of Queen Mary I. After the accession of Queen Elizabeth I, he was deprived of the Church of Ireland title in 1571, but continued with the Roman Catholic title until his death in 1580.

== Bibliography ==
- Cotton, Henry (1851). The Province of Munster. Fasti Ecclesiae Hiberniae: The Succession of the Prelates and Members of the Cathedral Bodies of Ireland. Vol. 1 (2nd ed.). Dublin: Hodges and Smith.
- Fryde, E. B.; Greenway, D. E.; Porter, S.; Roy, I., eds. (1986). Handbook of British Chronology (3rd, reprinted 2003 ed.). Cambridge: Cambridge University Press. ISBN 0-521-56350-X.
