= Cornelius O'Boyle =

Irish Catholic Bishop

Styles of Cornelius O'Boyle
- Reference style: The Most Reverend
- Spoken style: My Lord
- Religious style: Bishop

Cornelius O'Boyle (c. 1547– 1591) was an Irish Roman Catholic prelate who was Bishop of Limerick from 1582 to 1591.

== Biography ==
O'Boyle was a priest of the diocese of Armagh when he was appointed bishop of Limerick by Pope Gregory XIII. At the time he was living in Portugal. He was consecrated bishop in Rome and after consecration went to Spain. In Spain he corresponded with churchmen about the ongoing Second Desmond Rebellion. It is not known if O'Boyle ever visited Ireland after his consecration as all subsequent information about him points to his living in Spain.
