= George Butler (bishop) =

Roman-catholic bishop

George Butler (13 February 1815, Limerick – 3 February 1886, Limerick) was an Irish Roman Catholic bishop.

Butler was educated at St Patrick's College, Maynooth, and ordained in 1838. He spent his whole career in Limerick, as a curate, then a parish priest, and finally as dean of its cathedral. He was consecrated on 6 June 1864 and died in post. He received the degree of Doctor of Divinity (DD).

Catholic Church titles
Preceded by John Ryan	Bishop of Limerick; 1864–1886	Succeeded by Edward O'Dwyer
