= Cratloe-Sixmilebridge =

Catholic parish in Munster, Ireland

- Roman Catholic parish
- Location in Ireland
- Coordinates: 52°41′52.9″N 8°45′19.76″W
- Country: Ireland
- Province: Munster
- County: County Clare

Government
  - Dáil Éireann: Clare
- Time zone: UTC+0 (WET)
  - Summer (DST): UTC-1 (IST (WEST))

Cratloe-Sixmilebridge is a parish in County Clare, Ireland, and part of the Roman Catholic Diocese of Limerick.

As of 2021, parish priest is Richard Keane.

The original name of the parish was Kilfintinan.

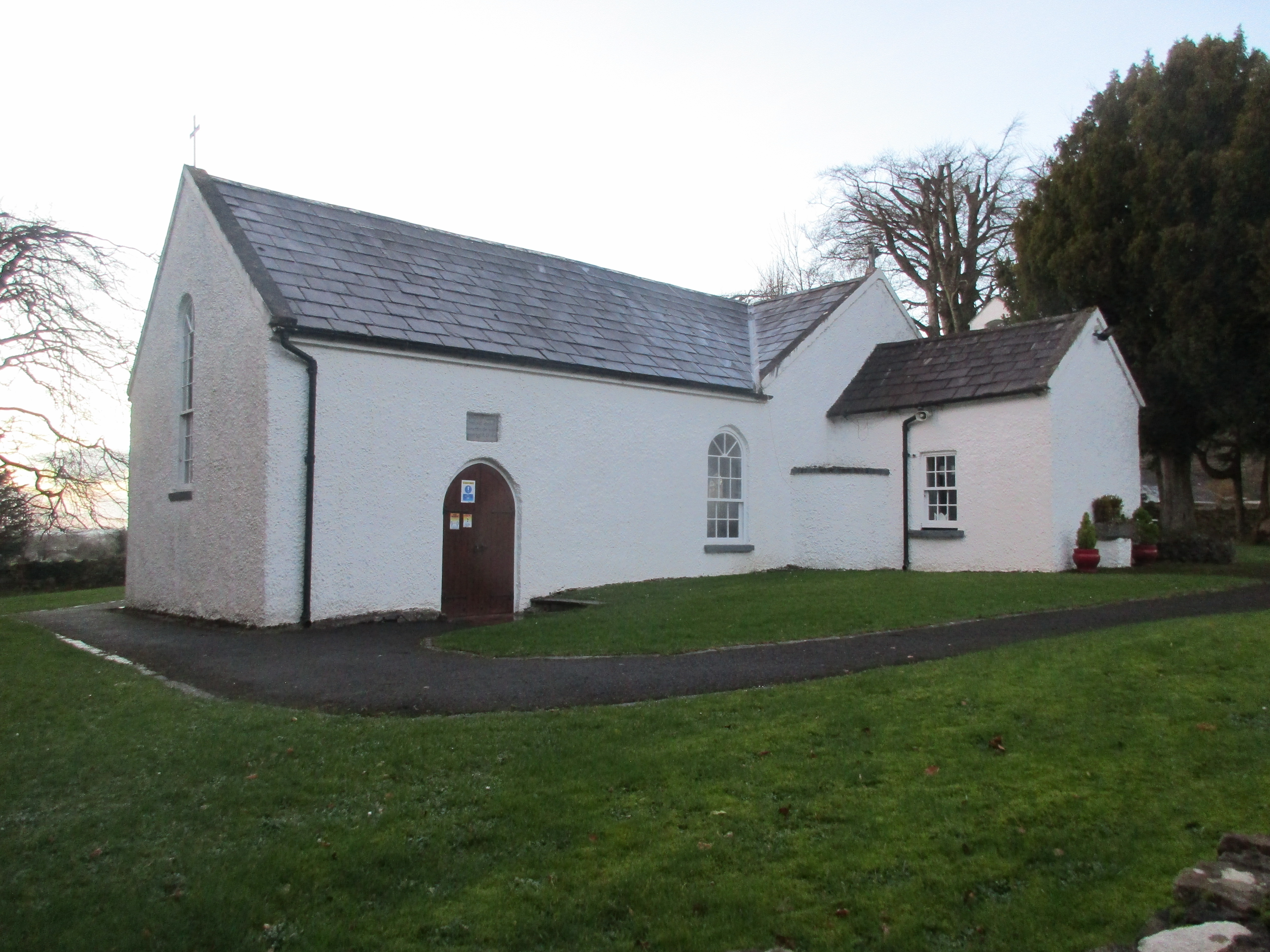
Church of St. John in Cratloe

The main church of the parish is the Church of St. John in Cratloe, with 1798 mentioned as the start date of the actual building. In later times it was several times enlarged. The church survived a proposal in the late eighties to demolish the church and build a new one. Due to a vocal group of parishioners being against the plan, the barn church was renovated instead.

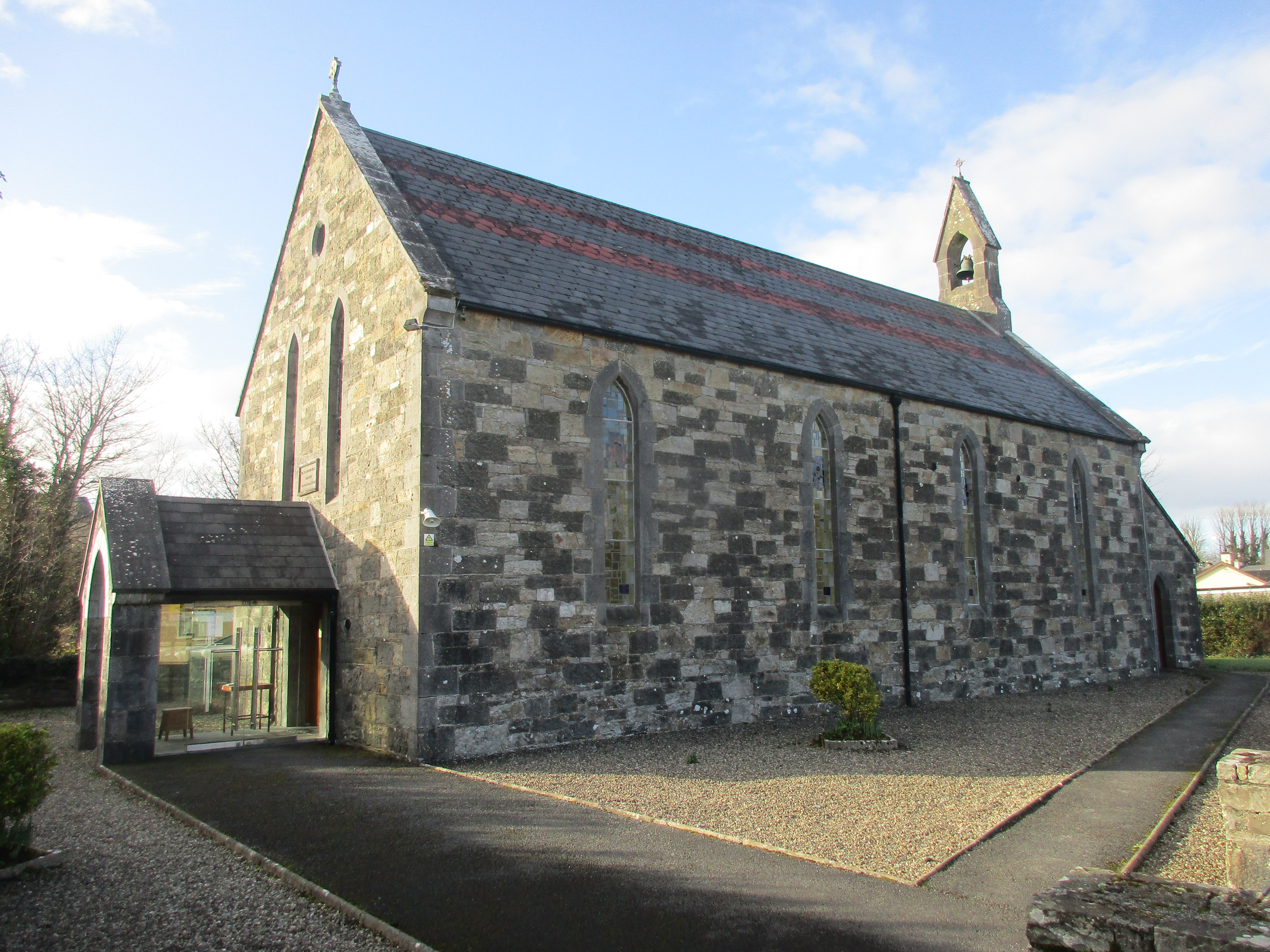
the "Little Church" in Sixmilebridge

The second church of the parish is the "Little Church" in Sixmilebridge. This church was built in 1858 as replacement for a thatched church from 1799. The church has never had an official patron saint. It is likely that the name of the church is derived from a simple comparison with the bigger Church of St. Finaghta on the other side of the town that belongs to the parish of Sixmilebridge in the Diocese of Killaloe.
