= Francis Gough =

Francis Gough, J.P. (1594-1634) was an Anglican bishop in Ireland during the first half of the Seventeenth century.

Gough was born in Wiltshire and educated at St Edmund Hall, Oxford. He was appointed Chancellor of Limerick in 1618; and consecrated Bishop of Limerick in 1626. He died on 29 August 1634.
