= Patrick O'Neill (bishop) =

Irish Roman Catholic bishop (1891–1958)

- Bishop of Limerick
- Church: Catholic Church
- Diocese: Diocese of Limerick
- In office: 15 December 1945 – 26 March 1958
- Predecessor: David Keane
- Successor: Henry Murphy

Orders
- Ordination: 20 June 1915
- Consecration: 24 February 1946 by Jeremiah Kinane

Personal details
- Born: 8 February 1891 Grange (east of Fedamore), County Limerick, United Kingdom of Great Britain and Ireland
- Died: 26 March 1958 (aged 67) Limerick, County Limerick, Republic of Ireland

Patrick O'Neill (b Fedamore 8 February 1891; d Limerick 26 March 1958) was an Irish Roman Catholic Bishop.

== Early life and education ==
Patrick O'Neill was born at Grange, Fedamore, Co Limerick to John and Mary O’Neill and was educated at St Munchin's College before proceeding to St. Patrick’s College, Maynooth for his studies for the priesthood. He was ordained priest in June 1915 and remained in Maynooth to prepare for a Doctorate in Divinity.

Catholic Church titles
Preceded by David Keane	Bishop of Limerick; 1946–1958	Succeeded by Henry Murphy
