= John Ryan (bishop) =

Roman Catholic bishop

John Ryan (3 November 1784 in Borris – 4 June 1864 in Limerick) was an Irish Catholic bishop.

Ryan was educated at St Patrick's College, Maynooth and ordained a priest in 1810. He was consecrated Bishop of Limerick on 17 March 1828 and died in post.

Catholic Church titles
Preceded by Charles Tuohy	Bishop of Limerick; 1828–1864	Succeeded by George Butler
