= Ballyagran =

Village in County Limerick, Ireland

Ballyagran Béal Átha Grean
- Village
- Location in Ireland
- Coordinates: 52.4046°N 8.7844°W
- Country: Ireland
- Province: Munster
- County: County Limerick

Area
  - Townland: 1.3 km^{2} (0.50 sq mi)

Population (2022)
  - Total: 166
- Irish grid reference: R467282

Ballyagran (Irish: Béal Átha Grean, meaning 'fordmouth of gravel') is a village and townland in County Limerick, Ireland. As of the 2022 census, the village had a population of 166 people. Ballyagran is also the name of a half-parish in the Roman Catholic Diocese of Limerick.

== History ==
Evidence of ancient settlement within the townland includes a moated ringfort site.

The local Roman Catholic church is dedicated to Saint Michael and was built in 1964 on the site of an earlier 19th century chapel.

Ballyagran's national school opened in 1974.
