= John Dunmow =

John Dunmoe BDec (also Dunmow, Dumoe, Dunow or Dunowe) (died 25 January 1489) was a Canon of Windsor from 1450 to 1455 and Archdeacon of Gloucester from 1487 to 1489 and Bishop of Limerick from 1486 to 1489.

Dunmow is described by Canon Begley as a canon of Exeter, Doctor of Laws and acting as ambassador from Henry VII to the Papal court in Rome. He died in 1489 having never visited his diocese. He is also listed as an auxiliary bishop of the Diocese of Exeter.

== Career ==
He was appointed:

- Rector of Hanworth, Middlesex 1432
- Prebendary of Barnby in York 1475 - 1481
- Rector of St Magnus London Bridge 1481 - 1489
- Archdeacon of Gloucester 1487
- Rector of Church of St Peter ad Vincula 1488
- Bishop of Limerick 1486 - 1489
- King's Proctor at Rome

He was appointed to the ninth stall in St George's Chapel, Windsor Castle in 1476 and held the canonry until 1488.
