= John Butler (Jesuit) =

Styles of NA
- Reference style: The Most Reverend
- Spoken style: My Lord
- Religious style: Bishop

John Butler, S.J. (8 August 1727 – 20 June 1786) was an Irish Roman Catholic priest who was appointed as Bishop of Limerick in 1778 and resigned the position in 1779 without ever being consecrated.

== Biography ==
Father Butler was a member of the prominent Butler dynasty. he was related to James Butler the then Archbishop of Cashel and Metropolitan. This was a source of controversy as Father Butler was unknown in Limerick and it was thought that the Archbishop was using his position to gain an ecclesiastical office for a relative.

Butler joined the Society of Jesus at Liège 1745 and was ordained priest in 1753 (or 1758, sources differ). With the Suppression of the Jesuits in 1773 he moved to England where he was appointed priest in Hereford which was then in the Apostolic Vicariate of the Western District. Father Butler was very surprised to be nominated and initially refused the position. After rejecting the office Fr Butler received another letter informing him that his name had been sent to Rome for approval with the backing of three archbishops and twelve bishops, the Catholic peers of Ireland along with support from several prominent ecclesiastics and Catholic laymen from France. Approval had also been given by his own Ordinary Charles Walmesley Vicar Apostolic of the Western District.

Propaganda Fide which was responsible for appointments of bishops in missionary territory initially rejected Butler's name because of his connection with the Jesuits but Pope Pius VI thought it was in the interest of the faith to appoint Butler and he overruled Propaganda Fide. Fr Butler reluctantly left his parish and went to the family home at Cahir. There he met the Archbishop and a representative of the clergy of Limerick. When the Bull of appointment arrived, however, Butler had second thoughts and he changed his mind. He wrote to the Archbishop and rejected the position. The following month he returned to Hereford where he lived out the remainder of his life.
