= Saint Michael's Catholic Church (Limerick) =

- Church of Saint Michael
- Eaglaís Naomh Micheál
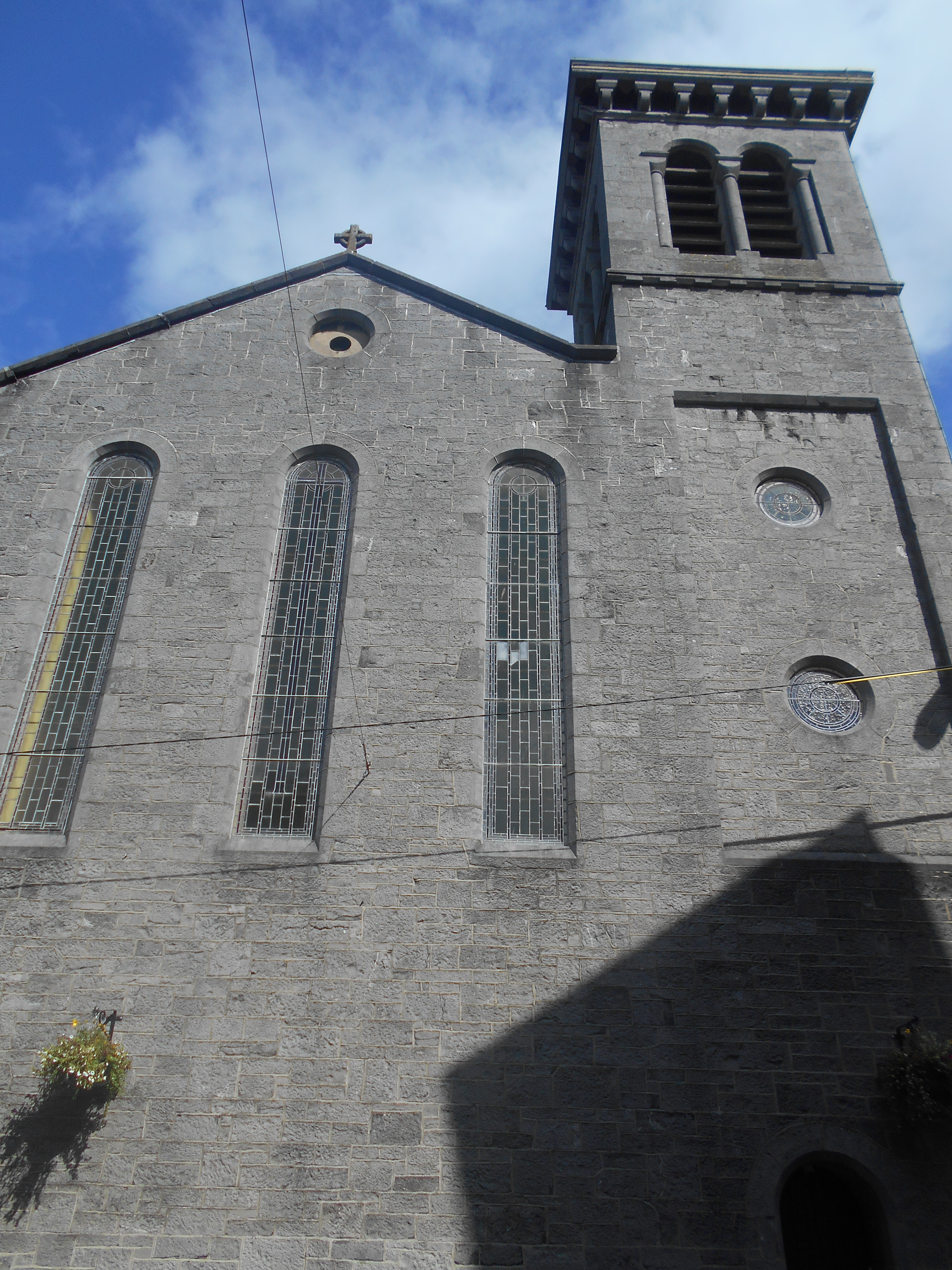
- Exterior walls and tower

- Location within Ireland
- 52°39′50″N 8°37′26″W
- Location: Denmark Street, Limerick
- Country: Ireland
- Language(s): English, Polish
- Denomination: Roman Catholic
- Website: www.limerickdiocese.org/pastoral-units-and-parishes/pastoral-unit-1/st-michaels/

History
- Status: In use
- Dedication: Saint Michael
- Consecrated: August 1874

Architecture
- Architect: Martin Morris
- Architectural type: Church
- Style: Italianate, Romanesque Revival
- Groundbreaking: 1779
- Completed: 1781
- Construction cost: £7,400 (1881 rebuilding)

Administration
- Province: Cashel and Emly
- Diocese: Limerick
- Deanery: Pastoral Unit 1
- Parish: Saint Michael's

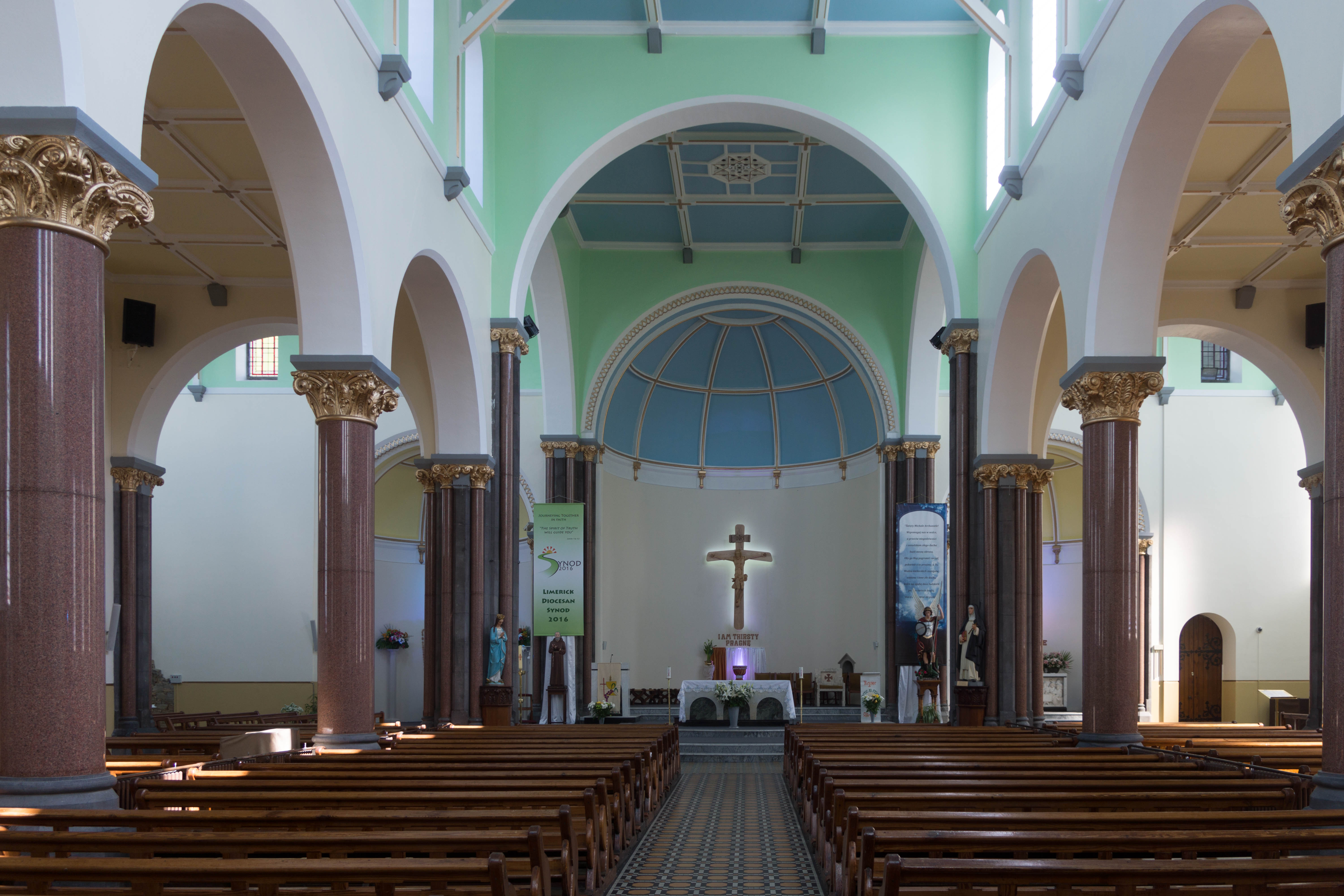
Interior

Saints Michael's Catholic Church is an 18th-century Catholic church located on Chapel Lane in Limerick, Ireland.

It should not be confused with St Michael's Church, a Church of Ireland building on Pery Square.

== History ==
The Anglo-Normans built the first church in Limerick dedicated to Michael the Archangel, which stood on an island between Englishtown and Irishtown, in an area outside the city gates.

Saint Michael's is first referred to in the 1205 "Black Book of Limerick". It was originally a prebendal church, but by 1418 was attached to the Archdeaconry of Limerick.

Saint Michael's is one of the five original parishes of Limerick City. It was a joint parish of Saint John's until 1704 when Father Murtagh O'Hehir became the first Catholic parish priest of the new parish.

The church was built in 1779–81 and remodelled in 1805. It was a rebuilding of a penal-era chapel, demolished after the 1651 siege. The Arthur family donated the land for the original church, which now forms part of the south transept. A bell was added in 1815 and an organ in 1816. The church was rebuilt in 1881 to a design by Martin Morris in an Italianate style with Romanesque Revival features. Daniel O'Connell addressed political meetings in St Michael's. St Michael's also saw the 1916 funeral of the controversial Mayor of Limerick John Daly, and that of Seán South in 1957.

The church has a weekly Mass in Polish, for the Polish immigrant community.

== Architecture ==
The church is a limestone building on a T-shaped plan with a slate roof.

There are two stone fonts dating to c. 1720, one depicting either Mary holding Jesus, or Elizabeth holding John the Baptist; and the other showing Saint Michael. A gilt statue of Saint Michael vanquishing Satan is on top of the building.

=== Gallery ===
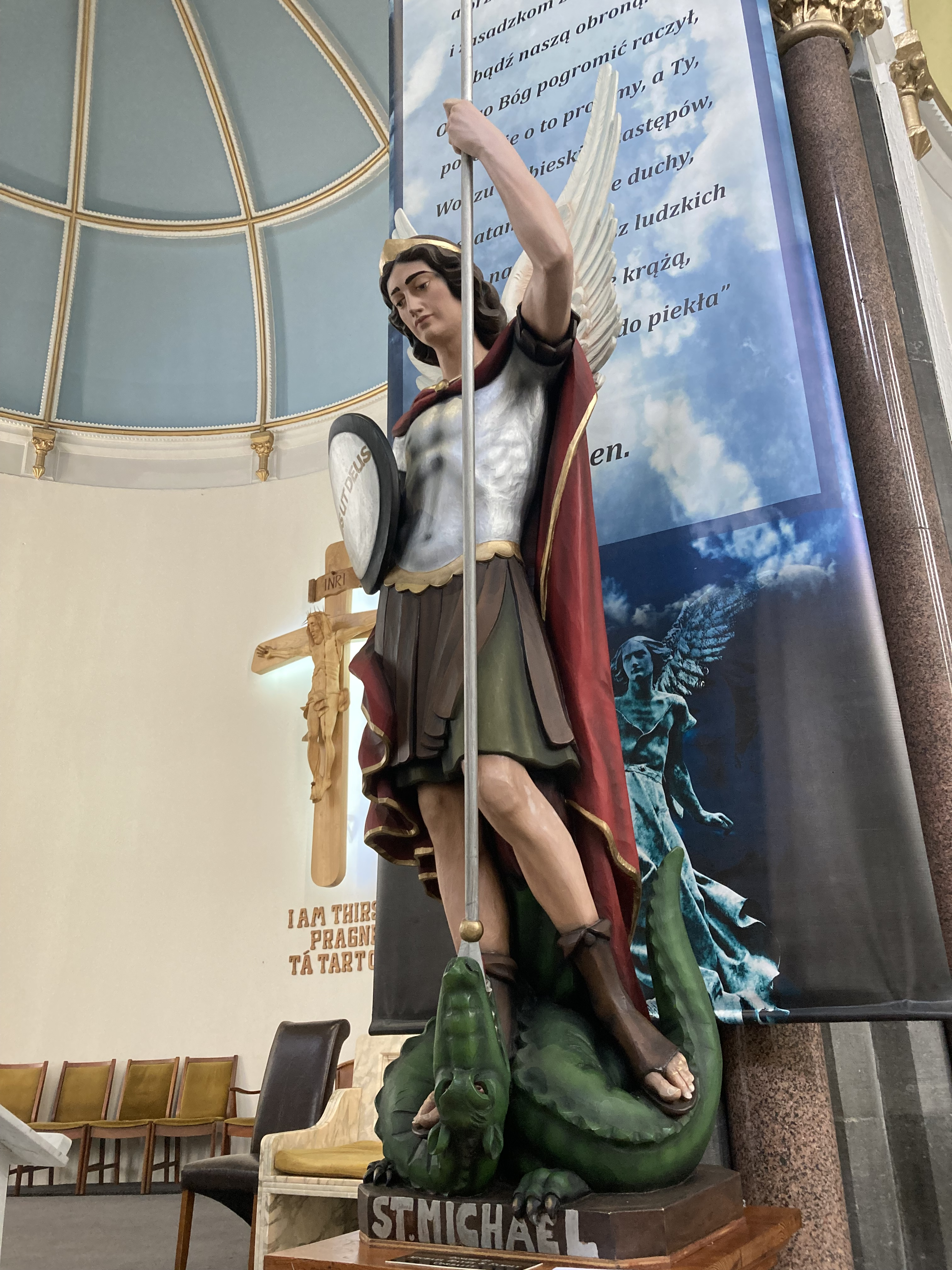
Statue of St Michael

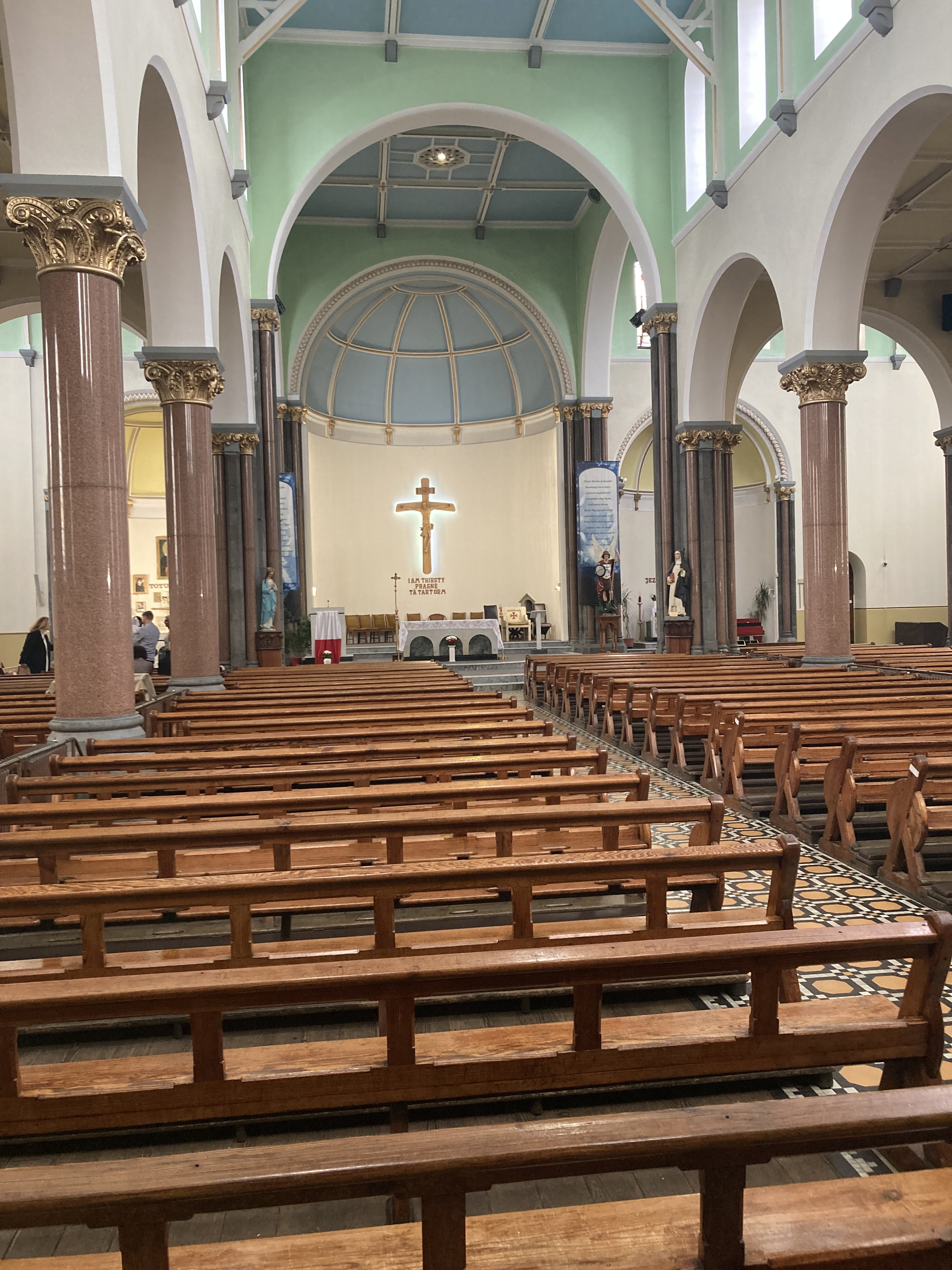
Nave with pews

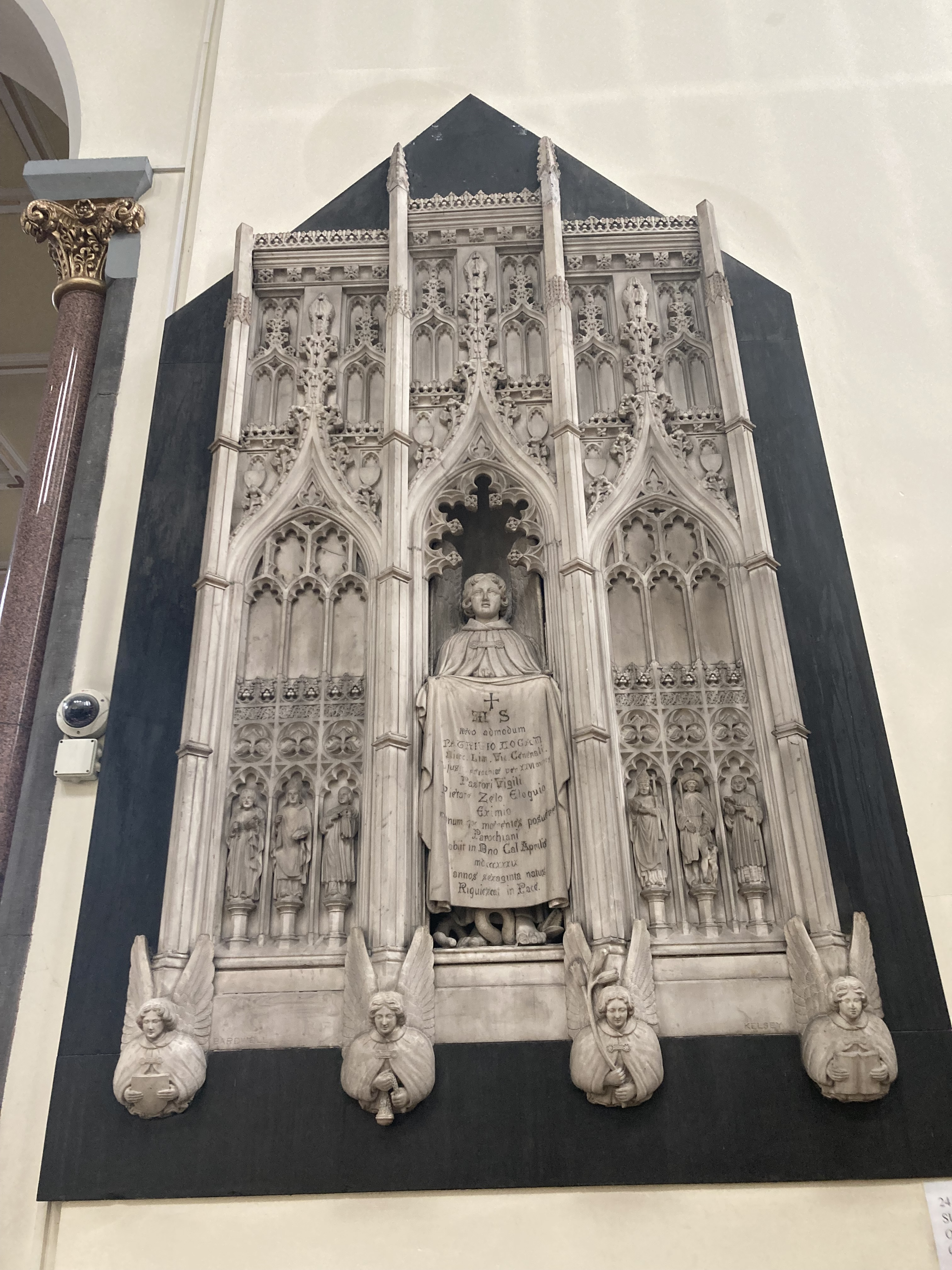
Carved memorial to Very Rev. Patrick Hogan (1769–1829)

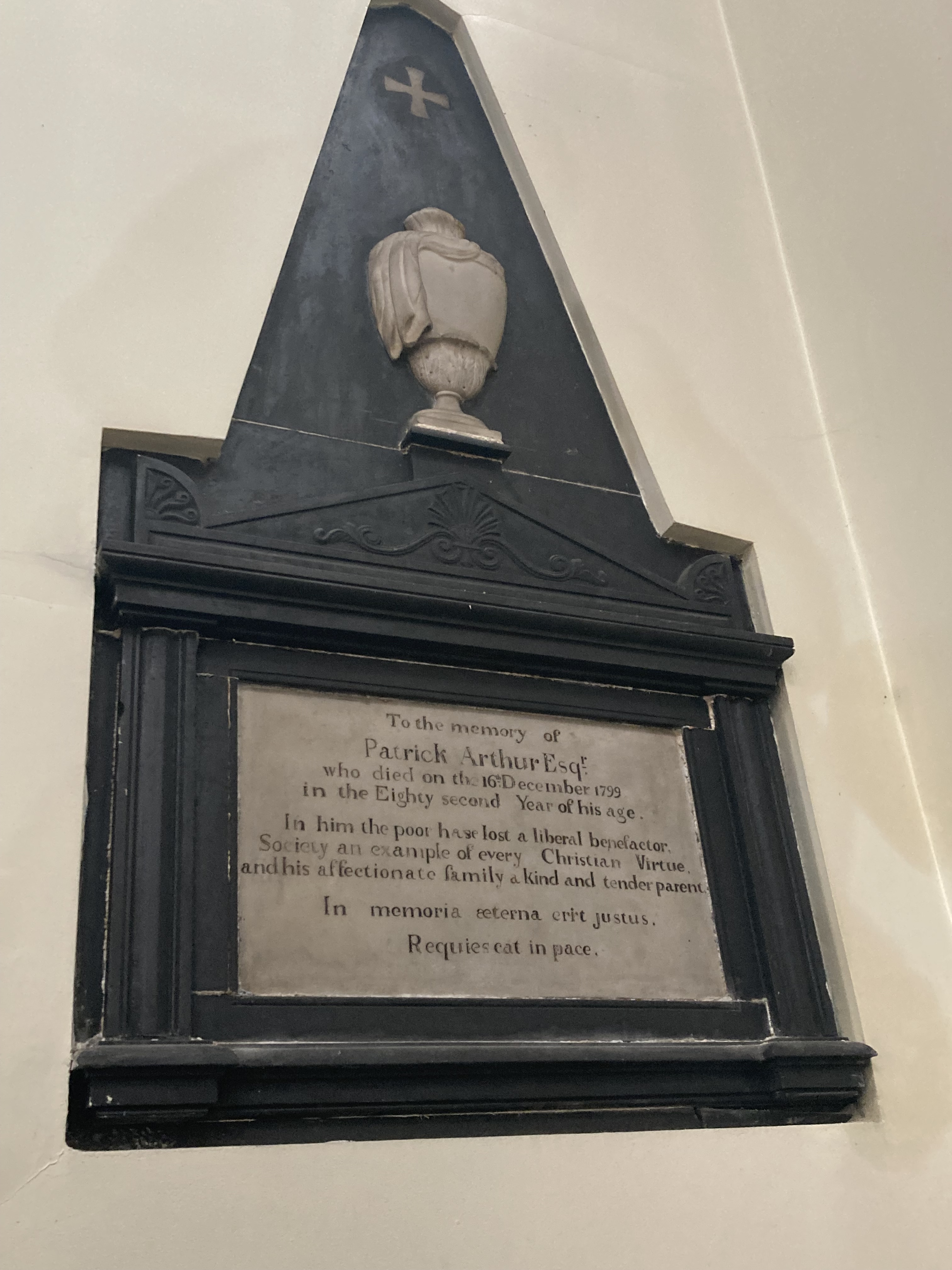
Memorial to Patrick Arthur (1717–1799), for whom Patrick Street is named.

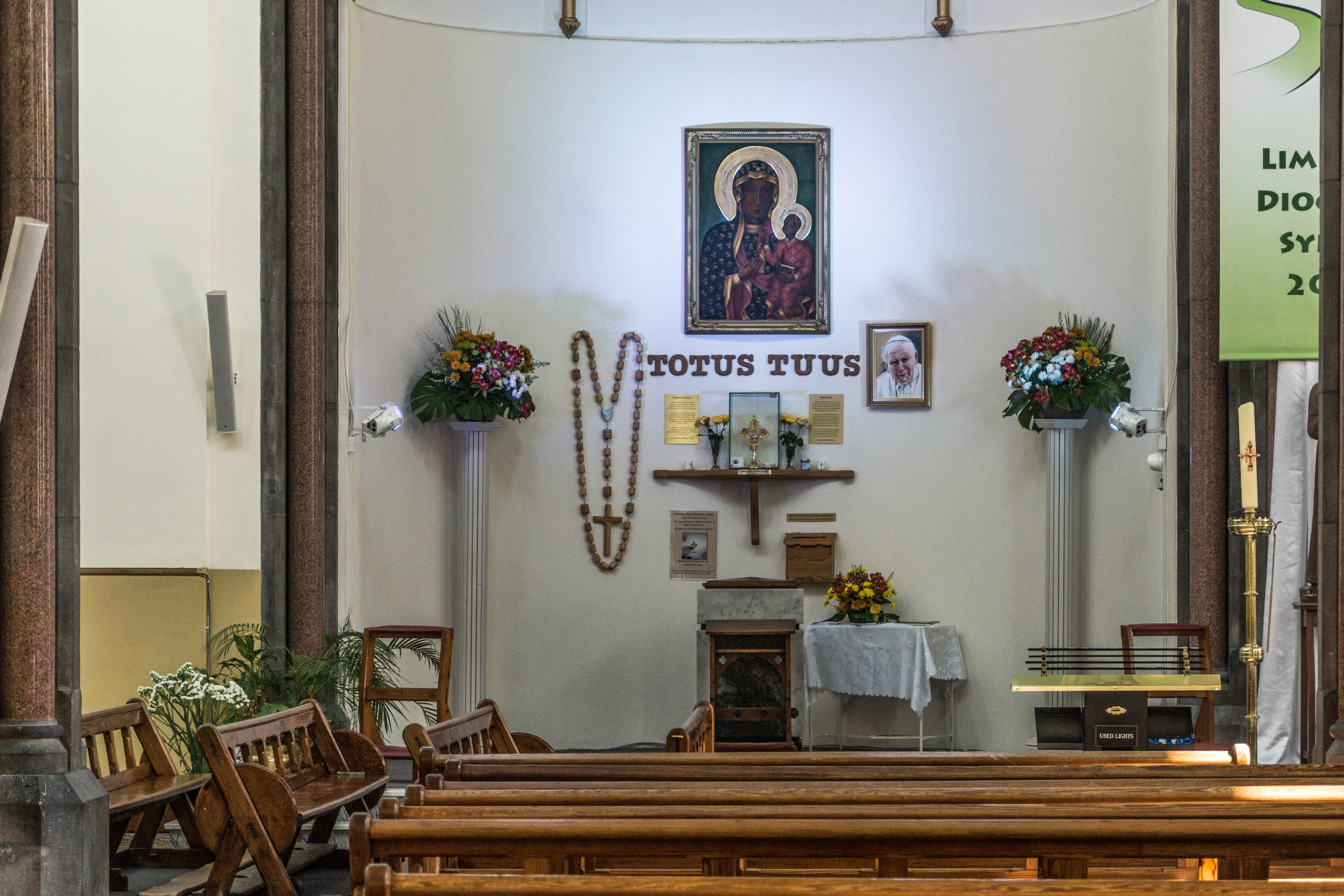
Niche with image of Black Madonna of Częstochowa and legend Totus tuus

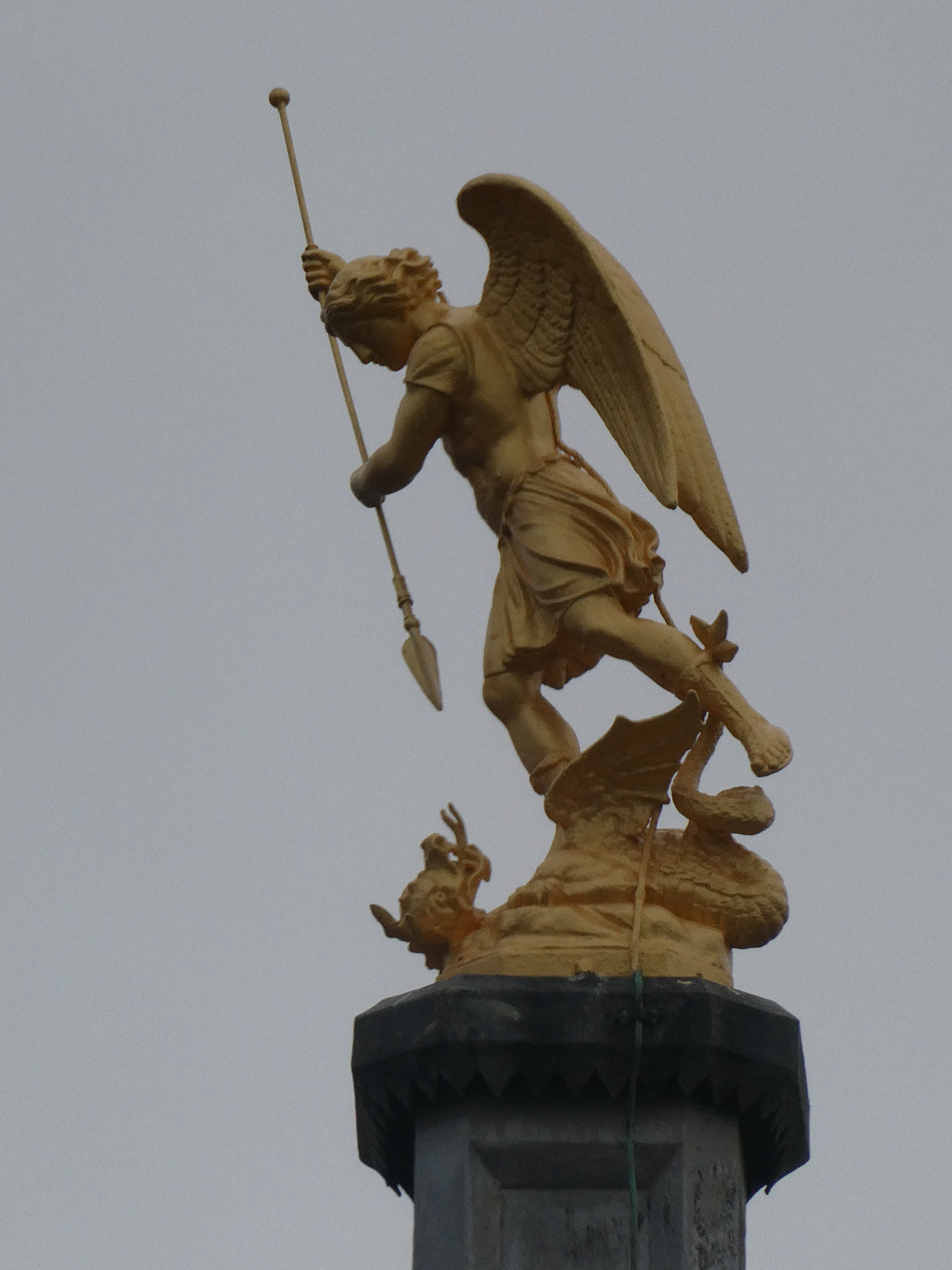
Gilt statue of St Michael atop the church

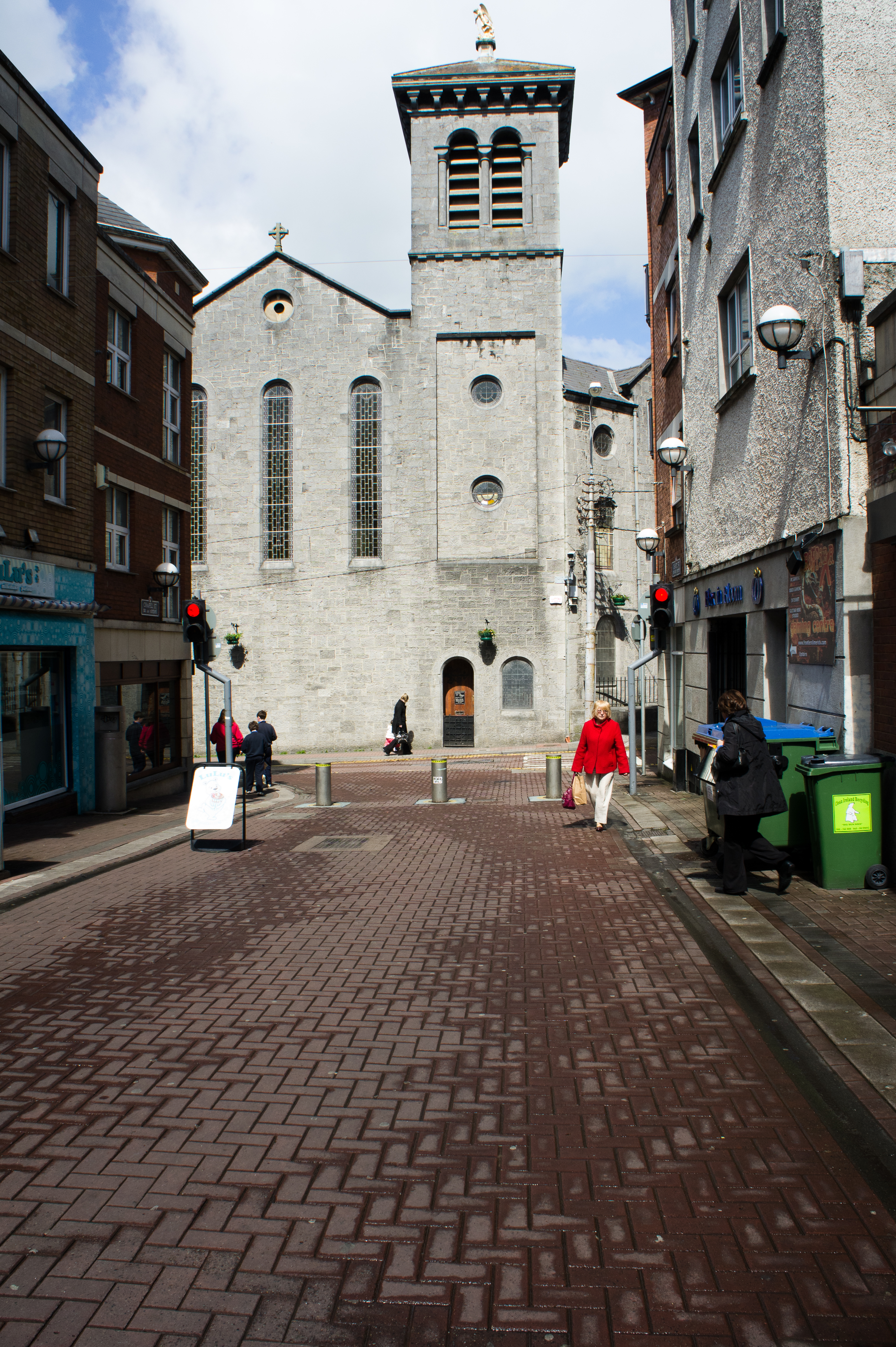
View of facade from Chapel St
