= Timothy Leonard (priest) =

Fr. Timothy Leonard was an Irish priest from Ballysimon, County Limerick. He went as part of the first group of priests from the Maynooth Mission to China in 1920 and he was killed by Communists in July 1929. He was the first Columban Father to be killed on mission.

== Early life ==
Timothy Leonard was born in July 1893 to William (a farmer) and his wife Maryanne Leonard, in the parish of Killmurray, Killronan, Ballysimon, County Limerick. He attended Monaleen National School and later became a boarder at St Munchin's College in Limerick. Leonard studied in Maynooth College and was ordained a priest for the Diocese of Limerick in 1918. Two of his brothers, Joseph and William, also became priests.

== Missionary work and death ==
In 1928, the Holy See assigned the Columbans a new district in the Province of Jiangxi previously ministered by the Vincentians. Fr. Leonard was one of the Columbans who moved to Jiangxi.

In July 1929 after a raid by Communists who had targeted him, as he said mass, he was badly wounded and put "on trial" before three of the Communists in their twenties who acted as judges. He was found guilty of being hostile to the people of China, friendly with the Nationalists, and being a foreign spy. He was taken out thrown on the ground and hacked to death, his body was found on 18 July.
