= Charles Tuohy =

Irish Catholic Bishop

Styles of Charles Tuohy
- Reference style: The Most Reverend
- Spoken style: My Lord
- Religious style: Bishop

Charles Tuohy (1754–1828) was an Irish Roman Catholic prelate who served as the Bishop of Limerick from 1813 to 1828.

== Biography ==
Charles Tuohy was born in Nicholas Street, Limerick, in 1754. Around 1770 he left Ireland to study in the Irish College in Toulouse and later at the Irish College in Paris. This was necessary due to laws outlawing Catholic education at the time. He was ordained in Paris in 1780, and he continued his studies, receiving a Doctorate in Divinity in 1784. He returned to Limerick that year and was appointed a curate in St. John's Parish. In 1796, Bishop Young appointed him to Newcastle West. In 1808 he was appointed PP Rathkeale and subsequently he returned to the city with an appointment to St. Michael's in 1812 where he also became Dean of Chapter. On the death of Bishop Young, he was appointed Bishop of Limerick and was consecrated on 23 April 1815. He was consecrated by Bishop William Coppinger, Bishop of Cloyne and Ross. This was an important period of transition in Irish civil and ecclesiastical history between the Acts of Union 1800 and Catholic emancipation. Tuohy was a tireless worker for the rights of the church and his Catholic flock. He died in his residence, Newtown Villa, Sexton Street, on St. Patrick's Day 1828 and is buried in the same tomb as his predecessor, Bishop Young in the cemetery of St Patrick's Parish.

Catholic Church titles
Preceded by John Young	Bishop of Limerick; 1814 – 1828	Succeeded by John Ryan
