= Jeremiah Newman =

Jeremiah Newman (31 March 1926 – 5 April 1995) was Bishop of Limerick 1974–1995 having served as Professor and President of St Patrick's College, Maynooth.

== Early life and education ==
He was born in Dromcollogher on 31 March 1926 and after a local primary education attended St. Munchin's College, Limerick. He studied for the priesthood at St. Patrick's College, Maynooth and was ordained there on 18 June 1950.

He began postgraduate studies in Philosophy at the Catholic University of Louvain and was awarded a Doctorate in Philosophy there in 1951. After that he took up studies in Sociology at the University of Oxford for four years before taking up a teaching post at Queen's University, Belfast.

== Lecturer in Maynooth College ==
In 1953 Newman was appointed Professor of Sociology at St. Patrick's College, Maynooth, succeeding Peter McKevitt. It was an institution he would remain within, and eventually lead with distinction, until he was appointed Bishop of Limerick in May 1974.

He published two books about the college Maynooth and Georgian Ireland (1979) followed by Maynooth and Victorian Ireland (1983).

== Bishop of Limerick ==
He arrived in Limerick with a strong reputation for reform having served a number of years as President of Maynooth where he adapted and shaped the college to the new challenges of the 1970s. His academic background in sociology gave him an informed understanding of the changing dynamic in Irish life, especially rural life which he has been writing about since the early 1960s especially the dangers of depopulation.

He often made comment on national matters particularly about church-state relations which has been his special area of study for over 20 years. He took what might be called a broadly 'conservative' approach which, as time went on, jarred with wider public opinion especially as Ireland faced a number of constitutional referendums in the 1980s. At least one modern author has quoted the epithet alleged to have been conferred on Dr Newman by Conor Cruise O'Brien 'The Mullah of Limerick" for articulating a neo-conservative position more commonly associated with the United States.

== Death ==
Jeremiah Newman died in office and was the subject of many obituaries not least because of his extensive public statements in his years as Bishop of Limerick. The Tablet suggested he was most "well known for his conservatism and taste for controversial remarks" before quoting the homily by Cardinal Cahal Daly that "he seemed to have a strange sense of inadequacy; and, for one who was so lovable, he seemed to have difficulties in believing that others respected and admired and indeed loved him." The Irish Times obituary said he was a man "who kept fighting the battles of long ago."

He was succeeded as Bishop of Limerick by Bishop Donal Murray.

Limerick City Library holds an extensive set of newspaper articles about Bishop Jeremiah Newman which have been made available online.

== See also ==
- Alumni of St Patrick's Pontifical University, Maynooth
- Peter McKevitt

Catholic Church titles
Preceded by Henry Murphy	Bishop of Limerick; 1974 – 1995	Succeeded by Donal Murray
