= St Munchin's College =

Coordinates: 52°40′56″N 8°36′51″W

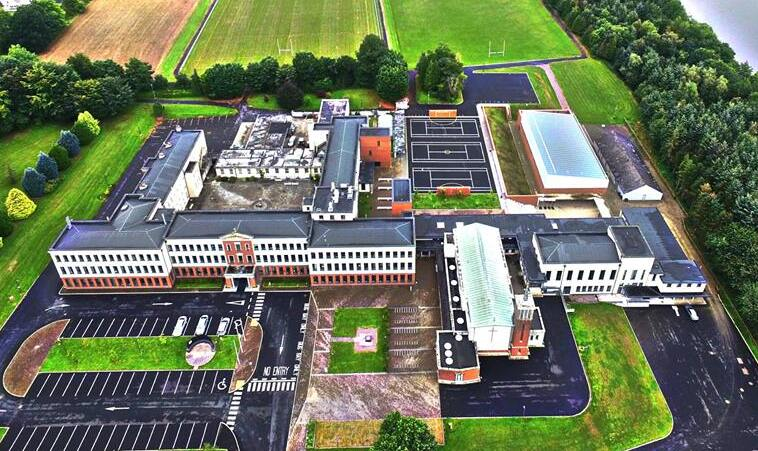
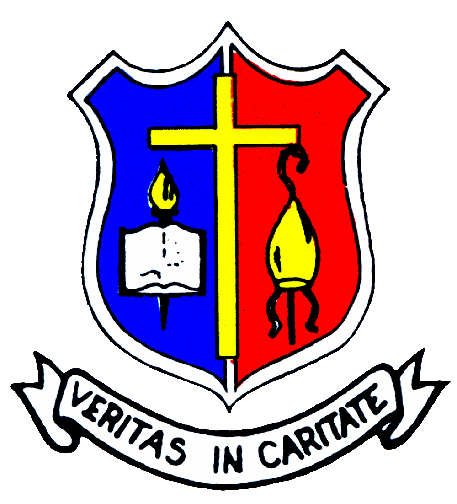
- Aerial view of St Munchin's College School crest

Location
- Corbally Road, Corbally, Limerick, Ireland, V94 HXW5

Information
- Type: Boys–only catholic secondary school
- Motto: "Veritas in Caritate" (If we live by the truth and in love, we shall grow in all ways)
- Religious affiliation: Roman Catholic
- Established: 29 September 1796
- Founder: Most. Rev John Young, (Bishop of Limerick)
- Gender: Boys
- Enrollment: 657 boys (2020)
- Color
- Website: St Munchin's College

St. Munchin's College is a boys–only Roman Catholic secondary school in Limerick, Ireland. It was founded by The Most Reverend John Young, Bishop of Limerick in 1796. In January 2020, a total of 657 boys were enrolled at St. Munchin's College. The current principal of the school is Shane Fitzgerald, and as of July 2025, a total of 662 boys were enrolled at St Munchin's College, a slight increased from the enrolment figures obtained in January 2020.

== History ==
=== Establishment ===
In 1796, St. Munchin's College was established by The Most Reverend John Young, Bishop of Limerick who was the prominent advocate for a new school to be established in Limerick. The school formally opened on 29 September 1796 at Palmerstown within Limerick. Initially, the school curriculum consisted mainly of logic and divinity, and it was considered a prominent seminary for students wishing to study priesthood. In the years which followed, St. Munchin's College began to take the form of a Diocesan College where both laymen and prospective priests were able to pursue their studies collaboratively.

By March 1797, the school moved from Palmerstown to Newgate Lane after only being opened for six months at Palmerstown. Similarly, its tenure at Newgate Lane also proved short, as three years later the school had moved again, this time to Park House in Corbally. In 1825, the Park House facility had closed and was succeeded by the establishment of an academy on Mallow Street by former president of the school, Dr. Carey. St. Munchin’s College was re–established in 1853 by Bishop Ryan and for the first time provided subjects including music, drawing, dancing and painting.

=== Diocesan Seminary of Limerick ===
Bishop Ryan had decided in 1871 to re–establish an educational institution which would be staffed by individuals from the Diocesan clergy, however, it would remain under the full control of the bishop. The parting of the educational institutions of the Jesuits and the Diocese was described as "fairly amicable", with the Jesuit College continuing to use the name St. Munchin’s College, while the new school adopted Diocesan Seminary of Limerick as their name. By 1793, the St. Munchin’s College was dropped in favour of Sacred Heart College, leaving the St. Munchin’s College name to be associated with the school run by the diocese. By the 1880s, both the diocese and the jesuits educational institutions had split.

The school estate received some renovation, and by 1910, a new classhall block was constructed. It became apparent by the 1940s, however, that the school was suffering as a result of inadequate space. There had been proposals for the school to expand into Henry Street, however, the restriction on space made these plans unachievable. Having explored various options to combat the lack of space, a new location for the school was sought.

=== Move to Corbally ===
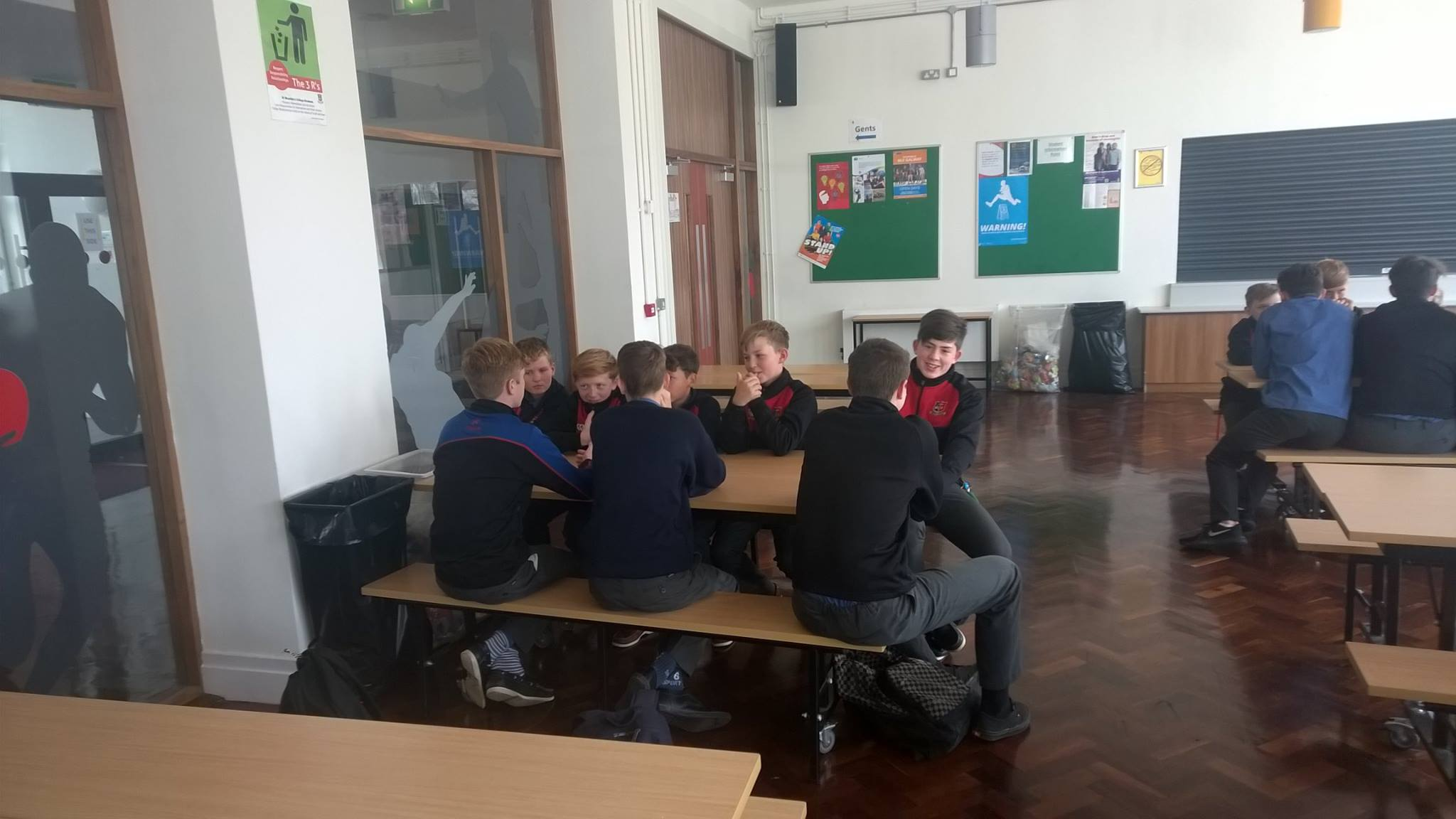
Boys at the Corbally site, 2017

Bishop Patrick O’Neill, a former pupil at the school, suggested to gift the land on which the former bishops residence was situated to the school in order for a new building to be constructed. His suggestion was later acted upon, and building commenced on the new site at Corbally.

The newly constructed St. Munchin’s College at Corbally officially opened to staff and pupils in September 1962, and was opened by President of Ireland, Éamon de Valera, who, whilst attending the opening ceremony, revealed that he had previously sat the entrance exam for the school but failed and was not granted a place. The construction of the new building cost £440,000. Since its construction and opening in 1962, the Corbally site has been refurbished and expanded several times in order to provide facilities fit for modern education. Since opening, new classhalls, a computer room, library and swimming pool have been added to the facilities available at the Corbally site.

=== Recent history ===
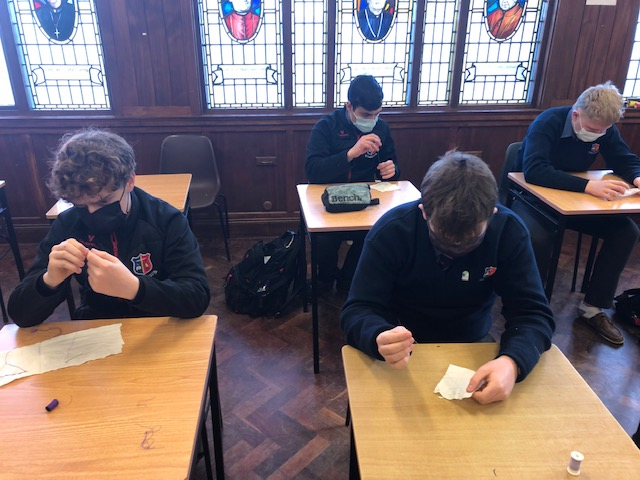
Boys attending the school wearing Face masks during the COVID-19 pandemic

During the COVID-19 pandemic in the Republic of Ireland, along with other schools in the country, St Munchin's College introduced a number of measures to protect staff and boys attending the school. During this time, the school introduced a number of measures and restrictions which included face coverings, sanitation of desks, separate entry and exit points for boys in different year groups and measures to avoid overcrowding in school corridors.

Boys in first and second year were not permitted to obtain lockers during the restrictions, whilst boys in third, fourth, fifth and sixth year were. For boys who were permitted to have lockers, the school issued a strong policy on no sharing of lockers in order to mitigate any risk of infection. Additional measures included enhanced school uniform procedures, including the wearing of sensible shoes as well as enhanced uniform cleaning such as if a uniform had become soiled or dirty. The restrictions also saw the lifting of a rule in which there were separate toilet blocks for boys in the junior and senior schools. Additionally, boys attending the school in first year finished the school day ten minutes earlier than their peers in other years.

Following the lifting of the national lockdown in Ireland, the school had a phased return opening for boys. On 31 August 2020, first and second year boys began attending full time, whilst on 1 September, boys in third and sixth year began and on 2nd September boys in fifth year began. By 3 September, all boys across all year groups had started back full time. During the reopening of the school, it implanted revised procedures around Covid-19 Safety Procedures for Visitors such as the restriction of unscheduled visitors.

== Overview ==
=== College Crest ===
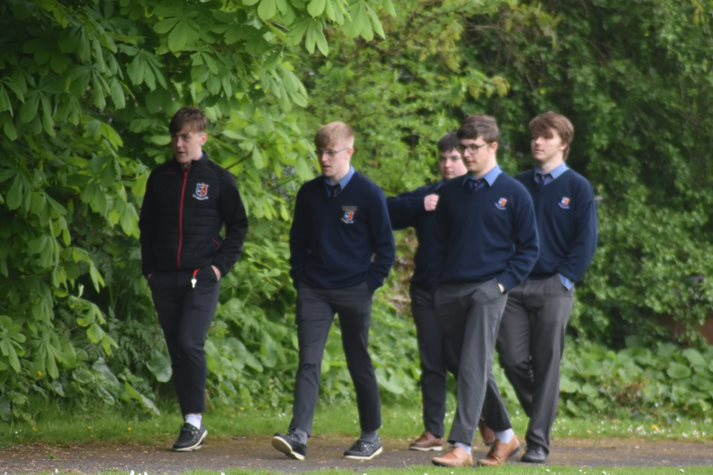
Boys from the school in uniform displaying the crest

The college crest is shield-shaped in blue and red – the college colours. Depicted on it are: a book to show that its function was to be educational, a torch to represent the devil, a cross to show that it was to be Christian and a bishop's mitre and crozier to show that it was to be diocesan. The motto chosen was "Veritas in Caritate" adapted from Bishop Anthony Wood's own episcopal motto. The text is taken from St Paul's Letter to the Ephesians: "If we live by the truth and in love, we shall grow in all ways into Christ." (Eph 4:15)

=== Philosophy ===
The founding philosophy of the school in 1796 was largely intended to prepare boys for seminaries for the Diocese. As this philosophical tradition has evolved since the school was established, it is more considerate of the position the school has in forming leadership for the local church and wider community. Currently, the school advocates for boys to become leaders both in lay and ordained terms within the Diocese of Limerick community.

The school promotes itself as a "caring community" which subscribes to the Christian ideal. It's expectations on the behaviour of boys applies when boys are physically in the school building or on school grounds, whilst wearing their school uniform in a public space, any occasion when boys are representing the schools at community events, whilst traveling to and from the school and are in public spaces, when representing the school is sports activities or when alongside staff from the school. The school had adopted a code of behaviour which is based on its educational philosophy, reflecting the "ethos and characteristic spirit of St. Munchin’s College". The school encourages all boys to be respectful to others, and recognises such instances of being unable to provide their school journal when asked, wearing non uniform clothing or jewellery, the wearing of make up and unacceptable hair cuts which would result in an automatic suspension and abusive or disrespectful language as unacceptable forms of behaviour.

A card system has been introduced in the school and is designed to ensure positive behaviour across the school. It consists of three levels – Green Card for minor breaches of the school, Yellow Card for intermediate offences and Red Card for serious breaches of the behavioural code. Boys failing to produce homework, having no appropriate materials in class, poor punctuality and low level disruptive behaviour such as whispering and talking to others during classroom instruction would warrant a yellow card, whilst unacceptable language would warrant a yellow and more serious offences such as bullying and refusal to follow instructions would result in a red.

=== Boarding facilities ===
Previously having had facilities to boys to attend the school on a boarding basis, the facility closed in 2004 after the last cohort of nineteen boys completed their examinations. Boarding facilities at the school originally opened in 1888 alongside day school and seminary for ecclesiastical students facilities.

=== Admissions and curriculum ===
Admissions for boys at St. Munchin’s College is welcomed for any boy for who the school can provide an appropriate education, with the school aiming to "provide an integrated and an inclusive education". For admissions, the schools Board of Management applies selection criteria which consider whether a boy has completed sixth class in primary school, be willing to accept the school ethos and be willing to accept the school Code of Behaviour. Additionally, for successful admission to the school, prospective boys are required to undertake an assessment test.

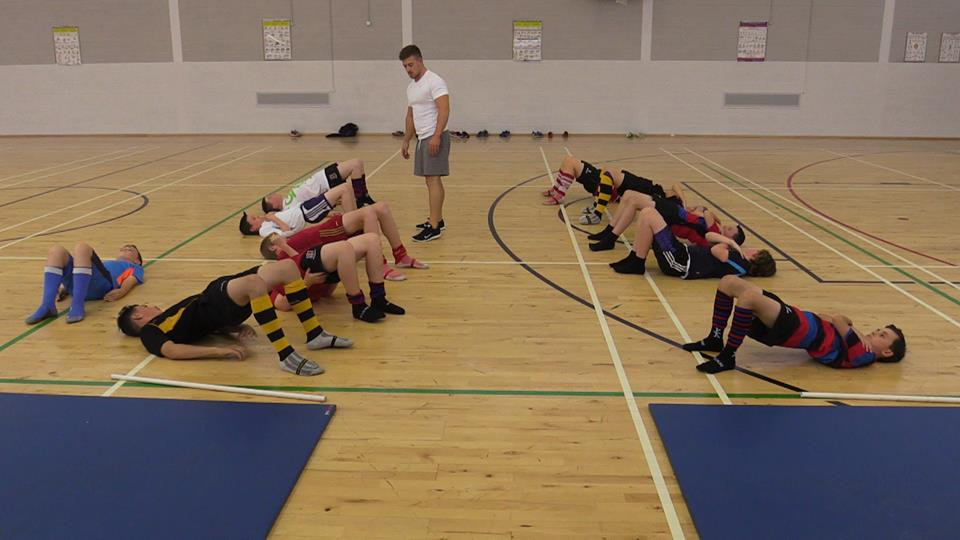
A PE lesson at the school

In instances where the school receives a greater number of applications than places available, the school will deploy a specific set of criteria to determine which boys receive a place at the school. Such criteria would consist of boys who are nominated by the College Trustees having regard to the Ethos of the School, Sons, Grandsons and Nephews of current and former staff members who are or have been employed by the Board of Management, boys who have a brother currently attending St. Munchin’s College or have had a brother attended who has since graduated and boys whose fathers are past pupils.

In the school, there are two "bicycles" in which boys attending complete – the junior cycle which lasts for three years, and the senior cycle which lasts for two years.

In the junior cycle, the curriculum offered to boys consists of the subjects of Religion, Gaeilge, English, Maths, History, Geography, Science, Business Studies, French, German, Art Technical Graphics, S.P.H.E, C.S.P.E., P.E., Computer Studies, Technology, Wellbeing, Coding and Digital Media. Within the senior cycle, curriculum subjects consist of mainly the same subjects, with the addition of Applied Maths, Economics, Guidance Counselling, Accounting, Business, Physics, Chemistry, Biology, D.C.G. and LCVP.

=== Sport and extra–curricular ===
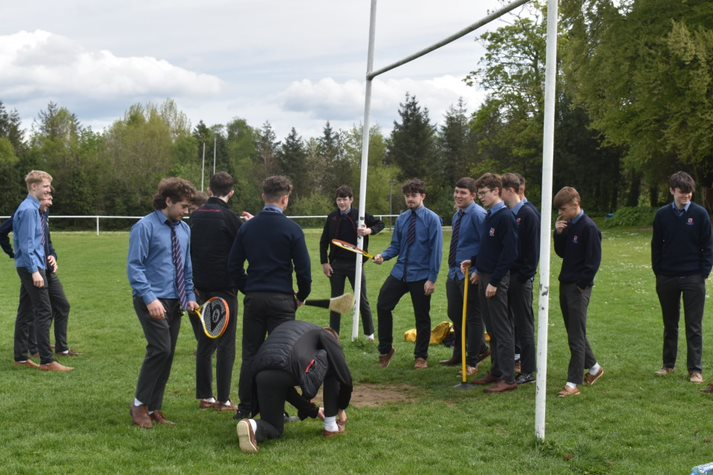
Boys on the rugby pitch

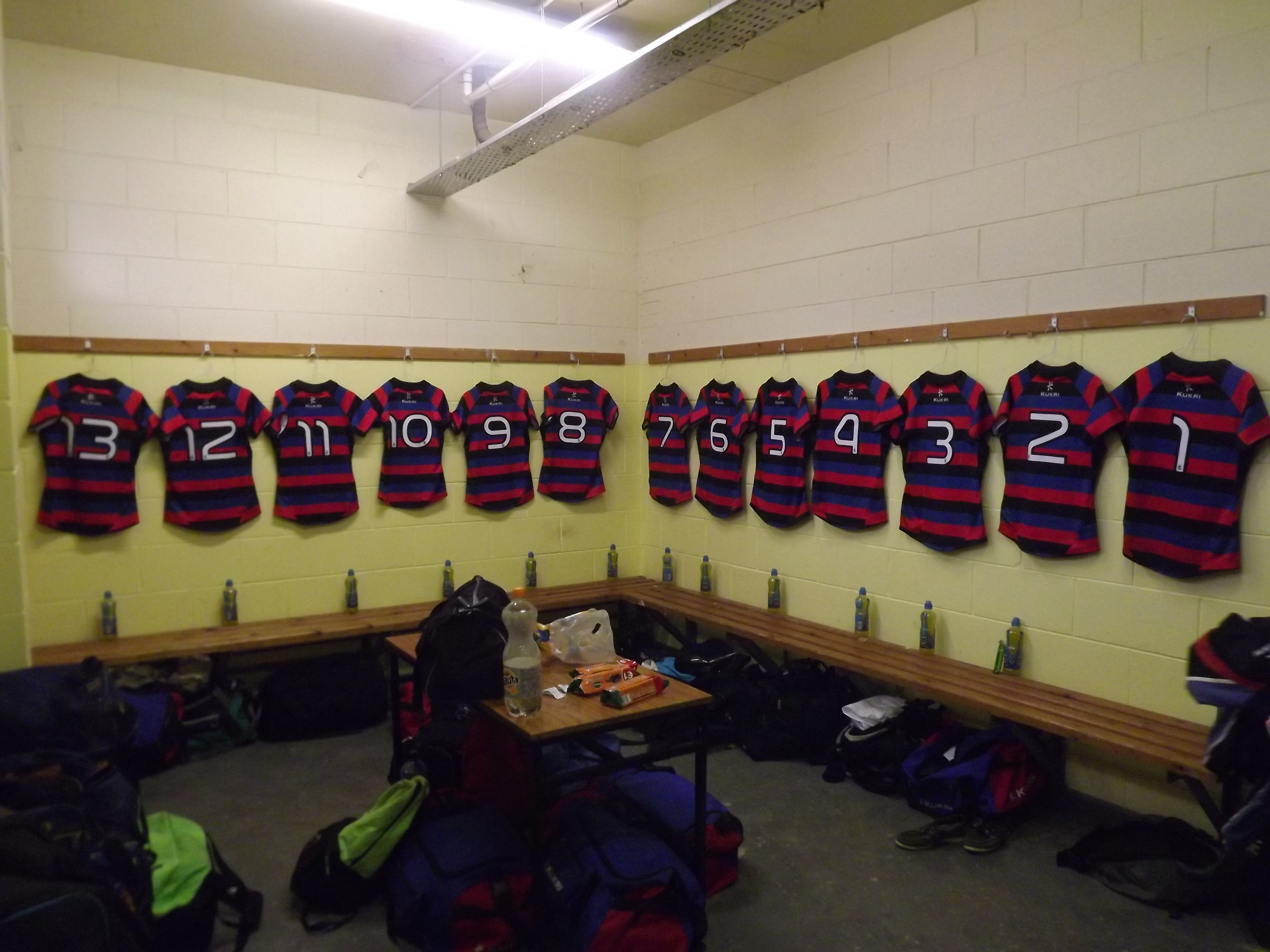
School sports colours ahead of the Junior & Senior cup

The school has a strong history in the sport of Squash and is considered a "nursery" for the development of new talent within the sport. The schools squash team participates in the Junior Cup, the Bowen Shield and the Senior Cup. The schools basketball team is affiliated with Basketball Ireland which provides support in refereeing games and provides training sessions across Ireland. In 2014, the Under–16 and Under–19 basketball teams won both the All Ireland schools cup in their respective categories, and in 2016, the Under–16 team reached the All Ireland quarter final, whilst the Under–19 team reached the semi-final. Additional sports in which boys can participate in include hurling, athletics, rowing and gaelic football.

St. Munchin’s College provides a variety of artistic, cultural, social and sporting activities for boys to partake, which aims to "develop the talents of all students and to provide them with the confidence to be involved in various activities in later life". The school commits to the development of team games for all its students. Extra–curricular activities include Rugby, Hurling, Gaelic Football, Basketball, Athletics, Golf, Quizzes, Tours, Charitable Works Drama and Musical, Talent Competition, Limerick Diocesan Lourdes Pilgrimage, Public Speaking and Debating and various Leadership Opportunities.

== Alumni ==
- George Clancy (born 1977), international rugby referee
- Niall Collins TD (born 1973), Fianna Fáil member of Dáil Éireann for Limerick County since 2007
- Edmond Cotter (1852–1934), FA Cup finalist with Royal Engineers, British Army officer, Irish Volunteer
- Neil Cronin (born 1992), former full time teacher at At Munchin's College, currently playing for Munster in the Pro14 and has a 1-year contract with Munster (2018–2019)
- Neil Cusack (born 1951), long-distance runner and Olympian, only Irishman to win the Boston Marathon.
- Philip Danaher (born 1965), former Irish international and Munster rugby player
- Keith Earls (born 1987), Munster, Ireland and British and Irish Lions rugby player
- Denis Hurley (born 1984), Munster and Irish international rugby player
- John Fitzgerald (born 1961), former Irish international and Munster rugby player
- Niall FitzGerald KBE (born 1945), former chairman and CEO of Unilever plc until his appointment as Chairman of Reuters in 2004
- Jerry Flannery (born 1978), former Ireland and Munster rugby player
- John Fleming (born 1948), appointed Catholic Bishop of Killala Diocese, County Mayo, Ireland in 2002
- Anthony Foley (1973–2016), Ireland and Munster player
- Colm Galvin (born 1993), Clare hurler and legend
- Dan Goggin (born 1994), Munster rugby player
- John Gormley (born 1959), leader of the Green Party (Ireland) was appointed Minister for the Environment, Heritage and Local Government in the Irish Government of 2007
- Fr. Edward Joseph Hannan, founder of Hibernian F.C.
- Marcus Horan (born 1977), Ireland and Munster rugby player
- Richard Hourigan (1939–2002), former Fine Gael Senator
- Stephen Keogh (born 1982), former Munster and Leinster rugby player
- Fergal Lawler (born 1971), drummer with The Cranberries
- Fr. Tim Leonard (1893–1929), Columban Father violently killed by Communists in China in 1929.
- David McHugh (born 1955), international rugby referee
- Bill Mulcahy (1935-2025), former Munster, Leinster, Ireland and British and Irish Lions rugby player
- Barry Murphy (born 1982), former Munster and Irish international rugby player, member of Irish acoustic folk rock band Hermitage Green
- Conor Murray (born 1989), rugby player, Munster, Ireland and British and Irish Lions
- Jeremiah Newman (1926–1995), Bishop of Limerick, President of St Patrick's College, Maynooth
- Tim O'Connor (born 1951), Irish Public Servant and Diplomat. Tim was part of the Irish Government Negotiating Team for the Good Friday Agreement
- Kieran O'Donnell (born 1963), member of Seanad Éireann, Fine Gael member of Dáil Éireann for Limerick City 2011–2016
- Donal O'Grady (born 1980), Limerick hurler and captain
- Bishop Patrick O'Neill, former bishop of limerick
- Niall O'Shaughnessy (1955–2015), Olympic middle-distance runner
- Frank O'Mara (born 1960), Olympic middle-distance runner
- Sean O Riada (1931–1971), composer
- Éamonn 'Ned' Rea (1944-2021), All-Ireland winning Limerick hurler
- Donnacha Ryan (born 1983), Munster and Irish international rugby player
- Jeremy Staunton (born 1980), Munster, Irish and Aviva Premiership rugby player
- Colm Tucker (1952–2012), former Munster, Irish international and Lions rugby player
- Damien Varley (born 1983), Munster rugby player
- Dick Walsh (1934–2005), journalist, political, and assistant editor The Irish Times
- Keith Wood (born 1972), former rugby player for Munster, Ireland and the British and Irish Lions. Winner of IRB International Player of the Year in 2001
