= St John's Cathedral (Limerick) =

- Ardeaglais Naomh Eoin
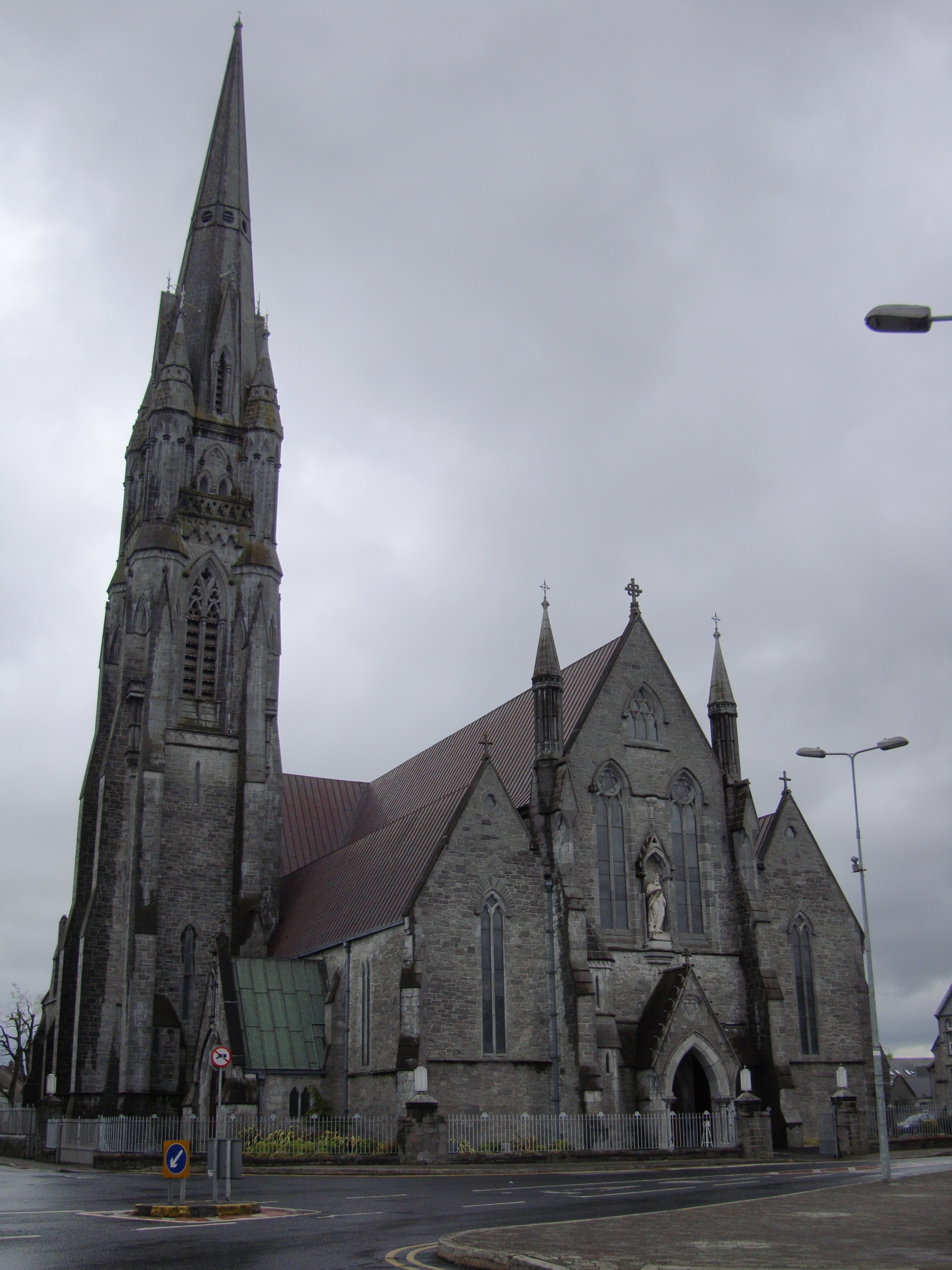

- Location in Ireland
- 52°39′45″N 8°37′00″W
- Location: Cathedral Place, Limerick, Ireland
- Denomination: Roman Catholic
- Website: https://www.limerickcathedral.com/

History
- Status: Cathedral
- Consecrated: June 1894

Architecture
- Style: Gothic Revival
- Years built: 1856–1882
- Groundbreaking: 1 May 1856
- Completed: 1882

Specifications
- Materials: limestone,

Administration
- Province: Cashel and Emly
- Diocese: Limerick
- Parish: Cathedral

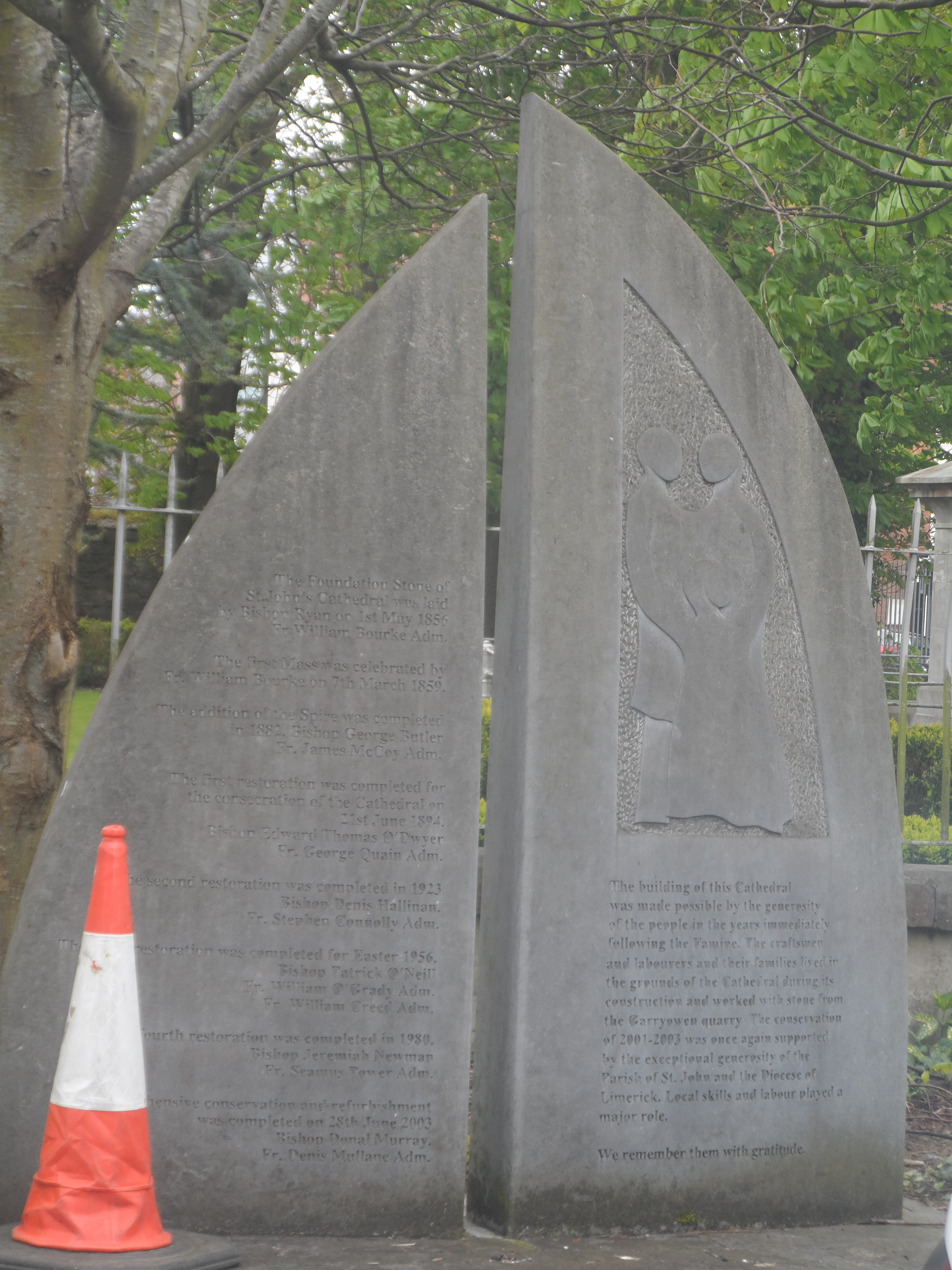
Stone commemorating the construction and restorations of the cathedral.

St. John's Cathedral (Irish: Ardeaglais Naomh Eoin) is a Roman Catholic cathedral in Limerick, Ireland. Designed by the architect Philip Charles Hardwick, ground was broken in 1857 and the first Mass celebrated on 7 March 1859. It replaced a chapel founded in 1753.

== History ==
Between 1855 and 1861, the English architect Philip Charles Hardwick was commissioned to design the cathedral. At the time he was engaged in some work on Adare Manor. On 1 May 1856 the foundation stone was laid, and the building was consecrated in 1859 but remained unfinished until July 1861. The building of the original structure was undertaken by Patrick Kenna, Glentworh Street. Thomas Byrne undertook the later construction of the tower and spire from 1879. Construction of the tower was delayed by storm damage in September 1882. Following interior renovations, on 21 June 1894 the cathedral was consecrated by Cardinal Logue. A large portion of the original pews, memorials, confessionals, and floor tiles survive. The Bishop's throne or cathedra was produced in Munich in 1894, and has since been removed.

== Architecture ==
Hardwick was influenced by his time under Augustus Pugin, which can be seen in the Gothic Revivalist style of the cathedral. M.A. Hennessy adapted Hardwick's sketches for the tower, which was constructed between 1879 and 1883, with Hennessy adding 105 feet to the original design. The building is faced using local limestone. The tower was believed to be one of the tallest in Ireland when it was completed.

The overall architecture has been described as "severe" with minimal external decoration, and small windows. There is just one statue featured on the façade. In comparison, the tower and spire have more decorative adornments.

Between 1893 and 1894, the interior was renovated by Bishop Edward Thomas O'Dwyer which included a reordering of the sanctuary inspired by St Chad's Cathedral, Birmingham. This work was undertaken by Walter Doolin and Messrs Ryan, Limerick. The interior was again amended to take account changes relating to Vatican II.

The altar is constructed using Limerick marble and features a carving depicting the sacrifice of Abraham.

== Restoration ==
The most recent restoration work carried out was in 2003/2004 on the roof and exterior stonework. It is a Roman Catholic cathedral, the city's original cathedral, St. Mary's Cathedral, being Anglican. The building was claimed to have the tallest spire in Ireland at 94 m (308 ft), but a modern measurement showed it is only 81 m (266 ft), shorter than St. Colman's Cathedral, Cobh.

== See also ==
- List of tallest churches
- List of tallest structures in Ireland
