= Sexual abuse scandal in the Roman Catholic Archdiocese of Dublin =

Sexual abuse cases in Ireland

Archdiocese of Dublin Archidioecesis Dublinensis Ard-Deoise Bhaile Átha Cliath
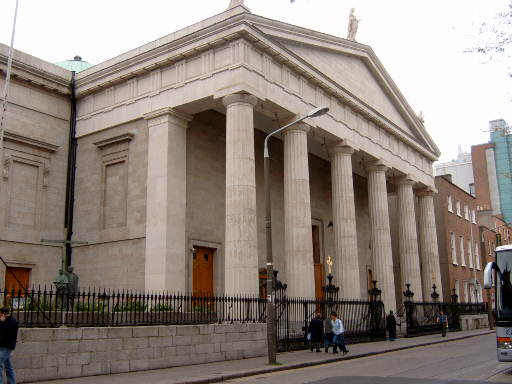
- St Mary's Pro-Cathedral, Dublin

Location
- Country: Ireland
- Territory: City of Dublin, most of counties Dublin and Wicklow, and parts of counties Carlow, Kildare, Laois and Wexford
- Ecclesiastical province: Province of Dublin

Statistics
- Area: 1,229 sq mi (3,180 km^{2})
- Population: Total; Catholics: (as of 2013); ▲1,485,521; ▲1,154,296 (▼77.7%)

Information
- Denomination: Catholic
- Rite: Latin Rite
- Established: Diocese in 1028; Archdiocese in 1152
- Cathedral: St Mary's Pro-Cathedral, Dublin
- Patron saint: St Kevin and St Laurence O'Toole

Current leadership
- Pope: Leo XIV
- Archbishop: Diarmuid Martin
- Vicar General: Msgr. Paul Callan
- Bishops emeritus: Raymond W. Field

Map
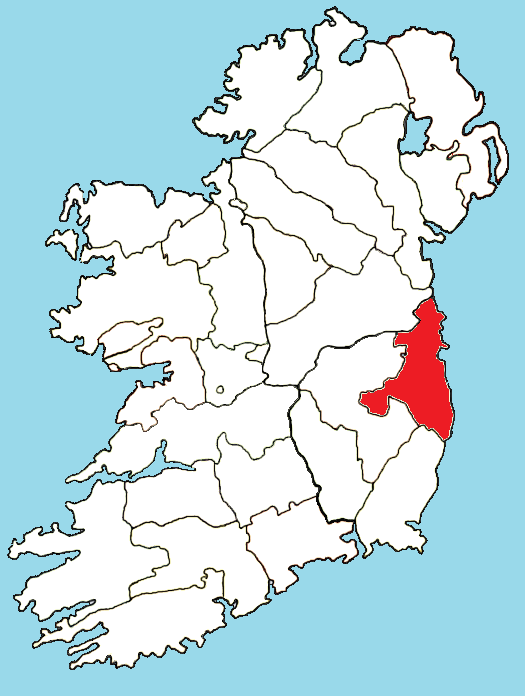

Website
- dublindiocese.ie

The sexual abuse cases in Dublin archdiocese are major chapters in the series of Catholic Church sexual abuse cases in Ireland. The Irish government commissioned a statutory enquiry in 2006 that published the Murphy Report in November 2009.

== Handling by senior clergy ==
=== Allegations against Archbishop McQuaid ===
In his biography of the archbishop, John Charles McQuaid Ruler of Catholic Ireland, John Cooney relates a number of stories which suggest that the Archbishop had an unhealthy interest in children. The main allegation – that the Archbishop had attempted to sexually assault a boy in a Dublin pub – is based on an unpublished essay by Noel Browne. No reputable historian or journalist supports these claims. Even reviewers who praised the book, including Dermot Keogh, Professor of History, and John A. Murphy, Emeritus Professor of History at University College Cork, have stated that the author should not have included the allegations.

There is a satirical account of the controversy by then Irish Times journalist, Kevin Myers, in his "Irishman's Diary" on 10 November 1999. There is also an interesting account by Colum Kenny, Associate Professor of Communications at Dublin City University of a meeting he had with the Archbishop as a teenager in the 1960s. Although his attitude to Dr. McQuaid is hostile, he regards Cooney's allegations as absurd.

On 20 June 2009, it was revealed that in 1961 Archbishop McQuaid had established a hostel in Dublin for boys who had been in industrial schools – mainly Artane – and assigned priests to see to their spiritual welfare and to help them integrate into society. In the mid-1960s, one of these priests was the young Diarmuid Martin who went on to become Archbishop of Dublin in 2004 and to take a strong line against alleged clerical abusers.

=== Official secrecy under bishop Ryan ===
Whilst archbishop of Dublin, Dermot Ryan continued McQuaid's coverup in relation to clerical abuse. He protected the institution of the Church at all costs instead of caring for the victims of abuse. The 2009 Report found that – "During the period under review, there were four Archbishops – Archbishops McQuaid, Ryan, McNamara and Connell. Not one of them reported his knowledge of child sexual abuse to the Gardaí throughout the 1960s, 1970s, or 1980s."

=== Role of Archbishop McNamara ===
In the early 2000s, amid growing scandals within the Catholic Church in Ireland about clerical sex abuse, it was revealed that then-Archbishop Kevin McNamara had sought legal advice as to the Church's liability arising from such abuse. As a result of the advice, McNamara insured the archdiocese to protect it financially, while not revealing the degree of clerical sex abuse recorded in diocesan files to the Garda Síochána as required in law. McNamara's role in these and other incidents were featured in an audit of child abuse cases associated with the Dublin archdiocese carried out at the request of Archbishop Diarmuid Martin.

=== Actions of Cardinal Connell ===
The failure of Cardinal Desmond Connell to adequately address the abuse scandals in Dublin led the Vatican to replace him with Archbishop Martin in the country's largest diocese. Connell's tenure as Primate was marked by recurring and unchecked episodes of child sex abuse by priests and other religious personnel in the Archdiocese of Dublin. His oversight of this was examined by the Commission of Investigation into Child Sexual Abuse in the Dublin Archdiocese, set up by the Irish Government. Connell gave evidence to the commission in late 2006.

Connell had also provided Ivan Payne with a loan of £30,000 in 1993 to satisfy an out-of-court settlement with an abused victim.

=== Archbishop Martin ===
In an unprecedented homily for Holy Thursday, Archbishop Diarmuid Martin warned that the depth of the abuse would "shock us all". He later said that there was a growing rift between the Church and younger generations, and that the blame does not lie principally with young people.

== Individual cases ==
=== Vincent Mercer ===
Although his offences were committed in the Diocese of Kildare and Leighlin, Vincent Mercer has found refuge in Tallaght. He is a Dominican and former headmaster of Newbridge College Co Kildare. He was convicted in 2003 and 2005 for sexually assaulting 13 boys. The Dominican Order was aware of abuse allegations against Mercer when these came to light in 1995 and sheltered him until his 2003 jail sentence. He was given a sentence of six months imprisonment in 2003 after pleading guilty at Naas District Court to four counts of indecent assault on a 13-year-old boy. In 2005, he was convicted of 13 sample charges of indecently assaulting eight boys aged 10–13, between 1970 and 1977, and received a three-year suspended prison sentence.

In November 2012 Mercer was arrested again on 39 charges of sexually assaulting a juvenile between 1 January 1986 and 22 February 1994, he was remanded on a bond of €2,500 and instructed to sign on twice weekly at Kilkenny Garda Station and stay with the Dominicans at Black Abbey and on 10 January Inspector Mary King applied to have him returned for trial by judge and jury to the next sitting of Cork Circuit Criminal Court on 4 February and Judge Con O'Leary granted the application. Another child abuser was known to have been a priest in the college some years before Mercer; although this article http://www.duluthnewstribune.com/opinion/local-view/3720465-local-view-retired-duluthian-still-healing-after-abuse-life-shame-and failed to name him, any pupil from that era would know who he was as he was sent to India by the Dominicans when things got too embarrassing for them. In February 2013, Mercer was sentenced to three years in prison after pleading guilty at Cork Circuit Criminal Court to 15 sample counts of sexually assaulting the boy on various dates between 1986 and 1994.

=== Paul McGennis ===
Paul McGennis, a priest of the Archdiocese of Dublin pleaded guilty to two charges of sexually assaulting two girls at Our Lady's Children's Hospital, Crumlin, Dublin when he was chaplain there in 1960. He pleaded guilty in 1997 to two charges of assaulting a nine-year-old girl in County Wicklow between 1977 and 1979.

McGennis abused M Collins when as a 13-year-old she was in Our Lady's Hospital for Sick Children in 1961. Collins was later told that McGennis had admitted abusing children. When Collins approached Cardinal Desmond Connell in 1995 about the abuse she endured in 1960, Connell told her in 1996 that the archdiocese would not co-operate with the Garda Síochána in the investigation and he refused to confirm the priest's admission to the assaults – despite the Irish bishops' strict guidelines for reporting complaints of clerical child abuse to the civil authorities. McGennis was nevertheless convicted and imprisoned. Collins subsequently received an apology from Connell for his refusal to co-operate in 1996.

=== Noel Reynolds ===
Fr. Noel Reynolds was a priest of the Archdiocese of Dublin who died in 1997. He served as curate in eight parishes including Rathcoole, parish priest of Glendalough, County Wicklow and finally as chaplain at the National Rehabilitation Centre, Dún Laoghaire, County Dublin.

Connell admitted he knew about the "inappropriate behaviour" of Reynolds two years before he reassigned him from a parish to a hospital chaplaincy, and three years before he finally removed him from duty. A colleague of Reynold's, Fr. Arthur O'Neill, revealed he had reported concerns about Reynolds while he was parish priest of Rathnew, Co Wicklow, and Reynolds was parish priest in neighbouring Glendalough, but Reynolds was allowed to continue his duties.

=== Thomas Naughton ===
Fr Thomas Naughton is a priest of St Patrick's Missionary Order, Kiltegan, County Wicklow. He molested many children in the various parishes he served. He was convicted of abusing an altar boy in Donnycarney and sentenced to three years in prison, reduced on appeal to six months. He attended a treatment centre at Our Lady of Victory, Stroud, Gloucestershire which offers 'therapy in a spiritual context' before his conviction

=== Brendan Smyth ===
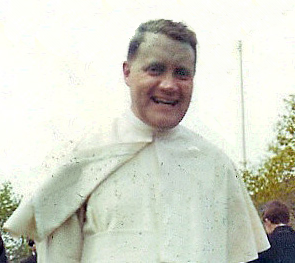
Fr. Brendan Smyth, c. 1965

Brendan Smyth (1927–1997) was a notorious child molester who used his position as a Catholic priest to obtain access to his victims. During a period of over 40 years, Smyth raped or indecently assaulted over one hundred children in parishes in Belfast, Dublin and the United States.

=== Ivan Payne ===
Fr. Ivan Payne (born August 1943) is a former Irish priest of the diocese of Dublin and a convicted child molester. Payne was convicted at Dublin Circuit Criminal Court on 26 January 1998 of 14 sample charges of sexually abusing 8 boys aged between 11 and 14 years old between 1968 and 1987. The abuse took place while the victims were patients in Our Lady's Hospital for Sick Children, Crumlin in 1991 while Payne was hospital chaplain. He also abused altar boys in Cabra. He served 4½ years in jail and was released in October 2002. The archdiocese provides Payne with accommodation and an income equivalent to that of a retired priest. He remains a priest but is not allowed to say Mass or administer sacraments.

=== Tony Walsh ===
In December 2010, "singing priest" Tony Walsh was sentenced to 123 years in prison for 14 child abuse convictions involving sex-related offences dating from the mid-1970s to the mid-1980s. However, the sentences were to be served concurrently, netting to a maximum of 16 years. By the time he pled guilty in December 2018 to indecently assaulting a teenage boy with a crucifix on a date in 1983, Walsh had already been in prison for 13 years.

== Inquiries ==
=== Inquiries into claims that Dublin archdiocese covered up abuse ===
On 18 September 2006 an article in the Irish Independent stated that a four-year Garda (police) inquiry into allegations that the Catholic Church covered up child sex abuse in the Dublin Archdiocese had failed to produce sufficient evidence to lay charges against any senior church figures. In the interim the government established the "Commission of Investigation, Dublin Archdiocese" under Judge Murphy in March 2006 to report on its findings.

On 15 October 2009 the High Court ruled that the commission's report could be published, except for Chapter 19, which contained material relating to three upcoming criminal cases.

On 19 November 2009 the High Court authorised the release of an edited version of the report, with references to three people removed. The slimmed-down report was released online on 26 November. The report strongly criticises the "inappropriate" relationship between some senior Gardaí and priests and bishops and says senior members of the force regarded priests as being outside their investigative remit.

By the end of December 2009 four former or current auxiliary bishops of Dublin had offered to resign. Two of these offers were accepted; the other two were refused by Pope Benedict XVI in August 2010.

=== Commission to Inquire into Child Abuse ===
The Commission to Inquire into Child Abuse (CICA) report was published in May 2009, and reported on the extent and effects of abuse on children in institutions from 1936 onwards. The commission's report said testimony had demonstrated beyond a doubt that the entire system treated children more like prison inmates and slaves than people with legal rights and human potential, that church officials encouraged ritual beatings and consistently shielded their orders' paedophiles from arrest amid a "culture of self-serving secrecy", and that government inspectors failed to stop the chronic beatings, rapes and humiliation. Some of the schools were in the Dublin archdiocese, such as Artane Industrial school. Though run by religious orders, and not by the archdiocese itself, it was found that the archdiocesan authorities including Archbishop McQuaid had commissioned private reports on some of the schools, and knew how they were being run.

== See also ==
Sexual abuse cases in Catholic church

- Catholic Church sexual abuse cases
- Catholic Church sexual abuse cases by country
- Catholic Church sex abuse cases in English Benedictine Congregation
- Catholic Church sexual abuse cases in Ireland
- William Kamm, leader of schismatic catholic group convicted for sexual abuse

Critique & consequences related topics

- Criticism of Pope John Paul II
- Debate on the causes of clerical child abuse
- Ecclesiastical response to Catholic sexual abuse cases
- Instruction Concerning the Criteria for the Discernment of Vocations with Regard to Persons with Homosexual Tendencies in View of Their Admission to the Seminary and to Holy Orders
- Media coverage of Catholic sexual abuse cases
- Settlements and bankruptcies in Catholic sex abuse cases
- Sex Crimes and the Vatican, BBC documentary

Investigation, prevention and victim support related topics

- National Society for the Prevention of Cruelty to Children, UK
- Pontifical Commission for the Protection of Minors
- Sexual Addiction & Compulsivity, peer-reviewed journal on prevention & treatment
- Vos estis lux mundi, church procedure for abuse cases

Other related topics

- Child sexual abuse
- Clerical celibacy
- Pontifical secret
- Religious abuse
