= Éamonn Walsh (bishop) =

Irish former Roman Catholic prelate (born 1944)

The Most Reverend, Dr. Éamonn Walsh BA STL BL DD
- Auxiliary Bishop Emeritus of Dublin; Titular Bishop of Elmham
- Church: Roman Catholic
- Diocese: Dublin
- See: Elmham
- Appointed: 7 March 1990
- Installed: 22 April 1990
- Term ended: 30 September 2019 (Dublin)
- Predecessor: Patrick Leo McCartie (Elmham)
- Previous posts: Apostolic administrator of Ferns; Chairman of the Commission for Pastoral Care of the Irish Catholic Bishops' Conference; President of Cura; Dean at Holy Cross College

Orders
- Ordination: 13 April 1969
- Consecration: 22 April 1990 by Desmond Connell

Personal details
- Born: 1 September 1944 (age 81) Celbridge, County Kildare, Ireland

Styles of Éamonn Walsh
- Reference style: The Most Reverend
- Spoken style: Your Grace
- Religious style: Bishop

Éamonn Oliver Walsh (born 1 September 1944) is an Irish former Roman Catholic prelate who served as auxiliary bishop of Dublin between 1990 and 2019.

== Early life and education ==
Walsh was born in Celbridge, County Kildare on 1 September 1944.

He studied for the priesthood at Holy Cross College, where he completed a Bachelor of Arts in philosophy, and at the Pontifical Lateran University, where he completed a licentiate in sacred theology. Walsh subsequently completed a Bachelor of Laws and a Doctorate in Divinity, and qualified as a barrister.

He was ordained a priest for the Archdiocese of Dublin on 13 April 1969.

== Presbyteral ministry ==
Following ordination, Walsh served as dean of Holy Cross College between 1977 and 1985, and subsequently as junior secretary to Kevin McNamara during his archiepiscopacy. He also served as vicar for clergy, chairman of the clerical fund society and chaplain at Arbour Hill and Mountjoy prisons.

Walsh was appointed secretary to Auxiliary Bishop of Dublin, Joseph Carroll, who was then-archdiocesan administrator, 1987, before his appointment as senior secretary to Desmond Connell upon his elevation to the archiepiscopate the following year.

== Episcopal ministry ==
=== Auxiliary Bishop of Dublin ===
Walsh was appointed auxiliary bishop-elect of Dublin and titular bishop-elect of Elmham, with responsibility for the deaneries of Tallaght, South Dublin and Blessington, by Pope John Paul II on 7 March 1990.

He was consecrated by the Archbishop of Dublin, Desmond Connell, on 22 April in St Andrew's Church, Westland Row, Dublin.

During his episcopate, Walsh chaired the Commission for Pastoral Care of the Irish Catholic Bishops' Conference and served as President of Cura, the crisis pregnancy agency of the Conference. He also served as a member of its Communications Council, and founded the Irish Bishops' Drugs Initiative and the conference's first office for child protection.

==== Clerical sexual abuse scandals ====
As an auxiliary bishop and a junior secretary to Kevin McNamara during his archiepiscopate, Walsh was interviewed for the Murphy Report, the final report of a three-year commission of investigation conducted by the Government of Ireland into sexual abuse cases in the Archdiocese of Dublin, which was published on 26 November 2009.

Speaking with The Irish Times following the winter meeting of the Irish Catholic Bishops' Conference on 9 December, Walsh was asked about one particular allegation, in which he advised a woman to write to the archdiocesan chancellor regarding "a priest who had offended". When asked if he had reported the allegation to the Gardaí, Walsh replied that while the chancellor had acted upon the allegation, "it took about six months for the woman to actually get the name of the complainant", and that he felt that Gardaí could not be contacted about the concerns of a third party. He added that "the spin that was put on that yesterday morning [in an article in The Irish Times the previous day by Colm O’Gorman] was most disingenuous and outrageous".

In the same interview, Walsh defended his record on child protection, saying:

"My record on child protection goes back a long way and it'll continue. And if on the other hand the perception continued among the people that I was somebody who was complicit in all of this, then that would be a barrier in my ministry and I couldn't even minister as a priest or a bishop if that were to continue."

During Midnight Mass in St Mary's Pro-Cathedral on 24 December, Walsh and fellow auxiliary bishop Raymond Field offered their apologies to victims of clerical sexual abuse and announced that they had tendered their resignations as auxiliary bishops of Dublin to Pope Benedict XVI. In a joint statement, Walsh and Field expressed their hope that their resignations "may help to bring the peace and reconciliation of Jesus Christ to the victims (and) survivors of child sexual abuse". This followed the resignations of two former auxiliary bishops of Dublin, James Moriarty and Donal Murray, from their roles as Bishops of Kildare and Leighlin and Limerick respectively.

The Archbishop of Dublin, Diarmuid Martin, had initially called for Walsh and Field to resign, but both initially refused. In his homily at Midnight Mass, Martin remarked that the Church had placed its self-interest above the rights of its parishioners, particularly innocent children, for too long, adding that they, as well as the dedicated majority of priests, had been betrayed by their leaders.

==== Return to ministry ====
It was announced on 11 August 2010 that Walsh's letter of resignation had not been accepted by Pope Benedict XVI, as he felt that Walsh had no case to answer. It was subsequently announced that he would remain as an auxiliary bishop with "revised responsibilities within the diocese".

Walsh was appointed head of the newly established archdiocesan Office for Clergy on 11 September 2013.

=== Apostolic Administrator of Ferns ===
Following the resignation of Brendan Comiskey as Bishop of Ferns, Walsh was appointed apostolic administrator of Ferns by Pope John Paul II on 6 April 2002. He was noted for imagining and implementing a safeguarding infrastructure that would become the blueprint of how child abuse and failings in management would be addressed, with his approach described as "pioneering".

Walsh served in this role until the consecration of Denis Brennan as Bishop of Ferns on 23 April 2006.

== Retirement ==
In accordance with canon law, Walsh submitted his episcopal resignation to the Dicastery for Bishops on his 75th birthday on 1 September 2019.

It was subsequently announced on 30 September that his resignation had been accepted.

== See also ==
- Murphy Report
- Ryan Report
