= Raymond Field (bishop) =

Irish former Roman Catholic prelate (born 1944)

The Most Reverend, Dr. Raymond Field BL DD KC*HS
- Auxiliary Bishop Emeritus of Dublin; Titular Bishop of Árd Mór
- Church: Roman Catholic
- Diocese: Dublin
- See: Árd Mór
- Appointed: 28 May 1997
- Installed: 21 September 1997
- Term ended: 27 June 2019 (Dublin)
- Predecessor: James Holmes-Siedle (Árd Mór); Donal Murray (Dublin)
- Previous posts: Chairman of the Council for Justice and Peace and Council for Immigrants of the Irish Catholic Bishops' Conference; Head chaplain to the Defence Forces; Chaplain at Mountjoy Prison and St Patrick's Institution; Assistant diocesan director at Accord; Teacher at Plunket College of Further Education

Orders
- Ordination: 17 May 1970
- Consecration: 21 September 1997 by Desmond Connell

Personal details
- Born: 24 May 1944 (age 82) Drumcondra, Dublin, Ireland
- Education: Holy Cross College

Styles of Raymond Field
- Reference style: The Most Reverend
- Spoken style: Your Grace
- Religious style: Bishop

Raymond W. Field KC*HS (born 24 May 1944) is an Irish former Roman Catholic prelate who served as auxiliary bishop of Dublin between 1997 and 2019.

== Early life and education ==
Field was born in Drumcondra, Dublin on 24 May 1944. He attended primary and secondary school at O'Connell School before studying for the priesthood at Holy Cross College.

Field was ordained to the priesthood for the Archdiocese of Dublin on 17 May 1970.

== Presbyteral ministry ==
Following ordination, Field completed a Bachelor of Laws from King's Inns and subsequently qualified as a barrister, where he was called to both the British and Irish bars. He was also a member of the first successful Irish expedition to Mount Everest with Dawson Stelfox in 1993.

Field also served as a teacher at Plunket College of Further Education and as chaplain at Mountjoy Prison and St Patrick's Institution. He was also appointed head chaplain to the Defence Forces, and was assistant diocesan director of the Catholic Marriage Advisory Council (now Accord) for thirteen years.

Field has also completed a Doctorate in Divinity and was also appointed Chaplain of His Holiness.

== Episcopal ministry ==
Field was appointed auxiliary bishop-elect of Dublin and titular bishop-elect of Árd Mór, with responsibility for the deaneries of Blanchardstown, Fingal North and Maynooth, by Pope John Paul II on 28 May 1997. He was consecrated by the Archbishop of Dublin, Desmond Connell, on 21 September in St Andrew's Church, Westland Row, Dublin.

Following his appointment as archdiocesan health care representative, Field co-ordinated local preparations for World Day of the Sick celebrations since 2002, while on a national level, he chaired the Council for Justice and Peace and the Council for Immigrants of the Irish Catholic Bishops' Conference.

=== Clerical sexual abuse scandals ===
Following the publication of the Murphy Report, the final report of a three-year commission of investigation conducted by the Government of Ireland into sexual abuse cases in the Archdiocese of Dublin, on 26 November 2009, there were calls for Field to resign from his post.

During Midnight Mass in St Mary's Pro-Cathedral on 24 December, Field and fellow auxiliary bishop Éamonn Walsh offered their apologies to victims of clerical sexual abuse and announced that they had tendered their resignations as auxiliary bishops of Dublin to Pope Benedict XVI. In a joint statement, Field and Walsh expressed their hope that their resignations "may help to bring the peace and reconciliation of Jesus Christ to the victims (and) survivors of child sexual abuse". This followed the resignations of two former auxiliary bishops of Dublin, James Moriarty and Donal Murray, from their roles as Bishops of Kildare and Leighlin and Limerick respectively.

The Archbishop of Dublin, Diarmuid Martin, had initially called for Field and Walsh to resign, but both initially refused. In his homily at Midnight Mass, Martin remarked that the Church had placed its self-interest above the rights of its parishioners, particularly innocent children, for too long, adding that they, as well as the dedicated majority of priests, had been betrayed by their leaders.

=== Return to ministry ===
It was announced on 11 August 2010 that Field's letter of resignation had not been accepted by Pope Benedict XVI.

It was subsequently announced that he would remain as an auxiliary bishop with "revised responsibilities within the diocese".

== Retirement ==
In accordance with canon law, Field submitted his episcopal resignation to the Dicastery for Bishops on his 75th birthday on 24 May 2019.

It was subsequently announced on 27 June that his resignation has been accepted by Pope Francis.

== See also ==
- Ryan Report
