= Apostolic visitation to Ireland =

The apostolic visitation to Ireland was announced on 20 March 2010 in the pastoral letter written by Pope Benedict XVI to Irish Catholics after the publication of the Ryan and Murphy Reports on Catholic Church sexual abuse of children in Ireland in 2009. The visitation to the dioceses was carried out in the four metropolitan sees (or archdioceses) during the first few months of 2011. In addition, Timothy Cardinal Dolan of New York was appointed to conduct visits to four seminaries to review their formation programs. Members of religious institutes were appointed to visit various congregations. The visitation was essentially pastoral.

== Background ==
The Murphy Report, issued in 2009, documented widespread child abuse by priests in the Dublin archdiocese between 1975 and 2004 and said that the church in Ireland had concealed the abuse. The report said one priest admitted abusing children every two weeks for more than 25 years.

On 19 March 2010, following a meeting with the Bishops of Ireland, Pope Benedict XVI issued a pastoral letter to the Catholics in Ireland. The letter expressed sorrow and regret regarding abuse perpetrated by priests and religious and the way in which such cases had been responded to in the past, and called for an Apostolic Visitation of certain dioceses in Ireland, as well as seminaries and religious congregations.

A number of Vatican departments including the Secretariat of State, the Congregation for the Clergy, the Congregation for Catholic Education, the Congregation for Institutes of Consecrated Life and Societies of Apostolic Life as well as the Congregation for the Doctrine of the Faith were involved in the planning of the visitation which will be co-ordinated by the Congregation for Bishops. In a three-way process, the Curia met separately with the visitors and the Irish bishops, while the visitors may well take the opportunity to meet with the bishops to whose diocese they have been assigned. "It is important to remember that the Visitators are not expected to receive allegations of new or old cases of abuse. If any were to arise, such allegations must be reported to the respective Ordinaries or Major Superiors who have the duty to inform the competent civil and ecclesiastical authorities, in conformity with the current civil and ecclesiastical laws.

Reporter Paddy Agnew likened the visitation "To a certain extent, ... equivalent to HQ at a multi-national sending a taskforce delegation of trouble shooters to check out what went wrong at the local branch.

== November 2010 press release ==
On 12 November 2010, the Press Office of the Holy See announced that

The Visitation will identify whether the mutual relationship of the various components of the local Church, seminaries and religious communities is now in place, in order to sustain them on the path of profound spiritual renewal already being pursued by the Church in Ireland. It also has the goal of verifying the effectiveness of the present processes used in responding to cases of abuse and of the current forms of assistance provided to the victims. It will not be an investigation into individual cases of abuse nor a trial to judge past events. The Visitators will have to identify the explicit problems which may require some assistance from the Holy See.

Importantly the press release noted that "The Visitation will in no way interfere with the ordinary activity of local magistrates, nor with the activity of the Commissions of Investigation established by the Irish Parliament nor with the work of any legislative authority, which has competence in the area of prevention of abuse of minors. The Visitation does not seek to replace the legitimate authority of the local Bishops or Religious Superiors, who maintain responsibility in the handling of cases of abuse". This was seen to be in response to some complaints that canon law was seen to override civil law, which some argued led to greater cover up and further abuse. The release made clear that the visitors would "monitor how well the guidelines of "Safeguarding Children, Standards and Guidance Document for the Catholic Church in Ireland", commissioned and produced in February 2009 by the National Board for Safeguarding Children in the Catholic Church, are functioning and how they may be better implemented and improved."

On 7 October 2010, Cardinal Marc Ouellet and Archbishop Manuel Monteiro de Castro, with representatives of the Holy See, held a preparatory meeting with the apostolic visitators named by Pope Benedict. At the meeting were Archbishop Michael Neary of Tuam, along with Cardinal Seán Brady, Archbishops Diarmuid Martin of Dublin and Dermot Clifford of Cashel and Emly for high-level talks with heads of Vatican congregations about the visitation, and met the investigators appointed by Pope Benedict to examine the four Irish archdioceses and "some other as yet unspecified dioceses".

== Scope ==
It was believed that Vatican personnel wanted a broader investigation and not just a look at child abuse. The Congregations for Bishops, for Institutes of Consecrated Life and for Catholic Education concurred with the Secretariat of State that the first phase of the visitation – the inquiry concerning the four metropolitan archdioceses, religious houses and seminaries – should be completed by Easter 2011.

== Visitors ==
The Visitation to the Dioceses was carried out in the four metropolitan sees during the first few months of 2011. Cormac Murphy-O'Connor, the Cardinal-Archbishop Emeritus of Westminster, was to inspect Brady's archdiocese of Armagh, and Sean O'Malley, Cardinal Archbishop of Boston, the Dublin archdiocese. Toronto's Archbishop Thomas Christopher Collins investigated Cashel, while Ottawa's Archbishop Terrence Prendergast looked at the west of Ireland archdiocese of Tuam. Each of the archdioceses is a metropolitan see. The authority of a Latin Church metropolitan over the other sees within his province is, however, somewhat limited. A metropolitan generally presides at the installation and consecration of new bishops in the province, and the tribunal of the metropolitan see generally serves as the first court of appeal regarding canonical matters of provincial diocesan tribunals. The visitators were to give particular attention to victims of abuse and their families, but also to meet with and listen to a variety of people, including ecclesiastical authorities, lay faithful and those involved with the crucial work of safeguarding of children. Brady said he hoped that people would see in time that the apostolic visitation was a genuine attempt to renew the trust of people who had been abused.

An investigation of the state of Irish seminaries was conducted by Archbishop Timothy Dolan of New York. The investigators, known as apostolic visitors, were to report their findings directly to Pope Benedict XVI.

=== Seminaries and religious houses ===
The apostolic visitator for the Irish seminaries was Timothy M. Dolan, Archbishop of New York. The visitator examined all aspects of priestly formation. Dolan visited four institutions: St Patrick's College, Maynooth; the Pontifical Irish College, Rome; Saint Malachy's College, Belfast; and Milltown Institute of Theology and Philosophy, Dublin, which is more an academic centre than a seminary, was examined only with regard to the theological formation offered to future priests. will be visited only in regard to its academic programmes. (All Hallows College, Dublin no longer offers a programme of priestly formation.)

Dolan was assisted by some clerics, approved by the Congregation for Catholic Education, whose main duty was to help to conduct private one-to-one interviews with the seminarians, and staff members. Each priest graduated from the seminary in the previous three years was also given the opportunity for a private interview.

Sharon Holland, Robert Maloney, Máirin McDonagh, and Gero McLoughlin were appointed to serve as apostolic visitators of those institutes of consecrated life and societies of apostolic life with houses in Ireland. The first phase of this visitation consisted of in a questionnaire soliciting information regarding the involvement of Institutes in cases of abuse, the responses offered to victims, and the compliance of the institute with the protocols contained in "Safeguarding Children, Standards and Guidance Document for the Catholic Church in Ireland". The questionnaire also sought to ascertain how each community is dealing with the revelations and their consequences. The visitators then had the opportunity to conduct extended visits to 31 religious institutes.

== 2011 documentary film ==
In 1996 the Irish bishops had devised a new set of policies for handling such allegations, including a mandate to inform law-enforcement officials of all credible reports of abuse. However, in January 1997 Apostolic Nuncio to Ireland Luciano Storero sent a letter to the Irish bishops, conveying the decision of the Congregation for Clergy that the policies should not be carried out. Sterero stated that procedures and policies contrary to canon law "could invalidate the acts of the same Bishops who are attempting to put a stop to these problems." Storero indicated that priests might successfully appeal to the Congregation for the Clergy against disciplinary action taken in line with the policies. The papal nuncio said that since the policies in the English speaking world appear similar in a number of respects, Congregation was conducting a "global study" would "at the appropriate time" provide more complete directions on handling sex-abuse complaints. On 17 January 2011, an Irish television documentary said that in 1997, Cardinal Darío Castrillón Hoyos, then Prefect of the Congregation for the Clergy, directed the Irish bishops not to enforce their new policy calling for mandatory reporting of priests who molested children, as likely to lead to successful appeals by priests disciplined without due canonical process.

The documentary also offers strong support for an Irish prelate who has been the target of savage criticism, and who attempted to resign in protest at the Vatican's policies, and puts a new perspective on the efforts of the Irish hierarchy in general.

"In view of the shortage of personnel trained in canon law, the Visitators insisted on the need for a reorganization of Ireland's ecclesiastical tribunals, to be carried out in cooperation with the competent bodies of the Holy See, so that the various cases still awaiting definitive resolution can be adequately processed."

=== June 2011 communique ===
On 6 June 2011 the Press Office of the Holy See released a communique restating the aims of the visitation examining "whether the mutual relationship of the various components of the local Church, seminaries and religious communities is now in place, in order to sustain them on the path of profound spiritual renewal already being pursued by the Church in Ireland"; "the effectiveness of the present processes used in responding to cases of abuse" and "the current forms of assistance provided to the victims".

It further stated that the reports of the visitors had been presented to the competent departments of the Roman Curia. It noted that, "as far as the Irish dioceses and seminaries are concerned, the Congregation for Bishops and the Congregation for Catholic Education do not envisage further Apostolic Visitations". The Congregation for Institutes of Consecrated Life and Societies of Apostolic Life had analysed the responses to the questionnaires that were sent to all institutes with houses in Ireland. In line with the method previously adopted, visits in loco to some religious communities were to follow. Indications to the bishops and religious houses for the spiritual renewal were to follow shortly. Finally, the communique stated that the final report would be published in early 2012.

== Conclusion ==
On 20 March 2012, the Press Office of the Holy See released a summary of the report, and at the same time a press conference was held in Maynooth, with participation by Nuncio Charles John Brown, Archbishop Diarmuid Martin and Brady.

The Visitators have been able to establish that, over and above the suffering of the victims, the painful events of recent years have also opened many wounds within the Irish Catholic community. Many lay persons have experienced a loss of trust in their Pastors. Many good priests and Religious have felt unjustly tainted by association with the accused in the court of public opinion; some have not felt sufficiently defended by their Bishops and Superiors. Those same Bishops and Superiors have often felt isolated as they sought to confront the waves of indignation and at times they have found it difficult to agree on a common line of action.

The summary of the report stated "...it must be acknowledged that within the Christian community innocent young people were abused by clerics and Religious to whose care they had been entrusted, while those who should have exercised vigilance often failed to do so effectively." It encouraged bishops to continue to meet with and support victims of abuse in an effort "to understand better various aspects of the problem of the sexual abuse of minors" and prevent future occurrence. While acknowledging that "the current norms of Safeguarding Children: Standards and Guidance Document for the Catholic Church in Ireland (Guidelines) are being followed", it recommended regular audits to ensure continued compliance. Furthermore, the norms should be upgraded and revised as needed.

With regard to seminary formation programs, the visitators recommended more consistent admission criteria and to include in the academic programme in-depth formation on matters of child protection, with increased pastoral attention to victims of sexual abuse and their families. Regarding religious institutes, the Holy See directed "All Institutes should perform an audit of their personnel files, if such an audit has not yet been carried out." It further directed bishops and superiors to formulating guidelines for: handling the varied cases of those who have been accused, but in whose case the Director of Public Prosecution has decided not to proceed; policies regarding the falsely accused and their return to ministry; and policies regarding those who are convicted of abuse: the appropriate settings and the conditions under which such offenders should live.

== Response ==
Dolan's review of the Irish Pontifical College in Rome stated "The trustees of the college – the four archbishops of Ireland, the actual owners – seem disengaged from college governance, with meetings, minutes, agenda, and direct supervision irregular." In the wake of the apostolic visitation three of the four senior staff members at the Pontifical Irish College in Rome resigned to resume teaching or pastoral duties. Archbishop Diarmuid Martin of Dublin pointed out that the spiritual director had already asked to be relieved for health reasons, while the vice rector was serving beyond his term of office.

== See also ==
- Catholic Church sexual abuse cases
