= Kevin McNamara =

Kevin McNamara may refer to:

- Kevin McNamara (bishop) (1926–1987), anti-abortion campaigner, Archbishop of Dublin and Primate of Ireland in the 1980s
- Kevin McNamara (politician) (1934–2017), British Labour Party politician, Member of Parliament
