= Éamonn Walsh =

Éamonn Walsh may refer to:

- Éamonn Walsh (bishop) (born 1944), Irish former Roman Catholic prelate
- Éamonn Walsh (politician) (1945–2025), Irish Labour Party politician
