= Ivan Payne =

Irish former priest and convicted child molester (born 1943)

Ivan Payne (born August 1943) was an Irish Roman Catholic priest and is a convicted child molester.

== Career ==
He was ordained a priest in 1967 and was attached to the Archdiocese of Dublin. His first appointment was as chaplain in a convent in Killiney, County Dublin from February 1968 to September 1978. He was subsequently appointed chaplain at Our Lady's Children's Hospital, Crumlin between February 1968 and October 1970. He subsequently studied full-time at University College Dublin. He studied canon law between 1974 and 1976. Payne was appointed Vice Officialis of the Dublin Regional Marriage Tribunal in 1985 by Archbishop Kevin McNamara, which dealt with married Catholics seeking marriage annulments from its inception in 1976 and held this position until 1995. He was appointed to Cabra parish where he remained until 1981. From 1982 until 1995 he served in Sutton parish. He was removed from the ministry in 1995 following an allegation of sex abuse with a minor. In February 2009 he was living in Aberdare in South Wales.

== Sex abuses ==
Payne was convicted at Dublin Circuit Criminal Court on 26 January 1998 of 14 sample charges of sexually abusing eight boys aged between 11 and 14 years old between 1968 and 1987. The abuse took place while the victims were patients in Our Lady's Hospital for Sick Children, Crumlin in 1991 while Payne was hospital chaplain. He was originally sentenced to six years with four years suspended, but the Director of Public Prosecutions appealed the sentence on grounds of leniency.

He also abused altar boys in Cabra. He served 4½ years in jail and was released in October 2002. The Archdiocese provides Payne with accommodation and an income equivalent to that of a retired priest. He remains a priest but is not allowed to say Mass or administer sacraments.

== Archdiocese loan ==
Desmond Connell, Cardinal Archbishop of Dublin provided Payne with a loan of £30,000 in 1993 to satisfy an out-of-court settlement with an abused victim.

In May 1995, Connell told RTÉ that he had paid no money in compensation to any victim of clerical child sexual abuse. He threatened to sue RTÉ "to say that we paid compensation is completely untrue". He never did sue.

== Commission of Inquiry into child sexual abuse in the Dublin Archdiocese ==
The Irish Government established this Inquiry on 28 March 2006 to deal with episodes of child sexual abuse between 1975 and 2004. The public was invited to make submissions to the Inquiry on 25 May 2006 and it is speculated that the extent of abuse in Dublin is likely to be significantly greater or even less than that exposed in The Ferns Report.

== See also ==
- Roman Catholic Church sex abuse scandal
- Roman Catholic priests accused of sex offences
- Crimen sollicitationis
- Pontifical Secret
