= Cloyne (disambiguation) =

Cloyne is a village in County Cork, Ireland. It may also refer to:

- Cloyne, Ontario, Canada, a community in the township of Addington Highlands
- Cloyne Court Hotel, a student housing cooperative in Berkeley, California, USA.
- Cloyne GAA, a Gaelic Athletic Association club in County Cork, Ireland
- Roman Catholic Diocese of Cloyne, Ireland
- Sexual abuse scandal in Cloyne diocese, Ireland, and the resulting 2011 Cloyne Report
- The mythological name for an evil clown in the 2014 horror film Clown (film)
