= Murphy Report =

Irish government report on sexual abuse in the archdiocese of Dublin

The Murphy Report is the brief name of the report of a Commission of investigation conducted by the Irish government into the sexual abuse scandal in the Catholic archdiocese of Dublin. It was released in 2009 by Judge Yvonne Murphy, only a few months after the publication of the report of the Commission to Inquire into Child Abuse (the Ryan Report) chaired by Sean Ryan, a similar inquiry which dealt with abuses in industrial schools controlled by Roman Catholic religious institutes.

== Background ==
In October 2002, the television programme Prime Time broadcast a special report entitled Cardinal Secrets containing accounts of children abused by Catholic priests serving in the Archdiocese of Dublin, where complaints had been made at higher levels and effectively ignored, both by the church and the national police force, the Garda Síochána. This publicity led to the passage of the Commission of Investigation Act 2004 mandating the establishment of a "Commission of Investigation, Dublin Archdiocese" to examine the manner in which allegations of sexual abuse of children by priests over the period 1975 to 2004 were dealt with by Church and state authorities. This act was implemented in March 2006. Judge Yvonne Murphy, a Circuit Court judge, was appointed chair. The original brief was to report in 18 months, but such was the volume of evidence and allegations concerning the abusive behaviour of a sample batch of just 46 priests that time extensions were allowed.

== Emphasis on the avoidance of scandal ==
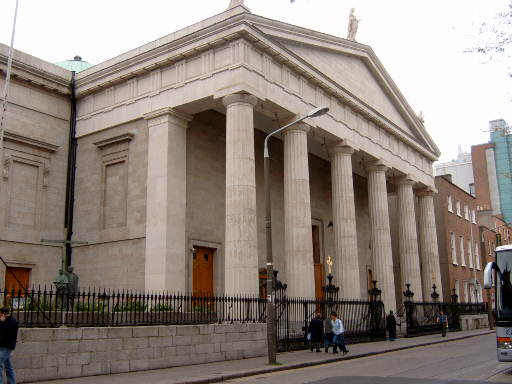
The Marlborough Street facade of the Pro-Cathedral

This report was publicly released on 26 November 2009. It concluded that "the Dublin Archdiocese's preoccupations in dealing with cases of child sexual abuse, at least until the mid-1990s, were the maintenance of secrecy, the avoidance of scandal, the protection of the reputation of the Church, and the preservation of its assets. All other considerations, including the welfare of children and justice for victims, were subordinated to these priorities. The Archdiocese did not implement its own canon law rules and did its best to avoid any application of the law of the State". The 720-page report said that it has "no doubt that clerical child sexual abuse was covered up" from January 1975 to May 2004. As charted by the Murphy commission, the complaints of parents and their children were ignored and other families placed in immediate danger as prelates from John Charles McQuaid onwards suppressed scandals and took refuge in canon law to protect offenders at the expense of children. Complainants alleged that most uninvolved priests turned a blind eye to their allegations.

It was found that some acts of abuse had taken place inside the Pro-Cathedral, which has been the archepiscopal seat of the Archbishop of Dublin since 1825.

The Report states at section 1.32: "Another consequence of the obsessive concern with secrecy and the avoidance of scandal was the failure of successive Archbishops and bishops to report complaints to the Gardaí prior to 1996. The Archbishops, bishops and other officials cannot claim that they did not know that child sexual abuse was a crime. As citizens of the State, they have the same obligations as all other citizens to uphold the law and report serious crimes to the authorities."

== Timeframe ==
In the period from the 1940s to 2004 over 2,800 priests and religious served in the Archdiocese of Dublin. Though the Commission heard about alleged abuse by 67 priests starting from the 1940s, it limited its timeframe from 1975 to 2004. Out of 172 named priests, the Commission decided 102 priests were "within [its] remit". This was further limited to a "sample" of 320 complainants making allegations about 46 priests. Among these 46, eleven either confessed to, or had been convicted of abuse, there was one clear case of false accusation, and two priests had not been accused of abuse but suspicions had been raised.

== Insurance against litigation ==
The commission was told the archdiocese was "on a learning curve" regarding child abuse allegations, but found it had taken out insurance annually from 1987 against the risk of legal costs and damages arising from child sex abuse litigation:

At the time the Archdiocese took out insurance in 1987, Archbishop Kevin McNamara, Archbishop Dermot Ryan and Archbishop John Charles McQuaid had had, between them, available information on complaints against at least 17 priests operating under the aegis of the Dublin Archdiocese. The taking out of insurance was an act proving knowledge of child sexual abuse as a potential major cost to the Archdiocese and is inconsistent with the view that Archdiocesan officials were still "on a learning curve‟ at a much later date, or were lacking in an appreciation of the phenomenon of clerical child sex abuse.

== Status of the Garda investigation ==
Representatives of victims of abuse are quoted as saying that the status of the investigation conducted by Ireland's police service, the Garda Síochána, must be fully scrutinised by the Dublin commission. "It is a huge concern that, given the resources that were provided to the gardaí when the investigation began four years ago, it hasn't produced anything of substance," said Colm O'Gorman, director of the victim-support charity, One in Four.

On 18 September 2006, an article in the Irish Independent stated that a four-year Garda inquiry into allegations that the Catholic Church covered up child sex abuse in the Dublin Archdiocese had failed to produce sufficient evidence to lay charges against any senior Church figures. Journalist Dearbhail McDonald wrote that "Twenty detectives have been assigned to the so-called 'God Squad' since 2002. But despite evidence that priests were transferred to other parishes, where they continued to abuse, and despite public admissions by senior figures that not all relevant information was passed to the civil authorities, no charges will be laid against senior members of the church."

== DPP failure to prosecute cases ==
Many persons had complained about the failure of the Irish Police or the Director of Public Prosecutions to prosecute abuse cases. The Commission noted "the most frequent reason for deciding not to prosecute was the perceived delay in making the complaints... the DPP's approach to the time period that would be regarded as undue delay changed considerably over the period. In the 1980s, a delay of as little as a year might be considered to be a bar to prosecution whereas, in the 2000s, delays of up to 40 years are not considered a bar to prosecutions."

== Release of the report in November 2009 ==
On 15 October 2009, the High Court ruled that the report could be released except for Chapter 19, which contained material relating to three upcoming cases. The earliest of the three cases was expected to be heard in April 2010 and the High Court would reconsider the issue of publishing Chapter 19 in May 2010. The report considers how the Catholic Church handled allegations of sexual abuse against a sample of 46 priests between 1 January 1975 and 30 April 2004.

On 19 November 2009, the High Court authorised the release of an edited version of the report, with references to three people removed.

On 26 November 2009, the report was published. The report consisted of three volumes and cost a total of €3.6 million. The investigating commission identified 320 people who had complained of sexual abuse between 1975 and 2004, and noted 130 complaints had been made since May 2004. It stated that the four archbishops, John Charles McQuaid, Dermot Ryan, Kevin McNamara, and Desmond Connell, who were serving during that time, handled complaints badly. One of the priests who admitted abuse, stated he did so more than 100 times. Another did so fortnightly for 25 years. Another died in 2002, professing he had done nothing wrong. Along with clergy, the Gardaí were accused in the report of covering up the scandal.

== Public reactions ==
Cardinal Connell, the only living archbishop of the four mentioned in the Report, expressed his "bitter regret that failures on my part contributed to the suffering of victims in any form." Connell was partly credited in the Report for initiating two canonical trials in the 1990s, "...in the face of strong opposition from one of the most powerful canonists in the Archdiocese, Monsignor Sheehy," but had released only 17 cases to police out of 28 on the archdiocese's records.

"Because of acts or omissions, individuals who sought assistance did not always receive the level of response or protection which any citizen in trouble is entitled to expect," said Ireland's police commissioner, Fachtna Murphy. Murphy added he was "deeply sorry".

The Irish government said it would make amends to the victims. Dermot Ahern, the justice minister, promised that "the persons who committed these dreadful crimes – no matter when they happened – will continue to be pursued".

Ronan Fanning, a History Professor at University College Dublin, wrote an op-ed on 6 December 2009, titled "The age of our craven deference is finally over", that started: "Historic is a term from which professional historians traditionally recoil and rightly so. The banalities of popular usage have debased its meaning beyond redemption. But there are still rare events that not only deserve but demand to be described as historic. The publication of the Murphy report is one such event: a truly historic landmark in the sad and squalid story of Church-State relations in independent Ireland.

== Bishops' resignations ==
Following publication of the Report, suggestions were made in all Irish newspapers that the former and current Auxiliary bishops of Dublin should be prosecuted or resign; some of their current parishioners felt they should not resign if they had not been prosecuted for any offence. After a gap of several weeks, and with considerable protestations of their innocence, four tendered their resignations in late 2009:

- Donal Murray – 18 December – Bishop of Limerick
- James Moriarty – 23 December – Bishop of Kildare and Leighlin
- Raymond Field – 24 December – titular bishop of Árd Mór
- Eamonn Walsh – 24 December – titular bishop of "Elmhama"

Calls were also made for the resignation of Martin Drennan, Bishop of Galway, and of other and more senior prelates formerly associated with the archdiocese. Bishop Drennan replied that he had handled abuse allegations correctly.

The Church in Ireland is led by 23 bishops. The resigning bishops remained within the hierarchy with the title of "Bishop Emeritus", and remained entitled to pensions. The effect of resignation was to remove them from the duties of pastoral care. Bishop Emeritus is the usual title of all retired bishops and does not denote shame or past misconduct of any sort.

In August 2010 Pope Benedict XVI decided not to accept the resignations of Bishops Field and Walsh.

== International reactions ==
The Report and its outcomes were widely reported in media around the world.

A Vatican spokesman, the Papal Nuncio Giuseppe Leanza, said it was "ashamed" of the Report, and undertook to assist in the forthcoming Report into allegations of child sex abuse by priests in the Diocese of Cloyne.

On 11 December 2009 Pope Benedict XVI said:

The Holy See takes very seriously the central issues raised by the Report, including questions concerning the governance of local Church leaders with ultimate responsibility for the pastoral care of children. The Holy Father (i.e., the Pope) intends to address a Pastoral Letter to the faithful of Ireland in which he will clearly indicate the initiatives that are to be taken in response to the situation. The Holy Father shares the outrage, betrayal and shame felt by so many of the faithful in Ireland, and he is united with them in prayer at this difficult time in the life of the church. The Holy Father was deeply disturbed and distressed by its contents. He wishes once more to express his profound regret at the actions of some members of the clergy who have betrayed their solemn promises to God, as well as the trust placed in them by the victims and their families, and by society at large.

== Publication of Chapter 19 in 2010 ==
The publication of Chapter 19 of the Report was withheld until criminal accusations against Father Tony Walsh had been heard. On 15 December 2010 the chapter was published by court order. Walsh was sentenced to 123 years in prison (in reality, 16 years) for repeated abuses on several boys, mainly in Ballyfermot.

It emerged that Walsh's paedophilic nature was known to his church superiors when he was still a student priest in the 1970s. He was laicised by the Dublin Archdiocese in 1992, a decision Walsh appealed to Rome. The appeal was denied in 1995; the allegations that led to both hearings were not revealed to the Irish police. Walsh was given the pseudonym of 'Father Jovito' in the Murphy Report on its first publication in 2009. As well as the church's evasions over a decade, it emerged that local police also knew of complaints against Father Walsh in 1990–91, but took no action. The Murphy Commission summarised that: "Fr Tony Walsh is probably the most notorious child sexual abuser to have come to the attention of the Commission".

== Liaison with the Vatican ==
In December 2010 the WikiLeaks group publicised thousands of recent United States diplomatic cables. One had been sent by the US Embassy in Rome on 26 February 2010. The author commented that the Murphy Commission had written to the Pope for information in any Vatican files, but the requests had not even been acknowledged.

The Vatican argued that such requests should be made through the Irish government via diplomatic channels, as the Holy See is a sovereign state. It was said in the cable that:

... many in the Vatican were offended by requests for information from the Murphy Commission, which they saw as an affront to Vatican sovereignty. While Vatican contacts immediately expressed deep sympathy for the victims and insisted that the first priority was preventing a recurrence, they also were angered by how the situation played out politically.

Vatican officials were annoyed that the Irish Government "did not step in to direct the Murphy Commission to follow standard procedures in communications with Vatican City".

After several requests, Cardinal Tarcisio Bertone wrote to the Irish embassy in Rome insisting that diplomatic channels be used. Though his government had set up the Murphy Commission to be quasi-independent, Irish Prime Minister Brian Cowen agreed with the Cardinal. There is some significant dispute over the facts of the response of the Vatican.

The Commission argued it had written to Pope Benedict XVI in his capacity as head of the Church, not as head of state of the Vatican City. It said it could not involve the Irish Government, as some past actions and omissions by the government's departments were under investigation.

== See also ==
- Abuse
  - Child sexual abuse
  - Catholic sexual abuse scandal in Ireland
  - Religious abuse
  - Sexual abuse
  - Ferns Report
- Martin Drennan, Bishop of Galway, and former Auxiliary Bishop of Dublin
- Roman Catholicism in Ireland
- Giuseppe Lazzarotto, archbishop, previous Nuncio, criticised by the Murphy Commission for not cooperating fully
- Giuseppe Leanza, archbishop, Apostolic Nuncio to Ireland during publication of the report
- Diarmuid Martin, Primate of Ireland and Archbishop of Dublin
- Mother and Baby Homes Commission of Investigation
- Donal Murray, Bishop Emeritus of Limerick – named in report and resigned as a result
- Thomas Naughton, priest – named in chapter 29
- Ivan Payne, priest – subject of chapter 24
- Eamonn Oliver Walsh, Auxiliary Bishop of Dublin – named in report
