= Thomas Naughton =

Thomas Naughton is a priest of the Archdiocese of Dublin, who was found guilty of the indecent assault of minors. He was one of 46 priests mentioned in the Murphy Report.

== Early career and sex offences ==
Neighton was ordained in 1963 for St. Patrick's Missionary Society, then going to Africa and the West Indies. He also served in Nigeria and Grenada before returning to Ireland in 1976. He was incardinated into the Archdiocese of Dublin in 1981

He served in several parishes in the Archdiocese of Dublin, including Aughrim Street and Valleymount, County Wicklow until, in 1984, an ex-garda complained to the then Auxiliary Bishop of Dublin, Donal Murray, about Naughton.

He was then assigned to Donnycarney, where he was in charge of altar boys, some of whom he sexually abused.

He attended a treatment centre in Stroud, Gloucestershire. Even though his counsellors believed that Naughton had limited insight into his offences, he was assigned to Ringsend, Dublin before being removed from there following further episodes of abuse.

He was convicted of abusing an altar boy in Donnycarney and sentenced to three years in prison, reduced on appeal to six months. He attended a treatment centre at Our Lady of Victory in Stroud, which offers "therapy in a spiritual context", before his conviction.

== Mervyn Rundle's 18-year battle for justice ==
In November 1985, Mervyn Rundle, then a 10-year-old altar boy in Donnycarney, Dublin, came to Naughton's house. Upon returning home, he told his mother that the priest was "a queer". The boy offered his dishevelled clothes as proof, saying Naughton had touched him sexually. Mrs Rundle telephoned her husband and told him to come home from work immediately. Later, Mr Rundle, then an active parishioner, took his young son by the hand and went to the Archbishop's House to report the abuse to Monsignor Alex Stenson. Naughton was charged with indecently assaulting four altar boys between 1984 and 1988. He pleaded guilty and served the above-mentioned jail sentence.

== Archdiocese response ==
Mervyn recalled the details of that Wednesday afternoon when Stenson asked his father to step outside while he was left alone with a senior cleric. Msgr Stenson denied an allegation that he had accused the boy of lying, and the Murphy Report makes no mention of such an incident.. Afterwards, the boy's father received a letter from the church explaining that Naughton's behaviour was caused by malaria and a fight he had with his mother. Naughton, when challenged by the Archdiocese about the abuse, admitted what he had done.

When further offences came to light in 1988, Naughton was returned to the clinic. From 1988 until his conviction a decade later, he lived in the headquarters of the St Patrick's order, caring for elderly members of the order.

In 1995, Mervyn Rundle found out that Naughton had abused at least two other boys in Ringsend and was still saying Mass. He then phoned the Archbishop's House. At first he was told that the Archbishop was abroad but half an hour later, he was told he could see him the following day. Archbishop Connell was "apologetic" when Mervyn and his father found themselves back in his house for a second time. Mervyn was told that Naughton was in an enclosed order and that the Archbishop would put a stop to his saying Mass.

The same day, he and his father went to Clontarf Garda Station to file an official complaint. Mervyn's father said that was the first time he heard the full truth of the abuse his son had suffered. The Rundles also initiated a civil action against the Archdiocese, from which he received a settlement of approximately €400,000 in January 2003, 18 years after the offences were committed.

== December 2009 conviction ==
In December 2009 Thomas Naughton pleaded guilty to five sample counts of indecent assault against an altar boy. The abuse began in 1982 and continued for two years, when the victim was an altar boy in Valleymount parish and Thomas Naughton was curate. The judge described the abuse as "appalling, shocking and horrifying" and sentenced Naughton to five concurrent sentences of three years each, with the final year suspended in every case.

== See also ==
- Roman Catholic Church sex abuse scandal
- Roman Catholic priests accused of sex offences
- Ferns Report, on sexual abuse in the Roman Catholic Diocese of Ferns, Ireland
- Crimen sollicitationis
- Pontifical Secret
- Deliver Us from Evil
- Sex Crimes and the Vatican (Panorama Documentary Episode)
- Barbara Blaine founder of SNAP (Survivors Network for those Abused by Priests)
