= Sexual abuse scandal in the Roman Catholic Diocese of Cloyne =

Sexual abuse cases in Ireland

The sexual abuse in the Roman Catholic Diocese of Cloyne in County Cork, Ireland was investigated by the Commission of Investigation, Dublin Archdiocese, Catholic Diocese of Cloyne, examining how allegations of sexual abuse of children in the diocese were dealt with by the church and state. The investigation, which resulted in the publication of the Cloyne Report in July 2011, was led by Judge Yvonne Murphy. The inquiry was ordered to look at child protection practices in the diocese and how it dealt with complaints against 19 priests made from 1996.

== Misrepresentation by Bishop Magee ==
In February 2008, the Irish Government referred two allegations of child sex abuse to the National Board for Safeguarding Children, an independent supervisory body established by the Irish bishops, led by Mr Ian Elliott. When the chief executive of that body made contact with the diocese on the matter, he was met with lack of co-operation. Meetings held with Bishop John Magee and representatives of the diocese in March failed to elicit his full co-operation with the National Board for Child Protection's investigation. According to BBC News, "The report found that Bishop John Magee falsely told the government and the health service that his diocese was reporting all abuse allegations to authorities. It also found that the bishop deliberately misled another inquiry and his own advisors by creating two different accounts of a meeting with a priest suspecting of abusing a child, one for the Vatican and the other for diocesan files".

== Media disclosures ==
In April 2008, Justine McCarthy, a journalist with the Sunday Tribune, broke the story of the impending scandal in the diocese of Cloyne. There followed a number of hastily arranged meetings between Magee, Monsignor Denis O'Callaghan, (the Vicar General of Cloyne), and Dean Eamon Gould with representatives of the National Board for Safeguarding Children in the Catholic Church (or Safeguarding for short). These resulted in O'Callaghan handing over documentation concerning the two cases referred by the Irish Government to Safeguarding.

On 28 June 2008, Ian Elliott, the chief executive officer of Safeguarding, completed a damning report on the handling of both cases by Magee, by his delegate for Child Protection, O'Callaghan, and by his inter-diocesan case management committee. The Elliot Report was examined by that case management committee on 9 July 2008, and it adopted a position threatening Elliot and Safeguarding with legal action were they to publish the Report. In the meantime, Elliott passed the report to the Irish Government and to the minister for Children, Barry Andrews who did not read the report but passed it to the Health Service Executive to compile another report on it.

== Political recommendations ==
In December 2008, Deputy Sean Sherlock of the Labour Party raised the matter in the press and demanded a Dáil discussion of the handling of Child Sex Abuse in Cloyne. Further press coverage led to the publication of the Elliott Report by Bishop Magee on 19 December 2008. The contents of the Report were shocking and concluded that Bishop Magee's actions, and those of his agent's in this area, were inadequate and in some respects were dangerous.

There followed a chorus of demands for Bishop Magee's resignation. The demands were renewed in January 2009 with the publication of the HSE Report commissioned by the Minister for Children which uncovered a number of other cases which had not been reported to the authorities or dealt with according to self-regulatory procedures. The Minister rejected a recommendation of the Health Executive Service report that the Cloyne case not be referred to the Dublin Tribunal of Investigation into Child Abuse and, following a Cabinet meeting held on 7 January, he referred Cloyne to the Dublin Tribunal which published a report in November 2009.

== Public consequences ==
It now remains to be seen whether a member of the public will make complaint to the Garda Síochána (Irish police force) against Bishop Magee and/or Monsignor Denis O'Callaghan under the terms of the Criminal Justice Act 2006 which provides for a new offence of reckless endangerment of children. This came into effect on 1 August 2006.

This offence may be committed by a person who has authority or control over a child or an abuser and who intentionally or recklessly endangers a child by:

Causing or permitting any child to be placed or left in a situation which creates a substantial risk to the child of being a victim of serious harm or sexual abuse or failing to take reasonable steps to protect a child from such a risk while knowing that the child is in such a situation. This offence may be prosecuted only by the Director of Public Prosecutions. The penalty is a fine (no upper limit) and/or a maximum of 10 years imprisonment.

== Apologies ==
In January 2009, Magee apologised to victims of clerical sex abuse after a report compiled by the Health Service Executive (HSE) found his diocese had put children at risk of harm through an "inability" to respond appropriately to abuse allegations. In spite of "a large number of calls for his resignation" the Bishop signalled his intention to remain.

Further analysis in January 2009 suggested that the bishop and diocese staff were sparing with details of allegations, and that Bishop Magee might have to resign, but also that the Irish government had not yet legislated for all the improvements in the law of evidence that were called for in the Ferns Report of 2005.

== Intervention by Rome ==
On 7 March 2009 Pope Benedict appointed Archbishop Dermot Clifford of Cashel and Emly as apostolic administrator of the Cloyne diocese, though Bishop Magee remained Bishop in title. Bishop Magee requested that the Pope take this action on 4 February. Bishop Magee said that he would use the time to "devote the necessary time and energy to cooperating fully with the government Commission of Inquiry into child protection practices and procedures in the diocese of Cloyne". In accordance with canon law, an apostolic administrator is named for an open-ended interim period. Bishop Magee's resignation was formally accepted by the Vatican on 24 March 2010.

== Judicial Inquiry report, July 2011 ==
Due to the success of the 2009 Murphy Report, a judicial inquiry into the sexual abuse scandal in the Catholic archdiocese of Dublin, the same team was reappointed to investigate allegations surrounding the diocese of Cloyne. Its remit included investigating the state's health and policing practices as well as the Church itself. Judge Murphy's Inquiry issued its report on 13 July 2011. The findings of fact included that:

- Two-thirds of abuse allegations made in 1996–2009 were not passed on to the Garda, as required by the Church's 1996 guidelines
- In a secret letter the Vatican described the Irish bishops' 1996 guidelines to be a "study document", and not a binding set of rules
- Bishop Magee had misled the former inquiries by the Health Service Executive (HSE) in 2009
- An accusation against Bishop Magee himself was dismissed; another 18 priests were named using pseudonyms

== Taoiseach and other reaction ==
- On 20 July 2011 Taoiseach Enda Kenny criticised the Vatican, deploring "the dysfunction, disconnection and elitism that dominates the culture of the Vatican to this day" The Vatican reacted "to evidence of humiliation and betrayal ... with the gimlet eye of a Canon lawyer[, a] calculated, withering position." He also told the Dáil that "the historic relationship between church and state in Ireland could not be the same again. The rape and torture of children were downplayed or 'managed' to uphold instead the primacy of the institution, its power, standing and reputation."
- In a televised interview, Archbishop Diarmuid Martin deplored a "cabal" in the Church that still refused to recognise Vatican rules on child protection.
- Alan Shatter, the Minister for Justice and Equality, said that ".. it is difficult to read the Cloyne Report and avoid despair. ..The report's findings are unambiguous. It is severely critical of the Diocese of Cloyne. The diocese's response to complaints and allegations of child sexual abuse in the period from 1996 up to 2008 was totally inadequate and inappropriate."
- Head of the Holy See Press Office Federico Lombardi, speaking on a personal basis, said it was ".. somewhat strange to see the Vatican criticised so heavily". Regarding the 1997 letter that suggested that the 1996 bishops' child protection guidelines amounted only to a "study document", he added that "There is no motive to interpret the letter in the way it has been, as an attempt to cover up cases of abuse. There is nothing in the letter which suggests not respecting the laws of the land."
- The Cloyne diocese commented that the 11 priests considered abusive in recent decades worked among 415 priests about whom no complaints were made.
- Statement by the Government of Ireland on the response of the Holy See regarding the report of the Commission of Investigation into the Catholic Diocese of Cloyne 8 September 2011
- Statement by the Taoiseach on the Dáil Motion on the report of the Commission of Investigation into the Catholic Diocese of Cloyne, 20 July 2011
- Shawn Pogatchnik (21 July 2011). "Angry Ireland finally confronts Vatican over abuse". The Guardian. London.

== See also ==
- Catholic Church sexual abuse cases in Ireland
- Abuse
- Child abuse
- Child sexual abuse
- Religious abuse
- Sexual abuse
- Sexual misconduct
- Spiritual abuse
