= Desmond Connell =

Irish cardinal in the Roman Catholic Church

His Eminence Desmond Connell
- Cardinal, Archbishop Emeritus of Dublin
- Archdiocese: Dublin
- Installed: 21 January 1988 (appointed)
- Term ended: 26 April 2004 (retired)
- Predecessor: Kevin McNamara
- Successor: Diarmuid Martin

Orders
- Ordination: 19 May 1951 (Priest)
- Consecration: 6 March 1988 (Archbishop)
- Created cardinal: 21 February 2001
- Rank: Cardinal-Priest of S. Silvestri in Capite

Personal details
- Born: 24 March 1926 Phibsboro, Dublin, Ireland
- Died: 21 February 2017 (aged 90) Dublin, Ireland
- Education: Clonliffe College; University College Dublin; Maynooth College; University of Leuven
- Coat of arms

Desmond Connell KGCHS (24 March 1926 – 21 February 2017) was an Irish cardinal in the Roman Catholic Church. He was an Archbishop of Dublin and Primate of Ireland. Cardinal Connell was one of a number of senior clergy to have been heavily criticised for inaction, making misleading statements and covering up clerical sex abuse in Dublin. He died on 21 February 2017, aged 90.

== Early life ==
Connell was born in Dublin on 24 March 1926, the son of John, a civil servant and Mary Lacy, a telephone operator. He was educated at St Peter's National School, Phibsboro and the Jesuit Fathers' second-level school, Belvedere College, and studied for the priesthood at Holy Cross College, Clonliffe.

He later studied Arts at University College Dublin (UCD) and graduated with a BA in 1946; he was awarded an MA the following year. Between 1947 and 1951, he studied theology at St Patrick's College, Maynooth for a Bachelor of Divinity. He continued his studies at the Pontifical University of Leuven, Belgium, where he was awarded a doctorate in Philosophy in 1953. In 1981 he was awarded a D.Litt. degree by the National University of Ireland.

== Clerical career ==
Connell was ordained priest by Archbishop John Charles McQuaid in 1951 and consecrated by Archbishop Gaetano Alibrandi, Titular Archbishop of Binda in 1988. He also had an academic career, with a post at the Department of Metaphysics in University College Dublin. He was appointed Professor of General Metaphysics in 1972. In 1983, he became the Dean of the Faculty of Philosophy and Sociology.

=== Archbishop of Dublin ===
Archbishop Kevin McNamara died unexpectedly in April 1987 but Connell's appointment was not formally announced until January 1988. The favoured bishop for the post was Bishop Donal Murray. Murray was reportedly blocked by the apostolic nuncio, Archbishop Gaetano Alibrandi, who wanted to transfer Archbishop Dermot Clifford from Cashel to Dublin. However, that was opposed by Dublin priests (and many of the bishops), who saw Clifford as an outsider in Dublin. Concerns were raised that Clifford was not popular with his own priests in Cashel. When it became clear that Bishop Murray was the papal nuncio's chosen candidate, conservative elements in Dublin told their contacts in Rome that the auxiliary bishop accepted "unorthodox practices" in his area of the archdiocese, such as allowing altar girls in Bray, at the time an uncommon practice, and the conduct of absolution services there. A news report on the subject was broadcast on RTÉ. Rome withdrew Murray as a candidate.

In autumn 1987 Connell's name emerged as a contender for Dublin. Connell was 62 and dean of the faculty of philosophy and sociology at UCD but had little pastoral experience. He had been a close friend of both previous archbishops of Dublin, McNamara and Dermot Ryan, and had ministered to the dying Dr McNamara. By December 1987, rumours from Rome indicated that Connell was to get the appointment. On 21 January 1988, it was announced he was archbishop-elect.

Connell was appointed Archbishop of Dublin by the Holy See on 21 January 1988. He was consecrated in St Mary's Pro-Cathedral in Dublin on 6 March 1988. Connell began to speak out on social issues, particularly on unemployment, Travellers, and the disadvantaged generally.

He was created Cardinal-Priest by Pope John Paul II at the Consistory in Rome on 21 February 2001 with the Titulus S. Silvestri in Capite.

On 26 April 2004, Connell retired as archbishop, handing the diocese to the coadjutor, Diarmuid Martin. All bishops submit their resignation to the Pope on their 75th birthday. Connell's was accepted shortly after he turned 78. He attended the 50th International Eucharistic Congress in Dublin in June 2012 and concelebrated at the Statio Orbis Mass in Croke Park Stadium.

=== Pope Benedict XVI ===
Connell was one of the cardinal electors who participated in the 2005 papal conclave that selected Pope Benedict XVI. He had been a supporter of the Holy Office's declaration Dominus Iesus in 2000, applauding its opposition to relativism.

== Handling of sexual abuse cases ==
In 1996, Connell refused to help Marie Collins, a victim of Paul McGennis and did not pass on what he knew to her or to the police. He apologised six years later, in April 2002. In October 2002, a RTÉ Prime Time programme was broadcast detailing cases of sexual abuse among the clergy within the Dublin diocese. Connell's failure to address the abuse adequately would come under intense criticism.

The Irish government launched the Murphy Commission in March 2006 to investigate the matter. The prospect of Connell giving evidence to the Murphy Commission was notable in itself:

"The 79-year-old cardinal will be rigorously questioned on his handling of complaints when he was archbishop of Dublin from 1988 until his retirement last year. Never before has an Irish prince of the Roman Catholic church found himself hauled before a state inquiry into the management of the country's largest diocese".

The 2009 Murphy Report into the scandal found that Connell was "slow to recognize the seriousness of the situation when he took over in 1988. He was over-reliant on advice from other people, including his auxiliary bishops and legal and medical experts. He was clearly personally appalled by the abuse but it took him some time to realize that it could not be dealt with by keeping it secret and protecting priests from the normal civil processes".

However, it commended him for making the archdiocesan records available to the authorities in 2002 and for his 1995 actions in giving the authorities the names of 17 priests who had been accused of abuse, but the list was incomplete, as complaints were made against at least 28 priests in the Archdiocese.

The report also found and disclosed that from 1988 onward, Connell had continued to insure his archdiocese against liability from complainants but had claimed to the Murphy Commission that the archdiocese was "on a learning curve" in regard to child abuse.

He arranged for compensation payments to be made from a "Stewardship Trust", which was kept secret from the archdiocese's parishioners until 2003.

== Mental reservation ==
Connell was criticised in some quarters for being economical with the truth in his use of the concept of mental reservation in inadequately answering questions about his knowledge of the abusive activities of priests under his control. Connell explained the concept of mental reservation to the commission:

"Well, the general teaching about mental reservation is that you are not permitted to tell a lie. On the other hand, you may be put in a position where you have to answer, and there may be circumstances in which you can use an ambiguous expression realising that the person who you are talking to will accept an untrue version of whatever it may be – permitting that to happen, not willing that it happened, that would be lying. It really is a matter of trying to deal with extraordinarily difficult matters that may arise in social relations where people may ask questions that you simply cannot answer. Everybody knows that this kind of thing is liable to happen. So, mental reservation is, in a sense, a way of answering without lying."

== Attitude to the Church of Ireland ==
Connell, in an interview, spoke of what he claimed was a series of snubs from historically-Anglican Trinity College Dublin. Notably, in 1988, he alleged the university had "insulted me and through me the Catholic people of Dublin" by inviting him to the award of a doctorate to the Church of Ireland Archbishop of Dublin, Dr. Walton Empey.

Connell was forced to issue an apology for saying that Dr. Empey did not "have much theological competence", and for describing his Church of Ireland counterpart as not being regarded as a "high flier".

== Published works ==
Connell has had a number of works published on philosophical or pastoral issues. These include:

- Essays in metaphysics, Four Court Press, Blackrock, County Dublin, 1996 ISBN 1-85182-228-3
- Christian integrity: does it matter? : pastoral letter for Lent 1992, Veritas, Dublin, 1992 ISBN 1-85390-205-5
- Christ our life: pastoral letter 1993, Veritas Publications, 1993 ISBN 1-85390-286-1
- Christ our life: pastoral letters, 1988–95, Four Courts Press, Blackrock, County Dublin ISBN 1-85182-207-0

There was also one work published in his honour:

- At the heart of the real: philosophical essays in honour of Dr Desmond Connell, Archbishop of Dublin edited by Fran O'Rourke, Irish Academic Press, Blackrock, County Dublin, 1992 ISBN 0-7165-2464-3 .

== Episcopal motto ==
His episcopal motto, Secundum Verbum Tuum (According to Thy Word), is taken from Mary's response to God's call at the Annunciation, "Be it done unto me according to thy word." (Luke 1:38.)

== See also ==
- Roman Catholic Church sexual abuse scandal in Ireland

Catholic Church titles
Preceded by Basil Hume	Cardinal Priest of S. Silvestro in Capite; 21 February 2001 – 21 February 2017	Succeeded by Louis-Marie Ling Mangkhanekhoun
Preceded by Kevin McNamara	Archbishop of Dublin; 6 March 1988 – 26 April 2004	Succeeded by Diarmuid Martin
