= Tony Walsh (priest) =

Irish priest convicted of sexual abuse

Tony Walsh (born 1954) is a former Irish Roman Catholic priest who was convicted of child sexual abuse. In 2010, Walsh was convicted and had a 16-year sentence imposed on him "for the rape and abuse of three schoolboys."

== Career ==
In the late 1970s, Walsh became part of Father Michael Cleary's All Priests Show as an Elvis impersonator. He was dropped from the show in the 1980s following rumours of child abuse, which were not reported to the Gardaí. He was known as a "singing" priest.

== Convictions ==
In December 2010 he was sentenced to 123 years in prison for rape and sexual abuse committed against three schoolboys. The sentences were to be served concurrently, netting to a maximum of 16 years. At the time it was the most severe sentence imposed on a clerical child sex abuser in Ireland. All of the 14 charges which Walsh was convicted of involved acts of child sex abuse which occurred from the mid-1970s to mid 1980s. In December 2018, Walsh received an additional 3 1/2-year prison sentence, which will also be served concurrently, after he pleaded guilty to indecently assaulting a teenage boy with a crucifix in 1983.

Archbishop Diarmuid Martin apologised to Walsh's victims and admitted that the church had failed them.

=== Murphy Report ===
Chapter 19 of the Murphy Report was released by a High Court ruling on 15 December 2010 following the trial. On 17 December 2010 the Irish Times published the following quote from the report:

"Fr Tony Walsh is probably the most notorious child sexual abuser to have come to the attention of the Commission... His pattern of behaviour is such that it is likely that he has abused hundreds of children." – Introduction to Chapter 19 of the Murphy Report.

== Current status ==
Due for release in 2021 he had his sentence extended by a further two years in July of that year. By the time of his December 2018 guilty plea, Walsh had already been in prison for 13 years. He was sentenced to another four years for similar offences in July 2022.

It was reported in November 2024 that Walsh had been released.

== See also ==
- Timeline of church responses, 1978–1997
