= Paul McGennis =

Paul McGennis, a priest of the Archdiocese of Dublin, pleaded guilty in 1997 to two charges of sexually assaulting a child, Marie Collins, at Our Lady's Children's Hospital, Crumlin, Dublin, when he was chaplain there in 1960. He also pleaded guilty in 1997 to two charges of assaulting a nine-year-old girl in County Wicklow between 1977 and 1979. He continued to serve as a priest until 1997 in Edenmore, Dublin.

There is evidence that John Charles McQuaid, Archbishop of Dublin, was contacted in 1960 by the Gardaí who had discovered pornographic photographs which were being developed in England for McGennis when he was chaplain to Our Lady's Children's Hospital, Crumlin. McQuaid reportedly interviewed McGennis and "arranged for him to have treatment which was considered successful at the time."

Collins reportedly approached Archbishop Desmond Connell in 1995 about the abuse she endured in 1960. Connell told her in 1996 that the archdiocese would not cooperate with the Garda Síochána in the investigation and he refused to confirm the priest's admission to the assaults - despite the Irish bishops' strict guidelines for reporting complaints of clerical child abuse to the civil authorities.

The then Cardinal Connell apologised in 2002 for his reluctance in 1996 to co-operate.

== See also ==
- Catholic Church sexual abuse cases
- Ferns Report, on sexual abuse in the Roman Catholic Diocese of Ferns, Ireland
- Crimen sollicitationis
- Pontifical secret
- Deliver Us from Evil (2006 film)
- "Sex Crimes and the Vatican" (Panorama documentary episode)
- Barbara Blaine, founder of SNAP (Survivors Network for those Abused by Priests)
- "Red Hot Catholic Love", South Park television episode
