= Vincent Mercer =

Vincent Mercer, OP (born 1947 in County Kerry) is a Dominican priest and former headmaster at Newbridge College. He is a convicted sex offender, guilty of dozens of counts of sexual abuse of children. He was also imprisoned from 2013 to 2016 for sexually assaulting a child between 1986 and 1994.

== 2003 case ==
In March 2003, Mercer pleaded guilty at Naas District Court to four counts of indecent assault on a 13-year-old boy. He was given a sentence of six months imprisonment.

== 2005 case ==
He was convicted in March 2005 of 13 sample charges of indecently assaulting eight boys aged 10–13, between 1970 and 1977. He received a three-year suspended sentence at Naas Circuit Criminal Court.

== See also ==
- Catholic sexual abuse scandal in Ireland
- Roman Catholic priests accused of sex offenses
- Crimen sollicitationis
