= Donal Murray (bishop) =

Irish Catholic bishop (1940–2024)

The Most Reverend Donal Murray
- Bishop Emeritus of Limerick
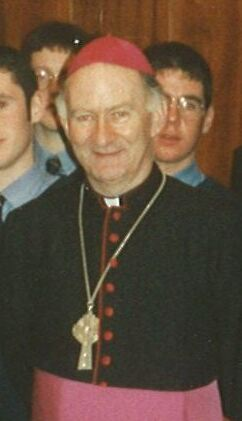
- Murray in 1996
- Archdiocese: Cashel and Emly
- Diocese: Limerick
- Appointed: 10 February 1996
- Installed: 24 March 1996
- Term ended: 17 December 2009
- Predecessor: Jeremiah Newman
- Successor: Brendan Leahy
- Previous posts: Auxiliary Bishop of Dublin and Titular Bishop of Glenndálocha (1982–1996)

Orders
- Ordination: 22 May 1966
- Consecration: 18 April 1982 by Dermot Ryan

Personal details
- Born: Donal Brendan Murray; 29 May 1940 Dublin, Ireland
- Died: 13 October 2024 (aged 84) Limerick, Ireland
- Denomination: Roman Catholic
- Motto: Veritas in Caritate "Truth in Charity"
- Coat of arms

Donal Brendan Murray (29 May 1940 – 13 October 2024) was an Irish Roman Catholic prelate, who served as Bishop of Limerick from 1996 to 2009. He had previously served as an Auxiliary Bishop of the Dublin diocese

== Biography ==
=== Early life and ordination ===
Murray was born in Dublin on 29 May 1940. He was educated at Blackrock College, studied for a BA and master's degrees in philosophy at University College Dublin, obtained a B.Div at St Patrick's College, Maynooth and his Licence and Doctorate in theology in Pontifical University of St. Thomas Aquinas (Angelicum).

It was said of him by one commentator that Murray "was rated by Connell as the brightest student he taught in his 35 years as a professor of metaphysics at University College, Dublin."

He was ordained on 22 May 1966.

=== Priestly ministry ===
Murray lectured in the Mater Dei Institute of Education from 1969, becoming professor of moral theology at Clonliffe College. He also lectured at UCD – from 1973 to 1982 in Catechetics and from 1978 to 1982 in Medical Ethics.

He served as advisor to the Irish representatives at the Synod of Bishops in the Catholic Church in 1977 which dealt with catechetics.

=== Episcopal ministry ===
In November 1981 he was appointed Titular Bishop of Glenndálocha and Auxiliary Bishop of Dublin, making him the youngest bishop at the time, aged only 41. He was ordained Bishop in St Andrew's Church, Westland Row, Dublin.

He chose, as his episcopal motto "Veritas in Caritate" ("The Truth in Love") which ironically, given his later translation to Limerick was also the motto of Henry Murphy (bishop) and of St Munchin's College.

He was appointed bishop of Limerick on 10 February 1996 by Pope John Paul II and installed as Bishop of Limerick on 24 March 1996. He attended the European Synod of Bishops in Rome in Autumn 1999 on behalf of the Irish hierarchy.

In one assessment of his tenure as Bishop of Limerick given at the time of his resignation it was recalled "he proved to be a hard-working bishop setting up parish councils and renovating St John's Cathedral (Limerick). He even sold the traditional bishop's palace, moving into a modest house."

=== Abuse scandal ===
In November 2009, he was pressured to resign from his post after the Murphy Report found that he had mishandled child sexual abuse allegations within his diocese.

He announced his resignation to a congregation, including priests of the Diocese, people working in the Diocesan Office and the Diocesan Pastoral Centre, at 11 am (noon in Rome, the hour of the publication of the decision) in St. John's Cathedral, Limerick.

== Death and tribute ==
Murray died at the Milford Care Centre in Limerick on 13 October 2024, at the age of 84.

His successor as Bishop of Limerick Brendan Leahy noted in a tribute to Bishop Murray "he was attuned to the fast changing ecclesial and social context and the challenge of rebuilding the community of faith. His great mind was always working on building a Church of tomorrow, not on holding into a Church of the past."

== See also ==
- Catholic Church sexual abuse cases in Ireland
- Catholic Church sexual abuse cases by country
- Catholic Church in Ireland

Catholic Church titles
Preceded by Jeremiah Newman	Bishop of Limerick; 1996–2009	Succeeded by Brendan Leahy
Preceded by —	Auxiliary Bishop of Dublin; 1982–1996	Succeeded by —
Preceded by Marian Przykucki	Titular Bishop of Glenndálocha; 1982–1996	Succeeded by Diarmuid Martin
