= Diarmuid Martin =

Former Archbishop of Dublin

The Most Reverend Diarmuid Martin
- Archbishop Emeritus of Dublin; Primate Emeritus of Ireland
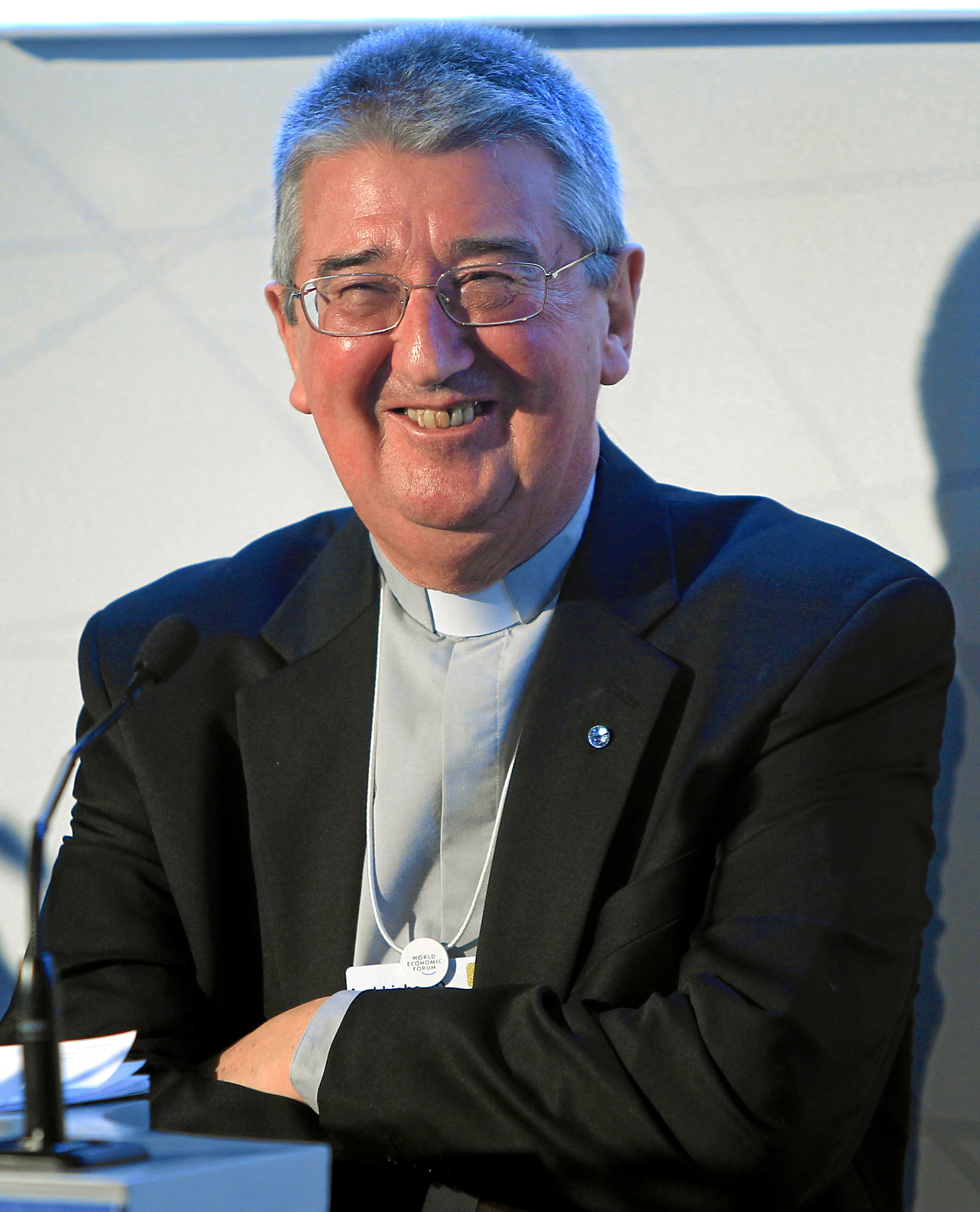
- Martin at the World Economic Forum Annual Meeting in 2013
- Diocese: Dublin
- See: Dublin
- Installed: 26 April 2004
- Term ended: 29 December 2020
- Predecessor: Desmond Connell
- Successor: Dermot Farrell
- Other posts: Coadjutor Archbishop of Dublin (2003–2004); Apostolic Nuncio in Geneva and Titular Archbishop of Glendalough (2001–2003); Titular Bishop of Glendalough (1999–2001)

Orders
- Ordination: 25 May 1969 by John Charles McQuaid
- Consecration: 6 January 1999 by Pope John Paul II

Personal details
- Born: Diarmuid Martin; 8 April 1945 (age 81) Dublin, Ireland
- Education: De La Salle School, Ballyfermot, University College Dublin, Holy Cross College, Clonliffe, Pontifical University of St. Thomas Aquinas Angelicum

Styles of Diarmuid Martin
- Reference style: The Most Reverend
- Spoken style: Your Grace
- Religious style: Archbishop

Diarmuid Martin (born 8 April 1945) is an Irish prelate of the Catholic Church who was Archbishop of Dublin and Primate of Ireland from 2004 to 2020. From 1976 to 2003 he held a variety of positions in the Roman Curia and in the diplomatic service of the Holy See, representing the Holy See at the United Nations in Geneva and many international conferences. He became a bishop in 1999 and an archbishop in 2001.

== Early life and education ==
Diarmuid Martin was raised and educated in Dublin, at the Oblate school in Inchicore, the De La Salle School situated on the Ballyfermot Road in Ballyfermot, and Marian College, Ballsbridge. He went to University College Dublin, where he studied philosophy, and then went to the Dublin Diocese's seminary at Holy Cross College (Dublin), where he studied theology. He entered Clonliffe seven days before the opening of the Second Vatican Council on 11 October 1962.

He was ordained a priest on 25 May 1969 by Archbishop John Charles McQuaid. Martin is also an alumnus of the Pontifical University of St. Thomas Aquinas Angelicum where he pursued further studies.

His brother, Seamus Martin, was the International Editor of The Irish Times newspaper.

== Work for the Holy See ==
In 1976, Martin entered the service of the Holy See, working for the Pontifical Council for the Family. He later worked on the Pontifical Council for Justice and Peace, was appointed Under Secretary in 1986 and Secretary in 1994. On 6 January 1999 he was consecrated titular Bishop of Glendalough by Pope John Paul II. On 17 January 2001, he was appointed titular Archbishop of the same see when he was appointed the Holy See's Permanent Observer at the United Nations Office at Geneva and other Specialised Agencies there, including the World Trade Organization. In this capacity, he represented the Holy See at various UN conferences, including the International Conference on Population and Development. He led the delegations of the Holy See to the Ministerial Conference of the World Trade Organization (Doha, 2001), the World Conference against Racism, Racial Discrimination, Xenophobia and Related Intolerance.

During the 1990s, Martin represented the Holy See at major United Nations International Conferences, spoke about the Church's teachings on social matters at a variety of Episcopal Conferences, and was a member of various Vatican Offices, including the Central Committee for the Great Jubilee of the Year 2000. Also, he was involved in discussions between the World Council of Churches and the Catholic Church as well as the World Faiths Development Dialogue. He represented the views of the Holy See to the International Monetary Fund and the World Bank, where he advocated for debt relief for less developed countries.

== Archbishop of Dublin ==
Martin was appointed Coadjutor to Cardinal Desmond Connell on 3 May 2003 and was installed on 30 August. On 26 April 2004, following the acceptance of Cardinal Connell's resignation by Pope John Paul II, Martin automatically succeeded him as Archbishop of Dublin.

=== Traditional Latin Mass ===
Following Pope Benedict XVI's decree Summorum Pontificum liberalising the use of the Latin Mass, which took effect on 14 September 2007, Martin established a Latin Mass Chaplaincy in the Dublin City area.

=== Gay priests ===
In 2005 Martin said that being gay should not prevent a man becoming a Catholic priest. He said: "You don't write off a candidate for the priesthood simply because he is a gay man." He discussed the admission of homosexuals to the priesthood in the context of the sexual abuse of minors by priests: "You have to say that horrendous damage was done to people. Then you need to take steps to ensure this will never happen again." He noted that "you cannot identify homosexuality with paedophilia" and that paedophilia is "not the result of homosexuality, nor is it a result of celibacy". His remarks preceded the Congregation for Catholic Education's publication in November of a document on the same subject and later clarification that banned homosexuals who did not live chastely for at least three years.

=== Missionary work ===
In 2007, Martin announced that "a Catholic Church representative will visit every household in the Dublin Archdiocese next year. He predicted his evangelisation programme would promote greater co-operation between lay people and priests in the Church's mission and ministry".

=== Civil partnerships legislation ===
In response to comments by Cardinal Seán Brady on the Civil Partnership Bill, Martin said: "We haven't expressed an opinion as an Episcopal Conference [on the bill]. I don't think anyone in the conference is against what Cardinal Brady said, but they may have said it in different ways." He also said that while the Catholic Church favoured marriage, "it is not against other forms of intimacy".

Martin told the Irish Independent in 2004 that "I recognise that there are many different kinds of caring relationships and these often create dependencies for those involved. The State may feel in justice that the rights of people in these relationships need to be protected." He emphasised he was not thinking mainly of homosexual relationships, but rather of caring, dependent relationships in general. At the same time, he said, he did not exclude homosexual relationships. Martin said: "I have a wide range of relationships in mind. I do not exclude gay relationships but my main concern is with all caring relationships where dependencies have come into being."

=== 50th International Eucharistic Congress ===
At the end of the 49th International Eucharistic Congress held in Quebec in 2008, Pope Benedict XVI announced that the next International Eucharistic Congress would be held in Dublin in 2012, the second time that Dublin hosts the congress, the first being the 31st congress in 1932. On 11 November 2010, Pope Benedict met with Martin and members of the organising committee of the 50th Eucharistic Congress as well as participants in the plenary assembly of the Pontifical Committee for International Eucharistic Congresses in the Sala Clementina of the Apostolic Palace. In May 2012, Martin said that the congress which begins in Dublin on 10 June "will reflect the Church in Ireland today. It will not be a going back to the church of 1932 or any other period. ... Its strength will be the quality of people's faith, not numbers. It will be a congress of prayer".

=== Credibility deficit of Church ===
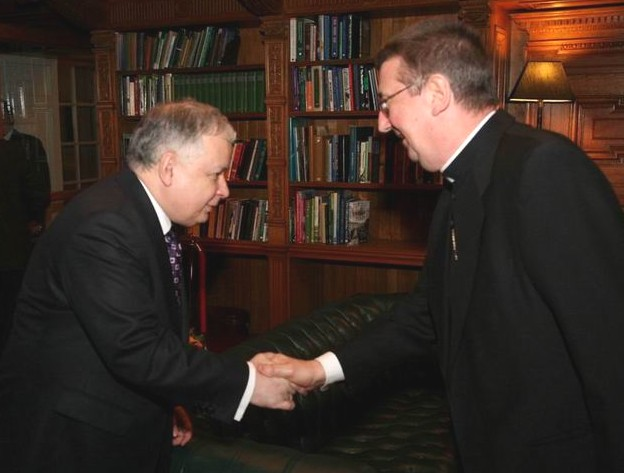
Archbishop Martin meeting Polish President Lech Kaczyński

Speaking in Dublin at a discussion organised by the Communion and Liberation lay Catholic movement, Martin said that, when the Church speaks, it faces a severe hindrance: "When I was younger, if you did your Leaving Certificate examination through the medium of Irish you got a bonus on your mark – I think it was either a 10 per cent or 15 per cent – just for that fact. Today for the Church to make a credible statement on many aspects of public life or simply to talk about faith you start out with the opposite. You start out with a substantial percentage of credibility deficit." He wondered: "How does one really begin to speak about faith? How does one attempt to reach out and lead young people on a journey of faith, when they in many ways have lost trust in a Church which many young people find no longer just 'irrelevant' but ... in which many young people say they have very little confidence".

Martin addressed this topic again on Holy Thursday 2009, saying that the two biggest problems facing young people were the Catholic Church's condemnation of gay couples and the question of suicide. He said that these were causing "a disconnect" which was causing "a dramatic and growing rift" between the Church and the younger generation. He accepted that this was partly the Church's fault because young people were much more questioning today than previously and he urged his priests to offer services in the parish that would be geared more towards their particular concerns. He said that young people "see through the superficial answers we give". He added: "Our young people are generous and idealistic but such generosity and idealism does not seem to find a home in the Church. Where are we offering young people a home in our Church communities? Where are the focal points where we are helping young people to find an interpretation of their generosity, idealism and questioning in the light of the challenge and of the beauty of the message of Jesus Christ?"

=== Commission on child sexual abuse ===
On Holy Thursday 2009, he also warned that the depth of the Catholic sex abuse cases "will shock us all", throwing up challenges to the Catholic Church in Ireland it has never experienced before. Martin said: "It is likely that thousands of children or young people across Ireland were abused by priests in the period under investigation and the horror of that abuse was not recognised for what it is. The report will make each of us and the entire church in Dublin a humbler church". Martin also asked for the "forgiveness of anyone that I may have hurt or left feeling neglected. I know my own failings and limitations and I wish to renew sincerely today my respect and concern for each and every priest of this diocese or working in this diocese".

On 25 May 2009, Martin stated in the Irish Times (partially quoting a correspondent):

There is always a price to pay for not responding. The church will have to pay that price in terms of its credibility. The first thing the church has to do is to move out of any mode of denial. Where the church is involved in social care it should be in the vanguard. That is different to a situation in which the church proclaims that it is in the vanguard.... in a very short time another report on the sexual abuse of children will be published, this time about how such abuse was managed in the Archdiocese of Dublin of which I am archbishop.

=== Red Mass 2009 ===
Addressing on 5 October 2009 a congregation that included Supreme Court and High Court judges, at the formal opening of the law term, Martin warned that ongoing prosperity could not on its own bring the harmony which society requires. Urging the congregation to work to strengthen the fabric of society and make it more caring, he said self-indulgence could lead to corruption, total disregard for the rights of others, a breakdown of community and violence. Violence, he added, was "a continual threat to the harmony of society" in Ireland, was "profoundly anti-democratic" and attempted to "limit the effectiveness of community through a climate of fear". Speaking of "those whose mission it is to advance legislation which promotes harmony and equality and those whose mission it is to apply such laws and administer justice", he said: "Yours is a task of the spirit: to ensure that true communication in the fullest sense between people is not inhibited by the raw power of the self-interest of the few".

=== Murphy Report ===
On 26 November 2009, the Murphy Report into abuse carried out by priests and covered up to varying degrees by the four preceding Archbishops of Dublin, namely, John Charles McQuaid, Dermot Ryan, Kevin McNamara, and Desmond Connell, was published. The report, which took three years to complete, said the archdiocese had an "obsessive concern with secrecy and the avoidance of scandal" and had "little or no concern for the welfare of the abused child". The investigating commission identified 320 individuals who complained of abuse between 1975 and 2004, and noted that 130 complaints had been made since May 2004. In a letter to the priests and laity read out at all Masses on Sunday 29 November 2009, Martin wrote that "The damage done to children abused by priests can never be undone. As Archbishop of Dublin and as Diarmuid Martin I offer to each and every survivor, my apology, my sorrow and my shame for what happened to them. I am aware however that no words of apology will ever be sufficient".

Martin said on 1 December 2009 that he was writing to Bishop of Limerick Donal Murray, a former auxiliary bishop of the Dublin diocese who was strongly criticised in the report but who, while saying he regretted his actions, did not immediately resign from his Limerick post, and to all other auxiliary bishops who served in Dublin and who were named in the report. He said he was "not satisfied" with some of their responses so far. He pointed out that those bishops named in the report, but no longer serving in the Dublin archdiocese, could not tailor their responses to people in their current dioceses. "What they did and did not do failed people in Dublin and they owe them a response."

On 11 December, Archbishop Martin and Cardinal Brady met with Pope Benedict XVI to discuss the Murphy Report. Pope Benedict was accompanied by a group of Curial officials including the Cardinal Secretary of State and the Cardinal Prefects of the Congregation for Bishops, the Congregation for the Doctrine of the Faith, the Congregation for the Clergy, and the Congregation for Institutes of Consecrated Life and Societies of Apostolic Life. The Apostolic Nuncio to Ireland, Archbishop Giuseppe Leanza, also attended. Asked if the meeting and the ensuing Vatican statement would go some way to answering criticism about the perceived silence of the Holy See in the wake of the publication of the report, Martin said: "What appeared to us today is that maybe things were not said but certainly people were reflecting on matters".

Some survivors of child abuse and their representatives reacted negatively to the Holy See's statement. Marie Collins, who was abused in 1960 by a priest when she was a patient at Our Lady's Hospital for Sick Children in Crumlin, said: "I can’t say I was disappointed because I didn’t have any high hopes." Acknowledging the sincerity of the pope's call for prayers for those abused and their families, and possible initiatives where reorganisation of the Irish Church was concerned, she pointed out the statement "doesn't deal with the past. No one has taken responsibility for what went on in Dublin. There is no accountability".

In his Christmas sermon, Martin said the church for too long placed its self-interest above the rights of its parishioners, particularly innocent children. He said they, as well as the dedicated majority of priests, had been betrayed by their leaders. "It has been a painful year", he told worshippers at St Mary's Pro-Cathedral in Dublin. "But the church today may well be a better and safer place than was the church of 25 years ago – when all looked well, but where deep shadows were kept buried." On 11 August 2010, however, it was revealed that Pope Benedict had not accepted the resignations of Bishops Walsh and Field. "Following the presentation of their resignations to Pope Benedict, it has been decided that Bishop Eamonn Walsh and Bishop Raymond Field will remain as auxiliary bishops", Archbishop Martin said in a letter to priests of the diocese

Martin came in for criticism among other high ranking clergy for calling for the resignations of bishops mentioned in the Murphy report. In the Connacht Tribune, Father Tony Flannery was critical of how Martin communicated with his own auxiliary bishops: "These bishops are not recalcitrant teenagers; they are intelligent and mature men, so it was pathetic of Diarmuid Martin to use the media to communicate with them". In January 2010, the Archbishop expressed surprise at claims made in the previous month by Bishop of Galway Martin Drennan that he had attacked Drennan's integrity. Drennan had said: "I don't know if Martin intended it or not but it has put a question mark over my integrity, yes. Now that I've responded to him and given him the evidence he needs he might want to reflect on that and see what response he should make to it." On 22 January, Martin said: "I'm surprised that anybody would say that, by asking people to be accountable, to stand up and explain themselves, that was an attack on anyone's integrity." He said he had received much correspondence supporting him for saying people should be accountable, which did not mean heads should roll, he said.

Auxiliary Bishop Emeritus of Dublin Dermot O'Mahony said Martin had failed to support priests in the Dublin diocese following publication of the Murphy report. "The archbishop did nothing to counteract the statement of the Murphy report, widely circulated in the media, that the majority of clergy knew and did nothing. Indeed, I feel he made matters worse by giving an example of a parish that could be clearly identifiable to the priests of the diocese," wrote O’Mahony in letters sent to Martin and the Council of Priests. He added: "To suggest our approach failed to take cognisance of the safety of children is inaccurate and unjust. The acceptance by media and current diocese policy that a cover-up took place must be challenged". He circulated his own correspondence with Martin to the Council of Priests.

In a letter to Martin on 30 December, Bishop O'Mahony wrote that he had been shocked at the tone of a previous letter he had received from Martin, which had addressed the Murphy report. A spokeswoman for Martin told The Irish Times that this letter to O’Mahony, which was dated 2 December 2009, had been sent following a detailed conversation between them. It was sent three days after a meeting of the diocesan council that discussed the Murphy report.

A meeting of priests heard demands that Martin be confronted over his handling of the fallout from the Murphy report and claims that the archbishop had become "a source of division" among priests and bishops. Archbishop Martin in August 2010 said that bishops have "a long history of a lack of unity".

==== Pope's Pastoral Letter to Irish Catholics ====
Pope Benedict's letter to Irish Catholics was signed on 19 March 2010 and released on 20 March. Archbishop Martin welcomed the pope's statement, describing it not as a final word but as "a further step in the process of renewal and healing in the Catholic Church in Ireland following the crisis of the sexual abuse of children". Martin said the pope acknowledged the suffering and betrayal experienced by survivors of clerical abuse. "The pope recognises the failures of Church authorities in how they dealt with sinful and criminal acts," he said.

==== Refusal to call for resignation of Cardinal Brady ====
In response to a journalist's question following publicity given to Cardinal Brady's role in canonical investigations in 1975 concerning paedophile priest Brendan Smyth, Martin commented: "I never tell people to resign. I never said people should stay. I ask for accountability. Resigning is a personal decision a person has to make on their own. People should be accountable, and render account of what they've done. Resignations are personal decisions." Asked whether it was acceptable that Cardinal Brady did not stop Smyth after the 1975 investigation, he said Smyth "was not stopped by who had the power to stop him", and "somebody should have stopped him".

In the same interview Martin was asked if he had been recently silenced by the church. He replied: "No, I haven't been asked to stop talking. I gave four major interviews in the last four weeks to Irish and international television." Asked if he had been ostracised by other members of the church, he said: "I do things in my own way, which may not please everybody, but in no way was I ostracised. I have to maintain also my own independence of thought."

==== Apostolic visitation ====
In October 2010, the four metropolitan archbishops of Ireland, Michael Neary of Tuam, Seán Brady of Armagh, Diarmuid Martin of Dublin and Dermot Clifford of Cashel and Emly, met for high-level talks with heads of Vatican congregations regarding the apostolic visitation. This visitation was prompted by the publication of the Murphy and Ryan reports. While in Rome, the metropolitans met a team of investigators appointed by Pope Benedict to examine the four provinces and "some other as yet unspecified dioceses". The team included: the Cardinal-Archbishop Emeritus of Westminster, Cormac Murphy-O'Connor, who inspected Armagh; the Archbishop of Boston, Seán O'Malley, who inspected Dublin; the Archbishop of Toronto, Thomas Christopher Collins, who inspected Cashel; the Archbishop of Ottawa, Terrence Prendergast, who inspected Tuam. An investigation of the state of Irish seminaries will be conducted by Cardinal Timothy Dolan of New York. The apostolic visitors reported their findings directly to Pope Benedict XVI.

Archbishop Martin on 20 February 2011 said that the Church has a long way to journey in honesty before it merits forgiveness for the abuse of children. Archbishop Martin then made what victims said was the most explicit apology to date for the role of the Church hierarchy in enabling the abuse. Three of the victims held hands and sobbed as Martin poured water on their feet and Cardinal O'Malley dried them with a towel. During the service Archbishop Martin said "I can express my sorrow, my sense of the wrong that was done to you. I think of how you were not heard or not believed and not comforted and supported. I can ask myself how did this happen in the Church of Jesus Christ where as we heard in the Gospel children are presented to us as signs of the kingdom. How did we not see you in your suffering and abandonment?" He continued: "Someone once reminded me of the difference between on the one hand apologising or saying sorry and on the other hand asking forgiveness. I can bump into someone on the street and say "Sorry". It can be meaningful or just an empty formula. When I say sorry I am in charge. When I ask forgiveness however I am no longer in charge, I am in the hands of the others. Only you can forgive me; only God can forgive me. I, as Archbishop of Dublin and as Diarmuid Martin, stand here in this silence and I ask forgiveness of God and I ask for the first steps of forgiveness from all of the survivors of abuse."

==== Comments on Vatican response to report ====
In May 2011 Archbishop Martin emphasised he was not criticising Pope Benedict, but was encouraging a sense of urgency on the part of the Pope's "collaborators" in the Roman Curia. Speaking in Dublin he said the pace of change in Irish religious culture was such that "the longer the delay in advancing the fruits of the apostolic visitation, the greater the danger of false expectations, and the greater the encouragement to those who prefer immobilism to reform, and the greater the threat to the effectiveness of this immense gift of the Holy Father to the Irish Church". He was "impatient to learn about the path that the apostolic visitation will set out for renewal for the Irish Church so that our renewal will move forward decisively. At the same time, I am also becoming increasingly impatient at the slowness in the process, which began over a year ago. This is not a criticism of the Holy Father. It is an appeal to his collaborators." His "greatest concern" was "the rift which is growing between the church and young people".

=== Church role in education ===
In March 2010, Martin welcomed an announcement by Minister for Education Batt O'Keeffe that his department "will shortly be providing an initial list of about 10 urban areas that can be used to test the concept of reducing the number of Catholic schools". Martin also said that solutions would have to be found to respect the rights of teachers "who do not wish to be involved in religious education". He welcomed the fact that "the Minister has indicated that there will be consultations with parents, teachers and local communities". Minister O'Keefe said that "the issue of the Catholic Church divesting itself of certain schools was originally explicitly raised by Archbishop Diarmuid Martin and it has also found expression in the work of the Bishops' Conference and through its engagement with my department." He said that the archbishop's "public identification of this reality" was "a timely and important contribution not just to the future of Catholic schools but to the future of the primary sector generally," he said.

"In overall terms, I know it has been acknowledged that the Catholic primary sector, which currently represents over 90 per cent of overall provision, may ultimately fall to between 50 per cent and 60 per cent of overall provision and that this percentage of overall provision will still be enough to allow the church fulfil its expressed commitment to meet the needs of parents who wish their children to have a Catholic education."

=== Comments on the Cloyne report ===
On 13 July 2011 the report in the sexual abuse in the diocese of Cloyne was published. Archbishop Martin said on reading his report that his "first emotion that came to me was anger". Archbishop Martin warned that further investigations of clerical child sex abuse in dioceses will not get to the truth if people in the Catholic Church are not prepared to tell the truth. Senior church figures who were not prepared to be honest would only be "discovered" through an "invasive" audit of child protection practices in their dioceses, he said. He said the Vatican, in responding to the findings of last week's report on child abuse cases in the Cloyne diocese, should reiterate its support for the Irish church in applying existing "norms", or rules, on child protection. The Vatican should also support the reporting of cases to the State authorities and the carrying out of audits to show exactly where the situation was in relation to child protection. He acknowledged that people could feel deceived by the church. He said the norms set down by the present pope in 2001 had been ignored in the Cloyne diocese. "What sort of a cabal is in there and still refusing to recognise the norms of the church?" he asked. All the other Irish bishops had put these norms into practice, "as far as I know", he added. Martin said six elderly priests were verbally abused at a colleague's funeral this week when someone challenged them, claiming they "should be ashamed of themselves". "Those who felt they were able to play tricks with norms, they have betrayed those good men and so many others in the church who are working today," he said.

=== Third Edition of the Roman Missal ===
In August 2011 Archbishop Martin defended the new English translation of the Roman Missal entering into force by Advent 2011. A gradual introduction of the missal began at Masses in Ireland from 11 September. The new translation came into full use throughout Ireland and the English-speaking Catholic world on the first Sunday of Advent, 27 November 2011. In a letter to the priests of the Dublin diocese the August before, Martin said that since the prior Roman Missal was introduced in 1975, "many additional texts have been made available for use. These include new Eucharistic prayers for reconciliation I and II, and for Masses for various needs I to IV, Masses for the Blessed Virgin Mary, Masses for new feasts of saints, and other new material." Those familiar with translations in other languages had come to realise "that often there were key phrases and rich biblical allusions missing from the English translation" in the current missal, he said. Also, "some theological vocabulary had been lost in the 1975 edition" and the new missal "addresses some of these weaknesses". Changes to the wording of the Confiteor, the Gloria and the Creed are included in the new Roman Missal.

=== 2014 Extraordinary General Assembly of the Synod of Bishops ===
Martin gave a speech at the Synod and said later that the bishops' Synod on the Family must show that church teaching can develop so it can respond to the difficulties faced by ordinary Catholics. "This synod can't simply repeat what was said 20 years ago," Archbishop Martin told journalists at a briefing in the Vatican halfway through the two weeks of discussions. "It has to find new language to show that there can be development of doctrine, that there has been a willingness to listen to what emerged in the questionnaire that went out and what was said at the synod itself." The questionnaire before the synod asked Catholics around the world a range of questions on family life including issues such as divorced and remarried couples, same-sex unions and contraception.

Archbishop Martin said this Synod on the family had been very "different" but it would be misleading to suggest that it will lead to immediate change in relation to "celebrity" issues such as homosexuality and communion for the divorced, explaining: "There can be a development of doctrine in the sense that we can understand the same doctrine in a different way, but a change whereby, overnight, you say that what was wrong is now right, that is just not on the cards." Martin said this Synod has been radically different because, thanks to Pope Francis, it has been marked by a genuine dialogue and an at times heated debate. However, he said the Pope has so far "given no indication as to where he stands on anything" for the reason that this is a three-year-long process that will be concluded only when the Pope himself issues his post-Synodal apostolic exhortation, after the second leg of this Family Synod in October 2015.

=== Homeless initiative ===
On 2 December 2014 Archbishop Martin offered to house some of the city's homeless people in church property, after a homeless man was found dead metres away from Leinster House, one of the parliament buildings. The body of 42-year-old Jonathan Corrie was found by a passer-by in a doorway in November 2014. Archbishop Martin said one of his diocesan buildings could be made suitable before Christmas to provide shelter for between 30 and 40 homeless people in the inner city.

=== Islam ===
Archbishop Martin has said that 2016 comments by Raymond Cardinal Burke on Islam's supposed desire to "govern the world" are unhelpful at a time when Europe reels in the aftermath of a spate of terror attacks. The archbishop decried the murder of French priest, Fr. Jacques Hamel, in Normandy as "something that no religion would stand over," adding that the atrocity in the small parish church of Saint Etienne du Rouvray has been "horrifying to everyone" and that people have been "absolutely stunned by the brutality" of it. Speaking from Poland where he was attending World Youth Day, Martin stressed that education is the basis for real tolerance as well as knowledge and respect for other religions. While Burke, in an interview on his new book, said that Islam seeks to govern the world and that the only way to save Western civilization is to return it to its Christian roots, Martin countered: "I don't think that helps at all." He added, "Does Islam want to rule the world? There may be some people of the Islamic faith who do, but Islam itself has another side within it -- a caring and a tolerant side."

=== Abortion ===
On 6 January 2019, Martin called for caution in constructing anti-abortion protests outside of abortion clinics. "I'm not a person personally for protest," he said. "What the Church should be doing is strengthening its resolve to help women in crisis and to educate people." Martin also called for protections for medical workers who refused to assist with abortions due to conscientious objections.

== Future of the Church in Ireland ==
Archbishop Martin said in a speech on the future of the Church on 10 May 2010 that the Gospel reminds "us that the Father would send the Spirit who, at each moment in the history of the Church, would teach us all things in Jesus' name. In that sense I cannot be pessimistic about the future of the Church in Ireland." He continued saying that "The future of the Catholic Church in Ireland will see a very different Catholic Church in Ireland. I sometimes worry when I hear those with institutional responsibility stress the role of the institution and others then in reaction saying that 'we are the Church'. Perhaps on both sides there may be an underlying feeling that 'I am the Church', that the Church must be modelled on my way of thinking or on my position. Renewal is never our own creation. Renewal will only come through returning to the Church which we have received from the Lord."

On Church teaching, Archbishop Martin said that, "There are further challenges to be addressed regarding Church teaching. Within the Church and outside of it discussion focuses around challenges in the area of sexual morality where the Church's teaching is either not understood or is simply rejected as out of tune with contemporary culture. There is on the other hand very little critical examination of some of the roots of that contemporary culture and its compatibility with the teaching of Jesus. The moral teaching of the Church cannot simply be a blessing for, a toleration of, or an adaptation to the cultural climate of the day."

On the need for greater evangelisation he said that "The use of modern media mechanisms to support the distribution of the Gospel is something important and innovative. In this context, we are very fortunate to have a group of scripture scholars who put their knowledge and personal perception of the scriptures at the service of parishes and bible study groups. This material is accessible to any individual who would wish to avail of it on the website www.yearofevangelisation.ie."

On 20 February 2011, he made what was regarded by abuse survivors as his most explicit apology yet.

At a talk on the future of Irish Catholicism on 22 February 2011 for the Cambridge Group for Irish Studies, Magdalene College, Cambridge, Archbishop Martin said that "there are parishes in Dublin where the presence at Sunday Mass is some 5% of the Catholic population and, in some cases, even below 2%. On any particular Sunday about 18% of the Catholic population in the Archdiocese of Dublin attends Mass. That is considerably lower than in any other part of Ireland." He continued saying: "(That) the conformist Ireland of the Archbishop McQuaid era changed so rapidly and with few tears, was read as an indication of a desire for change, but perhaps it was also an indication that the conformism was covering an emptiness and a faith built on a faulty structure to which people no longer really ascribed" and that "The Catholic Church in Ireland will inevitably become more a minority culture. The challenge is to ensure that it is not an irrelevant minority culture".

== 2011 general election comments ==
Archbishop Martin in February 2011 called on Christians in Ireland to be vocal about the values they want for "a caring" society. Addressing a Church celebration of the World Day of the Sick in Clontarf, Archbishop Martin said: "We stand at an important moment regarding the future of our Irish society." He continued saying "In a climate marked too often only by criticism and mud-slinging, we Christians are called to drive for a sense of common purpose regarding the type of society we wish our political leaders to generate and the values that we would wish to see enshrined in that society." Shortly afterwards the Irish Catholic Bishops' Conference released a guide to voters for the general election.

== 2015 Same Sex Marriage Referendum ==
In response to the passing of the thirty-fourth amendment of the constitution of Ireland, which inserted a clause into the Irish Constitution permitting same sex marriage, Martin stated that "The Church needs to take a reality check. It's very clear there’s a growing gap between Irish young people and the Church, and there’s a growing gap between the culture of Ireland that's developing and the Church."

== Retirement ==
On 29 December 2020, Pope Francis accepted Martin's resignation, which he had submitted as required upon turning 75 in April 2020. Bishop Dermot Farrell was named to succeed him.

== See also ==
Roman Catholic Church sex abuse scandal

Catholic Church titles
Preceded by Desmond Connell	Archbishop of Dublin; 26 April 2004 – 29 December 2020	Succeeded by Dermot Farrell
Preceded by Jan Pieter Schotte	Secretary of the Pontifical Council for Justice and Peace; 1994– 17 January 2001	Succeeded by Giampaolo Crepaldi
Diplomatic posts
Preceded by Giuseppe Bertello	Permanent Observer of the Holy See to the United Nations in Geneva; 17 January 2001 – 3 March 2003	Succeeded by Silvano Maria Tomasi
