= Dermot Ryan =

The Most Reverend Dermot Ryan
- Archbishop of Dublin; Primate of Ireland
- Church: Roman Catholic Church
- Archdiocese: Dublin
- See: Dublin
- Appointed: 29 December 1971
- Term ended: 1 September 1984
- Predecessor: John Charles McQuaid
- Successor: Kevin McNamara
- Other post: Pro-Prefect of the Congregation for the Propagation of the Faith (1984–1985)

Orders
- Ordination: 28 May 1950
- Consecration: 13 February 1972 by Pope Paul VI

Personal details
- Born: Dermot Joseph Ryan; 26 June 1924 Dublin, Ireland
- Died: 21 February 1985 (aged 60) Rome, Italy
- Buried: Saint Mary's Pro-Cathedral
- Education: Clonliffe College; University College Dublin

Dermot J. Ryan (26 June 1924 – 21 February 1985) was the Roman Catholic Archbishop of Dublin, Ireland from 1972 until 1984.

== Early life and education ==
Born Dermot Joseph Ryan in 1924, to Andrew Ryan a medical doctor and Therese nee McKenna, in Clondalkin, Dublin. In 1932 he went to Belvedere College, Dublin. In 1942 he entered Holy Cross College, Clonliffe, and graduated with a first in Hebrew and Aramaic in UCD in 1945, he spent a year in Maynooth before attending the Irish College in Rome gaining his BD in 1948 at the St. John Lateran University, Rome, and returned to Clonliffe to complete his formation, where he was ordained, a priest on 28 May 1950. Ryan returned to Rome to study at the Pontifical Gregorian University, gaining a licentiate in sacred theology in 1952. In 1954 he was awarded an MA in Semitic Languages from the NUI and followed by a licentiate in sacred scripture at the Pontifical Biblical Institute.

== Professor and scholar ==
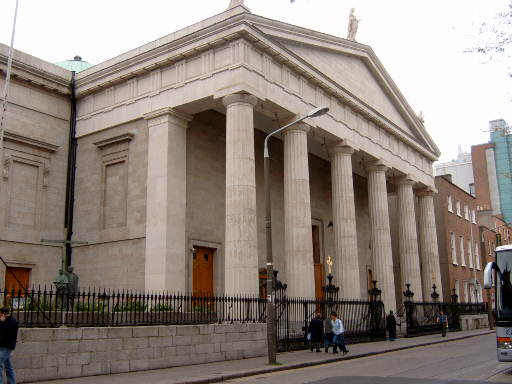
St Mary's Pro-Cathedral in Dublin

Dermot Ryan, a native of Dublin was Professor of Oriental Languages at University College Dublin before his appointment by Pope Paul VI as Archbishop of Dublin and Primate of Ireland on 29 December 1971. Maintaining his connection and interest in oriental studies he served as chairman of the trustees of the Chester Beatty Library from 1978-1984.

He was ordained a bishop by Pope Paul VI in Rome assisted by Cardinals Bernard Alfrink and William Conway (Archbishop of Armagh and Primate of All Ireland), on 13 February 1972. At the time of his appointment, he was seen as a liberal and a reformer in the Church.

== Diocesan expansion ==
During his term, he consolidated much of the expansion of the Archdiocese which had taken place during the term of his predecessor. He also oversaw the fuller implementation of the reforms of Vatican II. He was particularly interested in liturgical reform.

== Social opinions and activities ==
Seen as a Liberal, following the episcopacy of McQuaid, in November 1972 Dr. Ryan became the first Roman Catholic archbishop to attend a Church of Ireland service in Christ Church cathedral and held an interdenominational service in the pro-cathedral. He also supported ‘Ballymascanlon talks’ an inter-church, initiative to try to bring communities together and peace to Northern Ireland.

Archbishop Ryan also took a traditional stand on social issues, including poverty, family life and opposition to abortion. He strongly promoted the Eighth Amendment of the Constitution of Ireland in 1983, granting the equal right to life to mother and unborn.

He was named in the Murphy Report on sexual abuse of children in Dublin; his lack of actions in respect of complaints against priest Fr. McNamee were described in the report as "an example of how, throughout the 1970s, the church authorities were more concerned with the scandal that would be created by revealing Fr McNamee’s abuse rather than any concern for the abused". He also did not act on complaints against other priests who were subsequently confirmed to be abusers.

== Archbishop Ryan Park ==
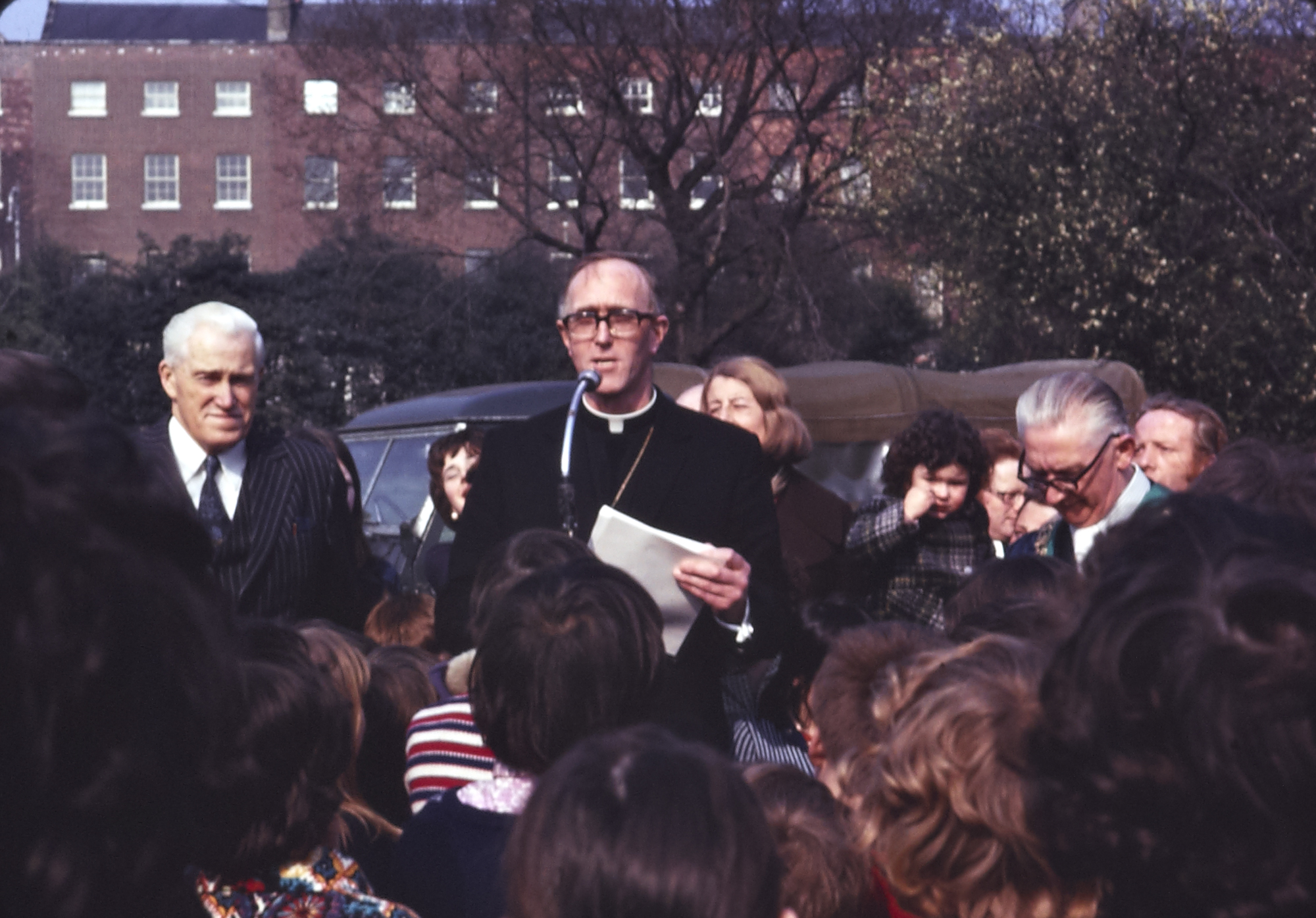
Archbishop of Dublin, Dr. Dermot Ryan, handing over the central park in Merrion Square.

As Archbishop he gave the people of Dublin a public park on a site earmarked by his predecessors for a proposed cathedral; it was named "Archbishop Ryan Park" in his honour. The land, at Merrion Square, was a gift from the Archbishop to the city of Dublin.

In January 2010, after Ryan had been criticised in the Murphy Report the previous year, Dublin City Council sought public views on renaming the Park; in 2010 it was renamed Merrion Square Park by the City Council.

He also served as Pro-Prefect of Congregation for the Evangelization of Peoples from 8 April 1984 until his death in Rome, following a heart attack at the age of 60.

Catholic Church titles
Preceded by Agnelo Rossi as Prefect	Pro-Prefect For The Congregation for the Evangelization of Peoples; April 8, 1984 – February 21, 1985	Succeeded by Jozef Tomko as Prefect
Preceded by John Charles McQuaid	Archbishop of Dublin; 29 December 1971 – 1 September 1984	Succeeded by Kevin McNamara
