= Kevin McNamara (bishop) =

Irish Catholic academic and bishop

The Most Reverend Kevin McNamara
- Archbishop of Dublin; Primate of Ireland
- Church: Roman Catholic
- See: Dublin
- In office: 15 November 1984 – 8 April 1987
- Predecessor: Dermot J. Ryan
- Successor: Desmond Connell
- Previous posts: Kerry (1976–1984); Bishop

Orders
- Ordination: 19 June 1949

Personal details
- Born: 10 June 1926 Newmarket-on-Fergus, Ireland
- Died: 8 April 1987 (aged 60) Dublin, Ireland

Kevin McNamara (10 June 1926 – 8 April 1987) was a senior Irish Catholic academic and bishop who in the early 1980s was seen as one of the most outspoken members of the Irish hierarchy on issues such as abortion and divorce. He served for three years as Archbishop of Dublin before dying of cancer.

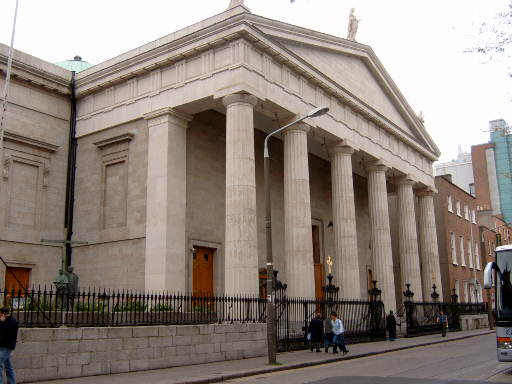
St Mary's Pro-Cathedral in Dublin

== Career ==
Kevin McNamara was ordained a priest in St. Patrick's College Maynooth in June 1949. His natural academic talent was recognised and he was soon appointed to teach moral theology rising to become Professor of Dogmatic Theology.

In 1976, he was appointed by Pope Paul VI to succeed Bishop Eamon Casey in the diocese of Kerry and was ordained bishop in November 1976 from Cardinal William Conway.

In office, McNamara and the neighbouring Bishop of Limerick, Jeremiah Newman, became the most outspoken conservative voices in the Irish hierarchy. They were seemingly out of step with the more diplomatic Archbishop of Armagh and Primate of All Ireland, Tomás Ó Fiaich, and with the Archbishop of Dublin and Primate of Ireland, Dermot Ryan.

McNamara and Newman were particularly outspoken on the issue of a proposed anti-abortion amendment to the Irish constitution. While other bishops advocated people vote with their conscience in the referendum on the issue, McNamara and Newman instructed Catholics that they had a duty to "vote yes" to the referendum.

== Archbishop of Dublin ==
In 1984, the archdiocese of Dublin became vacant when its archbishop, Dermot Ryan, was given a senior appointment in the Roman Curia. (Ryan was expected to be made a cardinal as a result of the appointment but died suddenly in office before a consistory could be held.) McNamara's selection to replace the more liberal Ryan in Dublin created media reports linking his appointment to the ongoing tensions between the papal nuncio in Ireland, Archbishop Alibrandi, and the liberal Fine Gael–Labour Party coalition under Garret FitzGerald. Relations between Alibrandi and the coalition had broken down, with the government requesting that Alibrandi be removed because of his suspected closeness to Irish republicans in Sinn Féin and to the opposition Fianna Fáil party and in particular its leader, Charles Haughey. Critics accused Alibrandi of engineering McNamara's appointment in the belief that the outspoken McNamara could help derail the coalition's liberal policies on divorce and contraception.

McNamara, as expected, took a far more outspoken stance of issues than had Ryan previously. While the coalition succeeded in liberalising the law on contraception, its efforts to amend the constitution on divorce were defeated.

Styles of Kevin McNamara
- Reference style: The Most Reverend
- Spoken style: Your Grace
- Religious style: Monsignor

== Death ==
McNamara's service in Dublin was short-lived. Already suffering from what proved to be terminal cancer, Archbishop McNamara died in April 1987 after a three year battle with the disease, months after the Fine Gael minority government had been defeated in the 1987 general election.

Archbishop McNamara was succeeded as archbishop by a university lecturer, Desmond Connell.

== Later linked to non-reporting of clerical sex abuse cases ==
In the early 2000s, amid growing scandals within the Catholic Church in Ireland about clerical sex abuse, it was revealed that as archbishop Kevin McNamara had sought legal advice as to the Church's liability arising from such abuse.

Catholic Church titles
Preceded by Dermot Ryan	Archbishop of Dublin; 15 November 1984 – 8 April 1987	Succeeded by Desmond Connell
