= Roman Catholic Archdiocese of Dublin =

Lead diocese of the Metropolitan Province of Dublin, Ireland

Coordinates: 53°21′03″N 6°15′33″W

Archdiocese of Dublin Archidioecesis Dublinensis Ard-Deoise Bhaile Átha Cliath

Catholic
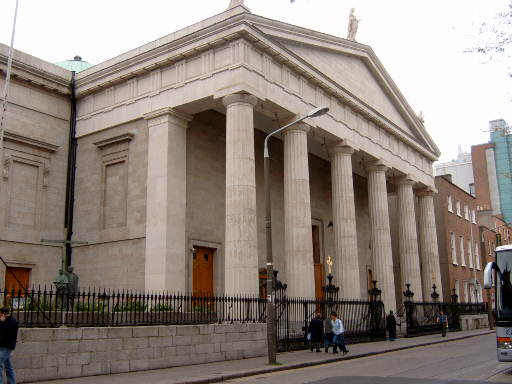
- St Mary's Cathedral, Dublin

Location
- Country: Ireland
- Territory: City of Dublin, most of counties Dublin and Wicklow, and parts of counties Carlow, Kildare, Laois and Wexford
- Ecclesiastical province: Province of Dublin

Statistics
- Area: 1,229 sq mi (3,180 km^{2})
- Population: Total; Catholics: (as of 2019); 1,570,149; 1,093,095 (69.6%)

Information
- Denomination: Catholic
- Sui iuris church: Latin Church
- Rite: Roman Rite
- Established: Diocese in 1028; Archdiocese in 1152
- Cathedral: St Mary's Cathedral, Dublin
- Patron saint: Kevin; Laurence O'Toole

Current leadership
- Pope: Leo XIV
- Archbishop: Dermot Farrell
- Auxiliary Bishops: Paul Dempsey; Donal Roche
- Vicar General: Fr. Gareth Byrne; Msgr. Ciarán O'Carroll
- Bishops emeritus: Diarmuid Martin, Archbishop of Dublin; Raymond Field, Auxiliary Bishop of Dublin; Éamonn Walsh, Auxiliary Bishop of Dublin

Map
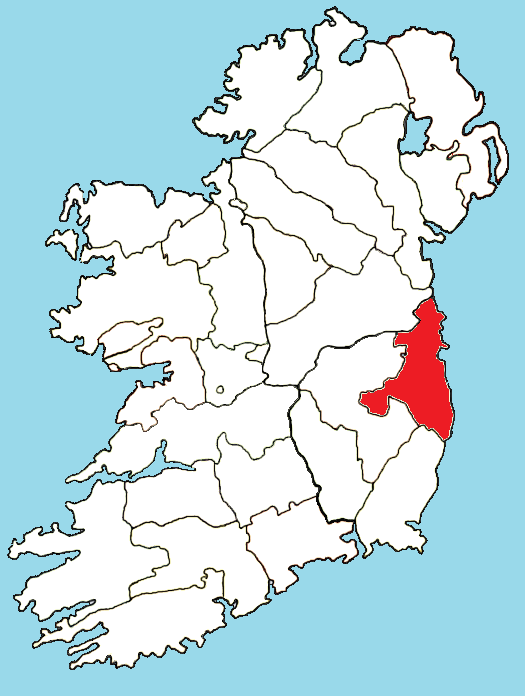

Website
- dublindiocese.ie

The Archdiocese of Dublin (Irish: Ard-Deoise Bhaile Átha Cliath) is a Latin Church ecclesiastical territory or archdiocese of the Catholic Church located in the eastern part of Ireland. Its archepiscopal see includes the republic's capital city – Dublin. The cathedral church of the archdiocese is St Mary's Cathedral. Dublin was formally recognised as a metropolitan province in 1152 by the Synod of Kells. Its second archbishop, Lorcán Ua Tuathail (Anglicised as St Laurence O'Toole), is also its patron saint.

As of 2021, the incumbent Ordinary and metropolitan of the Metropolitan Province of Dublin is Archbishop Dermot Farrell, who was appointed on 29 December 2020 and installed on 2 February 2021.

== Province and geographic remit ==
The Province of Dublin is one of four ecclesiastical provinces that together form the Catholic Church in Ireland; the other provinces are Armagh, Tuam and Cashel. The geographical remit of the province includes the city of Dublin, all of the historical County Dublin (counties Fingal, South Dublin, Dún Laoghaire–Rathdown), most of County Wicklow, and fragments of counties Kildare, Carlow, Wexford and Laois.

Large population centres include the city of Dublin, Dún Laoghaire, Tallaght and Malahide. The archdiocese also contains several large towns: Arklow, Athy, Balbriggan, Bray, Celbridge, Greystones, Leixlip, Maynooth and Swords. Altogether it covers an area of 698,277 statute acres (2,825 km^{2}). The suffragan dioceses of the province are:

- Ferns
- Kildare and Leighlin
- Ossory

== History ==
=== Pre-diocesan ecclesiastical history ===
The Dublin area was Christian long before the formal establishment of the diocese. There are vestigial remains and memory of monasteries that were famous before that time at Finglas, Glasnevin, Glendalough, Kilnamanagh, Rathmichael, Swords, Tallaght, among others. They witness to the faith of earlier generations and to a flourishing Church life. Several of these functioned as "head churches", the most important of which was Glendalough.

The monastic basis of the early church power vested the greatest authority in the abbots of the major communities. While there were bishops, they were not organised dioceses in the modern sense. In many cases, the offices of abbot and bishop were often comprised in one person. Although Ware's Antiquities of Ireland mentions "Bishops of Dublin" dating as far back as 633, the Diocese of Dublin per se is not considered to have begun until 1038. When formal organised dioceses began to emerge in Ireland, all of the current Diocese of Dublin, and more, was comprised within the Diocese of Glendalough.

=== The Danish Diocese of Dublin ===
Following a reverted conversion by one Norse King of Dublin, Sitric, his son Godfrey became Christian in 943, and the Kingdom of Dublin sought to have a bishop of their own in the eleventh century, notably under Sitric MacAulaf, who had been on pilgrimage to Rome. He sent his chosen candidate, Donat (or Donagh or Donatus) to be consecrated in Canterbury in 1028, and the new prelate had his Diocese of Dublin as a small territory within the walled city, over which he presided until 1074. This new diocese was not part of the church in Ireland but rather part of the Norse Province of Canterbury. Sitric also provided for the building of Christ Church Cathedral in 1028 "with the lands of Baldoyle, Raheny and Portrane for its maintenance."

At the Synod of Rathbreasail, convened in 1111 on papal authority by Gillebert (Gilbert), Bishop of Limerick, the number of dioceses in Ireland was fixed at twenty-four. Dublin was not included, the city being described as lying within the Diocese of Glendalough. However, the Danish bishopric continued, still attached to Canterbury.

=== Synod of Kells (1152) and elevation ===
In 1151, Pope Eugene III commissioned Cardinal Paparo to go to Ireland and establish four ecclesiastical provinces, appointing to each a metropolitan. At the general synod of Kells in 1152, the metropolitan provinces of Armagh, Dublin, Cashel, and Tuam, were created which were roughly co-extensive with their contemporary civil counterparts.

In a document drawn up by the Archbishop of Tuam in 1214, the cardinal is described as finding both a bishop based in Dublin (who exercised his episcopal office within the city walls only, a very small area) and "He found in the same Diocese another church in the mountains, which likewise had the name of a city [Glendalough] and had a certain chorepiscopus. But he delivered the pallium to Dublin which was the best city and appointed that the diocese (Glendalough) in which both these cities were should be divided, and that one part thereof should fall to the metropolitan." The part of northern County Dublin known as Fingall was taken from Glendalough Diocese and attached to Dublin. The new archdiocese had 40 parishes grouped in deaneries that were based on the old senior monasteries. All dependence by Dublin upon English churches, such as Canterbury, ended.

=== Early archbishops ===
The founding Archbishop – Gregory – was consecrated at Lambeth. His suffragan sees were Kildare, Ossory, Leighlin, Ferns and Glendalough. The second archbishop, from 1161 to 1179, was Saint Lorcán O'Toole, previously Abbot of Glendalough, who had been elected as Bishop of Glendalough in 1162. During his time in office, the presence of the Church grew in Dublin city (by 1170 there were six churches other than the cathedral within the walls) and religious orders from the continent came to Ireland (Augustinians, Dominicans, Franciscans and Carmelites had houses in Dublin, and the great convent of Grace Dieu, near Donabate, was also founded). As part of this trend, Lorcán installed a community of canons to minister according to the Aroasian (reformed Augustinian) Rule in the Cathedral of the Holy Trinity (later known as Christ Church). The Abbey of Saint Mary, one of the most important religious houses in Ireland for centuries, was founded in Dublin at that time, first under the Benedictine Rule, then passing to the Cistercians.

=== Norman period ===
Ireland's political scene was changed permanently by the coming of the Normans and the influence of the English Crown. Saint Lorcán's successor was a Norman, and from then onward to the time of the Reformation, Dublin's archbishops were all either Norman or English. In 1185, the Pope had granted a petition to merge the Dioceses of Dublin and Glendalough, to take effect on the death of the Bishop of Glendalough. The union took effect in 1216, with the approval of Pope Innocent III, and the dioceses have remained merged ever since.

Dublin acquired a second cathedral, St Patrick's, built outside the city walls by an archbishop anxious to keep his freedom of action from the city's government, and chartered in 1191. In addition to his palace of Saint Sepulchre (where Kevin Street Garda station is situated today) the archbishop had his castle at Swords. The abbot of Saint Mary's Abbey had his castle at Bulloch Harbour near Dalkey, where he levied customs duties on all imported goods. At that time, Dalkey was a busy commercial port.

Medieval parish churches can be traced outside the city and towns. Tully, which dated from very ancient times, Kilgobbin, Kill of the Grange, Kilbarrack, Raheny, Howth, Grange Abbey, are examples. Their ruined walls seem small to modern eyes, but population was sparse in those days and simple buildings were adequate, many roofed with thatch.

Medieval times also saw many pilgrimages and in addition to Glendalough, pilgrimages were made regularly to Our Lady's Shrine at Trim in County Meath, and overseas, for example to Rome, and to the great shrine of Saint James, at Compostela in Spain, assembling at Saint James' Church and leaving the city by Saint James' Gate, as was the custom in other European cities as well.

=== Reformation period ===
Archbishop Alen was murdered in 1534 during the rebellion of "Silken Thomas". The excommunication of Henry VIII occurred in 1538 and Henry was proclaimed King of Ireland by the Irish Parliament in 1542. No archbishop was nominated by Rome until Hugh Curwen in 1555, under Queen Mary. Due to the uneven process of the English Reformation, the final separation between the Papacy and the English administration did not take place until 1570 with the publication of in Pope Pius V's papal bull Regnans in Excelsis. The sectarian Penal Laws subsequently enacted led to long periods of persecution and deprivation for the church throughout the two Kingdoms. In Ireland, the churches and other property passed to the state church, priests were driven into hiding, and restrictions on aspects of ordinary life were imposed on for those who remained Roman Catholics.

Dublin religious martyrs included Blessed Francis Taylor, Mayor of Dublin, and Blessed Margaret Bermingham – Mrs. Ball – and Archbishop Peter Talbot, who was a contemporary of Saint Oliver Plunkett. Martyrs outside Dublin included Blessed Dermot O'Hurley, Archbishop of Cashel who is buried in the churchyard of Saint Kevin's, off Camden Street, Blessed Conor O'Devany of the Diocese of Down and Connor, and Blessed Patrick O'Loughran, a priest of County Tyrone.

As persecution eased in the latter eighteenth century, Mass houses were opened. Some are marked on maps and the memory of "Mass paths" in certain country places has lasted until today. The buildings were usually of very simple design, of mud walls and thatch roofs, with the most primitive of furnishings, and similar tales were repeated all over Ireland – as the saying went "The King born in a stable held court in a shack."

=== 18th and 19th centuries ===
The eighteenth and nineteenth centuries were a time of reconstruction and revival, as the Penal Laws were gradually relaxed. In the 1770s and 1780s Archbishop Carpenter issued instructions about prayers to be said in the diocese in Irish and English, both languages being in common use among ordinary people. The 1800s saw the great work of the new religious congregations, such as the Sisters of Charity under Mary Aikenhead, Catherine McAuley with her House of Mercy in Baggot Street, and Margaret Aylward with the Holy Faith Sisters, Blessed Edmund Rice from Waterford, with O'Connell Schools in Richmond Street and the School in Hannover Street which later moved to Westland Row.

Daniel O'Connell was the leader of many initiatives to regain Catholic freedom of worship. In these years Archbishop Daniel Murray oversaw the ongoing work of renewal.

Dr. Murray played a special role when the Loreto Sisters, the Irish branch of the Institute of the Blessed Virgin Mary, was founded by his devoted friend Mother Frances ("Fanny") Ball, as a name associated with so much suffering for the Faith came back three centuries later to rejoice in its restoring.

The restoration of Catholic education led to missionary work, the Jesuits at the Catholic University and at Milltown Park, the Holy Ghost Fathers at Kimmage Manor and Blackrock must be remembered among many others.

=== Modern times ===
Since the 1950s, an increase of population to more than a million adherents doubled the number of parishes to the present total of 200. In all parishes, lay men and women are being trained to take an increased role in the running of Church affairs in future years.

== Governance ==
The archdiocese is led by

- the archbishop, assisted by two (as at 2024) auxiliary bishops, each with a titular see
- the vicar-general
- two episcopal vicars
- a vicar for priests
- a vicar for religious (in 2007, a nun)
- other senior clerics.

Additionally, there is a Council of Priests, various consultative committees and each Deanery has a Vicar Forane.

=== The Chapter ===
The Metropolitan Chapter still exists. While the Church of Ireland had two Chapters for many years, the Roman Church has only one, descended from that of St. Patrick's Cathedral, as Christ Church was reconstituted without papal authority, in 1539–1541. The members of the Chapter today have a ceremonial and advisory role.

There are places for 32 Canons, comprising 4 dignities, 2 archdeacons, and 26 prebendaries for 24 prebends (the two lowest-ranked have two parts each).

=== Administration ===
The Diocesan administration, based at Archbishop's House and adjacent buildings at Clonliffe College, includes the Chancellery, the Offices for Priests, Religious and Human Resources, the Finance and Education Secretariats, Offices of Communication and Public Affairs and Diocesan Archives. There are also developmental and liturgical support groups such as the Vocations team and Liturgical Resource Centre, and initiatives for continued development of priests and parishes. Finally, there are ecclesiastical panels such as the Marriage Tribunal.

The parishes are clustered into the following Deaneries: Blessington, Bray, Cullenswood, Donnybrook, Dún Laoghaire, Fingal North, Fingal South East, Fingal South West, Finglas, Howth, Maynooth, North City Centre, South City Centre, South Dublin, Tallaght, Wicklow.

A Parish Pastoral Council and a Parish Finance Committee have been established in each parish.

=== Priesthood ===
The archdiocese is served by around 700 priests, about one quarter of whom are "on loan" from religious orders (along with a few from the Archdiocese of Cashel). Most priests minister in parishes, with a small number involved in administrative roles or serving on special diocesan projects. The table below enumerates priestly ordinations in recent years.

From 1990 to 2006
Year	Number Ordained
2006	3
2005	0
2004	1
2003	5
2002	2
2001	1
2000	2
1999	1
1998	3
1997	2
1996	6
1995	4
1994	7
1993	4
1992	8
1991	6
1990	5

A further 8 ordinations were expected in 2007 from a student cohort totalling 67.

== Other services ==
The archdiocese, in addition to the work within the 200 or so parishes, operates some services centrally. Among these are Crosscare (the Diocesan Agency for social care) and the Catholic Youth Care (CYC). Crosscare runs food programmes for the under privileged, a drugs awareness programme, homeless services, and support for migrants.

The diocese is also home to a branch of Accord, the national Catholic Marriage Care Agency.

There is also the independent child protection service.

== See also ==
- Archbishop of Dublin, which lists of the pre- and post-Reformation archbishops
- Sexual abuse scandal in the Catholic archdiocese of Dublin – that caused the Irish government to publish the 2009 Murphy Report.
