= Coolock feud =

Allegedly connected murders in Dublin in 2019

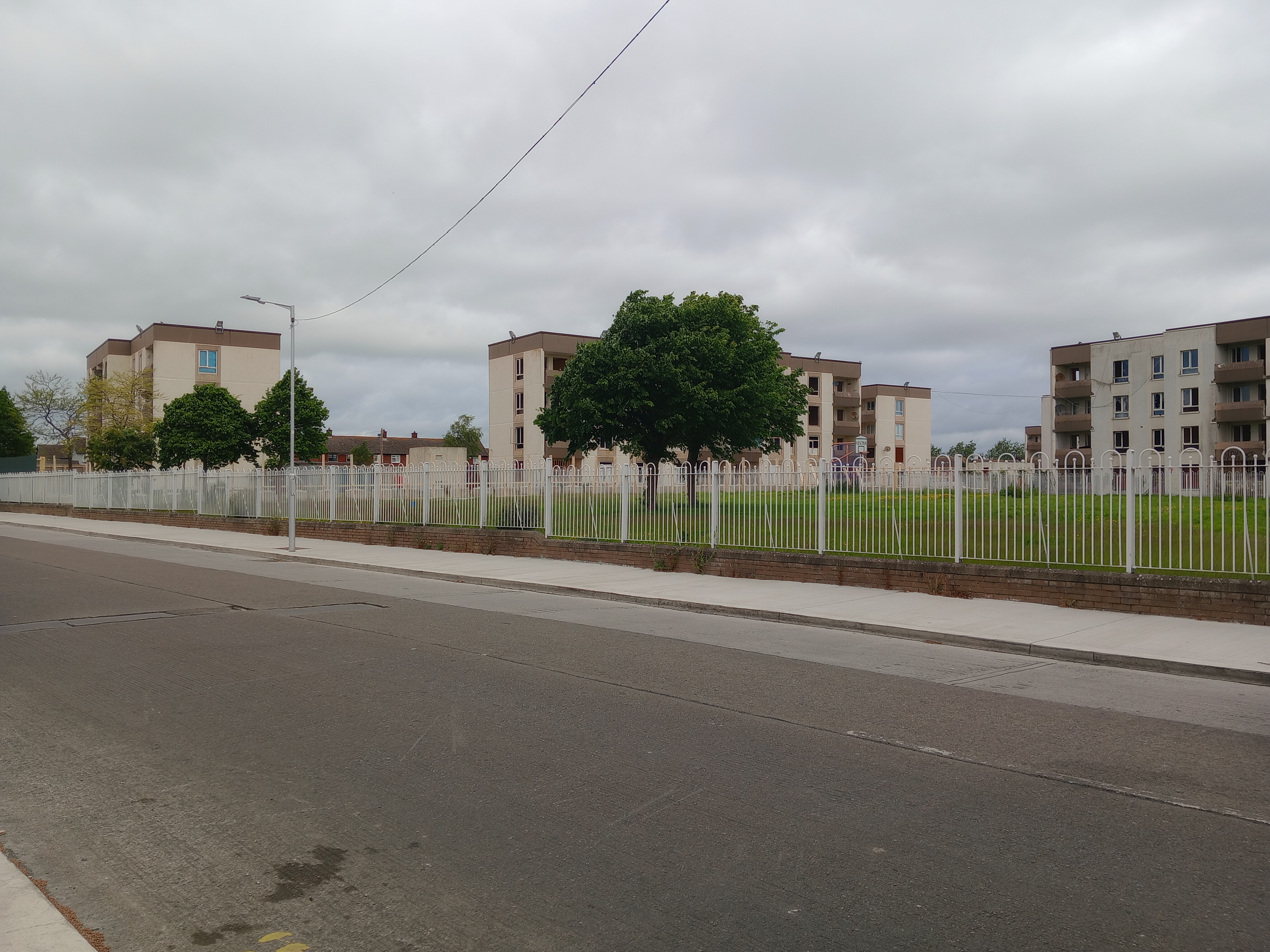
Date	2019 -2020
Location	Coolock

Belligerents
- Internal conflicts within Kinahan sindicate ( Finglas - Gucci gang and others )

The Coolock feud was a series of allegedly connected murders that happened in the Coolock area of Dublin in 2019.

== Murder of Zach Parker ==
Zach Parker was shot dead on 17 January 2019 outside a gym in Applewood Close in Swords. He was driving out of a car park when a gunman shot him and his passenger. Parker, 23, died at the scene and his 25-year-old passenger was taken to Beaumont Hospital. He had been convicted of drug dealing after being caught with almost €3,000 worth of cocaine in February 2017. Gardaí suggested that the shooting was related with local drug dealing. Gardaí believed that Parker owed money to a group known as the Gucci gang, a subset of the Kinahan gang, based in Finglas. Gardaí believed that Parker had secured a relatively small amount of drugs on credit from the gang which were later seized by Gardaí. One avenue of investigation was that he was killed because he wasn't able to pay back his debts to the gang.

== Murder of Seán Little ==
Seán Little was shot dead on 21 May 2019 and his body was found beside a burning Opel Insignia at Rowan's Little, near Walshestown, near junction 5 of the M1. He was 22, associated with the leader of a Finglas-based gang and allegedly had close links to Dublin members of the Kinahan gang. Gardaí believed that Little was killed because he wanted revenge for the murder of his friend Zach Parker.

== Murder of Jordan Davis ==
Jordan Davis was shot dead on 22 May 2019 in a laneway off Marigold Road, Darndale. He was bringing his four month old son for a walk in a buggy when he was shot. He was also friends with Seán Little. In June 2019, a man was arrested in connection with his murder and charged. Several people were subsequently jailed for the murder.

== Murder of Hamid Sanambar ==
Hamid Sanambar, aged 41, was shot dead at the home of his friend Seán Little on Kilbarron Avenue in Coolock. He was a known associate of several crime gangs, including the Kinahans. Gardaí were investigating several lines of inquiry, including whether the murder was a form of retaliation by another gang or if Sanambar was set up by his own associates.

== Murder of Eoin Boylan ==
Eoin Boylan was shot dead on 24 November 2019 in the garden of his home on Clonsaugh Avenue, Coolock, around 5:15pm. He had been formally warned by Gardaí that his life was in danger and he was advised to leave the area for safety. He had survived previous attempts on his life. Gardaí are investigating if comments he may have made about Littles' murder on social media are connected.

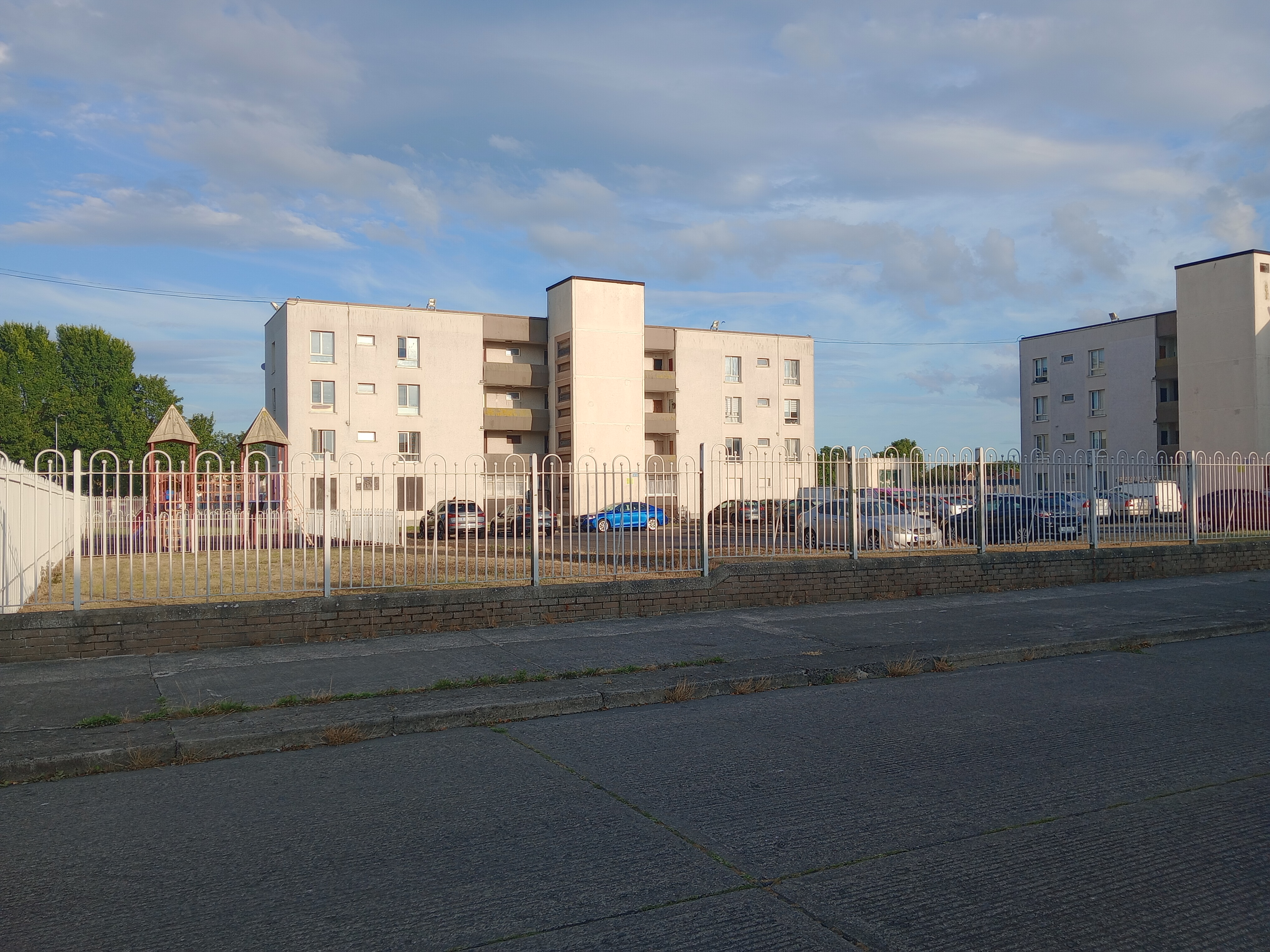
The Cromcastle Court flats in August 2026

== May 2020 shooting ==
An unnamed man in his 30s was shot on 20 May 2020 on Cromcastle Drive in Coolock. The man was shot around 2pm outside a house, receiving leg wounds. Gardaí and paramedics attended to him before being taken to Beaumount Hospital a kilometre away. The target, who is from Cromcastle Estate, had a long history of involvement with crime. While Gardaí did not confirm if the attack was related to the Coolock feud, the shooting happened 300m from where Hamid Sanambar was killed on Kilbarron Avenue.

== Arrest and conviction of Stephen Little and Edward McDonnell ==
On 14 September 2019, Gardaí stopped and arrested Stephen Little, 47, of Kilmore and Edward McDonnell of New Ross, County Wexford. The Gardaí found they had a semi-automatic pistol, two balaclavas, two baseball bats, gloves, mobile phones, a can of petrol and a long-handled lighter. They were taken to Clontarf Garda station. Little told Gardaí after his arrest "had you given me another hour, I would have killed the bastard that killed him" and also "I lost my marriage and my son". Both men had been under surveillance by the Drugs and Organised Crime Bureau.

The men were tried in the non-jury Special Criminal Court. Stephen Little pleaded guilty to unlawful possession of a Grand Power G9 semi-automatic pistol. The court was told that if Little had not made the comment to Gardaí about being given another hour, the case against him would have been weaker and he may not have been charged. Edward McDonnell initially pleaded not guilty, but on the fifth day of the trial changed his plea to guilty to the same charge. Both men were jailed for possession of a firearm under suspicious circumstances, an offence under section Section 27A (1) of the Firearms Act. McDonnell had 47 previous convictions, including attempted robbery, sexual assault and assault causing harm. The judge said that the men were involved in serious and organised crime and that the "timely intervention" of Gardaí had prevented serious harm or death. Little was sentenced to six years imprisonment, McDonnell to nine.
