= Kilmore =

Kilmore may refer to:

== Places ==
=== Australia ===
- Electoral district of Kilmore, Victoria
- Kilmore, Victoria, Australia, a town
- Shire of Kilmore, a local government area north of Melbourne

=== Ireland ===
- Kilmore, County Cavan, a parish
- Kilmore, County Wexford, a village
- Kilmore, Dublin, a suburb
- Kilmore Quay, County Wexford, a fishing village

=== Northern Ireland ===
- Kilmore, County Antrim, a townland in County Antrim
- Kilmore, County Armagh, a village and townland in County Armagh
- Kilmore, County Down, a village, parish and townland

=== Other places ===
- Kilmore, Skye, Scotland
- Kilmore, Indiana, United States

== People ==
- Chris Kilmore (born 1973), American musician and DJ
- Kevin Kilmore (born 1959), English footballer

== Other uses ==
- Bishop of Kilmore
- Diocese of Kilmore (disambiguation)
- Kilmore (racehorse)

== See also ==
- Kilmore East, Victoria, Australia
- Kilmore West, Dublin, Ireland
