= John Charles McQuaid =

Catholic Primate of Ireland (1895–1973)

The Most Reverend John Charles McQuaid C.S.Sp.
- Archbishop of Dublin; Primate of Ireland
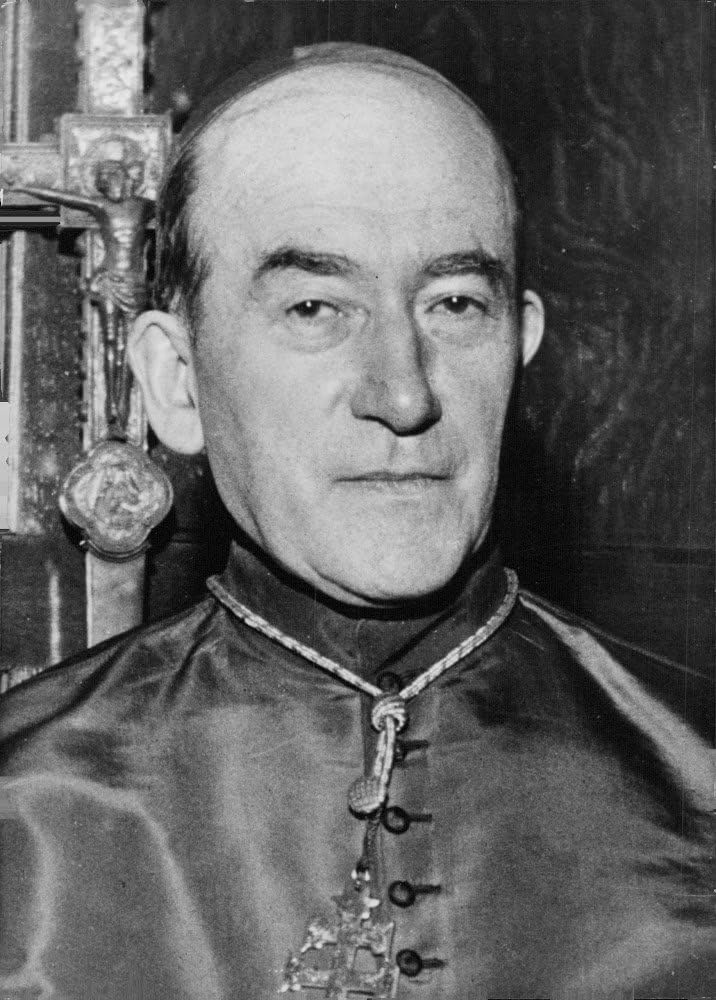
- McQuaid, c. 1950
- Church: Catholic
- See: Dublin
- In office: 1940–1972
- Predecessor: Edward Joseph Byrne
- Successor: Dermot J. Ryan
- Previous post: Teacher

Orders
- Ordination: 29 June 1924
- Consecration: 27 December 1940

Personal details
- Born: 28 July 1895 Cootehill, County Cavan, Ireland
- Died: 7 April 1973 (aged 77) Loughlinstown, County Dublin, Ireland

John Charles McQuaid, C.S.Sp. (28 July 1895 – 7 April 1973), was a Roman Catholic priest and prelate who served as Archbishop of Dublin from 1940 until his resignation in 1972. Born in Cootehill, County Cavan, he was educated at Blackrock College and Clongowes Wood College before entering the Congregation of the Holy Spirit at Kimmage in 1913. He graduated from University College Dublin with first-class honours in Ancient Classics and was awarded a doctorate in theology at the Gregorian University in Rome. Ordained in 1924, he went on to serve as dean of studies and later president of Blackrock College from 1925 to 1939, during which time he established a close friendship with Éamon de Valera and played a significant, if contested, role in the drafting of the Constitution of Ireland in 1937.

Appointed Archbishop of Dublin on 6 November 1940 at the age of 45, McQuaid oversaw a period of enormous expansion in the Catholic Church in the diocese. During his episcopate, the Catholic population of Dublin grew from approximately 630,000 to over 800,000, more than sixty new parishes were established, and hundreds of new churches, primary schools and secondary schools were built. He founded the Catholic Social Service Conference and the Catholic Social Welfare Bureau in his first two years in office, and initiated a wide network of charitable and social services for the poor of the city. His private generosity was widely noted, as was his care for Irish emigrants, on whose behalf he lobbied successive governments at a time when the state paid little attention to the needs of the diaspora.

McQuaid was a dominant and often controversial figure in Irish public life throughout his tenure. A staunch conservative and committed anti-communist, he clashed repeatedly with the state over health and social policy, most notably during the Mother and Child Scheme controversy of 1950-1951, which became the most serious church-state confrontation since the foundation of the state. He extended the ban on Catholics attending Trinity College Dublin, discouraged inter-denominational dialogue, and used his considerable influence to shape Irish cultural and social life, including the effective closure of theatrical productions of which he disapproved. His relations with de Valera, once warm, grew strained over the course of the 1950s, and his failure to be elevated to the cardinalate was attributed in part to lobbying against him by successive Irish governments at the Vatican.

The Second Vatican Council, convened in 1962, marked the beginning of McQuaid's decline as a force in Irish Catholic life. He was slow to implement its reforms and was perceived by many as an obstacle to renewal within the Church. Serious criticism of his personality and policies appeared in the theological journal Herder Correspondence in 1965-1966, and the publication of the papal encyclical on birth control in 1968 provoked open dissent in his diocese that he was powerless to contain. In 1970, having turned 75, he submitted his resignation to the Vatican; its acceptance was announced on 4 January 1972. He died fifteen months later on 7 April 1973.

== Early life and education ==
John Charles McQuaid was born on 28 July 1895 in Cootehill, County Cavan, the second child and only son of Dr Eugene McQuaid and his wife Jane (née Corry), who had married in 1893. Jane McQuaid died within a month of her son's birth; her widower remarried the following year. By his second wife, Agnes (née Mayne), Eugene McQuaid had four more children. Eugene McQuaid served as assistant medical officer for the district and registrar of births, deaths and marriages. There was a strong medical tradition in the family: Eugene's brother was a doctor, his daughter Helen became a doctor, and so did one of his sons by his second marriage. John Charles was raised by his stepmother, and it was not until his teenage years that he learned his biological mother had died.

McQuaid first attended Cootehill National School, before going on to St. Patrick's College in Cavan Town, then Blackrock College in Dublin, run by the Holy Ghost Fathers, and later Clongowes Wood College in County Kildare, where one of his teachers was Joseph Walshe, later the first and long-serving secretary of the Department of External Affairs. In 1913, McQuaid entered the Holy Ghost noviciate at Kimmage Manor in Dublin and was professed in 1914. While at Kimmage Manor, he studied at University College Dublin, graduating in 1917 with first-class honours in Ancient Classics. The following year, he was awarded a first-class honours MA, with a thesis entitled "Life and Philosophy of Seneca", and also studied for the Higher Diploma in Education. He then went to Rome, where he took a doctorate in theology at the Gregorian University. He was ordained a priest on 29 June 1924 and had begun further postgraduate studies in oriental languages when he was recalled to Blackrock College in November 1925.

== Dean and President of Blackrock College, 1925–1939 ==
In November 1925, McQuaid was appointed dean of studies at Blackrock College, a post he held until 1931, when he became president of the college, a role he held until 1939. He was also elected chairman of the Catholic Headmasters' Association and remained in that post until 1940.

He was a popular teacher at Blackrock, with a reputation for being "strict but fair". His classes were long remembered by former pupils, in whom McQuaid sought to instil not only his love of classics and the English language but also an understanding of the visual arts. With senior students, he combined the teaching of film appreciation with English literature. He took a keen interest in literature, music, drama, film, and art, and even before becoming archbishop, he was a patron of the stained-glass artists Michael Healy, Evie Hone, and Mainie Jellett; Healy designed two windows for the Blackrock College chapel. When McQuaid was consulted about commissioning an artist to replace the stained-glass windows at Eton College, he recommended Hone, which led to one of her finest works.

=== International Eucharistic Congress 1932 ===
The 31st International Eucharistic Congress was held in Dublin over five days in June 1932. This was a major gathering, involving many people and events that included a large garden party organised by McQuaid in the grounds of Blackrock College, attended by many clerics and laypeople. Among the attendees were James McNeill and Éamon de Valera, which demonstrated McQuaid's courtesy and diplomacy to considerable political effect. Historian Dermot Keogh says that:

He had taken expert care of an awkward piece of protocol for de Valera. The governor general, James McNeill, and the government ministers were in a state of war. De Valera was attempting to abolish the office. Neither side could afford to meet for fear of a public incident. McQuaid saw that both 'factions' were introduced independently to the papal nuncio at the garden party in Castle Dawson.

However, in a breach of protocol, McNeill, who was the Governor-General of the Irish Free State, was not invited to the lavish state reception in Dublin Castle later that day to welcome the Papal Legate. Given such treatment, it was hardly surprising that the situation came to a head later in 1932. King George V engineered a compromise, whereby de Valera withdrew his dismissal request and McNeill, who was due to retire at the end of 1932, would push forward his retirement date by a month or so. McNeill, at the King's request, resigned on 1 November 1932.

=== Involvement in drafting the 1937 Constitution ===
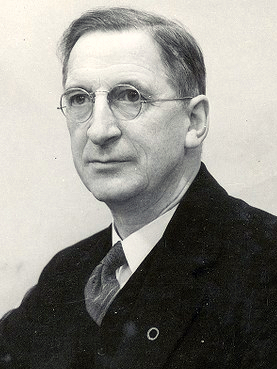
Éamon de Valera, circa 1939

McQuaid's personal relationship with Éamon de Valera allowed him significant input into the drafting of the 1937 constitution of Ireland. McQuaid's friendship with de Valera developed naturally from their shared connection to Blackrock College. De Valera was a past pupil with a strong attachment to the college; his sons attended the school, and the family lived nearby. As president of Blackrock College from 1931, McQuaid became a regular guest at the de Valera household, and a close friendship with both Éamon and his wife Sinéad followed. McQuaid was particularly attentive to the family at the time of the death of de Valera's brother Brian in a riding accident in February 1936, when he was a frequent visitor to the de Valera home. It was from within this relationship that McQuaid's involvement in the drafting of Bunreacht na hÉireann grew.

From early 1937, McQuaid supplied de Valera with extensive documentation on papal encyclicals, philosophy, theology, theories of authority, the family, marriage, Catholic social principles, private property and church-state relations. As the drafting process progressed, his involvement became more direct, and he participated in the actual formulation of articles dealing with personal rights, the family, education, private property, religion and the directive principles of social policy (Articles 40-45 in the final draft). His proposed religious clause, however, which would have declared the Catholic Church to be the "one true church", was rejected by de Valera and his team of officials, much to McQuaid's disappointment. The constitution as adopted in July 1937 instead acknowledged the "special position" of the Catholic Church "as the guardian of the Faith professed by the great majority of the citizens", while also forbidding any established state church and guaranteeing freedom of religion.

The precise extent of McQuaid's contribution has been a matter of some scholarly controversy. John Cooney's biography describes him as "one of the great architects of the Constitution, albeit in the shadows" and devotes a chapter to him as "co-maker of the constitution". Historian Dermot Keogh has challenged this framing, arguing that it overstates McQuaid's role and misrepresents the complexity of the drafting process. Keogh maintains that if any single author of the 1937 constitution is to be identified, it must be John Hearne, the legal officer in the Department of External Affairs, with Maurice Moynihan also playing a significant role. In Keogh's assessment, McQuaid "played an important role in the whole process", but the designation of "co-maker" is "simply not defensible".

== Appointment as Archbishop ==
McQuaid was appointed Archbishop of Dublin on 6 November 1940, at the age of 45, making him one of the youngest members of the hierarchy. The appointment of a priest from the ranks of the regular clergy occasioned considerable surprise; it was the first such appointment since the Dominican archbishop John Troy (1739-1823). de Valera and the secretary of the Department of External Affairs, Joseph Walshe, had pressed McQuaid's candidacy on the Vatican, though it is doubtful whether the Vatican required much persuasion: McQuaid's formidable administrative abilities had already come to the attention of the Irish nuncio, Paschal Robinson. The previous incumbent, Dr Edward Joseph Byrne, had been ill for a long time, and the administration of the diocese had run down. McQuaid had also been mentioned as a potential candidate for his native diocese of Kilmore. The appointment came at a more settled moment in Irish public life, following the turbulence of the Blueshirts, the IRA and the Economic War with Britain during the 1930s. The onset of the Emergency had produced a new mode of national consensus. De Valera later said he had been impressed by McQuaid's social concerns at a time when wartime hardships were bearing most heavily on the poor, noting that McQuaid stood apart from a hierarchy and clergy who largely reflected the outlook of the strong farming class and were, in his view, uncomprehending of urban poverty. This outlook was evident in McQuaid's first Lenten pastoral of 1941, in which he wrote that "the very widespread yearning for social peace is itself proof of the grave need of social reform", though he emphasised that lasting reconstruction could only be built on Catholic faith.

== Archbishop of Dublin, 1940–1971 ==
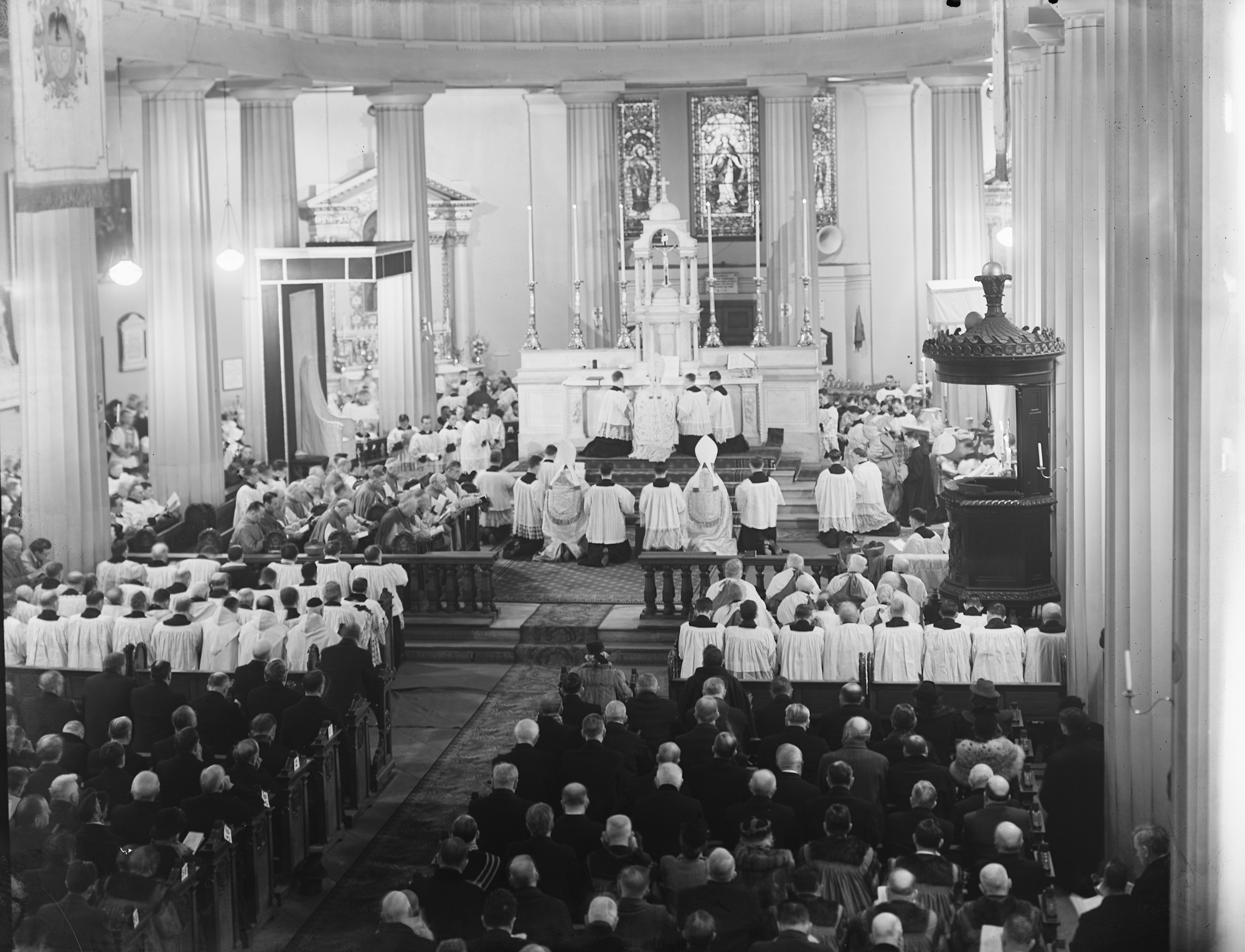
McQuaid's consecration at St. Mary's Pro Cathedral

McQuaid took up his appointment as Archbishop of Dublin with characteristic energy, immediately embarking on a thorough overhaul of diocesan administration. The Irish Times obituary of 9 April 1973 noted that he possessed "the great administrator's innovating gifts" and "did not wait for problems to hit him, but sought them out and anticipated them". Within his first two years in office, he had established the Catholic Social Service Conference (1941) to coordinate the work of the many charitable organisations in the city, and the Catholic Social Welfare Bureau (1942) to assist the thousands of emigrants travelling to Britain for wartime work. In 1943, the government appointed him chairman of the youth unemployment commission. He gave financial assistance to victims of air raids in Dublin and actively promoted better care for tuberculosis patients, the elderly, the physically and intellectually disabled, and sick children. One of his most cherished projects, in which he had been involved since the 1930s, was Our Lady's Hospital for Sick Children in Crumlin, which finally opened in 1956. In 1961, he founded the Colleges' Volunteer Corps, drawn from Roman Catholic secondary colleges in Dublin, to carry out social work.

Over the course of his episcopate, the Catholic population of Dublin grew from approximately 630,000 to over 800,000. The number of diocesan clergy rose from 370 to 600, and religious from 500 to 800. More than sixty new parishes were established, bringing the total to 131 by 1972, along with over 80 new churches, 250 new primary schools and 100 new secondary schools, the latter sector more than doubling in number between 1946 and 1966. McQuaid purchased the gardens at the centre of Merrion Square with the intention of building a Catholic cathedral, but felt obliged to redirect those funds towards the new churches and schools instead. As a result, St Mary's Pro-Cathedral on Marlborough Street remained the de facto centre of the archdiocese. In the 1950s McQuaid acquired Notre Dame de Bois, a Victorian neo-Gothic mansion in Killiney, which became his principal residence in preference to the official episcopal palace at Archbishop's House, Drumcondra.

McQuaid's tenure brought him into recurring conflict with the state over questions of health and social policy, most notably during the Mother and Child Scheme controversy of 1950-1951, which became the most serious church-state confrontation since the founding of the state. He also extended the existing ban on Catholics attending Trinity College Dublin without special dispensation, a position maintained until the general prohibition was lifted by the bishops at Maynooth in June 1970. He also took an active interest in industrial relations, most notably during the national teachers' strike of 1946, in which he expressed public sympathy with the strikers' cause.

The final decade of McQuaid's career was marked by increasing isolation and a growing disconnect between his vision of Catholic Ireland and the rapidly changing society around him. The Second Vatican Council, convened by Pope John XXIII in 1962, introduced sweeping changes in liturgy, lay participation and ecumenism that McQuaid was slow to embrace; in an explanatory pastoral, What is a General Council? (1963), he made clear he saw little need for the council's reforms, writing revealingly that councils "are not essential to the nature of the church". He also criticised what he considered to be "facile ignorance" in reporting of the Council's events by Irish journalists, and their still "more facile dictation in regards to what we bishops must do now". He attempted to reassure his congregation that none of the changes would impact on the "tranquillity" of their lives.

The Patrician Year of 1961 is widely regarded as the high point of his episcopate, and the years that followed saw his authority steadily eroded. Serious criticism of his personality and policies appeared in the theological journal Herder Correspondence in 1965-1966, and members of his clergy who expressed disagreement increasingly found their advancement blocked or themselves dispatched to outlying parishes. The publication of the papal encyclical on birth control in 1968 provoked open rebellion in the diocese, drawing from McQuaid his last pastoral, Contraception and Conscience (1971), whose tone betrayed his anger and frustration at the direction of Irish Catholic life. By this point, both the Church and Irish society had been transformed in ways that, in the words of one account, "disturbed and baffled him". Writer Mary Kenny has noted that McQuaid never received the cardinalate, suggesting this was "probably stymied by negative lobbying by the Irish government" at the Vatican. In 1970, having turned 75, McQuaid submitted his resignation to the Vatican, apparently not anticipating that it would be accepted. Its acceptance was announced on 4 January 1972. McQuaid was very upset that the Pope accepted this, albeit with a year's extension. Francis Xavier Carty writes, "He was possibly worried that the Pope's rapid acceptance of his resignation was a negative judgement on his work". Dermot Ryan would go on to succeed McQuaid as Archbishop of Dublin. .

== Social and political stances ==
McQuaid was a socially and theologically conservative Catholic prelate who sought to maintain the Church's primacy in Irish public life against what he regarded as the encroachments of an increasingly interventionist state. Journalist Mary Kenny has described him as "a grim authoritarian and autocrat who sought to fashion Ireland as a theocratic state". Thomas Christopher Garvin wrote "McQuaid was an odd mixture of the progressive, the reactionary, the creative and the authoritarian." McQuaid was a committed anti-communist who used his influence to counter the spread of left-wing politics both in Ireland and across Europe. His social philosophy drew heavily on Catholic social teaching and papal encyclicals, and he was broadly hostile to state-administered welfare and health schemes, which he feared could be used to undermine Church authority and introduce practices contrary to Catholic moral teaching. He supported widening access to free secondary-schooling when this was rejected by the state-nominated Council of Education. In the late 1940s McQuaid forced Catholic Hospitals in Dublin to treat sufferers of sexually-transmitted-diseases "that many Catholics tried to pretend did not exist, or alternatively, if they were recognised as existing, were to be regarded as the (very just) wages of sin." His worldview was shaped in part by the tradition of right-wing French Catholic thought, and he was suspicious of Liberalism, Protestantism and Judaism in ways that placed him firmly on the conservative and authoritarian wing of the mid-twentieth-century Catholic hierarchy.

McQuaid's long tenure as Archbishop placed him at the centre of many of the major political and social controversies of mid-twentieth century Ireland. While his friendship with Éamon de Valera had been the foundation of much of his influence, the two men's relationship grew strained over time. According to historian Dermot Keogh, while de Valera put the interests of the state first, McQuaid consistently promoted those of the Church. By 1952, the relationship had cooled to the point where McQuaid wrote to the Apostolic Nuncio to complain that de Valera's return to power had introduced "a policy of distance" and "a failure to consult any Bishop." McQuaid's failure to be elevated to the cardinalate was due in part to lobbying against him at the Vatican by successive Irish governments.

=== National Teachers' Strike, 1946 ===
The seven-month strike by the Irish National Teachers Organisation in 1946 placed McQuaid in direct conflict with the government. Primary school teachers sought a wage increase and parity with their secondary school colleagues. McQuaid expressed public sympathy with the strikers' case, which greatly annoyed de Valera, who was Taoiseach at the time and unwilling to meet their pay demands given severe financial constraints. McQuaid eventually recognised that his support for the teachers would not overcome de Valera's opposition and persuaded them to end their strike.

=== Mother and Child Scheme, 1950–1951 ===
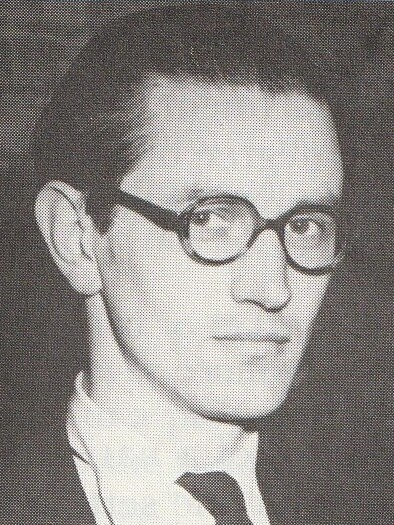
McQuaid's opposition to the policy of Dr Noel Browne came to define the politics of post-WW2 Ireland

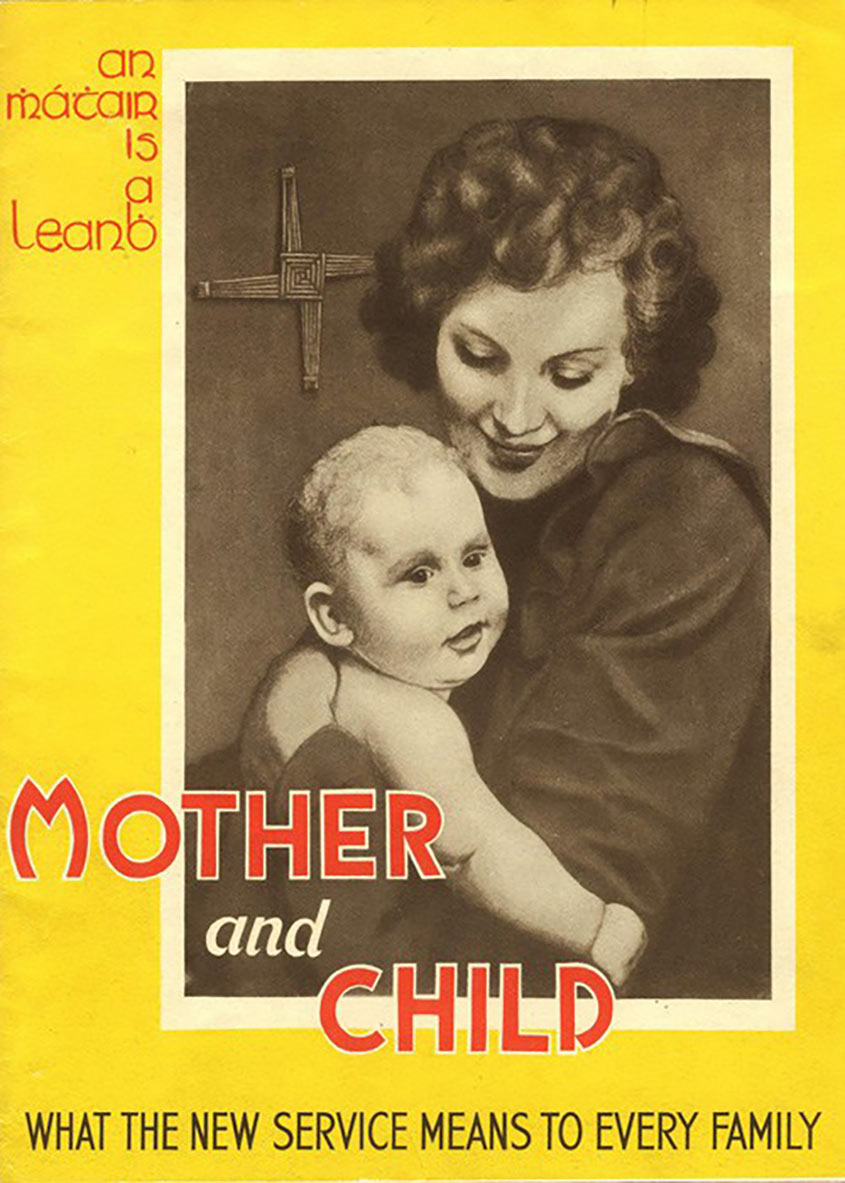
The cover of a booklet promoting the Mother and Child scheme, circa 1947

The most serious church-state controversy of McQuaid's episcopate arose from the proposed Mother and Child Scheme of the First Inter-Party Government. Minister for Health Noel Browne, alarmed by the absence of ante-natal care for pregnant women and the consequent infant mortality rates, pursued the provision of free access to healthcare for mothers and children under 16. McQuaid strongly criticised the scheme, claiming it contravened the moral teaching of the Catholic Church. The hierarchy feared that contraception and abortion would be introduced under the cover of state health services, and also had a stake in the Church's control of the voluntary hospitals. McQuaid's opposition, exercised through his considerable personal influence, contributed to the government's withdrawal of the scheme and to Browne's resignation in April 1951. The controversy deepened when Browne passed correspondence between the archbishop's house and his department to the editor of the Irish Times, R. M. "Bertie" Smyllie, revealing to the public the extent of clerical influence over government decision-making. According to historian Deirdre McMahon, although McQuaid attracted most of the criticism directed at the hierarchy over the affair, other bishops, notably Michael Browne of Galway and Cornelius Lucey of Cork, had made equally forthright pronouncements on the limits of state power. When Fianna Fáil returned to office and introduced a revised health bill in 1953, McQuaid and the hierarchy attempted to repeat their tactics but were outmanoeuvred by de Valera and his Minister for Health, Dr James Ryan, and the bill passed with only cosmetic changes.

=== Anti-Communism ===
McQuaid was a vigorous opponent of Communism and used his influence to counter its spread both in Ireland and in Europe. He organised funds for post-war relief in several European countries, most notably Italy, and sent £20,000 to support the Christian Democrats ahead of the 1948 Italian general election. He also made a radio appeal for Italian relief funds in 1948, one of the very few occasions on which he made use of broadcasting. In the 1950s, with Yugoslavia governed by the League of Communists of Yugoslavia and Cardinal Aloysius Stepinac recently released from a Yugoslav prison, McQuaid persuaded the Football Association of Ireland to cancel a planned match between Yugoslavia and the Republic of Ireland in 1952. When a similar match was arranged for October 1955, his call for a boycott went unheeded and spectators filled Dalymount Park. He did, however, persuade radio broadcaster Philip Greene not to commentate the match, which produced the celebrated newspaper headline: "Reds turn Greene Yellow".

=== Views on Protestants and Trinity College ===
McQuaid was notably hostile to Protestant institutions and their perceived influence in Irish life. He extended the existing ban on Catholics attending Trinity College Dublin without special dispensation, becoming, according to one account, the first Irish bishop expressly to forbid Catholics from studying there, a position followed by the rest of the hierarchy. The general prohibition was not lifted until the bishops met at Maynooth in June 1970. Writer Mary Kenny has suggested that his hostility to Trinity's Anglican foundations may have been partly theological but was also rooted in his upbringing in the border county of Cavan, where sectarian tensions had deeper roots in history and land, and where Trinity's unionist associations were more keenly felt. McQuaid also discouraged the inter-denominational Mercier Society in the early 1940s, a decision that, according to one account, rankled for many years with Erskine Childers, later President of Ireland, and the distinguished civil servant Leon Ó Broin, both of whom had been actively involved in it.

=== Views on Judaism and Jews ===
In 1932, while still president of Blackrock College, McQuaid delivered a sermon in Cavan on Passion Sunday in which he made a series of antisemitic pronouncements, asserting that Jews had been engaged in persecution of Christ and his Church "from the first persecutions till the present moment," that the international press and Hollywood were controlled by what he termed the "Jew-enemy of our Saviour," and that the Great Depression was "the deliberate work of a few Jew financiers." In May 1949, McQuaid wrote to Chief Rabbi Immanuel Jakobovits threatening consequences for the Jewish community in Ireland if the new state of Israel did not address Christian places of worship there to his satisfaction. In his subsequent report to the Apostolic Nuncio, McQuaid described the morality of using as a weapon "that which most worries a Jew: the fear of reprisals." Journalist Mary Kenny has attributed his antisemitism in part to the influence of the French right-wing writer Charles Maurras. McQuaid also closed down an informal ecumenical dialogue group founded by Frank Duff of the Legion of Mary, in which Catholics, Protestants and Jews had been meeting to discuss questions of values and spirituality, and which had involved figures such as the writer Frank O'Connor and the noted obstetrician Bethel Solomons.

=== Communications, censorship and social control ===
McQuaid maintained an extensive network of informants drawn from professional and religious circles, including members of the Knights of Saint Columbanus, through which he monitored the conduct of clergy, journalists and public figures. He kept detailed files on employees of Telefís Éireann and, according to historian Diarmaid Ferriter, "had people in key places who fed him information". Although Ireland had no official theatre censorship, McQuaid effectively forced the closure of several productions simply by conveying his displeasure to theatre managements. In 1957 he succeeded in bringing down the curtain on Tennessee Williams's The Rose Tattoo at the Pike Theatre, and in 1959 he sent a priestly emissary to the Gaiety Theatre to convey his disapproval of J.P. Donleavy's The Ginger Man, whereupon the management closed the show. Paradoxically, McQuaid himself rarely made use of broadcasting, yet was instrumental in establishing the Catholic Communications Office and sent several priests to the United States for television training ahead of the opening of Telefís Éireann in 1961. In 1965, he established a diocesan press office. A secret internal Public Image Committee established by McQuaid at the end of 1963 reported that his public image was "entirely negative; a man who forbids, a man who is stern and aloof from the lives of the people." By the late 1960s, as Irish society changed rapidly and journalists grew more assertive, McQuaid found his influence increasingly constrained. When the director general of RTÉ, Kevin McCourt, acknowledged to him in February 1966 that he could not "be the policeman of all I want", the remark was equally applicable to McQuaid himself, according to Diarmaid Ferriter.

=== Views on Women ===
McQuaid held notably conservative views on the role of women in Irish society, shaped in part by what writer Mary Kenny has suggested was an idealised view of motherhood rooted in the early death of his own mother. He opposed the Mother and Child Scheme in part on the grounds that state intervention in maternal healthcare threatened the primacy of the family and the Church. He held disapproving views on women participating in athletics and attempted to prohibit the use of menstrual tampons, which he considered improper. He opposed legal adoption, believing it wrong to sever the link between an infant and its natural mother, and was instrumental in delaying the passage of adoption legislation until 1952, though this had the consequence of keeping more infants in institutional care. His 1945 foundation of Our Lady's Choral Society was notable for accepting women, unlike the Palestrina Choir at the Pro-Cathedral, though this represented one of the few areas in which he actively expanded a role for women in Church life. By the late 1960s, the growing assertiveness of women in Irish public life had become one of the clearest signs that his authority was eroding; when members of the Irish Women's Liberation Movement announced plans to protest at the laying of a foundation stone for a new church in his diocese, his defiant response was reported to have been "let them all come".

== Handling of allegations of abuse against clergy ==
In 2009, the Murphy Commission of Investigation produced its "Report into the Catholic Archdiocese of Dublin". The purpose of the commission was to probe the manner in which complaints of clerical abuse were handled.

A first complaint about Father James McNamee bathing with naked adolescent boys at Stella Maris F.C. was made in January 1960, investigated initially by Auxiliary Bishop Patrick Dunne and reported to McQuaid. McNamee denied the allegations and was believed by the bishops. McQuaid wrote: "as he is a worthy priest I agree that we could not refuse to accept his word." McNamee moved on from the club but, McQuaid said, not immediately "lest he be defamed." Many subsequent complaints were made about McNamee.

In August 1960, a British photographic processing company passed on film posted to them from Father Edmondus (a pseudonym for Father Paul McGennis) in Dublin to Scotland Yard. The photographs were of girls' private parts. It was passed to the Commissioner of the Garda Síochána, who asked McQuaid to take over the investigation. He in turn passed it to Bishop Dunne, who had grave concerns that a canonical crime had been committed. McGennis admitted to McQuaid that he had taken pictures of children at Crumlin Hospital, because of ignorance and curiosity regarding female sex organs. He related his social discomfiture with females as he was raised with brothers, though in fact he had a sister. McQuaid and Dunne finally agreed that a canonical crime had not been committed. McQuaid arranged for McGennis to see a doctor for instruction "to end his wonderment" at female genitalia. The Commission believed that "Archbishop McQuaid acted as he did to avoid scandal in both Ireland and Rome and without regard to the protection of children in Crumlin Hospital." It described his usage of the word "wonderment" to describe McGennis' actions as "risible." It further added, "The apparent cancellation by Archbishop McQuaid of his original plan to pursue the priest through the procedures of canon law was a disaster. It established a pattern of not holding abusers responsible which lasted for decades [...] no attempt was made to monitor Fr. Edmondus in other placements."

In 1961, McQuaid established a hostel in Dublin for boys who had been in industrial schools – mainly Artane – and assigned priests to see to their spiritual welfare and to help them integrate into society. One of these priests was Diarmuid Martin who went on to become Archbishop of Dublin in 2004 and to take a strong line against alleged clerical abusers. In June 2009, John Cooney wrote an article in the Irish Independent demanding to know why Martin had not denounced the alleged horrors of Artane 40 years previously. Patsy McGarry, Religious Affairs correspondent of The Irish Times, also wrote an article entitled "Archbishop Defends Abuse Inaction", in which Martin was quoted as saying:

Social workers, health boards and the diocese were trying to reform and eventually close down the institutions [...] Consensus soon emerged that the best – and indeed the only – option for Artane would be to close it down, which happened in 1969 [...] We did consistently hear stories of severe physical abuse and Dickensian conditions there [at industrial schools]. There was no mention of explicitly sexual abuse. The situation was referred by Archbishop McQuaid to the Department of Education.

== Personal life ==
Behind his formidable public exterior, McQuaid was, by most accounts, an extremely shy and reserved man who was ill at ease at social functions. Anglo-Irish novelist Elizabeth Bowen, who met him during the war years, described him as a man of intellect, courteous and diplomatic, with a genuinely European sensibility; he spoke French and Italian fluently. His dry humour was revealed only rarely, and he increasingly felt the isolation of his office as his episcopate lengthened. He tended to keep aloof from the rest of the hierarchy and, during the bishops' meetings at Maynooth, never stayed overnight at the college but travelled each day from Dublin. The gap between his private character and his public reputation was illustrated starkly in 1963, when, following the first session of the Second Vatican Council, he established a secret all-priests Public Image Committee to examine the Church's standing in the Dublin diocese. McQuaid insisted that members pull no punches, and they obliged, reporting that his public image was "entirely negative: a man who forbids, a man who is stern and aloof from the lives of the people, a man who doesn't meet the people (as they want him to) at church functions, at public gatherings, or television or in the streets, who writes deep pastoral letters in theological and canonical language that is remote from the lives of the people." One committee member noted that the archbishop was "somewhat disappointed" after the first meeting, feeling that discussion had centred too much on him personally rather than on the broader image of the Church.

=== Relationship with Patrick Kavanagh ===
One of the more unlikely aspects of McQuaid's personal life was his long friendship with the poet Patrick Kavanagh, whom he first met in 1940. McQuaid regularly gave Kavanagh money and in 1946 found him a position on the Catholic magazine The Standard, though the poet remained chronically disorganised and the archbishop continued to assist him financially until Kavanagh died in 1967. Kavanagh was a notable religious poet, though his long poem The Great Hunger (1942) offered a bleak and unsparing view of Irish Catholicism. Journalist Emmanuel Kehoe reflected on the unlikely patronage, writing that even that "epic exercise in savage indignation did not lose Kavanagh the patronage" of McQuaid, and concluded that the archbishop "must have seen in him a deep and authentic Catholicism". On Kavanagh's death, McQuaid told his widow that he had previously arranged for her husband to be cared for at a private nursing home when necessary, but that it had not been "God's will."

== Death and legacy ==
On 7 April 1973, McQuaid was too ill to get up at his usual time of 6.30 a.m. to say Mass at his private residence, Notre Dame de Bois. He was taken to Loughlinstown Hospital, where he died within an hour. Shortly before his death, he asked a nurse if he had any chance of reaching heaven. She told him that if he, as archbishop, could not get to heaven, few would. This answer appeared to satisfy him, and he lay back on the pillow to await death. He died at about 11 a.m. He is buried in St. Mary's Pro-Cathedral in Dublin, the seat of the Roman Catholic Archdiocese.

In his book Twentieth Century Ireland, published in 2005, Dermot Keogh writes:

Ostensibly the old order was changing. The resignation of two figures from Irish public life at the beginning of the 1970s reinforced that perception. On 4 January 1972 [sic], John Charles McQuaid retired as archbishop of Dublin after spending over 30 years in the post; he died on 7 April 1973. Éamon de Valera retired from the presidency in June 1973; he died on 29 August 1975. Both men had been close friends in the 1930s. They were representative of a culture of service that had been a feature of the political life of the young state. In the 1970s both men had lost their relevance. But the culture of service, upon which both had built their public lives, was an ever-diminishing influence in a state which had come to revere the philosophy of radical individualism.

In an article in The Irish Times on 7 April 2003, McQuaid's biographer, John Cooney, provided a different slant to the observations of Keogh:

Generally, there was a consensus that McQuaid's death marked the end of the era of Renaissance-style prelates. Officially, the President, Éamon de Valera, was "deeply grieved" to hear the news. In the privacy of Loughlinstown Hospital Dev wept over the corpse of the Holy Ghost priest on whose behalf he had lobbied the Vatican in 1940 for elevation to the See of Dublin and the Primacy of Ireland. Although their relationship at times was strained, both men co-operated to control people's lives for so long in a closed and puritanical society which the writer Seán Ó Faoláin memorably decried as a "dreary Eden".

== Notes ==
Catholic Church titles
Preceded by Edward Joseph Byrne	Archbishop of Dublin; 1940–1972	Succeeded by Dermot J. Ryan
