= Maynooth Catechism =

The Maynooth Catechism was a modified version of a Catechism drawn up in 1775 by James Butler, Archbishop of Cashel. It was "ordered by the National Synod of Maynooth. . . . for General Use throughout the Irish Church" in 1882. A new revision was undertaken by a committee of priests, in 1892, under the direction of William Walsh, Archbishop of Dublin, but the revised catechism was never published. In the 20th century in Irish schools it was known as the "Green Catechism" from the colour of its cover. The James Joyce short story "A Painful Case" references this catechism.

== Content ==
After a short Introduction on God and the creation of the world and on man and the end of his creation, it treats in turn of the Creed, the Commandments, Prayer, and the Sacraments. The answers are short and clear, and, though Yes and No are excluded, the form of the answers is not always a rigid repetition of the words of the question.
