= Trudder House =

Trudder House, later known as Newtown House and then River Lodge, is a property owned by the Health Service Executive in Newtownmountkennedy, County Wicklow, Ireland that has been at the centre of a series of controversies since the 1970s.

In 1900, the Sisters of the Holy Faith set up a convent at Trudder House and opened primary schools for girls of the local parish and boys up until the age of 8.

== The 1970s ==
In 1975, as Trudder House, the Dublin Committee for Travelling People, a voluntary group co-founded by former Bewley's Café owner Victor Bewley, set up the residential home for children from the travelling community who had appeared before the courts. The house was established following a fire in a Dublin bookshop, the APCK bookshop in Dawson Street, in January 1975, apparently started by traveller children who were sleeping rough at the rear of the shop. Eight boys, aged between 10 and 14, were charged with starting the fire along with other charges. The case highlighted the lack of facilities for such children and Trudder House was the eventual outcome. It was funded by the Eastern Health Board, and boys were sent to the home after being sentenced by the courts. In August 1985, New Hibernia magazine reported 'irregularities' at the home and allegations of beatings and homosexual child abuse.

Duncan McInnes was director of Trudder House from 1975 until he left Ireland in 1981 and moved to Scotland, and then moved to Canada before dying in 1990. It has been claimed that he beat his victims "black and blue" before raping and sexually assaulting them throughout his period in charge of the residential centre.

== The 1990s ==
Supported by Bishop Desmond Williams, who had recently moved into the home, in the mid-1990s, 19 young travelers had made allegations of sexual abuse against six people associated with the residential home. Frances Fitzgerald asked the then Minister for Health, Michael Noonan about allegations of abuse, who advised that the Eastern Health Board and the Gardaí had been investigating allegations of abuse of residents at Trudder House, and that an investigation file in this matter was forwarded on 4 December 1995, by the Gardaí to the Director of Public Prosecutions. The home closed in this form in April 1995 and residents were moved to Ballyowen Meadows. Victims are entitled to redress from the Redress Board. The Gardaí informed the courts in 1998 that at least one victim made a complaint to one of the people in charge at Trudder House. That led to an internal inquiry .. but gardai were not informed. It was not until two days before Christmas 1994 that the first complaint in relation to sexual abuse at Trudder House was made to Gardaí.

On December, 1995 an investigation file was forwarded to the Director of Public Prosecutions following an 11-month Garda investigation into allegations received that children at Trudder House, Newtownmountkennedy, County Wicklow had been sexually abused by five male staff over a 19-year period from 1975 to 1994. As part of the investigation, gardaí travelled to the United Kingdom and, with the assistance of Scotland Yard, interviewed former residents of Trudder House then residing in the UK.

Brendan Kelly, from Galway, joined after McInnes had left, and was found guilty of two counts of attempted buggery and sentenced to seven years imprisonment on 9 March 1998, has been the only person charged with sexual offences at the home. He was released on appeal the following year, at the appeal judge did not order a retrial, noting that in the seven years between Kelly leaving Trudder House and being charged with the offences, he had married and was a responsible member of society.

In 1996, the building became a secure unit, in an emergency response to an urgent state demand to provide secure places for disturbed young children. The unit came under the spotlight after a number of juvenile residents climbed onto the roof and caused extensive damage when they tore up slates and hurled them onto staff cars.

== The 2000s ==
All children had been moved from the secure unit in September 2000, following the death of Kim O'Donovan (15) who died from a drugs overdose a month earlier, four weeks after she had absconded from the centre. In February 2001, the Irish Social Services Inspectorate recommended closure in a report that was highly critical of various practices at the unit, including excessive use of physical force and the lack of trained staff.

== The 2020s ==
By 2019, the house had been idle for over five year, and Jennifer Whitmore, then a Councillor at Wicklow County Council urged the Local Authority to purchase it from the HSE. In 2023 it was revealed that the house and lands hade been valued at €1.2m.

In April 2024, it was reported that the house and its associated site was proposed for use to house asylum seekers, largely in tents. There were a number of clashes between protesters and the police at the site. The house itself was in very poor repair and the Irish Examiner stated that "it is understood" that it is not suitable for housing, and was subsequently set ablaze by protesters. The residents were moved to Dundrum that November following particularly cold weather. As of October 2026, the area remains vacant, and in July 2025 a Councillor has sought removal of the extensive graffiti.

In January 2026, the government confirmed plans to return Trudder House, now referred to as River Lodge, to the Health Service Executive (HSE), following the cessation of its use as emergency accommodation for international protection applicants in December 2024.

Figures reported in 2026 indicated that more than €2.8 million had been spent on establishing, maintaining and operating the site during 2024. A further €1.4 million was spent in 2025, including approximately €1.3 million on security, despite the property remaining unoccupied.

In May 2026, the HSE confirmed that the Department of Justice intended to return the site during the second quarter of the year, subject to restoration works being completed to an acceptable standard. At that time, no definitive plans had been announced for the property's future use.
