= Edward Joseph Byrne =

Former Archbishop of Dublin

The Most Reverend Edward Joseph Byrne
- Archbishop of Dublin; Primate of Ireland
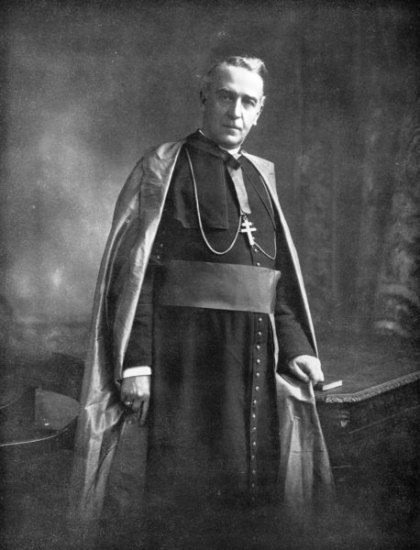
- Church: Roman Catholic
- See: Dublin
- In office: 1921–1940
- Predecessor: William Joseph Walsh
- Successor: John Charles McQuaid

Orders
- Ordination: 8 June 1895 (Priest)
- Consecration: 29 August 1921 (Archbishop)

Personal details
- Born: 10 May 1872 Dublin, Ireland
- Died: 9 February 1940 (aged 67) Dublin, Ireland

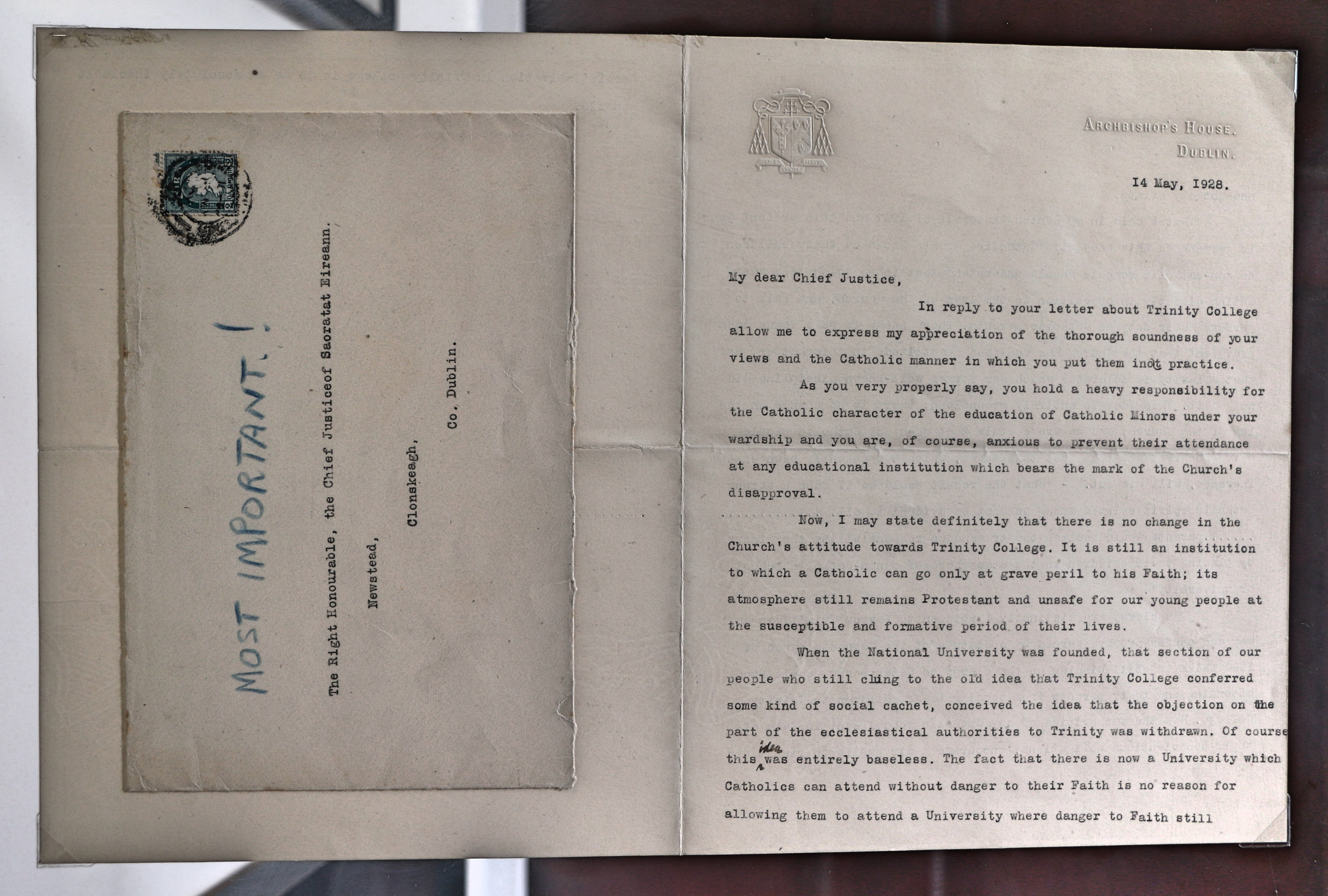
Letter reaffirming the church's attitude towards Trinity College

Edward Joseph Byrne (10 May 1872 – 9 February 1940) was an Irish prelate of the Catholic Church. He served as Archbishop of Dublin from 1921 until his death in 1940.

== Early life and education ==
Byrne was born in Dublin to Edward and Eleanor (née Maguire) Byrne. His father was a farmer from County Wicklow. There were three children in the family, all boys, and Edward was the only one not to die in infancy.

He studied at Belvedere College and Holy Cross College, Clonliffe before proceeding for theological studies at the Irish College, Rome. He was ordained a priest on 8 June 1895 at St. John Lateran.

== Ministry ==
His first post was as curate to Rush, County Dublin from 1895 to 1898. He then moved to Kilsallaghan and Rolestown from 1898 to 1899. The following year, he spent at Howth before moving to Blackrock. He was appointed Vice Rector of the Irish College, Rome from 1901 to 1904 and returned as a curate to the Pro-Cathedral where he remained until 1920.

Bryne was appointed Auxiliary Bishop of Dublin and Titular Bishop of Pegae by Pope Benedict XV on 19 August 1920. He was ordained a bishop by Archbishop William Walsh at the Pro-Cathedral on 28 October of the same year.

Byrne was translated as Archbishop of Dublin and thus Primate of Ireland on 29 August 1921. His motto was: "In Te Domine Speravi". He was later appointed Assistant at the Pontifical Throne and named a Knight Grand Commander of the Order of Malta.

== Archbishop of Dublin ==
Byrne became Archbishop at a critical time in Irish history. During his early years as Archbishop, at the time of the Irish Civil War, he tried to bring about peace by calling a conference of the leaders, but no basis for agreement could be found. Arguing that the majority of the Irish people supported the Treaty, he advised de Valera not to split Sinn Féin, even if he was defeated in the Dáil; however, this advice was ignored. Byrne objected to the execution of Erskine Childers and other anti-Treaty supporters, and the policy of reprisals by both parties. After the hostilities ended, while he still maintained an interest in political matters, he was, and became, much more interested in the spiritual well-being of his flock.

Byrne was very involved with the pastoral workings of the diocese and was extremely interested in the changing social conditions. He had a parish of over 20,000 people, many of whom were living in sub-standard conditions, and who had to be re-housed in new estates in the suburbs. He supervised the provision of schools and churches to serve the new parishes created and viewed all his work from a spiritual angle and was considered a wise and prudent ruler.

Byrne supported the religious ban on Catholics attending Trinity College Dublin. He reaffirmed this attitude on behalf of the Catholic Church in a letter in 1928. According to Byrne, Trinity College creates a Protestant atmosphere which is perilous for young Catholics.

Two major commemorative events can be seen as the highlights of his episcopacy, namely the centenary of Catholic emancipation in 1929 and the Eucharistic Congress of 1932. The thirty-first International Eucharistic Congress was held in Dublin from 20 to 26 June 1932.

== Relations with the Irish State ==
Byrne had generally cordial relations with the governments of both W. T. Cosgrave and Éamon de Valera, advising them on the issues of divorce and the constitution respectively. Unlike the other bishops - and in particular, unlike his eventual successor John Charles McQuaid who had already started corresponding with de Valera on this matter - he was prepared to agree to the omission of any specific reference to the Catholic Church in the 1937 constitution. While his pastorals from the 1920s and 1930s reveal some of the typical hierarchical concerns of the period, such as immodesty and evil literature, he was cautious in lending moral sanction to emergency legislation.

He was afflicted with a wasting muscular disease throughout the 1930s, but remained as archbishop until his death in 1940, when he was succeeded by John Charles McQuaid.

He is buried in the vaults at the Pro-Cathedral.

== Bibliography ==
- Morrissey, Thomas J. (2010). Edward J. Byrne (1872–1941), The Forgotten Archbishop of Dublin. Dublin: The Columba Press. ISBN 978-1-85607-703-3. Archived from the original on 21 July 2011.
- "Dublin, Lord Archbishop of, and Primate of Ireland" . Thom's Irish Who's Who . Dublin: Alexander Thom and Son Ltd. 1923. p. 69 – via Wikisource.

Catholic Church titles
| Preceded by William Joseph Walsh | Archbishop of Dublin; 1921–1940 | Succeeded by John Charles McQuaid |
