= Cromcastle Court flats =

Flat complex in Kilmore, Dublin

- Árasáin Cúirt Chaisleán na Croma
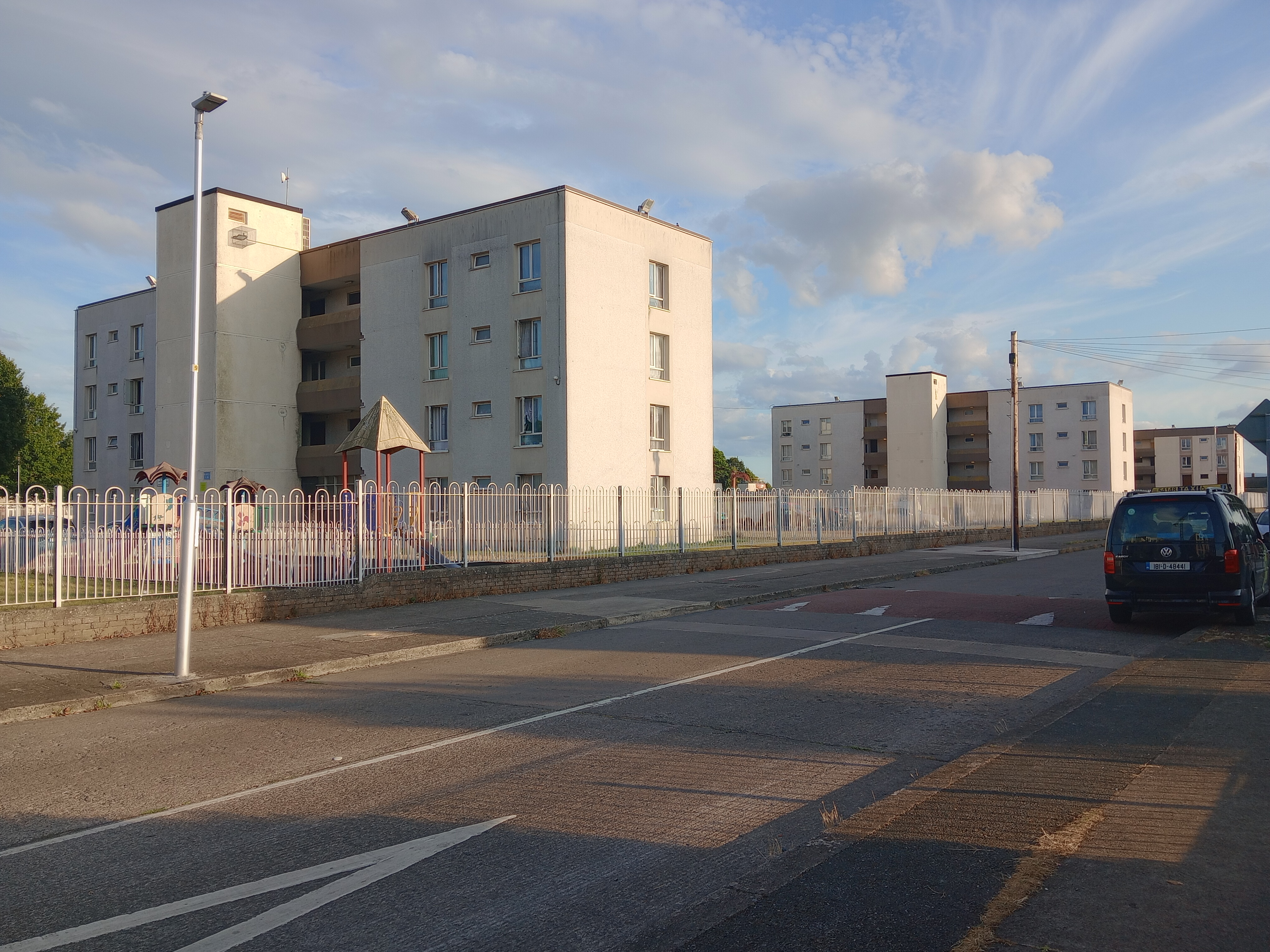
- The Cromcastle Court flats in August 2026

- Location in Dublin
- Alternative names: Kilmore flats

General information
- Status: Completed
- Type: Residential
- Location: Cromcastle Park, Kilmore, Dublin 5, Dublin, Ireland
- Coordinates: 53.3930°N 6.2156°W
- Year built: 1971; 54–55 years ago
- Owner: Dublin City Council

Technical details
- Material: Concrete

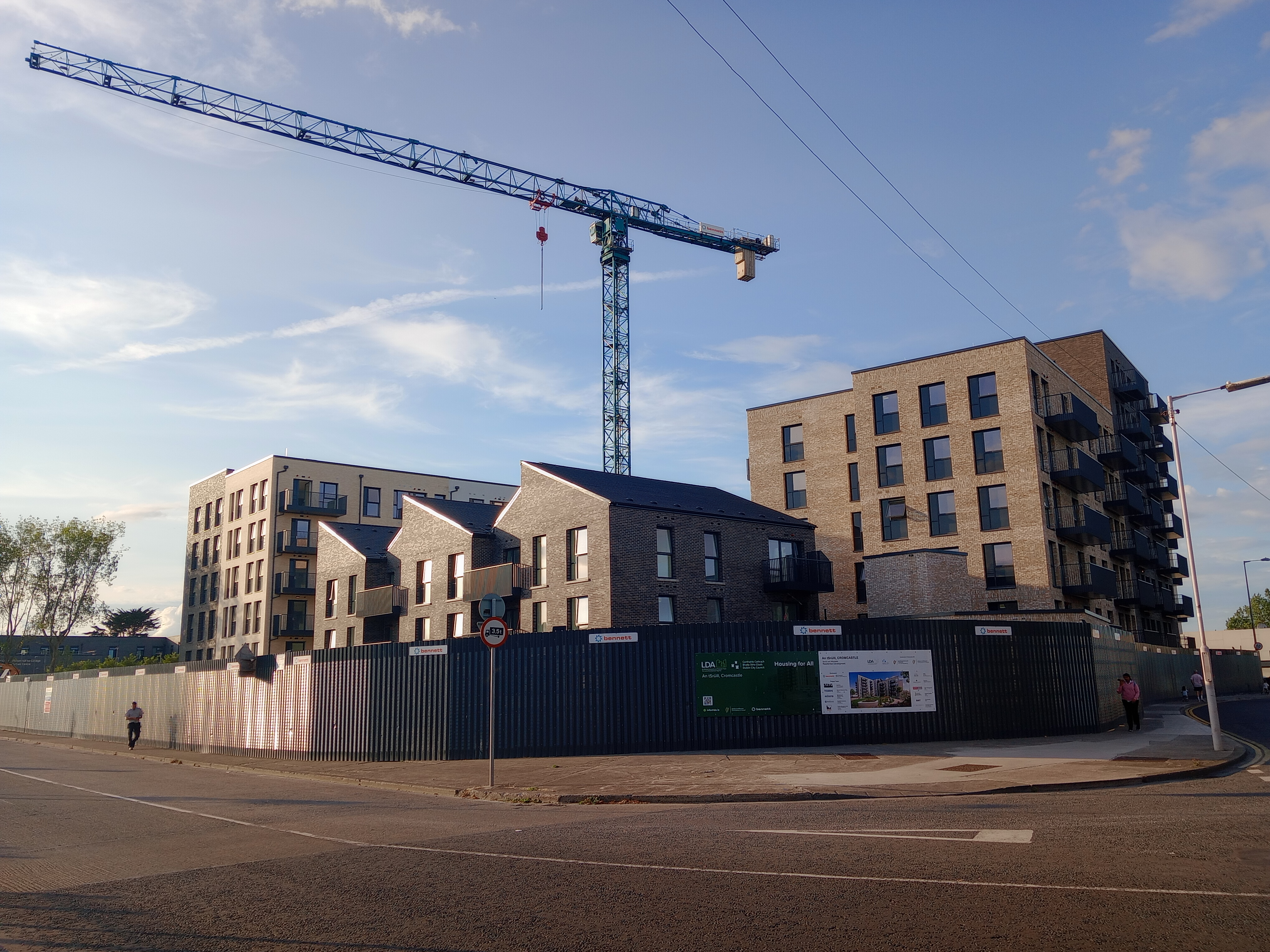
Development on the Old Coalyard

The Cromcastle Court flats (Irish: Árasáin Cúirt Chaisleán na Croma), also known as the Kilmore flats, are a flat complex in the Kilmore area, and the suburbs of Coolock, in Dublin, Ireland. They are due to be demolished during 2026. The flats face the Northside Shopping Centre, which is on Oscar Traynor Road. Built in 1971 by Dublin City Council in the same style as the Ballymun Flats, they are the last surviving building of that type in Dublin.

They are notorious for poor conditions over the years, with reports of mould, damp, leaks, and issues with the heating and water. These conditions have sparked several protests. In its earlier years, it was a high-profile area for murders and shootings. In May 2026, after several delays, demolition work started on the flats which were vacant of residents. The Dublin City Council expect the flats to be fully demolished by the end of 2026, with the construction of new homes starting in 2028.

== Background and early history ==
Cromcastle Court was built by Dublin Corporation, now known as the Dublin City Council (DCC), in 1971 via the same pre-fabricated concrete method used in the Ballymun Flats. The flats consist of 128 homes in eight blocks. In 1972, as part of the 1970–1973 Republic of Ireland rent strikes, a protest in Cromcastle Court took place, and the Cromcastle Court flats were one of the main places where tenants protested. The protest stemmed from An Garda Síochána attempting to evict a family for not paying their rent. An urban renewal for the complex was granted planning permission in 2009, although it was not acted on. In 2012 a "human barricade" was set up to prevent workers from coming into the flats; this was due to the level of noise they were making, and locals saw it as a disturbance.

Throughout its history there have been two shootings. The first was on 29 April 2006, when 21-year-old James Egan was shot twice, once in the leg and once in the stomach, over a €200 debt. One man, Michael Brennan, was ruled guilty and sentenced to 15 years in prison. In 2008, 34-year-old convicted drug dealer Anthony Foster was shot to death with a single bullet in the staircase of his flat as he was going to collect his children.

== Living conditions and demolition ==
In June 2018, it was found that eight blocks of flats had heavy corrosion, such as a staircase, which was painted over; some flats were blocked off by the Dublin City Council. They cost around €250,000 to repair. In September 2018, a maintenance programme was put in place for the flats, and a project manager was assigned to the regeneration of the complex. The project manager also allowed residents to discuss what needed to be fixed in the estate.

From 2015 to 2019, DCC installed thermostats and added external wall insulation to the flats. They stopped allocating new homes to tenants so they would empty out and regeneration could start on them. On 16 August 2019, a fire broke out in one of the flat blocks. While An Garda Síochána launched a criminal investigation, nobody was charged. Other incidents involving fire occurred in September 2015 and October 2019. In 2022, several residents moved out due to the fear of their safety, calling it a "deathtrap" and demanding "proper houses".

Councillor John Lyons, backed by political parties Sinn Féin and Social Democrats, tabled a motion opposing regeneration through use of Section 179a of the Planning and Development and Foreshore (Amendment) Act 2022. It would allow DCC to neglect feedback from councillors with the public's support. He claimed that this would undermine civic engagement and spur architectural flaws that would have been fixed in the consultation process. The next day, by phone, he said, "In a democratic society, you should have the right to engage in the planning process."

From December 2024 to May 2025, a study was conducted by Maynooth University as part of their Just Housing research project which found that residents of the flats were living in dangerous and unhealthy conditions. The study, in collaboration with Community Action Tenants Union, was funded by the Environmental Protection Agency of the Department of Climate, Energy and the Environment. It found mould, damp, leaks, issues with heating and hot water, pest infestations, overcrowding, and poor water quality. In February 2025, residents formed a protest march to DCC offices in Coolock, requiring priority transfers to more suitable housing. The survey's author, Fiadh Tubridy, said that "urgent intervention is needed to address the problems tenants are facing". In an RTÉ News interview, resident Amy Rooney stated that "My daughter saw a mouse run across the cooker", continuing that she had to put a sock in her door so it would close correctly. She also said that there were flats worse than hers.

On 5 May 2026, demolition works started on the flats, with plans to replace them and the former site of the Old Coalyard with 152 new houses as part of a larger development of 350 houses. The Dublin City Council expects the flats to be demolished by the end of 2026, with work starting on the 152 homes by 2028. They are the last surviving prefabricated concrete buildings in Dublin.

== Gallery ==
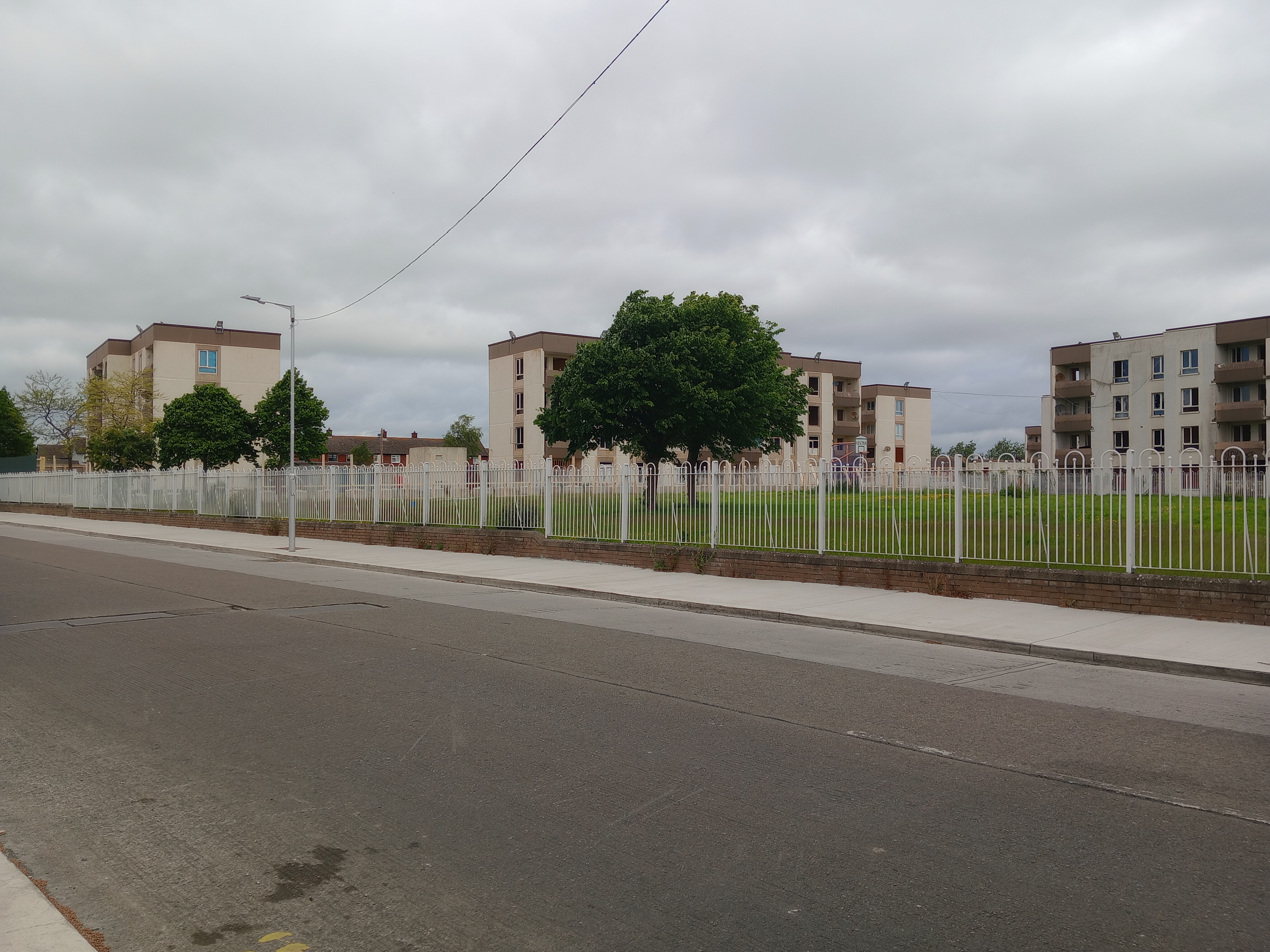
Cromcastle Court flats in June 2026 during overcast.

A block of the Cromcastle Court flats during golden hour.

== See also ==
- Coolock feud – Connected murders that started in 2019
