= Desmond Williams (bishop) =

Irish bishop

Bishop Desmond A. Williams (19 April 1930 – 24 February 2006) was an Irish Roman Catholic priest who served as an auxiliary Bishop of Dublin.

He was born in Dún Laoghaire, Co. Dublin in 1930, Williams was educated locally by the Christian Brothers at Eblana Avenue. He studied for the priesthood at Holy Cross College, Clonliffe and the Gregorian University in Rome. Fr. Williams was ordained in June 1955. Williams worked as a school teacher in Bray, Co. Wicklow, before being appointed to archbishops house. He was instrumental in founding the Share Collection.

In 1959, while a priest in the Church of the Holy Child, Larkhill/Whitehall, he founded St. Kevin’s Boys football club.

Fr. Williams worked with the travelling community and joined Dublin Committee for Travelling People, which was established in 1965 by Victor Bewley. In 1975 he helped set up Trudder House in Co. Wicklow, a residential home and services centre for travellers.

In 1976, he was appointed episcopal vicar for finance in the archdiocese and was awarded the title Monsignor. Monsignor Williams served as Chair of Catholic Social Service Conference (Crosscare), the diocesan social services charity, from 1980 until 1990. He was appointed auxiliary Bishop of Dublin in 1985 (titular bishop of Summa).

In 1994, Bishop Williams was instrumental in the setting up of the Irish Penal Reform Trust, and served on its management committee.

Bishop Williams died suddenly in February 2006 at the Holy Family Residence in Clonskeagh. At his funeral mass in the pro-cathedral, St. Kevin's F.C. provided a guard of honour.
