= Crosscare =

Crosscare is a social care services provider in Dublin, with a Catholic ethos, which was established by the Roman Catholic Archdiocese of Dublin in the 1940s. Also known as "St. Laurence O'Toole Catholic Social Care CLG" and "Crosscare, The Catholic Social Service Conference", it is registered as a charity with the Charities Regulator in Ireland.

== History ==
Crosscare was founded during The Emergency in 1941 (inaugurated on 17 April as the Catholic Social Service Conference) by Archbishop John Charles McQuaid and it initially provided "penny dinners" throughout its 27 food centres.

Crosscare's offices are based on the grounds of Clonliffe College. As of 2021, it employed approximately 280 full-time staff, approximately 200 part-time employees, and had over 1000 volunteers contributing to it. It is funded in part by the Irish government; with other ad hoc funding coming from contributions the public mainly during its annual church collection.

Its services include providing homeless accommodation services and support, food provision, youth services including residential accommodation, care for the elderly services, information and advocacy services for Irish emigrants/returning emigrants/immigrants as part of Crosscare Migrant Project (formerly Emigrant Advice), housing and welfare Information, refugee services, community development programmes, Neilstown Welfare Rights Project, AIDS task force, drugs awareness and counselling as well as a number of community services. Crosscare, as part of its work, lobbies government of issues it is concerned about and on behalf of those who use its services. It produces reports and compiles statistics on the sectors in which it provides services.

Crosscare instigated Ireland's first food bank during the 1980s, and collects food, donated from businesses and distributes it to its service users.

The Drug Awareness Programme (Crosscare, Clonliffe College) runs a Certificate in Addiction Studies at NUI Maynooth.

== Crosscare Migrant Project ==
Crosscare Migrant Project (formerly Emigrant Advice) was integrated into Crosscare the 1990s, and provides information and advocacy support to immigrants living in Ireland, as well as Irish people moving abroad and returning to Ireland. Their work with Irish emigrants is funded by the Emigrant Support Programme of the Department of Foreign Affairs.

Additionally, Crosscare Migrant Project conducts research into contemporary Irish migration, offers training and informational events, and initiates social policy campaigns. They also produce two bi-monthly newsletters called Emigration News for Irish emigrants and intending emigrants, and Le Chéile aimed at organisations who provide support to Irish emigrants.

== Governance ==
Crosscare is governed by a council whose members serve a three-year term. As of 2023, the chair was Evelyn Cregan. Fr. Desmond Williams (later bishop) served as the chair of Crosscare from 1980 until 1990. Other former members include Rev. Dr. Maurice Reidy who stood down for health reasons in 1995.

== See also ==
- Catholic Church in Ireland
