= Victor Bewley =

Irish philanthropist

Victor Bewley (24 May 1912 – 19 May 1999) was an Irish philanthropist, activist and heir to the family business, Bewley's cafe. In his obituary, the Irish Times described him as "one of the states most notable philanthropists".

Victor was son of Ernest and Susan Emily Bewley, and was the second of that Quaker family's six children. Victor married Winifred Burne in 1937.

== Early life ==
Bewley was born at Danum, the family estate in Rathgar, and was the second of six children of Ernest Bewley (qv) and Susan Emily Bewley (née Clarke) of Doncaster. His father, founder of Bewley's Oriental Cafés in Dublin, had previously been married to Bertha Ann Clark, a first cousin of Susan, who died in 1908 without children. His mother, the daughter of missionary parents in Madagascar, spent her early years there before returning to England and later working as a psychiatric nurse. Known for her practical outlook and concern for marginalised groups, she strongly influenced her son, who shared her reserved and empathetic disposition.

Raised in a devout Quaker household, Bewley developed an early appreciation of nature on the Danum estate. He later recalled childhood winters spent by the fire watching his father carve wooden models. Bewley was educated at Rathgar Junior School and, from the age of twelve, at Bootham, a Quaker boarding school in York.

From an early age, Bewley considered a missionary career, inspired by accounts of Madagascar from his mother. He also expressed interest in music and art, though he did not pursue these professionally. Within the family, it was assumed that he would eventually succeed his father in managing the business. After completing his schooling in York in 1929, he entered the firm at age 17, taking charge in 1932 on the death of his father. Though reluctant at first, preferring artistic and rural pursuits over city life, he later regarded the position as an opportunity to benefit others.

In 1930 Bewley renewed a childhood acquaintance with Mary Winifred (Winnie) Burne, daughter of a Terenure hardware merchant. Following her father's death, Bewley began visiting her home, and their friendship developed through shared involvement in the Dublin Young Friends Group and regular recreational activities such as tennis and country walks. Their courtship began after the death of Bewley's father, and they were married on 9 June 1937 at Churchtown Meeting House.

== Bewley's Cafes ==
When Victor Bewley assumed control of the family business in 1932, the company was burdened with significant debt, largely due to the opening of a third café on Grafton Street in 1927, alongside existing premises on Westmoreland Street and South Great George's Street. To stabilize the enterprise, he expanded its operations from a café and bakery model into a full restaurant service. Prices were kept deliberately affordable, broadening the customer base and reflecting Bewley's values of inclusivity and fairness. Although hesitant about leadership, he embraced his role, taking responsibility for staff welfare and engaging in philanthropic activities. During the Second World War, he organized food and clothing assistance for residents of Dublin's tenements and provided the Westmoreland Street restaurant as a base for preparing meals for impoverished children. These initiatives contributed to the association of the Bewley name with social responsibility and charitable work in mid-20th-century Dublin.

Bewley remained head of the family business for five decades, during which he fostered strong bonds of trust and loyalty between employer and staff. Known for his customary tweeds and pipe, he was a visible presence in the cafés and took a personal interest in employees. His approach to management was most clearly expressed in the creation of the Bewley Community Trust in 1972, developed with his brothers Alfred and Joe. The scheme allowed long-serving staff to become shareholders in the company, with dividends matched by contributions directed to disadvantaged communities. Despite its ultimate financial failure and dissolution in 1981, the initiative reflected Bewley's commitment to socially conscious business practices and his broader philosophy of altruism.

== The Travelling community ==
In the early 1960s, Bewley began working to improve public attitudes towards the Traveller community in Ireland. He believed that access to education and improved halting facilities were essential for Travellers' welfare. In 1965, following a visit to a halting site in Cherry Orchard, Dublin, he helped establish the Dublin Committee for Travelling People alongside Lady Eleanor Grace Butler and Vincent Crowley. Four years later, the committee became the National Council for Travelling People, with Bewley serving as secretary.

"There is no reason why Travellers, properly accommodated, should devalue property, but even if they did, are not people more important than property?" Victor Bewley - 1977.

During this period, he also invited Traveller families to live on his farm in the Dublin Mountains, an initiative that prompted national press coverage and local opposition. In 1974, following anti-Traveller protests in Clondalkin, he was appointed special adviser to the Minister for Local Government on the government's settlement programme for Travellers. In this role, he travelled throughout Ireland to assess living conditions and spoke at public meetings on behalf of the community. In July 1976 he was awarded an honorary doctorate from TCD for his work on behalf of Travellers. Bewley remained active in Traveller-related causes for more than two decades, gaining a reputation for his commitment to social advocacy and charitable work. This work was bought policy orientated, as well as more practical - such as a voluntary school for travellers in Cherry Orchard receiving free milk and buns from Bewley. On his retirement from Bewley's in 1977, he committed himself more fully to his government role as special advisor for Travellers, from which he eventually retired in 1988.

== Northern Ireland ==
During the period of the Troubles in Northern Ireland, Bewley participated in efforts to promote dialogue across the sectarian divide. He engaged in discussions with members of both loyalist and nationalist paramilitary groups and recorded a particular impression of Joe Cahill, chief of staff of the IRA, who spoke with him about his appreciation for nature and the outdoors.

Bewley was also part of a small group involved in a series of meetings with members of the IRA during the 1970s. In 1972, at the request of IRA leader Dáithí Ó Conaill, he acted as an intermediary by delivering a message of peace to the British government. In addition, he co-chaired cross-border and cross-community meetings in the early 1970s alongside fellow quaker - Denis Barritt.

== Personal life ==
Although born into privilege, Bewley encountered personal difficulties during adulthood. In his thirties he began to struggle with persistent shyness, which he later came to regard as a symptom of deeper psychological issues. Reflecting on this period, he described himself as “slipping in the top storey”. The combined pressures of professional responsibilities and family life may have contributed to this crisis, and in 1939 he turned to his friend, the artist Basil Rákóczi (qv), who introduced him to psychoanalysis. In his memoirs, Bewley characterised the experience as an “undiluted hell”, highlighting the severity of his inner struggles, in contrast to the composed and courteous manner he generally displayed in public.

Beyond his professional and personal challenges, Bewley was devoted to his family. He regularly spent holidays in the countryside with his wife and three daughters, often painting landscapes in the open air. He also derived considerable satisfaction from managing his farm and caring for his herd of dairy cattle.

Ten years after his retirement, Bewley was diagnosed with Parkinson’s disease. He left his residence in Brittas, Co. Wicklow, to live at New Lodge, a Quaker nursing home in Donnybrook, where he died on 19 May 1999. A memorial meeting took place three days later at Churchtown Meeting House, attended by former colleagues and members of the Traveller community with whom he had worked. In accordance with his wish to donate his body to Trinity College Dublin for medical research, his burial at Temple Hill, Blackrock, Co. Dublin, did not occur until 11 July 2000. The Irish Independent reported that he bequeathed just over £328,617 in his will Much of the details of Bewleys private struggles only came to light when his Grand-daughter published his memoirs in 2002.

John Healy wrote in 2020, "The last Bewley’s owner, Victor Bewley, was a gentle, compassionate man, a philanthropist who believed that all men were born equal and deserved equal respect."

== Memoirs ==
In 2002, Bewleys Granddaughter Fiona Murdoch released "Victor Bewley's Memoirs", which have been described as "A frank and vivid account of Victor Bewley's life, as told to his granddaughter".

== See also ==
- "RTÉ Archives - Plans to implement a government programme to provide housing, education and healthcare for Travellers.", featuring Bewley.
