= William Walsh (archbishop of Dublin) =

Catholic prelate, first chancellor of the NUI

The Most Reverend William Joseph Walsh
- Archbishop of Dublin and Primate of Ireland
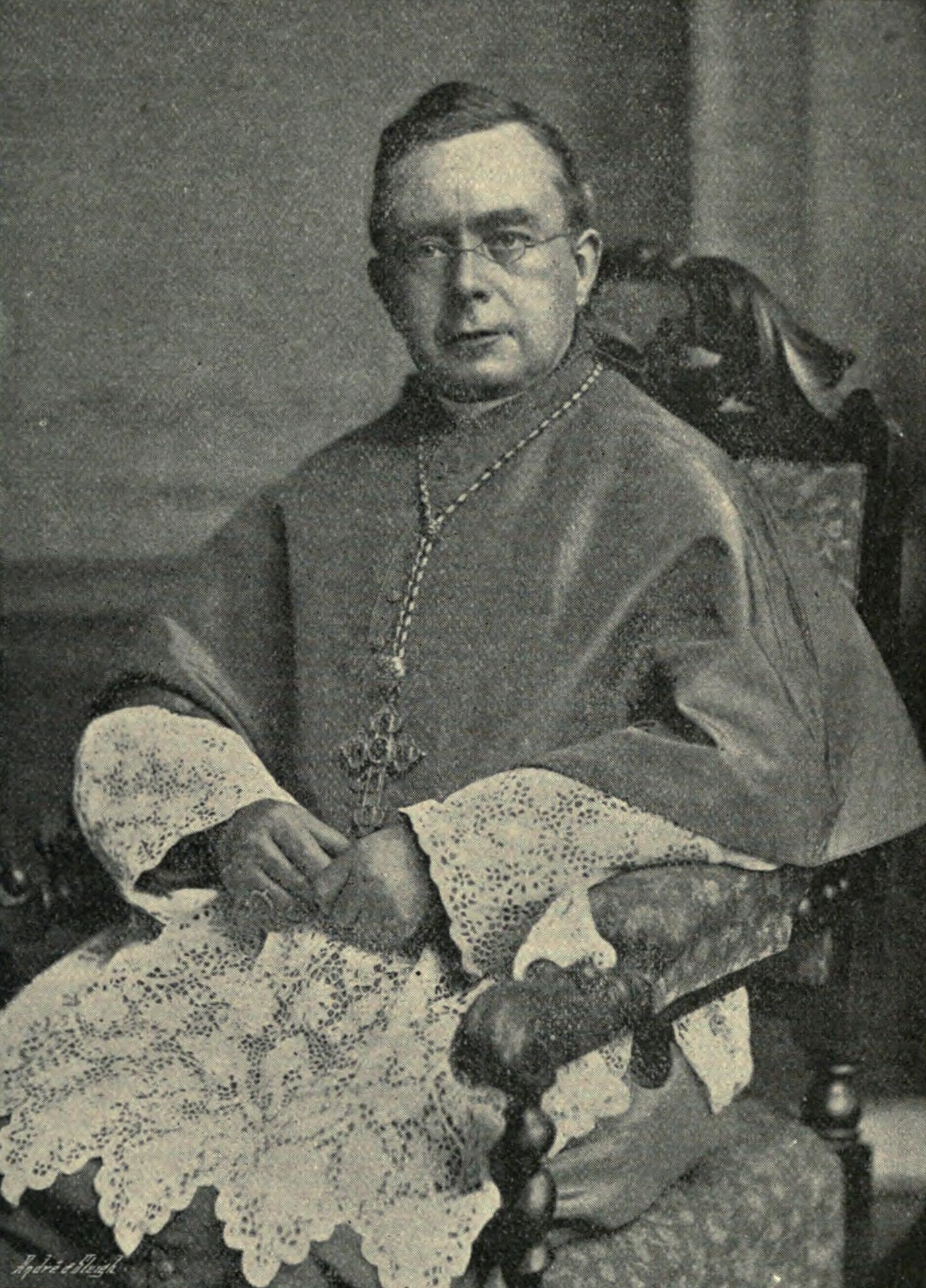
- See: Dublin
- Installed: 1885
- Term ended: 1921
- Predecessor: Edward MacCabe
- Successor: Edward Joseph Byrne
- Other post: Chancellor of the National University of Ireland

Orders
- Ordination: 22 May 1866 (Priest)
- Consecration: 2 August 1885 (Archbishop)

Personal details
- Born: 30 January 1841 Dublin, Ireland
- Died: 9 April 1921 (aged 80) Dublin, Ireland
- Buried: Glasnevin Cemetery, Dublin, Ireland
- Denomination: Catholic Church
- Occupation: Cleric
- Education: Catholic University of Ireland; Maynooth Seminary College
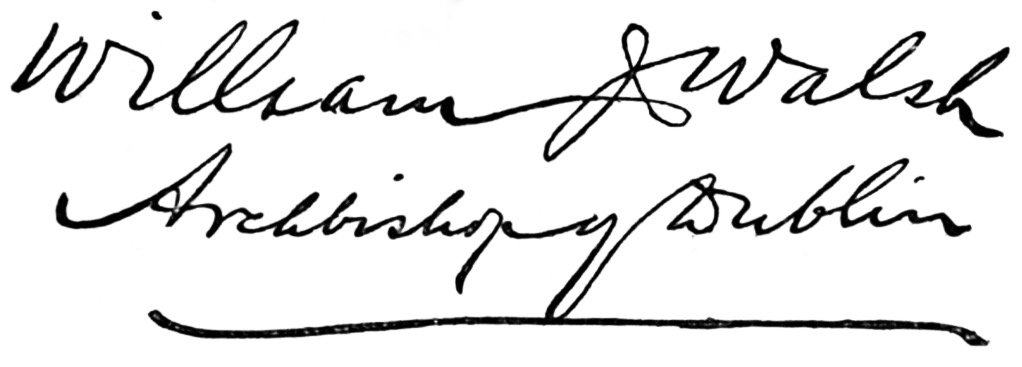
- Signature

William Joseph Walsh (30 January 1841 – 9 April 1921) served as the Roman Catholic Archbishop of Dublin from 3 July 1885 until his death in 1921.

== Early life and priestly ministry ==
He was born at 11 Essex Quay in Dublin, the only child of Ralph and Mary Perce Walsh. His father was a watchmaker and jeweler. William inherited his sympathy for Irish nationalism and independence from his father, who had the boy enrolled in the Repeal Association before he was two years old. William was educated locally at Mr Fitzpatrick's School on Peter St. and at St. Laurence O’Toole Seminary School, Harcourt St, Dublin. In 1856, he went to the Catholic University of Ireland and three years later St. Patrick's College, Maynooth where he became Professor of Theology in 1867. He was appointed vice-president of Maynooth in 1878 and president in 1880. A poor preacher, he made the press his pulpit, and made a name for himself in the areas of land law and education.

== Archbishop ==
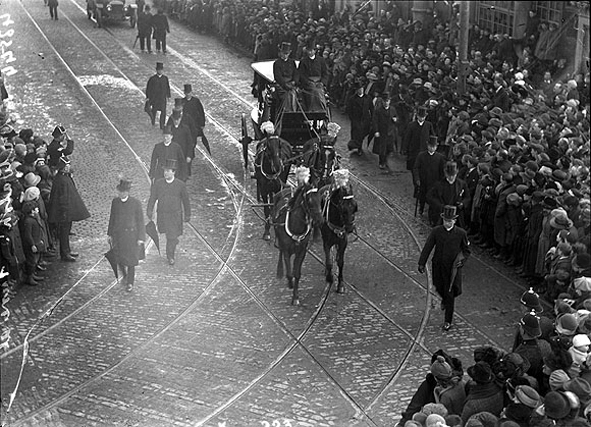
Funeral procession for Dr. Walsh, 14 April 1921

The Land issue divided the Irish hierarchy. Walsh supported agrarian reform on behalf of the rural population. Walsh was openly sympathetic to Irish nationalism, and an advocate of both Home Rule and agrarian land reform. It was his support for this movement, led by Michael Davitt, which made the Vatican honour Michael Logue in Armagh with the dignity of Cardinal in 1893 rather than Walsh in Dublin.

Walsh served on the Senate of the Royal University of Ireland (1883–4) and as part of the Commission of National Education (1885–1901).

He was appointed Chancellor of the newly founded National University of Ireland in 1908, a position he held until he died, after which he was succeeded by Éamon de Valera.

Walsh has been described as "the greatest archbishop of Dublin since Laurence O'Toole."

Walsh Road in Drumcondra, Dublin, is named after him.

== Publications ==
Walsh wrote: the following texts:

- A Plain Exposition of the Irish Land Act of 1881 (1881).
- The Queen's Colleges and the Royal University of Ireland (1883–1884).
- The Irish University Question (1897).
- Trinity College and the University of Dublin (1902).
- Trinity College and its Medical School (1906).
- Harmony of the Gospel Narratives of the Passion, Resurrection and Ascension of Our Blessed Lord (1907)

Catholic Church titles
Preceded by Edward MacCabe	Archbishop of Dublin and Primate of Ireland; 3 July 1885 – 9 April 1921	Succeeded by Edward Joseph Byrne
Academic offices
New title	Chancellor of the National University of Ireland; 1908–1921	Succeeded by Éamon de Valera
