= Firearms regulation in the Republic of Ireland =

Firearms policy in the Republic of Ireland is subject to control measures that rank among the strictest globally. With approximately seven civilian firearms per 100 people, Ireland is the 107th most armed country in the world.

Firearm laws include strict legislation governing licensing and application of it by the Gardaí. The legislation has multiple overlapping Firearms Acts that define it, but the core principles include: all firearms must be licensed individually, each applicant must have a good reason for having the firearm, a safe place in which to use it, a secure place in which to store it, and be of sound mind and temperate habits.

The Firearms Act, 1925, states that a legal licence is required by law to own or possess a firearm in the Irish Republic. Failure to adhere to the law may result in fines or imprisonment and can result in firearms being seized by the Gardaí. The Firearms Act, 1925, also lists a number of groups which are prohibited from legally owning a firearm, these include those suffering from mental health issues, those under the age of fifteen years and those who are under the supervision of the police.

Gun crime has risen steadily in Ireland as a result of the illicit drugs trade; this has led to tightening of licensing legislation over the protests of the shooting sports organisations.

With the exception of the rise in gun crime, politics in Ireland has not concerned itself very much with firearms since the Good Friday Agreement. Firearms do not have widespread visibility in most of Irish life outside farming and the shooting sports.

There are a wide range of shooting sports and organisational bodies in Ireland. The main entry points to shooting sports remain family, college clubs and the Irish Pony Club (who run a tetrathlon event that involves shooting). Other entry points include corporate shooting events and "tryout days" for events like Modern Pentathlon.

== Overview of law ==
There is no right to own firearms in Ireland. Firearms generally require a firearms certificate (commonly referred to as a licence) in Ireland, though several exceptions to this (such as couriers transporting firearms or people shooting at authorized fairground stalls or shooting ranges with club-owned firearms) are specified in sections 2(3) and 2(4) of the Firearms Act.

To obtain a firearms certificate, applicants file a form with either their local Garda Superintendent (for unrestricted firearms) or to their local Garda Chief Superintendent (for restricted firearms). Once presented, the licensing person has three months in which to issue a grant or refusal of the certificate. If the licensing person does not communicate a decision to the applicant within the three months, the applicant is deemed to have been informed of a refusal. If a licence is refused, the applicant may appeal the decision to the local District Court, who are the final authority for licensing (while a District Court's decision may be appealed, the District Court itself must overturn the licensing person's decision should the appeal be successful). The certificate lasts three years from the date of issue.

== Licensing ==
=== General requirements ===
The requirements the applicant must meet are set forth in section 4 of the Firearms Act and include, among others:

- A good reason for wanting the firearm. Hunting and target shooting qualify as do certain other activities like humane dispatch of large animals. Personal protection does not qualify as a good reason.
- A safe location in which to use the firearm (for target shooting, this must be an authorised shooting range which you must be a member of and which must maintain attendance records for the applicant and which must inform the Gardaí should the applicant's membership end).
- The details of the secure storage arrangements for the firearm (which must be inspected by the local Crime Prevention Officer. Minimum standards for secure storage are set out in the Firearms (Secure Accommodation) Regulations 2009 and increase according to the number and type of firearms being stored, but higher standards can be demanded by the Gardaí before issuing a licence.
- That granting the certificate would not result in a danger to the public or to the peace.
- Proof of competency with the firearm or the arrangements to achieve that competency, which are met by prior experience with the firearm, membership of a club where training will be provided, or completion of a training course (however no standard for such a training course has been set and so applicants are strongly advised to check with their local Garda Superintendent or Chief Superintendent (depending on which is being applied to) as to what courses they will accept).
- Permission for the Gardaí to access the applicants medical records.
- Two character references.
- If the firearm is a restricted firearm, the applicant must demonstrate that the firearm is the only type of firearm that is appropriate for the purpose for which it is required.
- Practical and dynamic shooting (defined as "any form of activity in which firearms are used to simulate combat or combat training" under the law but applying in practice to IPSC and IDPA shooting) is banned in Ireland under section 4C of the Firearms Act except for when carried out with airsoft replicas.

=== Eligibility ===
Not everyone is eligible to apply for a firearms certificate; those not eligible to apply are set out in Section 8 of the Firearms Act and include:

- anyone under 16 years of age
- anyone of "unsound mind" or "intemperate habits"
- anyone not resident in Ireland for six months before the application
- anyone convicted of certain specified offences

=== Licensable guns ===
The kinds of firearms which can be licensed in Ireland are governed by several different sections of law. EU law supersedes Irish law, but EU standards are far more relaxed than Irish ones so by and large the EU regulations do not come to the fore, except in the case of Category A firearms (the EU classification for automatic firearms) which are not licensable without direct permission from the Minister (which has never been given).

Irish law has four categories for firearms:

- Not a firearm (a category which applies to airsoft replicas as well as the obvious cases like children's toys)
- Unrestricted firearm
- Restricted firearm
- Prohibited firearm

Airsoft replicas were only removed from the firearms category with the 2006 firearms act; prior to that there was no lower muzzle energy limit before an item was classifiable as a firearm. This created the unusual situation where the laws applying to everything from a Nerf dart gun to a 20mm anti-tank rifle were identical. Following 2006, a lower muzzle energy limit for airguns of 1 Joule was introduced (in contrast to the European norm of 7.5 Joules and the UK limit of 16.27 Joules (12 foot-pounds) for air rifles and 8.13 Joules (6 foot-pounds) for air pistols). Paintball markers remain legally classified as firearms in Ireland.

Prohibited firearms are defined in Section 1 of the firearms act as any weapon of whatever description designed for the discharge of any noxious liquid, noxious gas or other noxious thing, and also any ammunition (whether for any such weapon or any other weapon) which contains or is designed or adapted to contain any noxious liquid, noxious gas or other noxious thing; this is interpreted to include devices such as pepper spray.

Differentiation between Unrestricted and Restricted Firearms categories is done in the Firearms (Restricted Firearms and Ammunition) Order 2008 and the Firearms (Restricted Firearms and Ammunition) (Amendment) Order 2009. The differentiation between Unrestricted and Restricted firearms was done by creating a list of unrestricted firearms and deeming all other firearms to be restricted. This has led to some legislative oversights of note; for example, crossbows are legally restricted firearms in Ireland because at the time of the drafting of these Orders, nobody remembered to add them to the list of unrestricted firearms (crossbows were added to the category of firearms in Irish law with the 1990 firearms act, other forms of bow are not legally firearms in Ireland). Also, the majority of paintball markers are legally classified as Short Restricted Firearms in Ireland and as such cannot be legally licensed following the 2009 firearms act (and strictly speaking, significant jail sentences and fines could result from a prosecution).

It must also be borne in mind that the licensing person, whether that is the local Superintendent or the local Chief Superintendent, have significant powers in law with regard to licensing decisions and may impose preconditions he or she requires of an applicant before granting a licence so long as such preconditions are imposed on a case-by-case basis (blanket preconditions having been deemed beyond the legal authority of the licensing person by the Supreme Court. The local Superintendent and local Chief Superintendent also have wide-ranging powers to revoke firearms certificates.

- Modifications to firearms could potentially render a firearms certificate null and void, and some modifications – such as reducing barrel length in rifles and shotguns below certain limits – are banned by law.

The legal firearms are:

- .22 LR single-shot and semi-automatic pistols and .177 air pistols may be licensed if they conform to the relevant International Olympic Committee regulations and if they also meet minimum barrel and overall length requirements and maximum magazine capacity requirements.
- All other pistols, unless they were licensed before 17 November 2008, may not be licensed; even if a Garda Superintendent or Chief Superintendent were willing to grant such a certificate, statute law prohibits it and such a certificate would be null and void. However other pistols which were licensed before this date may continue to be licensed by their original owners. The licences may not be transferred to other people, however.
- all Bolt Action (rim fire and centre fire) and semi auto rim fire rifles may be licensed. Whether a restricted or unrestricted licence is required varies according to caliber, design, magazine capacity, general appearance and other factors.
- All non-automatic shotguns may be licensed. Whether a restricted or unrestricted licence is required varies according to caliber, design, magazine capacity, general appearance and other factors. It is possible to obtain a firearms certificate for an unrestricted firearm for a shotgun and then breach the terms of that certificate by loading restricted ammunition (such as solid slugs) into the shotgun; such an offence renders the firearms certificate null and void and exposes the licensed owner to extensive penalties up to and including seven years in prison and twenty thousand euro in fines. Care to avoid this is required.
- Suppressors (also referred to as silencers or sound moderators in Ireland) may be licensed; these are legally classed as firearms in and of themselves but are usually dealt with by authorisations on a firearms certificate (signified by a capital 'S' printed on the certificate itself) rather than a separate licence.
- Crossbows may be licensed as restricted firearms; other kinds of bow do not require a licence.
- Night vision and thermal imaging sights are classified as firearms in Irish law if they are made to be attached to a firearm (hand-held versions of such devices are not controlled). These are usually dealt with by authorisations on a firearms certificate as with suppressors, but are extremely rare due to expense and effectiveness for civilian purposes.
- Starting pistols and blank firing firearms also require a firearms licence to own in Ireland; generally however they are dealt with using authorisations from the local Superintendent instead of a firearms certificate
- Stun guns of all kinds require a firearms licence to own in Ireland; as self-defence is not a Good Reason for application under the Commissioner's Guidelines, it would be very unlikely for such an application to succeed.

== Authorisation of shooting ranges ==
Shooting ranges in Ireland must be granted both planning permission by the local county council and an authorisation under section 2(5) of the Firearms Act by the local Garda Superintendent. Since the 2009 firearms act, most shooting ranges are required by their local Superintendent to be inspected and certified by the Firearms Range Inspector under section 4A of the Firearms Act.

The Firearms Range Inspector is empowered by law to enter and search any place, building, dwelling or vehicle in Ireland if he suspects that target shooting is taking place at an unauthorised location.

== Statistics ==
Unlike the UK system where a licence applies to a person and can list multiple firearms, in Ireland a firearms certificate applies to a specific firearm and not the person holding them, so owning several firearms requires several firearms certificates. This has complicated firearms statistics gathering; there is no publicly available figure for the total number of firearms owners in Ireland, for example. Prior to the computerisation of records in 2003, it would have required searching and comparing through over 220,000 paper records by hand to determine this figure; requests for this number made through Written Questions in the Dáil since 2003 have received the reply that it would take a disproportionate amount of manpower to discover the number).

Detailed statistics on makes, models and types of firearm beyond the rifle/pistol/shotgun and restricted/unrestricted categorisation are not generally maintained.

== History of firearms legislation in Ireland ==
Irish firearms law is based on several Firearms Acts, each of which amends those Acts which were issued previously. The initial Firearms (Temporary Provisions) Act, 1924 which was introduced as emergency legislation following the founding of the state, was replaced by the Firearms Act, 1925, which laid the foundations of the system of licensing that has continued unaltered until quite recently. Relatively small modifications were introduced in the Firearms Act, 1964, the Firearms (Proofing) Act, 1968, the Firearms Act, 1971, the Firearms and Offensive Weapons Act, 1990, the Firearms (Temporary Provisions) Act, 1998 and the Firearms (Firearm Certificates For Non-Residents) Act, 2000. By 2006, such was the confusion from these multiple Acts, each amending the others (and not all of which were ever actually commenced and thus were in the public record but not enforced as actual legislation); and the amendments of Irish firearms legislation by other Acts ranging from the Wildlife Acts (mostly relating to hunting law) to the Road Traffic Acts (relating to how and where firearms could be transported) and others; the large amount of secondary legislation (Statutory Instruments, which set out regulations, the design of application forms for licences and so forth, as well as the details of when various parts of the Acts came into force); as well as the introduction of EU firearms law into the canon of Irish legislation; led the Irish Law Reform Commission to recommend that all the extant legislation be restated a legal process by which all the existing primary and secondary legislation would be read as one and a single document produced as the new Firearms Act (and all prior Acts would be repealed).

The introduction of the Criminal Justice Act 2006, which contained an enormous rewrite of the Firearms Act, rewriting almost 80% of the Act completely. It was quickly followed by the Criminal Justice Act 2007 and the Criminal Justice (Miscellaneous Provisions) Act 2009, each of which amended all the preceding Firearms Acts. As of 2011, the Law Reform Commission recommendation still stands and has not as yet been acted upon; the Firearms Act consists of the initial 1925 Act amended by approximately eighteen separate Acts and is well understood by only a handful of those directly involved in its drafting, amendment or usage. Extensive complaints have arisen over the application of the legislation, with over seventy successfully prosecuted in the High Court by firearms owners by 2011. How much of this is due to the overly complicated nature of the legislation involved and the lack of formal training provided to Garda Superintendents in that legislation is unknown, but all of the cases which have been brought to court to date hinged on misinterpretations of the firearms act by one party or the other, and in one such case – McCarron-v-Kearney, the presiding judge stated I feel it necessary to add, however, that the piecemeal spreading over multiple pieces of legislation of the statutory rules for the control of firearms is undesirable. Codification in that area is almost as pressing a need as it is in the area of sexual violence.

Over 168 judicial review cases were taken to the High Court between 2010 and 2013 in a protracted series of legal proceedings all relating to disputed licensing decisions. Three of these cases were taken as "test cases" by the Department of Justice (Irish court rules do not permit class action suits and so each case had to be considered separately), and policy with regard to firearms licences was to be determined based on the outcome of these cases, according to the Ministerial Briefing document for the newly elected Minister for Justice, Alan Shatter. In one of these three cases, it was discovered that a senior Garda officer had modified the application forms after the legal proceedings had begun; as a result all 168 cases were settled out of court.

The Minister retains the authority in law to issue a Temporary Custody Order, which compels all firearms certificate holders to turn their firearms over to the Gardaí for a period of up to three months.

Target shooting outside an authorised range in Ireland is a criminal offence. However the law does not contain a definition of target shooting, and thus certain activities (such as hunters zeroing rifles before hunting) technically breach this law but in practice the law is not enforced in these specific cases.

== 1972 Temporary Custody Order and pistols in Irish firearms law ==
One of the most controversial events in the history of the Firearms Acts occurred in 1972. The Troubles in Northern Ireland (1970–1998) were becoming a security concern for the Irish government at the time, and in 1972 a Temporary Custody Order (S.I. No. 187/1972 – Firearms (Temporary Custody) Order, 1972) was issued for all privately held pistols and all rifles over .22 calibre to be surrendered to local Garda Síochána (police) stations by 5 August 1972, for a period of one month. This order was complied with, but when firearms owners returned to reclaim their firearms, they were informed that their licences had expired while their firearms were in custody (Irish firearms licences until 2008 were issued for a period of one year, and all licences were usually dealt with at the same time, usually at the start of August, though the date has changed over the years). Since the firearms were no longer licensed, they could not be returned until a new licence was issued; upon seeking a renewal of their licences, applicants were informed that a new Garda policy was in place that would refuse licence applications for all pistols and all firearms over .22 in calibre. As such, the firearms remained in Garda custody.

This situation continued until the late 1990s, when fullbore rifles of calibres up to .270 Winchester were permitted to be licensed for the purposes of deer hunting on humane grounds (prior to this, only the .22–250 cartridge was available for deer hunting and it was felt to be only barely capable of this task). All other firearms held in custody remained there, until the repeal of the Garda policy following a high court case in 2004 taken by Irish shooter Frank Brophy to obtain a licence for an Olympic target shooting pistol succeeded and the licence was granted. Following this, firearms held in storage by the Gardaí were reclaimed by those owners still alive or their descendants. As these pistols were never formally confiscated (and some were sold off by their owners and removed from Garda custody in that manner), no compensation was claimable by the owners.

Following the Brophy case, some 300 pistols were licensed in Ireland, ranging from new Olympic air pistols (which are firearms under Irish law) to reclaimed pre-1972 pistols to new centerfire pistols. While welcomed by the target shooting community, in 2008 opposition deputies Jim Deasy and Olivia Mitchell campaigned to ban these pistols on the grounds that they could be used in crime. Despite multiple parliamentary questions from as early as 2005, where it was stated that there was no proof that this was happening, Minister Ahern announced a ban on all handguns in November 2008.

This ban was fought by the various governing bodies of shooting sports in Ireland, with the result as of 2011 that air and small-bore pistols may still be licensed in Ireland, but all centerfire pistols not licensed prior to 17 November 2008 cannot be licensed.

== Firearms consultation panel ==
Following the introduction of the Criminal Justice Act 2006 and its extensive and complex rewriting of the Firearms Act, the Minister for Justice at the time (Michael McDowell) instituted the Firearms Consultation Panel, a panel chaired by the Minister through the Principal Officer of the Department of Justice, Equality and Law Reform's Firearms Section, which comprised representatives from the Gardaí, Department of Sport, firearms dealers, all the national governing bodies of the shooting sports, and other stakeholders in the Firearms Act (such as insurance providers). This panel met from 2006 through 2011 to attempt to implement the changes in the 2006 Act (and later the 2007 and 2009 Acts) where possible, and to attempt to alter the Acts where they were unworkable by providing expert advice to the department in the drafting of new legislation amendments. With the appointment of a new Minister, the FCP is in the process of being wound down, despite campaigning to extend its terms of reference to make it a permanent advisory panel.

== See also ==
- Law of the Republic of Ireland
- Overview of gun laws by nation
