= Diocese of Kilmore =

Diocese of Kilmore may refer to:

- Roman Catholic Diocese of Kilmore
- Diocese of Kilmore, Elphin and Ardagh, the Church of Ireland diocese since 1841
