= Kilmore, Dublin =

Neighbourhood of Dublin, Ireland

Kilmore An Choill Mhór (Irish)
- Neighbourhood
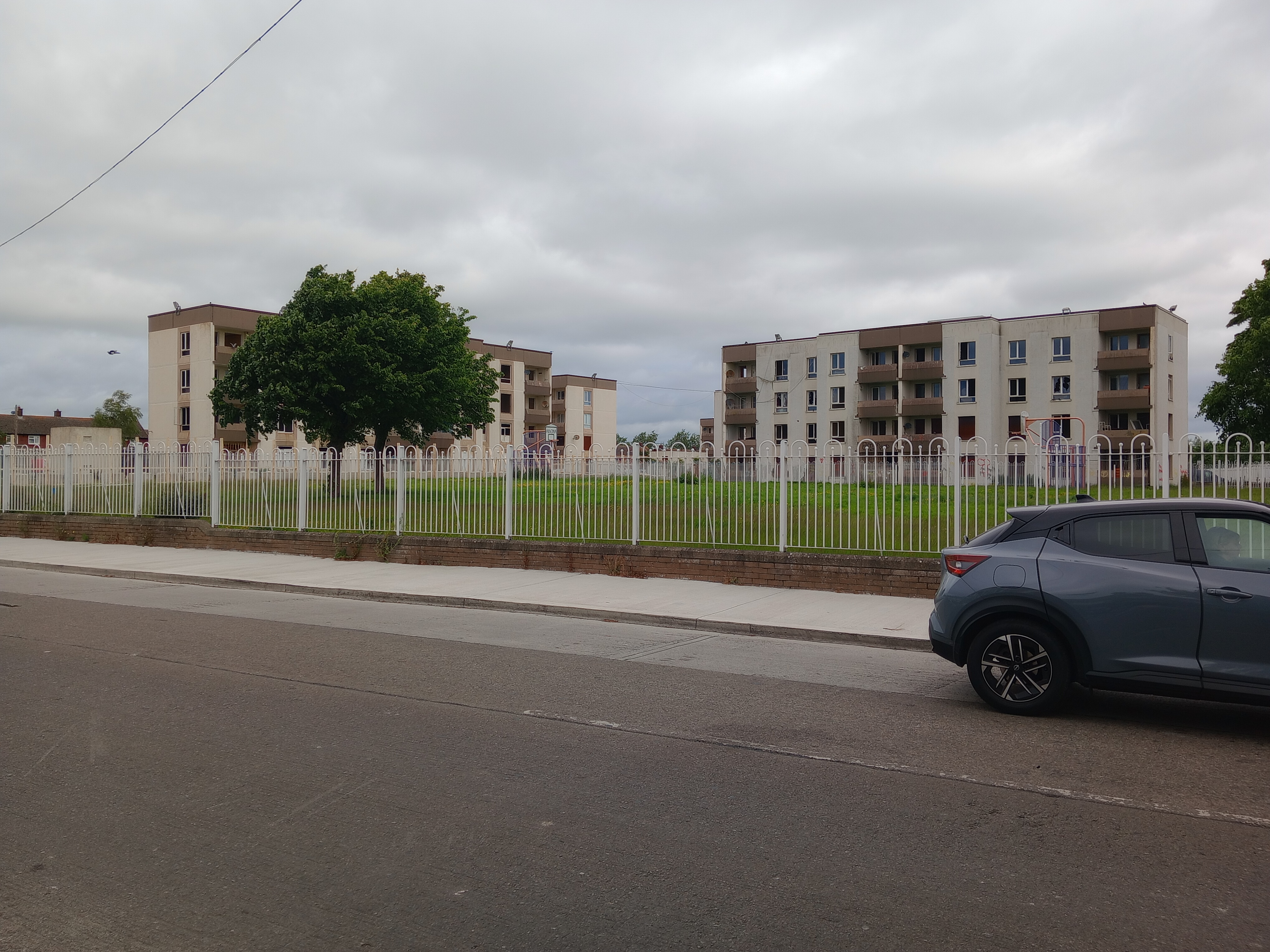
- The Cromcastle Court flats on Kilmore Road

- Location in Dublin
- Coordinates: 53°23′20″N 6°12′54″W
- Country: Ireland
- Province: Leinster
- County: County Dublin
- Local authority: Dublin City Council
- Elevation: 48 m (157 ft)
- Eircode routing key: D05, D17

Kilmore (Irish: An Choill Mhór, meaning 'Big Wood') is a mostly residential area of Dublin, Ireland. It is a Northside area, straddling parts of the suburbs of Coolock, Beaumont and Artane, and bordering Santry. A smaller area within it is known as Kilmore West.

The area lies between the Dublin 5 and Dublin 17 postal districts. There are three housing estates in Kilmore: Cromcastle, Castletimon and Kilbarron. There are public facilities such as schools, parks, shops and community centres. There is a library in Coolock, and there are multiple and sports pitches nearby.

Kilmore West is part of the larger Kilmore area and has national schools for both boys and girls, Scoil Fhursa and Scoil Ide, respectively. It also has its own parish and Roman Catholic church, St. Luke the Evangelist. The full Roman Catholic parish name is Kilmore Road West, the original townland of Kilmore Big being entirely to the west of the Kilmore Road, in Artane.

Kilmore West has its own local community centre. Notable local activities include pigeon fancying and boxing, both based in the local community centre. Soccer is also a popular pastime within the community, as is Gaelic football.

The Kilmore West Youth Project is a local charity.
