= Sexual abuse scandals in Catholic orders and societies =

Scandals in Catholic communities

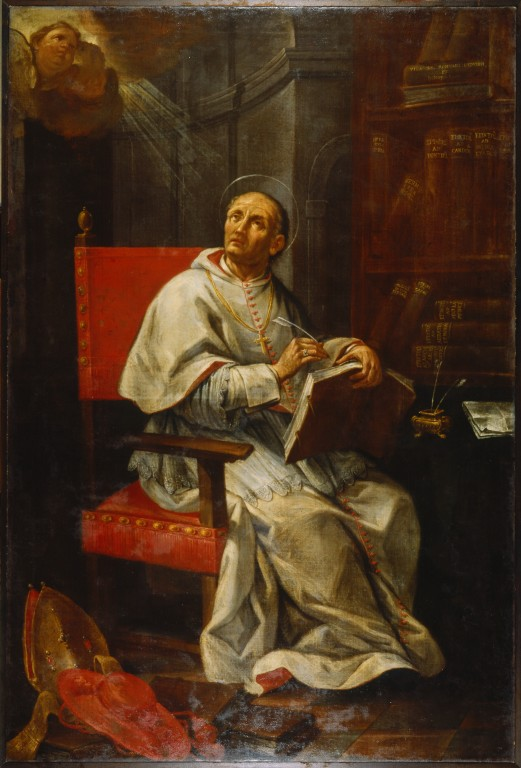
"Any cleric or monk who seduces young men or boys, or who is apprehended in kissing or in any shameful situation, shall be publicly flogged and shall lose his clerical tonsure. Thus shorn, he shall be disgraced by spitting in his face, bound in iron chains, wasted by six months of close confinement, and for three days each week put on barley bread given him toward evening. Following this period, he shall spend a further six months living in a small segregated courtyard in custody of a spiritual elder, kept busy with manual labor and prayer, subjected to vigils and prayers, forced to walk at all times in the company of two spiritual brothers, never again allowed to associate with young men." St. Peter Damian, to Pope Leo IX, A.D. 1049. Letter 31:38

As distinct from abuse by some parish priests, who are subject to diocesan control, there has also been abuse by members of Roman Catholic orders, which often care for the sick or teach at school. Just as diocesan clergy have arranged parish transfers of abusive priests, abusive brothers in Catholic orders are sometimes transferred.

In response the Roman Catholic Church published its "Instruction Concerning the Criteria for the Discernment of Vocations with regard to Persons with Homosexual Tendencies in view of their Admission to the Seminary and to Holy Orders" in 2005. However this did not address the significant problem of heterosexual abuse by members of Roman Catholic orders.

== Canon law ==
Catholic Canon law had for centuries laid down the demanding professional requirements and duties of its members, and these were summarised in the Papal encyclical "Religiosorum institutio" of 1961. Paragraph 29 emphasised that – "Among the proofs and signs of a divine vocation the virtue of chastity is regarded as absolutely necessary".

== Australia ==
=== Congregation of Christian Brothers ===
In Australia, there were allegations that during the 1970s sexual abuses took place at the junior campus of St Patricks College and St Alipius Primary School (now closed) in Ballarat, Victoria. After investigation, Brothers Robert Best, Edward Dowlan and Stephen Francis Farrell were all convicted of sex crimes. Dowlan and Best were later transferred to the senior campus, and continued to offend.

=== Marist Brothers ===
In February 2008, a teacher at Marist College Canberra, Brother John William Chute (also known as Brother Kostka), pleaded guilty in the ACT Magistrates Court to eleven charges of indecently assaulting students of the college during the 1980s. Damages for sexual abuse have also been sought by former students at Marist College Canberra.

Marist Regional College was the scene of sex offences against minors during the 1960s and 1970s. In 2007 and 2008, convictions were recorded against two former priests.

=== Pallottines ===
The Royal Commission into Institutional Responses to Child Sexual Abuse reported by weighted average that 13.7% of the Pallottine order's priests were the subject of allegations of child abuse between 1950 and 2010.

=== Salesian order ===
In Australia, there are allegations that the Salesians moved a priest convicted of abuse in Melbourne to Samoa to avoid further police investigation and charges.

In August 2008, the Salesian head in Australia, Fr Frank Moloney SDB, apologised to victims of a former priest Paul Evans convicted of a series of offences. Evans was a Salesian priest when the offences occurred at Boys' Town in Sydney in the 1980s. He was legally and canonically removed from the Order in 1991.

== Belgium ==
=== Congregation of the Fratres Van Dale ===
On 14 November 2005, former religious brothers Luc D. and Roger H. of the Congregation of the Fratres Van Dale were sentenced by a Belgian court to imprisonment for sexual abuse of mentally handicapped persons.

== Canada ==
=== Congregation of Christian Brothers ===
The Congregation of Christian Brothers has been tainted by various scandals that occurred in the 20th century, especially at the Mount Cashel Orphanage in Newfoundland and in state-sponsored institutions that they ran in Ireland.

=== Missionary Oblates of Mary Immaculate ===
Members of the Missionary Oblates of Mary Immaculate have been involved in several sex scandals in Canada, in large part due to their participation in the Residential School System. The Oblates of Manitoba, Saskatchewan and Northwestern Ontario faced over 2000 lawsuits and tens of millions of dollars in damages because of sex abuse claims. As of 2018, the Oblates of Quebec were ready to settle out of court a class-action lawsuit by 72 people who say they were assaulted by 17 Oblates who worked in Quebec's Abitibi, Mauricie and North Shore regions. As well, priests of the order have been the subject of multiple allegations and lawsuits stemming from alleged abuse at St. Anne's Indian Residential School in James Bay.

== Chile ==
=== Society of Jesus ===
The Jesuits have also been affected by abuse affairs in several of their schools and congregations in the United States and Germany. The same abusive teacher in Germany had been guilty of similar crimes in Jesuit schools in Chile and Spain.

== Germany ==
=== Society of Jesus ===
The Jesuits have also been affected by abuse affairs in several of their schools and congregations in the United States and Germany.

== Ireland ==
From the 1930s up until the early 1990s, approximately 35,000 Irish children and teenagers who were orphans, petty thieves, truants, unmarried mothers or from dysfunctional families were sent to a network of 250 Church-run industrial schools, reformatories, orphanages and hostels.

In the 1990s, a series of television programs publicized allegations of systemic abuse in Ireland's Roman Catholic-run childcare system, primarily in the Reformatory and Industrial Schools. The abuse occurred primarily between the 1930s and 1970s. These documentaries included "Dear Daughter", "Washing Away the Stain" and "Witness: Sex in a Cold Climate and Sinners". These programs interviewed adult victims of abuse who provided "testimony of their experiences, they documented Church and State collusion in the operation of these institutions, and they underscored the climate of secrecy and denial that permeated the church response when faced with controversial accusations." The topic was also covered by American broadcast media. Programs such as CBS's 60 Minutes and ABC's 20/20 produced segments on the subject for an Irish-American audience.

A documentary film series titled States of Fear which detailed abuse suffered by Irish children between the 1930s and 1970s in the state childcare system, primarily in the Reformatory and Industrial Schools, was released in 1999.

=== Report of the Irish Commission to Inquire into Child Abuse ===
A lengthy report detailing cases of emotional, physical and sexual abuse of thousands of children over 70 years was published on 20 May 2009. The report drew on the testimony of nearly 2,000 witnesses, men and women who attended more than 200 Roman Catholic-run schools from the 1930s until the 1990s.

Under a 2002 agreement between the Conference of Religious of Ireland, representing the Orders, and Irish government minister Michael Woods on the other side, all those who accepted the state/Brothers settlements had to waive their right to sue both the church and the government. Their abusers' identities were also to be kept secret.

Ireland's national police force announced that they would study the report to see if it provided any new evidence for prosecuting clerics for assault, rape or other criminal offenses. The report, however, did not identify any abusers by name because of a right-to-privacy lawsuit by the Christian Brothers order.

Shamed by the extent, length, and cruelty of child abuse, Ireland's Prime Minister Brian Cowen apologized to victims for the government's failure to intervene in endemic sexual abuse and severe beatings in schools for much of the 20th century. He also promised to reform Ireland's social services for children in line with the recommendations of the commission to Inquire into Child Abuse report. Further motions to start criminal investigation against members of Roman Catholic religious orders in Ireland were made by Irish President Mary McAleese and Prime Minister Cowen.

The highest-ranked official of the Roman Catholic Church in Ireland, Dublin Archbishop Diarmuid Martin slammed Irish Roman Catholic orders for concealing their culpability in decades of child abuse, and said they needed to come up with much more money to compensate victims.

At the conclusion of its summer meeting, the Irish Roman Catholic Bishops' Conference said that the abuse of children in institutions run by Roman Catholic priests and nuns was part of a culture that was prevalent in the Roman Catholic Church in Ireland. The bishops spent a major portion of their 8–10 June meeting discussing a report from the commission to Inquire into Child Abuse, published 20 May under chairman Sean Ryan. The commission found that church institutions failed to prevent an extensive level of sexual, physical and emotional abuse and neglect.

Following a meeting with the Irish government on 4 June 2009, the 18 Irish religious orders implicated in the abuse have agreed to increase their contribution to the compensation fund for victims. The orders also agreed to an independent audit of their assets, so that their ability to pay further compensation can be determined. In a joint statement following the meeting, the orders said they were willing "to make financial and other contributions toward a broad range of measures, designed to alleviate the hurt caused to people who were abused in their care."

In Northern Ireland the similarly tasked Northern Ireland Historical Institutional Abuse Inquiry published the "Hart report", supervised by Sir Anthony Hart, a retired Judge, on abuse in state- and church-run institutions in 2017.

=== Brothers of Charity ===
An eight-year (1999–2007) enquiry and report by Dr Elizabeth Healy and Dr Kevin McCoy into the Brothers of Charity Order's "Holy Family School" in Galway, Ireland, and two other locations, was made public in December 2007. It found that 11 Brothers and 7 staff members had sexually abused 21 intellectually disabled children.

=== Congregation of Christian Brothers ===
In Ireland, during the latter part of the 20th century, Christian brothers schools were noted for brutal and frequent use of corporal punishment.

Sexual abuse was rife. Artane Industrial school's staff hosted a number of Brothers who had repeatedly been warned for "embracing and fondling" boys. Others accused of rape, beat or bribed their victims into silence. Accused Brothers were invariably excused, lightly admonished or, typically, moved to other institutions where they were free to continue abusing children for decades.

=== Marist Brothers ===
In Sligo, County Sligo, St. John's School had five teachers who have faced abused charges, of which three were Marist Brothers. In January 2008 "Brother Gregory" (real name Martin Meaney) admitted to abusing a boy 20 or 30 times in a four-month period in 1972, apologized unreservedly and was sentenced on five sample charges to two years imprisonment. He described the boy as "a weak little lad", and told police he had "picked on children who were not getting love at home". Meaney had previously served 12 years of an original 18-year jail sentence imposed in November 1992 where he admitted eight sample charges of buggery, rape and indecent assault on other boys, out of 109 charges. These charges arose when he was teaching at Castlerea, County Roscommon.

=== Norbertine Order ===
The Norbertine Order (or White Canons) neglected to inform the police about the abuse by Brendan Smyth from the 1950s. He was eventually charged in 1994.

=== Premonstratensians ===
Northern Ireland's Historical Abuse Inquiry investigated reports that Brendan Smyth, a member of the Norbertine Order, was allowed to continue paedophilia for more than four decades, even after Smyth himself had admitted in 1994, the same year that he was jailed for his crimes, that "Over the years of religious life it could be that I have sexually abused between 50 and 100 children. That number could even be doubled or perhaps even more." Reviewers of the case agree that there was a deliberate plot to conceal Smyth's behaviour, incompetence by his superiors at Kilnacrott Abbey.

=== Salvatorian Order ===
On 19 December 2007 a Patrick McDonagh of the Salvatorian Order admitted eight counts of sexual and indecent assault on four girls (aged 6 to 10) in the period 1965–1990 in Ireland. He was sentenced to four years in prison, with the last 30 months suspended. He gave the police the names of three girls, but also admitted to assaulting six other victims whom he has refused to identify. The judge described this as "remorse" and suspended most of the sentence for his guilty plea. Aged 78 in 2007, he had joined the Salvatorians in 1955 and retired in 2004.

=== Sisters of Mercy ===
The Ryan Report described the Sisters of Mercy order's tolerating physical and sexual abuse of girls in its care in Ireland. Not only that, Mercy Sisters were accused in the report of physically, verbally and emotionally, and perhaps even sexually abusing, or allowing lay personnel to sexually abuse children under the care of the order.

=== Dominican Order ===
Vincent Mercer was convicted in 2003 and 2005 of offences at Newbridge College, County Kildare, in the 1970s.

=== St. Patrick's Missionary Society / Kiltegan Fathers ===
In May 2011, allegations of sexual abuse by a member of the St. Patrick's Missionary Society in Africa were revealed on the RTÉ programme Prime Time Investigates. Alan Shatter, the Irish Minister for Justice, stated that

I have been in touch with the Garda Commissioner about this matter who, of course, shares my concern at the revelations in the programme. The Superintendent in charge of the Domestic Violence and Sexual Assault Investigation Unit is being appointed to examine the programme. In particular, he will examine whether any criminal behaviour was disclosed which can be pursued in this jurisdiction.

Jeremiah McGrath of the St Patrick's Missionary Society was convicted in Liverpool, England, in May 2007 for facilitating abuse by Billy Adams. McGrath had given Adams £20,000 in 2005 and Adams had used the money to impress a 12-year-old girl whom he then raped over a six-month period. McGrath denied knowing about the abuse but admitted having a brief sexual relationship with Adams. His appeal in January 2008 was dismissed.

In 2003 the society paid €325,000 for abuse committed by Fr. Peter Kennedy of the Kiltegan Fathers in 1982.

=== Sisters of Nazareth ===
The international Sisters of Nazareth, formerly the "Poor Sisters of Nazareth", ran "Nazareth Houses" based in Derry, Northern Ireland, and at nearby Fahan in County Donegal. They were investigated by the Northern Ireland Historical Institutional Abuse Inquiry in 2014 for allegations that "included sexual abuse by older children, visiting priests, employees and, in one instance, a nun."

== Mexico ==
=== Fr Marcial Maciel ===
Fr. Marcial Maciel (1920–2008) founded the Legion of Christ, a Roman Catholic order of priests originating in Mexico. Nine former seminarians of his order accused Maciel of molestation. One retracted his accusation, saying that it was a plot intended to discredit the Legion. Maciel maintained his innocence of the accusations. In early December 2004, a few months before Pope John Paul II's death, Cardinal Joseph Ratzinger (who would replace him as Pope, becoming Benedict XVI) reopened a Vatican investigation into longstanding allegations against Maciel. On 19 May 2006, the Vatican Press Office, in a follow-up to the investigation, released a statement censuring Maciel but excusing him from a canonical trial because of his advanced age.

In early 2009, the order admitted that he had fathered a child. In 2010, after investigation, the Vatican released a report saying that Marcial committed "true crimes and manifest a life without scruples or authentic religious sentiment," the Vatican said.

=== Legion(aries) of Christ/Regnum Christi/Regnum Christi Federation ===
The damage is not limited to the Founder, Fr. Marcial Maciel. The order founded by him in Mexico in 1941 -currently in the process of changing its name again- has also been plagued by sexual abuse allegations. In May 2012, BBC News reported that the Legion had referred seven cases of sexual abuse by its members to the Vatican CDF department. In 2013 the Legionaries reluctantly and belatedly confirmed that former Novice Instructor in Ireland and the US, Fr. William (Guillermo) Izquierdo, a Spanish-born priest personally recruited by Maciel, had abused a minor seminarian under his pastoral care. https://www.catholicnews.com/services/englishnews/2013/legionaries-confirm-abuse-allegation-against-retired-priest.cfm Recently, Mexican TV personality Analu Salazar accused another Legionary priest, Fr. Fernando Martínez, of sexually abusing her as an eight-year-old at the Instituto Cumbres elementary school in Cancun in 1991–2. https://somefind.com/mexico/christs-legionaries-are-investigating-the-priest-accused-of-abuse-in-cancun/ Although it is believed that Martínez had been credibly accused previously and transferred by his superiors, a Legion press release included in the above article promised to investigate the allegation, as if it were hearing about it for the first time. Legion watchdog web page, ReGAIN, has reported other cases which have received scant coverage and action by Legion and Vatican authorities. https://regainnetwork.org/?s=Sexual+Abuse

== Netherlands ==
=== Salesian Order ===
In February 2010 the Salesians were accused of sexual abuse in their juvenile Don Rua in 's-Heerenberg. Salesian bishop of Rotterdam van Luyn pleaded for a thorough investigation.

== Poland ==
In 2013, Poland became another European country to discuss sexual abuse in Church. A book "Do feel afraid. The victims of pedophilia in the Polish Church tell their stories" by Ekke Overbeek and the author accused the episcopate of having no empathy towards the victims. The episcopate has criticised the book and stated that it does not address the issue and the Catholic Church authorities have stated that they will not pay compensation to the victims of sex abuse in the Church.

== Spain ==
=== Society of Jesus ===
The Jesuits have also been affected by abuse affairs in several of their schools and congregations in the United States and Germany. The same abusive teacher in Germany had been guilty of similar crimes in Jesuit schools in Chile and Spain.

== United Kingdom ==
=== Benedictine schools ===
In 2007, two former monks from Buckfast Abbey were sentenced for sexually abusing boys.

In 2004, former priest John Kinsey of Belmont Abbey, Herefordshire, was sentenced at Worcester Crown Court to 5 years imprisonment for sexual assaults on schoolboys in the mid-1980s.

=== Kiltegan Fathers ===
Jeremiah McGrath of the Kiltegan Fathers was convicted in Liverpool in May 2007 for facilitating abuse by Billy Adams. McGrath had given Adams £20,000 in 2005 and Adams had used the money to impress a 12-year-old girl who he then raped over a six-month period. McGrath denied knowing about the abuse but admitted having a brief sexual relationship with Adams. His appeal in January 2008 was dismissed.

William Manahan, the Father Prior of a Buckfast Abbey Preparatory School was convicted of molesting boys in his school during the 1970s.

=== Marist Brothers ===
In June 2017, the Marist Brothers admitted to systemic failures to protect pupils from sexual abuse at the Scottish Child Abuse Inquiry. An extensive history of abuse has emerged from two Marist schools in the Diocese of Galloway, St. Joseph's College, Dumfries and St. Columba's College, Largs.

== United States ==
=== Brothers of the Sacred Heart ===
In July 2007 in the United States a lawsuit was filed against the Brothers of the Sacred Heart which alleged that they moved around a Brother who was accused of sexual misconduct with an adolescent.

=== Congregation of Christian Brothers ===
According to the Chicago-Sun Times, in 1998, Brother Robert Brouillette was arrested in Joliet, Illinois, for indecent solicitation of a child. In 2002, a civil lawsuit was filed in Cook County, Illinois, against Brother Brouillette for sexual assault against a 21-year-old man. Brother Brouliette served as faculty at Brother Rice, in Birmingham, Michigan, at St. Laurence High School in Burbank, Illinois, and possibly other institutions . Brother Robert Brouillette was also known as Robert Sullivan according to court docket 1-07-0633 from the Circuit Court of Cook County, Illinois.

=== Congregation of the Sacred Hearts of Jesus and Mary ===
Reverend Joseph Bukoski is a Roman Catholic priest of the Hawaiian Province of the Congregation of the Sacred Hearts of Jesus and Mary. He served in the church for many years, but was removed from his post in 2003 following allegations of sexual abuse, for which he has since apologised.

=== Oblates of St. Francis de Sales ===
McCartney v. Oblates of St. Francis De Sales was a court case appealed to the Ohio Court of Appeals in which a former teacher at St. Francis de Sales High School in Toledo, Ohio sued the principal and a student advisor for slander. In 1983, the teacher was convicted of contributing to the delinquency of a minor by providing alcohol to one of his students. Although his contract was subsequently not renewed, the teacher, a former yearbook advisor, remained in touch with the yearbook staff. On a subsequent yearbook "overnight", it was reported to the faculty advisor that his predecessor had been seen drinking beer in the school parking lot with two students and that they subsequently left the premises. The faculty adviser conveyed this information to the students' parents, along with information regarding the previous conviction. The former teacher sued the school for slander. The lower court found in favor of the school and the appellate affirmed court.

In 2015, James Roth, an Oblate priest, admitted that he perpetrated child sexual abuse in Ohio.

James Francis Rapp, an Oblate priest, was convicted in 1999 in Oklahoma and 2016 in Michigan of child sexual abuse.

=== Passionist order ===
In 2003, a Passionist priest in Chicago, John Ormechea, faced his sixth accusation for allegedly abusing young boys. As in other cases, it was alleged that the local diocese knew of similar allegations, but did nothing.

=== Salesian order ===
When priests within the Salesians of Don Bosco order based in San Francisco were accused of sex abuse, the leaders chose to keep quiet. In the United States, Salesian High in Richmond, California, lost a sexual abuse case, while in Australia there are allegations that the Salesians moved a priest convicted of abuse in Melbourne to Samoa to avoid further police investigation and charges.

=== Society of Jesus ===
The Jesuits have also been affected by abuse affairs in several of their schools and congregations in the United States and Germany.

== See also ==
- Abuse
- Catholic Child Abuse Commission Report 2009
- Catholic sex abuse cases
- Child abuse
- Child sexual abuse
- Holy Orders (Catholic Church)
- Institutional abuse
- Religious abuse
- Sexual abuse
- Sexual misconduct
- Spiritual abuse
