= Family of Mary =

The Family of Mary, also known by its full name, Pro Deo et fratribus—Family of Mary (PDF-FM), is an Association of the Faithful of Pontifical Right for clergy and laity in the Catholic Church. The clerical arm of the association is called Work of Jesus the High Priest (Latin: Opus Jesu Summi Sacerdotis), the members of which bear the post-nominal title Opus J.S.S. The affiliated branch of consecrated women is called the Apostolic Sisters of the Family of Mary, with the post-nominal initials F.M.

== History ==
Bishop Pavol Hnilica, with the backing of Pope Paul VI, founded the association in 1968 under the title Pia Unione Pro Fratribus. Its original purpose was to provide material and spiritual support to Catholics of the Eastern Bloc facing persecution under Communist rule.

After the Fall of Communism, the community adopted its current name and repurposed itself as a Marian missionary organization. The Catholic Church formally recognized the association under this new form in 1995. In 2008, the Congregation for the Clergy formally established the community's clerical branch, known as the "Work of Jesus the High Priest," with Fr. Paul Maria Sigl as its founder.

== Activity ==
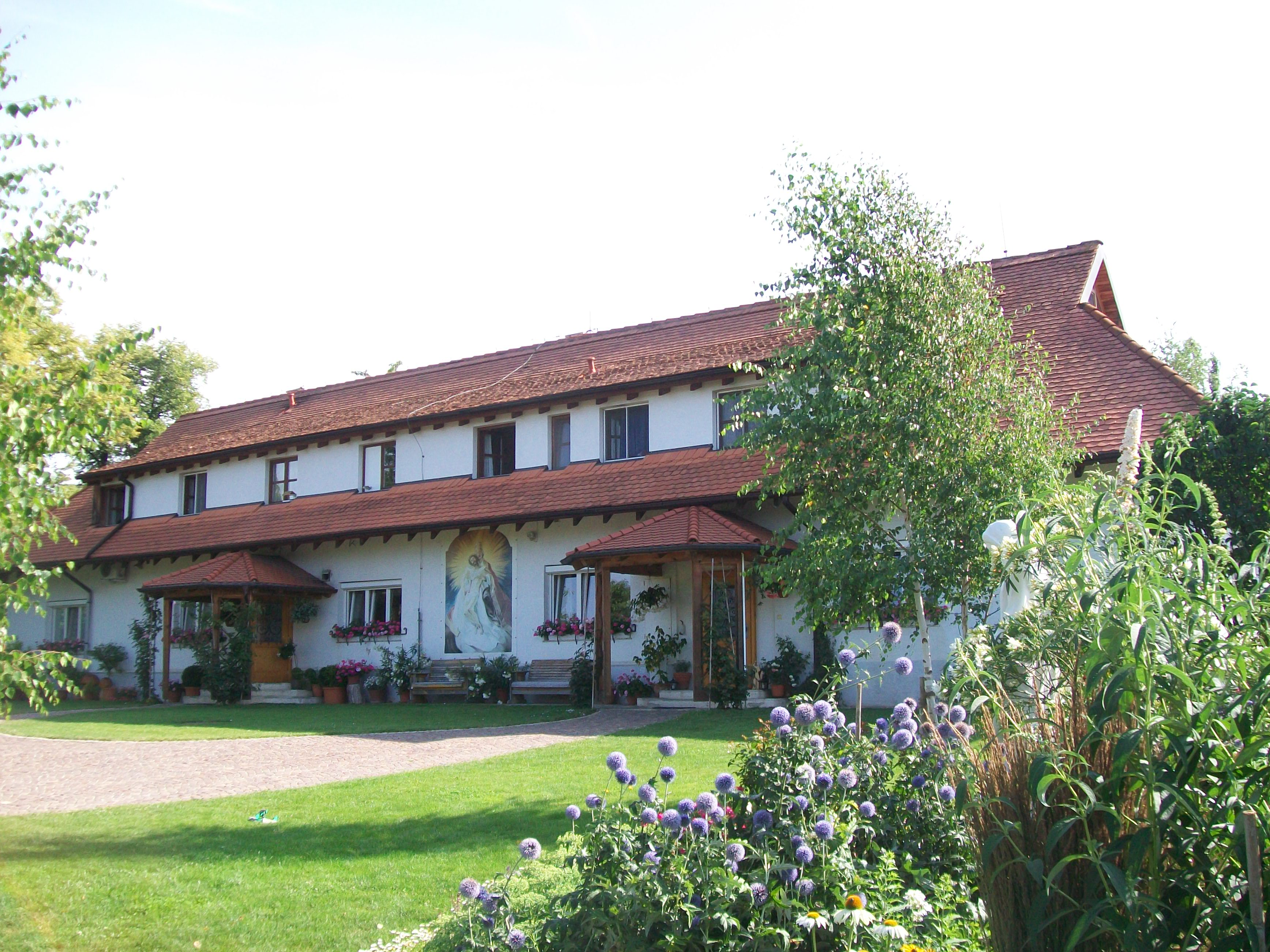
One of the association's locations, in Stará Halič, Slovakia.

The Family of Mary is primarily active in Slovakia, Germany, Austria, Switzerland, France, the Netherlands, the Czech Republic, Uruguay, Kazakhstan, and Russia.

The community has a particular focus on spreading devotion to the alleged Marian apparition entitled The Lady of All Nations. However, in December 2020, the Congregation for the Doctrine of the Faith discouraged promotion of "the alleged apparitions and revelations" associated with the Marian title of "Lady of All Nations,". While the title "Lady of All Nations" for Mary is itself "theologically acceptable", the alleged apparitions that gave rise to it are not. They were the subject of a "Negative Declaration" in 1974.

In 2020, Msgr. Lubomir Welnitz, Opus J.S.S., was appointed one of eight Papal Masters of Ceremonies under the Office for the Liturgical Celebrations of the Supreme Pontiff.

On 11 October 2024, Pope Francis approved the decision of a Vatican tribunal that found Sigl guilty of psychological and spiritual abuse and banned him from exercising his ministry for ten years.

== See also ==
- Catholic Marian movements and societies
