= Parish transfers of abusive Catholic priests =

The parish transfers of abusive Catholic priests, also known as priest shuffling, is a pastoral practice that has greatly contributed to the aggravation of Catholic Church sexual abuse cases. Some bishops have been heavily criticized for moving offending priests from parish to parish, where they still had personal contact with children, rather than seeking to have them permanently returned to the lay state by laicization. The Church was widely criticized when it was discovered that some bishops knew about some of the alleged crimes committed, but reassigned the accused instead of seeking to have them permanently removed from the priesthood.

== By country ==
=== Australia ===
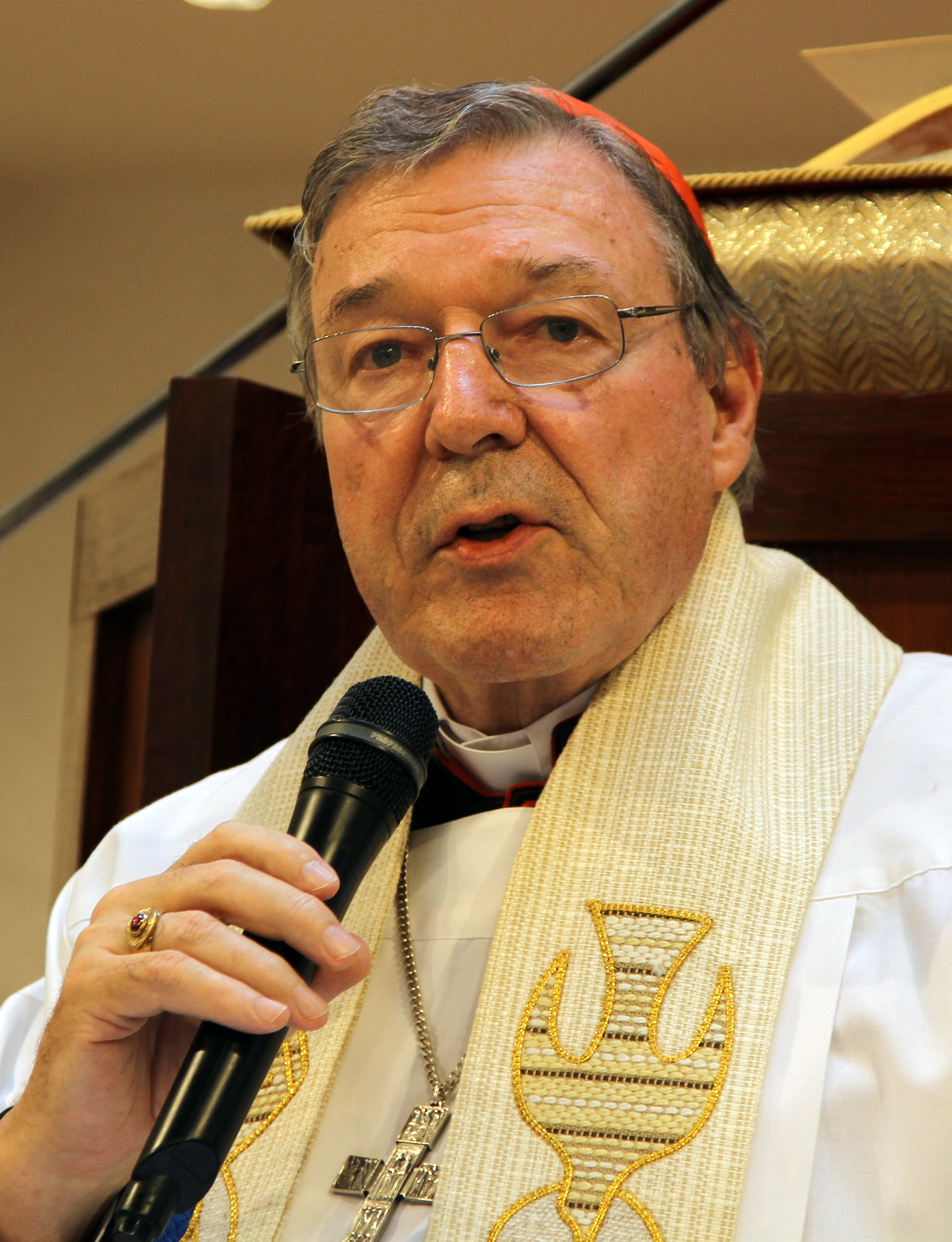
Cardinal George Pell in 2012

Cardinal George Pell sat on a committee that approved moving Australia's most notorious sexually abusive priest Gerald Ridsdale from parish to parish dozens of times, including Mildura, Swan Hill, Warrnambool, Apollo Bay, Ballarat and Mortlake, "allowing the priest to abuse countless more children while keeping the scandal under wraps".

=== Austria ===
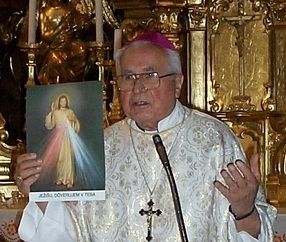
Bishop Pavol Hnilica rehabilitated multiple-convicted Austrian priest Joseph Seidnitzer in 1991.

Joseph Seidnitzer (Stainz, 1920 – Innsbruck, 1993), was an Austrian priest, missionary, and the founder and director of Priesterwerk, who was convicted multiple times for sexual abuse of boys aged 18 and over (at the time, people younger than 21 years were considered underage). His criminal method was to invite young men into his apartment, make them obedient with liqueurs, and then force them to perform sexual acts. The Tages-Anzeiger in 2010 described Seidnitzer's life as 'the classic biography of an abusive priest of his time': 'Despite his repeated relapses, the Church sought to cover up the assaults, gave him new opportunities, and simply moved him to other places. He was convicted several times in this process.' In 1954, Seidnitzer was convicted to eight months of heavy dungeon (schwerer Kerker) in Styria, in 1958 to one year heavy dungeon "aggravated by a hard bed" (verschärft durch ein hartes Lager) in Innsbruck, and in 1960, after committing two sexual assaults in Interlaken (Switzerland) and fleeing, he was arrested in Innsbruck and again convicted to 14 months imprisonment there. The Church allowed him to found his organisation Priesterwerk ("Priest Work") in 1973. Although he was suspended in 1979, Bishop Pavol Hnilica rehabilitated Seidnitzer inside the Church in 1991, and after Seidnitzer's death in 1993, Hnilica renamed his organisation Familie Mariens ("Family of Mary") and secured papal recognition for the organisation in 1995.

=== Belgium ===
In 2010, the Belgian Chamber of Representatives installed the Special Commission on Sexual Abuse to investigate sexual abuse in power relations, especially within the Catholic Church. The Follow-up Commission on Sexual Abuse produced a report in 2011, that included a regulation that no convicted priest may be moved to another parish where he could once again come into contact with children, and the Catholic Church in Belgium agreed to stop this practice. Nevertheless, bishop Jozef De Kesel of Bruges tried to appoint a priest convicted of molestation in 2008 to the parish of Middelkerke in 2014. The priest eventually backed down from the appointment. De Kesel apologised to any sexual abuse victims he might have offended when the Follow-up Commission asked him for clarification.

=== Brazil ===
Fr. Tarcísio Tadeu Spricigo was arrested after his checklist for choosing victims was found and given to police. He had molested children in at least five parishes he was moved to. In November 2005, he was sentenced to a prison term of over 14 years. The case was featured in an episode of the BBC's Panorama documentary series titled Sex Crimes and the Vatican (2006) and became an example of the Vatican's policies regarding paedophile priests.

=== Canada ===
In August 2006, Catholic priest Charles Sylvestre pleaded guilty to sexually assaulting 47 girls (aged 7 to 15) between 1954 and 1986. For four decades, the police buried all filed reports instead of acting on them, while the Catholic Church repeatedly "solved" all the complaints and accusations by moving Sylvestre to a new parish, including Bluewater, Ontario (where he was first reported), an unnamed place in Quebec, then Delhi, London, Windsor, Chatham-Kent and Pain Court (all in Ontario), where he made new victims. He died three months into his three-year jail term.

=== France ===
Bernard Preynat is a French former priest who committed multiple sexual assaults against children at a boyscout camp in Sainte-Foy-lès-Lyon between 1972 and 1991. After parents complained about Preynat's behaviour, he was moved to Neulise (Loire department) at the other end of the Roman Catholic Archdiocese of Lyon do to "penance" under the supervision of Father Jean Plaquet. Inhabitants of the village appeared to be well-aware that he was there as a church punishment for sexual transgressions, though only through rumours that were not always correct; as of 2016, there were no known cases of sexual abuse by Preynat in Neulise. In 1999, Cardinal Louis-Marie Billé transferred Preynat to Cours-la-Ville (Rhône department), where he was allowed to work with children again; in February 2016, parents accused Preynat of having (possibly sexually) abused their daughter during an irregular confessional session there in 2003. In June 2011, a former victim called Laurent came forward accusing Preynat of having sexually assaulted him in Sainte-Foy-lès-Lyon from 1979 to 1982. In September 2011, Cardinal Philippe Barbarin moved Preynat to Le Coteau (Loire department), where he was appointed in a priestly function, with his "penance" apparently being over. He was allowed to work with children again, although he was under high surveillance by other adults to make sure he was never alone with a child. In September 2014, former victims tracked down Preynat and began to campaign for him to be prosecuted. He was allowed to work with children until August 2015, and in November 2015 Preynat was indicted and his ecclesiastical court case began. On 27 January 2016, his secular court case began. Preynat was defrocked by the Catholic Church in July 2019, and on 16 March 2020 he was sentenced to five years imprisonment by the Criminal Court of Lyon.

=== Germany ===
A well-documented case involves Peter Kramer, ordained as priest in Viechtach in 1997, who abused two boys in 1999, and was convicted to three years probation in 2000, in which time he was barred from working with children and had to undergo therapy. However, in 2001 he was transferred to a parish in Riekofen where he worked with young children again, violating the court order, and in 2004 was officially appointed as the priest of Riekofen. Bishop Manfred Müller and bishop Gerhard Ludwig Müller were accused of mishandling the case, with the presiding judge commenting: "To send a priest convicted of abuse back into a parish is like a bank employing a criminal convicted of fraud as a treasurer." Kramer was imprisoned for eight years in 2010.

On 25 September 2018, the German Catholic Bishops' Conference released a report (which it commissioned in 2014) that reported that 3,677 children in Germany, mostly boys under age 13, were sexually abused by Catholic clergy members over the past seven decades. About 1,670 church workers, or 4.4% of the clergy, had been involved in the abuse. In 60% of the cases, the alleged offender escaped justice. In many of these instances, the accused priest was simply relocated to another parish without informing the new community about his alleged past crime(s). By systematically moving the priests, the Church attempted to hush up their crimes.

On 20 January 2022, a team of five lawyers of Westpfahl Spilker Wastl published a 1000+ page investigative report on child sexual abuse cases in the Archdiocese of Munich and Freising, and the ecclesiastical response to them, finding that Joseph Ratzinger (archbishop of Munich and Freising 1977–1982, later Pope Benedict XVI 2005–2013) mishandled four cases. In one case (first revealed in 2010), the Church had known that priest Peter H. had abused children (for example, it knew since the late 1970s that he had given an 11-year-old boy alcohol and had repeatedly abused him in Essen), but he was appointed to new positions, and could therefore continue his spree of abuse for 30 years. H. was then transferred to the Munich archdiocese for therapy, but soon reappointed as priest, and he resumed sexually abusing children. Even after receiving a criminal condemnation in 1986, he would not cease the abuse. In response to the Wastl report, ex-Pope Benedict (Ratzinger) denied having known about H.'s past abuse and said he was not present at the January 1980 diocesan meeting at which the decision was made to transfer H. from Essen to Munich. However, the lawyers team showed in the minutes of meeting that Ratzinger had been present, and concluded that he had to have known about H.'s past abuse.

=== Ireland ===
Tony Walsh was a Catholic priest who, according to chapter 19 of the Murphy Report (published in 2010), "was moved from one parish to the next 'to prevent a scandal' and kept on abusing children, even though his superiors knew about it."

=== Italy ===
Journalist Gianluigi Nuzzi compiled a number of cases of parochial transfers of alleged pedosexual priests in Italy. For example, in 1980, a priest who molested a boy in a school in the parish of Valleggia in the Roman Catholic Diocese of Savona-Noli, was moved ten kilometres away to Spotorno to supervise a Boy Scout troop at the local Catholic youth centre, where new complaints were made against him. Bishop Dante Lanfranconi of Savona then moved him a few kilometres away to a community centre for troubled youths in Orco Feglino. Former diocesan treasurer Carlo Rebagliati warned Domenico Calcagno, who became the new bishop of Savona in 2002, about the danger of this priest because of his daily contact with minors, but Calcagno dismissed his concerns as mere rumours. A victim of abuse who contacted Calcagno was told not to take the priest to court, because the priest "might commit suicide and then I would have that on my conscience." In 2003 Calcagno finally wrote a letter to cardinal Joseph Ratzinger for advice, providing a full documentation of claims of sexual abuse by the priest since 1980. Ratzinger (who became Pope Benedict XVI two years later) is not known to have replied, but the priest in question was later moved to Portio Magnone (12 km from Feglino) to another Boy Scout camp where he was once again reported for sexual molestation. He remained in holy orders until voluntarily quitting the priesthood in 2010 without any prosecution.

=== Netherlands ===
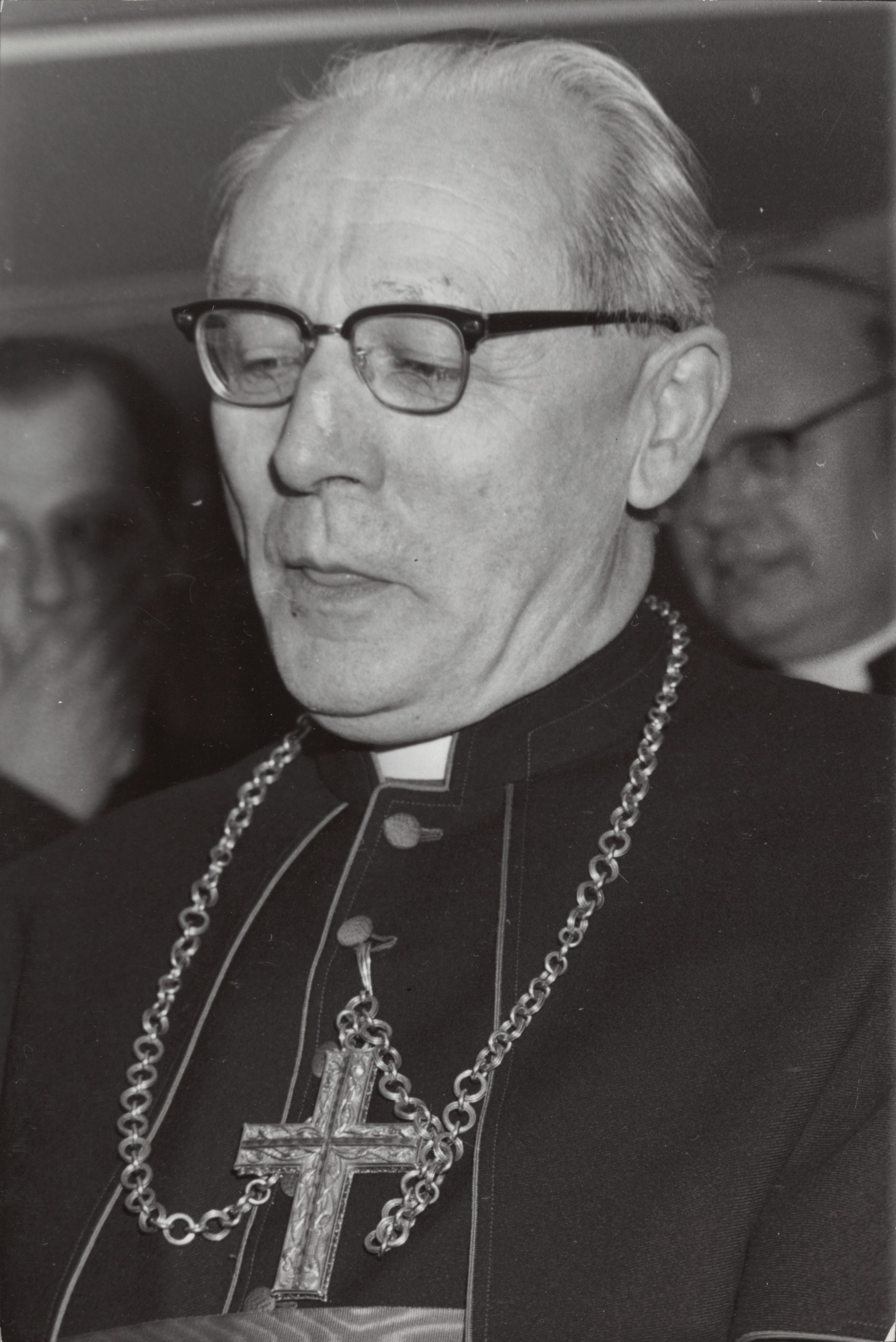
Cardinal Bernardus Alfrink, archbishop of Utrecht (1955–1975)

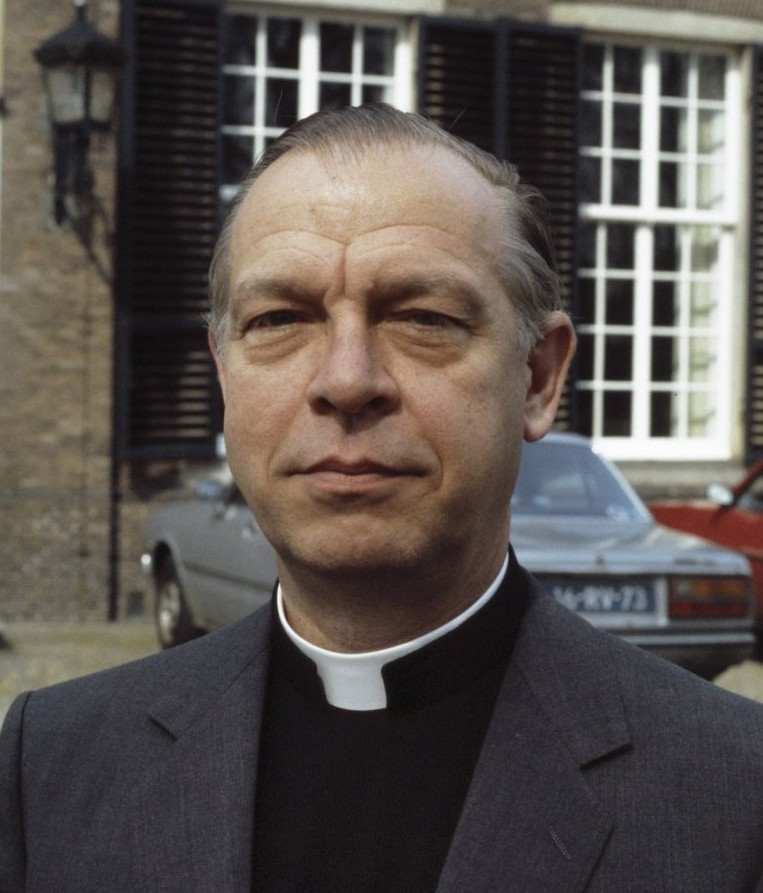
Bishop Philippe Bär transferred many abusive priests to other dioceses, abusing five boys himself.

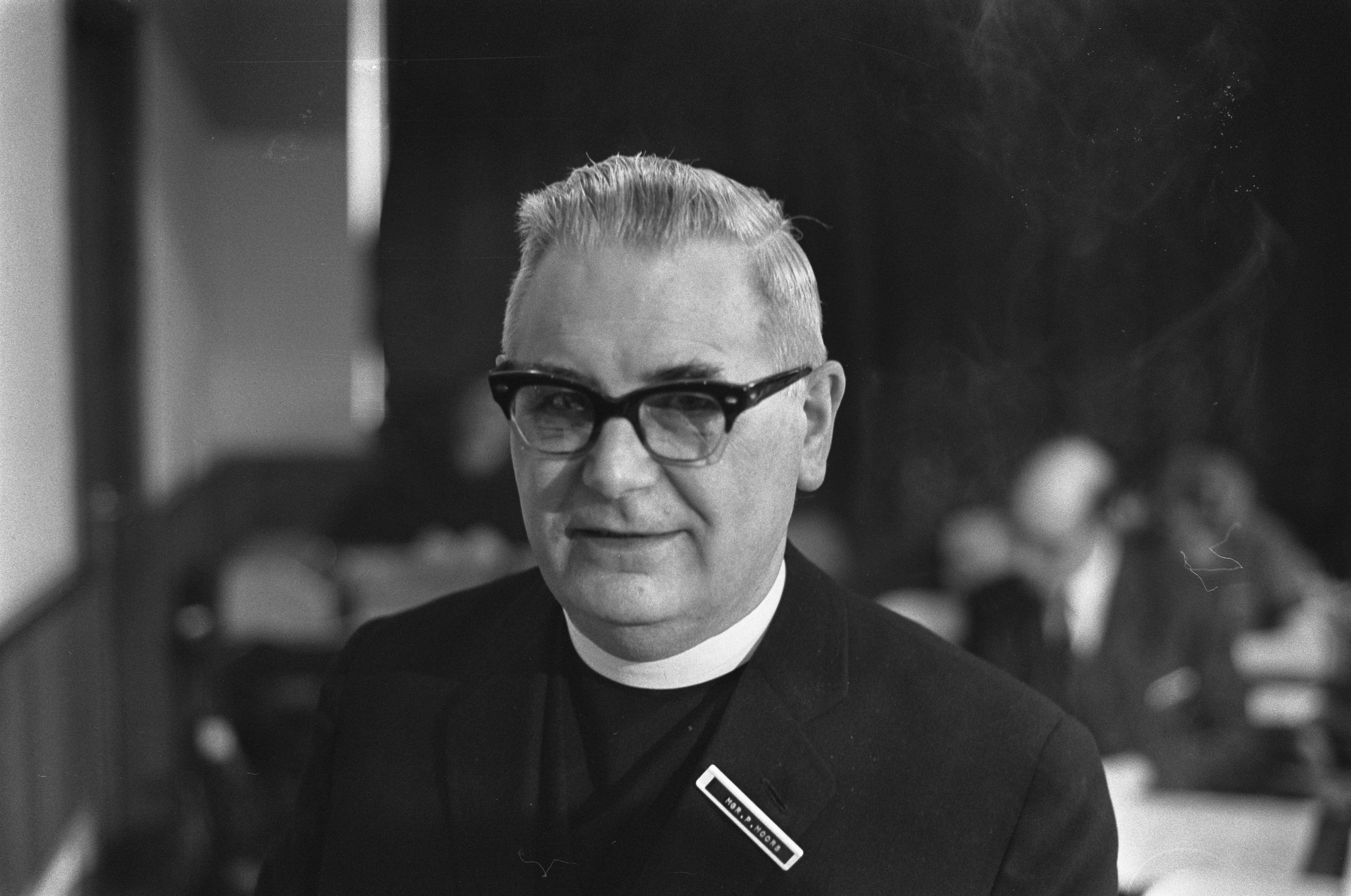
Petrus Moors, bishop of Roermond (1959–1970)

On 14 September 2018, NRC Handelsblad compiled a list of Roman Catholic cardinals and bishops in the Netherlands who ineptly dealt with accusations of child sexual abuse, including parochial transfers of suspects. At least sixteen cardinals, bishops and auxiliary bishops transferred known paedosexual priests to other parishes, all of whom were no longer in holy orders and their cases all exceeded the statute of limitations by the time of the NRC publication. The next day, a spokesperson of the Roman Catholic Church in the Netherlands confirmed that NRC's investigation was carefully conducted and the findings were largely correct.

Cardinal Bernardus Alfrink, archbishop of Utrecht from 1955 to 1975, moved a pastor, sentenced to four months in prison for abuse of underage girls, from Zutphen to Slagharen in 1956 and later to Netterden, where he abused another girl in 1967; Alfrink ignored a warning letter from another pastor and moved the convicted pastor to Eemnes and then to Lunteren. The cardinal did not intervene in a chaplain's case in Groenlo, moved another pastor to Haarle where he molested again, promoted an Utrecht chaplain who confessed to abusing boys to a priest in Braamt where he continued abusing children, and promoted an Arnhem chaplain known to have abused altar servers to pastor in Albergen where he abused another nine altar servers.

Cardinal Adrianus Simonis, bishop of Rotterdam (1970–1983) and archbishop of Utrecht (1983–2007), ignored well-documented accusations against the Albergen pastor in 1983. He appointed a man, that he knew was convicted of sexual abuse of boys in 1990 in Zoetermeer, to pastor in 1991 in Amersfoort where he abused children again, and did not prevent his 2005 appointment to pastor in Eindhoven. He ignored a victim's letter against auxiliary bishop Jan Niënhaus in 2000, and in 2007 ordained a father known to have abused pupils in a Twello boys boarding school to acolyte (leading altar servers) in Oldenzaal. In 2010, he said on live television show Pauw & Witteman that Wir haben es nicht gewußt ("We did not know about it").

Martinus Jansen, bishop of Rotterdam (1956–1970), in 1965 reappointed a priest convicted of molestation elsewhere in his diocese. He also appointed a priest, that he knew had committed sexual abuse in a pastoral relation in 1965, to religious teacher in an Oudenbosch boys boarding school; the priest went on to sexually abuse three underage boys there around 1970.

Philippe Bär, bishop of Rotterdam (1983–1993), transferred multiple priests accused or found guilty of abuse to other dioceses when he could no longer maintain their position in his own. Did not undertake action in at least five cases, and is known to have had sex with underage students of his own priestly seminary.

Ad van Luyn, bishop of Rotterdam (1993–2011), when leading a Salesian congregation in 1979 urged the police to stop prosecuting a Rijswijk priest in a case of sexual abuse; the suspect was transferred to a parish in Terneuzen where he abused children again. In 1995 he appointed a priest, who had already confessed to abusing children in 20 separate cases, to doing pastoral and youth work; when the priest transgressed again, Van Luyn waited six months before transferring him to Amersfoort in the archdiocese of Utrecht, where he once again abused children. He ignored complaints by three victims in 2002, 2008 and 2010 and covered them up.

Guillaume Lemmens, bishop of Roermond (1932–1957), maintained a priest in his diocese for 20 years, even though he knew the man was convicted in 1941 for abusing two boys and a girl in Sittard. He died in 1960; in 2011 the diocese acknowledged that a 1946 complaint against the priest for abusing a seven-year-old girl in Doenrade was valid, and that the priest in question (then director of a Heel lunatic asylum and a Sittard hospital) was examined by the police again in 1952.

Petrus Moors, bishop of Roermond (1959–1970), appointed a Belgian priest, knowing he had been convicted of sexually abusing boys, to chaplain in Broekhem-Valkenburg in 1959, where the chaplain abused boys once more. Nevertheless, Moors appointed the chaplain in 1966 to Hulsberg and in 1968 to Venlo, where he transgressed again. Moors did not act against a chaplain known to have abused multiple children; the chaplain went on to rape a 17-year-old girl in Heerlen in 1961. Despite numerous warnings, the man remained a pastor in Breust-Eijsden and later Puth-Schinnen until 1982. In 1969, bishop Moors transferred a chaplain from Maastricht, where he was known to have abused children, to Thorn, where the chaplain struck again. He appointed a Rolduc seminary teacher who had previously abused underage boys to pastor in Sittard and Tegelen.

Wilhelmus Mutsaerts, bishop of Den Bosch (1943–1960), in 1957 moved a Grave chaplain to a new parish in Tilburg, knowing he had abused an altar server 'very frequently', personally seeing to it that the matter received no publicity. In 1959, he moved the chaplain again, to an institute for deaf-mute children in Sint-Michielsgestel. One of his victims was later paid 15,000 euros for pain and suffering.

Jan Bluyssen, bishop of Den Bosch (1966–1983), transferred an Oisterwijk pastor imprisoned for five months in 1968 for abusing six altar servers to the diocese of Groningen, where he became chaplain in Sneek that same year, and later pastor in Groningen city. The victims were ordered to remain silent and not given any care; decades later, five of the victims got a combined compensation of almost €100,000. Bluyssen also destroyed documents implicating several clerics in the 1970s.

Antoon Hurkmans, bishop of Den Bosch (1998–2016), in 2004 appointed a priest to pastor in Helmond; that priest had two years earlier resigned from his position of director of the episcopal priest seminary after accusations of rape and sexual abuse of boys.

Martin de Groot, acting bishop of Haarlem (1966), in 1966 transferred a chaplain from Den Helder to a parish in Amsterdam; the chaplain had been convicted of sexual abuse in 1958.

Theodorus Zwartkruis, bishop of Haarlem–Amsterdam (1966–1983), in 1970 transferred a chaplain convicted for abuse from Amsterdam to the diocese of Groningen, where he became a pastor in Emmeloord; Zwartkruis did not inform Groningen's bishop Bernhard Möller about the chaplain's criminal history. He also transferred another chaplain three times between 1974 and 1983 after complains of child abuse. Zwartkruis had a policy of ignoring and destroying anonymous letters implicating abusive priests.

Pieter Nierman, bishop of Groningen–Leeuwarden (1956–1969), appointed an Oisterwijk pastor, who had in 1968 been convicted of sexually abusing six underage boys, to chaplain in Sneek that same year, and later to pastor in Groningen.

Joseph Baeten, bishop of Breda (1951–1962), in 1956 appointed a known paedosexual pastor from a parish on the isle of Texel (diocese of Haarlem) to the Zealandic village of Hansweet, where the pastor transgressed again in 1959 and received a one-month suspended sentence. Then, the bishop transferred him to the Catholic hospital in Halsteren.

In 2005, the Roman Catholic Church in the Netherlands introduced an obligatory screening of any priest's criminal record before any appointment can take place, and since 2014 clerics are required to provide evidence of good behaviour.

=== Poland ===
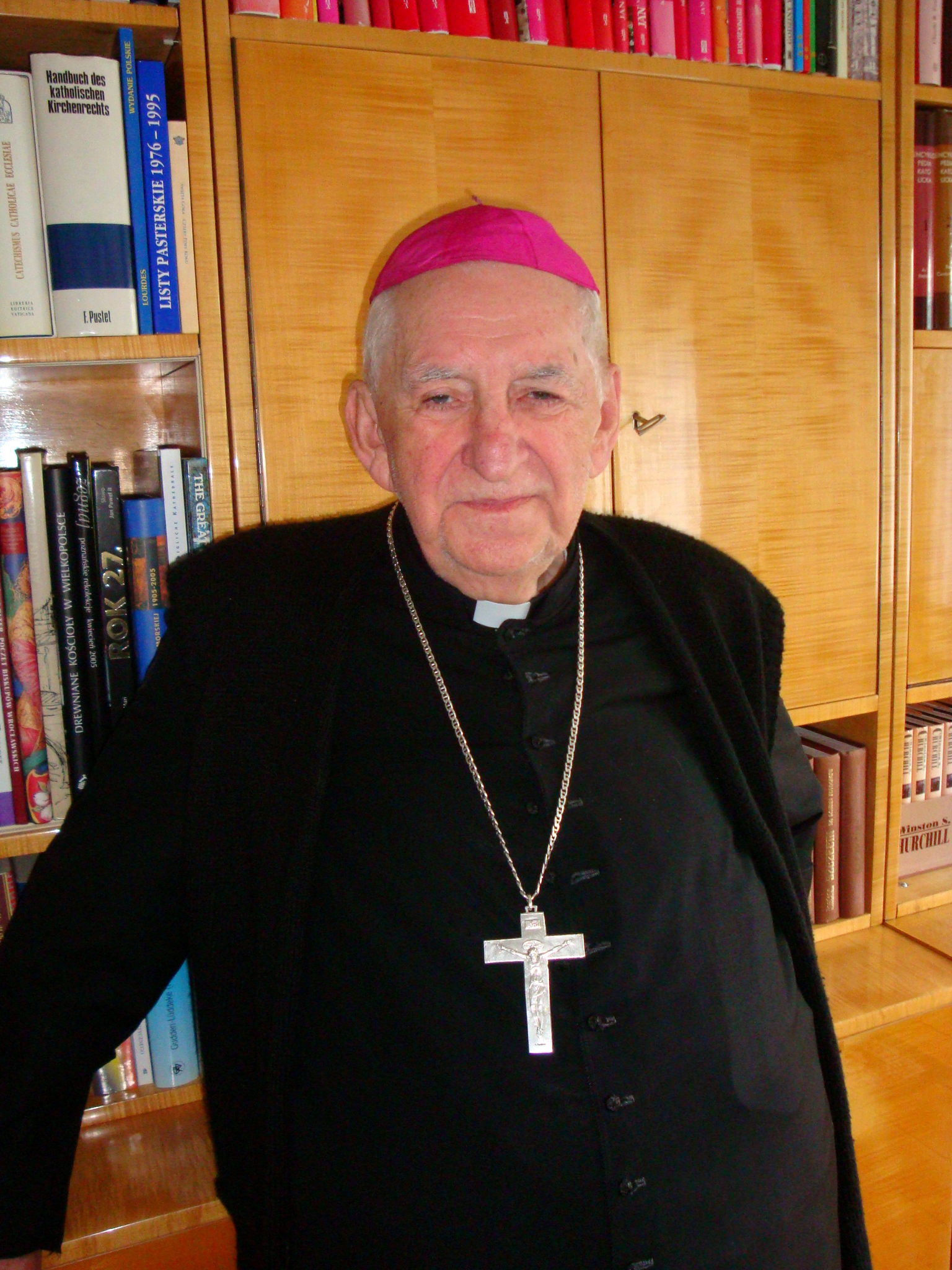
Marian Przykucki, bishop of Chełmno (1981–1992)

In May 2019, the documentary Tell No One claimed amongst other things "that the Polish Church moved known paedophile priests from parish to parish, as happened in other countries." One string of transfers is documented extensively by victims of father Andrzej Srebrzyński, led by Marek Mielewczyk from Kartuzy, who claims to have been sexually abused and raped multiple times by Srebrzyński from the age of 13 until he attempted suicide and was hospitalised in 1987. Treating doctor Irena Drewla wrote a letter to bishop Marian Przykucki of Chełmno, informing him of Srebrzyński's abuse and rape of Mielewczyk. Bishop Przykucki responded on 20 January 1988, writing: 'I am familiar with the case. After the retreat programme, the priest was moved to another place, under the penalty that should this crime repeat, he'll be deprived of the possibility of performing his priestly vocation.' Nothing else was done with Mielewczyk's complaints, who recounts: "Years later, we found out that he was moved to Wejherowo; then to Czerna, a small town close to Czersk; then to Papowo Biskupie; then, much further, to Mszano, close to Brodnica; he was a parish priest there until 2013. Over ten victims of Srebrzyński came to me personally." Although Pope Francis finally defrocked Srebrzyński in 2016 (28 years after the Mielewczyk case was reported), he was seen participating during the June 2017 Lady of Fátima procession in Mogilno in full liturgical garment.

In December 2022, Poland-based Dutch investigative journalist Ekke Overbeek stated in an interview that his 3-year research in Polish archives had revealed evidence that Pope John Paul II during his time as archbishop Karol Wojtyła of Kraków (1962–1978) had known about sexual abuse of minors by priests in at least four cases, but had covered it up. This included cases in which priests who had been convicted for sexual abuse, and had spent time in prison, were again appointed by Wojtyła as priest in another diocese after their release from prison. Overbeek's allegations were challenged by two Polish journalists, Piotr Litka and Tomasz Krzyżak, however, who found that the future pope "did not cover up any abuse and consistently acted against such cases during his time as archbishop of Krakow from 1964 to 1978," having placed sanctions on priests found guilty of the sexual abuse of minors as much as his authority allowed. In the words of the Catholic News Agency: "The journalists said that Wojtyla 'made all the necessary decisions at that moment: the quick removal of the priest from the parish, the suspension until the matter was resolved, and the obligation to live in a monastery,' where civil authorities then arrested him." Litka and Krzyżak note that one of the priests mentioned by Overbeek, Eugeniusz Surgent, was from the Diocese of Lubaczów and not the Archdiocese of Krakow and therefore Wojtyła could have no influence on the fact that he was transferred to another diocese.

=== Switzerland ===
In January 2018, a group of victims came forward in the Canton of Valais, saying they represented about 50 victims of sexual abuse, and accusing around 10 Catholic priests (3 of whom were still alive) in the Diocese of Sion. One victim claimed that "previous bishops had known about the sexual abuse but had done nothing except move some priests to other parishes." Bishop Jean-Marie Lovey responded by admitting priests were moved to other parishes "as a preventive measure", but denying that attempts were made to cover up the sexual abuse.

=== United Kingdom ===
James Robinson worked in parishes in the English Midlands and when an accusation of child abuse happened in the 1980s, the Roman Catholic Church allowed him to escape to the United States though they knew about an "unwholesome relationship" the priest had with a boy. Robinson remained free for over 20 years till in the first decade of the 21st century he was extradited back to the UK to face charges. Robinson has received a 21-year prison sentence for multiple child sex offences. The Roman Catholic Church paid Robinson up to £800 per month despite knowing the allegations against him.

=== United States ===
==== Overview ====
Throughout the second half of the twentieth century, Latin America became something of a dumping ground for U.S. priests suspected of sexual abuse, with Guatemala quickly becoming a particularly attractive destination.

— Kevin Lewis O'Neill, professor at the University of Toronto (2020)

According to the 2004 John Jay Report, three percent of all priests against whom allegations were made were convicted and about two percent received prison sentences."

Instead of reporting the incidents to police, many dioceses directed the offending priests to seek psychological treatment and assessment. According to the John Jay Report, nearly 40 percent of priests alleged to have committed sexual abuse participated in treatment programs. The more allegations a priest had, the more likely he was to participate in treatment. From a legal perspective, the most serious criticism aside from the incidents of child sexual abuse themselves was by the bishops, who failed to report accusations to the police.

In response to the failure of many organisations to report abuse to the police, lawmakers have changed the law to make reporting of abuse to police compulsory. In 2002, Massachusetts passed a law requiring religious officials to report the abuse of children.

In response to these allegations, both ecclesiastical and civil authorities have implemented procedures to prevent sexual abuse of minors by clergy and to report and punish it if and when it occurs.

On March 6, 2020, a joint investigation conducted by Propublica and the Houston Chronicle was published which revealed that the Catholic Church transferred more than 50 credibly accused U.S. Catholic clergy to other countries after sex abuse accusations surfaced against them.

==== Archdiocese of Boston ====
In the Archdiocese of Boston, John Geoghan was shifted from one parish to another, although Cardinal Bernard Law (Archbishop of Boston 1984–2002) had been informed of his sexual misconduct on a number of occasions, such as in December 1984 when auxiliary Bishop John M. D'Arcy wrote to Cardinal Law complaining about Geoghan's reassignment to another Boston-area parish because of his "history of homosexual involvement with young boys."

Another example was the case of Joseph Birmingham, who was assigned to a number of parishes over a period of 23 years during which he molested a number of children. In response to a 1987 letter from the mother of an altar boy inquiring as to whether Birmingham had a history of molesting children, Cardinal Law replied, reassuring her that there was "no factual basis" for her concern.

==== Archdiocese of Los Angeles ====
In the Roman Catholic Diocese of Orange, auxiliary bishop Michael Patrick Driscoll (1990–1999) accepted and transferred priests despite reports of sexual misconduct. On 17 May 2005, the Diocese of Orange released over 10,000 pages of documents from the personnel files of 15 priests and teachers as part of a court-approved $100-million settlement reached in December 2004 between the diocese and 90 alleged victims of sexual abuse. The documents showed inter alia that the church has been shuffling priests who mosted children from parish to parish and from diocese to diocese for more than two decades. For example, it transferred one serial molester to the Archdiocese of Tijuana. It also welcomed a convicted child abuser from another state knowing that he was already accused of a new transgression. When the latter was accused yet again, the Diocese sent him to a rehabilitation centre in New Mexico with a notation: 'No one else will take you.' The documents also revealed that bishops in Milwaukee, Baker and Tijuana were complicit in helping the Diocese of Orange shuffle molesting priests around.

==== Archdiocese of Philadelphia ====
The case of Fr. Gerard W. Chambers illustrates the fact, clearly established by evidence before the Grand Jury, that the Philadelphia Archdiocese had a longstanding policy of transferring sexually abusive priests from parish to parish in order to avoid disclosure and scandal--never mind all the children thereby endangered and abused.

— 2005 Grand Jury report

A 2005 Grand Jury report cited evidence that both Cardinal John Krol (Archbishop of Philadelphia 1961–1988) and his successor Cardinal Anthony Bevilacqua (Archbishop of Philadelphia 1988–2003) had allowed dozens of sexually abusive priests to stay in holy orders by transferring them from parish to parish to avoid a scandal. The case of Gerard W. Chambers was cited as exemplary for the archdiocese's 'longstanding policy of transferring sexually abusive priests from parish to parish in order to avoid disclosure and scandal'. In his 21 years of active ministry, the Archdiocese of Philadelphia assigned him to 17 different parishes with full access to children; during nearly half of those years, Chambers was on "health leaves" and in treatment facilities, apparently each time after accusations of sexual abuse of children emerged against him. He was put on permanent health leave in 1963, and died in 1974. After four of Chamber's victims (from his 14th and 15th assignments) came forward to the archdiocese in early 1994, church officials said they had destroyed all of Chambers' personnel records from his ministry career. Nevertheless, based on a list of Chambers' assignments and "health leaves" that the archdiocese still had retained, combined with the testimonies of several of his victims, who named other likely victims of Chambers as well, later allowed investigators to reconstruct the alleged pattern of abuse. The then Secretary of Clergy, Lynn, agreed with the Grand Jury that the victims' allegations of a pattern of repetitive episcopal reassignment of the repeatedly abusive Chambers were "highly possible", and Lynn also agreed with the Grand Jury that 'this pattern of transfer was characteristic of how the Archdiocese treated the problems presented by sexually abusive priests.'

In June 2012, Msgr. William J. Lynn, of the archdiocese of Philadelphia, became the first senior official convicted in the United States for covering up the sexual abuse of children by priests he oversaw. Lynn was convicted of child endangerment for, as the official in charge of handling abuse complaints, reassigning known abusers to new parishes instead of keeping them away from children. He was sentenced to three to six years in prison.

The Grand jury investigation of Catholic Church sexual abuse in Pennsylvania published another report on 14 August 2018. It showed that 301 priests were accused of sexually abusing more than 1,000 children in the six dioceses and were routinely shuffled from parish to parish in order to avoid scrutiny. Senior priests and bishops knowingly reshuffled offenders from parish to parish, allowing them to continue their abuse unchecked.

Amongst other things, the 2018 grand jury report stated that Donald Wuerl, Bishop of Pittsburgh (1988–2006), had a mixed record. On the one hand, Wuerl made contributions to fighting sex abuse, including his successful 1988–1995 effort, against resistance within the Vatican, to remove Anthony Cipolla for sexual abuse. However, Wuerl also allowed, based on the advice of multiple doctors, William O'Malley to return to active ministry in 1998, despite past allegations of abuse, and the fact that O'Malley had admitted that he was sexually interested in adolescents. The report also stated that Wuerl had allowed Ernest Paone to be transferred to the Diocese of Reno in 1991, despite a history of accusations of child abuse dating back to the early 1960s. Wuerl, who had been promoted to Archbishop of Washington in 2006, initially rejected calls to resign following the report; nevertheless, after mounting pressure, he tendered his resignation to Pope Francis, who accepted it on 12 October 2018.

==== Archdiocese of San Francisco ====
Oliver O'Grady served in at least five parishes in the Diocese of Stockton during the 1970s and 1980s as he molested dozens of children. His abuse and Cardinal Roger Mahony's attempts to hide the crimes are the subject of Amy J. Berg's 2006 documentary film Deliver Us from Evil.

==== Archdiocese of Washington ====
According to a Vatican report published on 10 November 2020, Pope John Paul II appointed archbishop of Newark Theodore McCarrick to archbishop of Washington, D.C., in November 2000 and promoted him to cardinal in 2001, even though he had received warnings in 1999 that McCarrick was rumoured to have committed sexual misconduct with underage boys in seminaries in the 1980s. Although John Paul did open an investigation that "confirmed that McCarrick had shared a bed with young men", it could not confirm whether sexual acts had taken place. The pope decided to believe McCarrick's August 2000 written denial, and moved on with the planned promotions. After Pope Benedict XVI succeeded John Paul in 2005, more information about McCarrick's sexual assaults came to light and he was pressured to resign, which Benedict accepted in 2006, but he kept his status as a priest. After taking office in 2013, Pope Francis was informed about the accusations against McCarrick, but initially deemed them to have already been adequately dealt with by Benedict. Francis did not act until in 2017 an altar boy came forward saying McCarrick had groped him in the 1970s, prompting the pope to launch a canonical trial in October 2018. In 2019, the Vatican found McCarrick guilty of sexual crimes in the 1970 and 1980s "with the aggravating factor of the abuse of power," and defrocked him. The 2020 report blamed all three successive popes for doing too little to address the allegations, although Francis was largely absolved from the blame by ultimately properly finishing the matter.

== Vatican policy ==
In the book version of his 2019 film The Two Popes, New Zealand journalist and filmmaker Anthony McCarten described the Vatican's policy during the tenures of Pope John Paul II (1978–2005) and Joseph Ratzinger as Prefect of the Congregation for the Doctrine of the Faith (1981–2005) as follows: 'Rather than excommunicating and bringing to justice those accused after an open investigation, the Vatican refused to divulge information to aid criminal investigations, blocked several internal inquiries, and in countless cases moved priests accused of abuse to new parishes or quietly reinstated those who had been forced by bishops to stand down from their positions.'

On 10 November 2020, the Vatican published a report which found that John Paul II learned of allegations of sexual impropriety against former cardinal Theodore McCarrick, who at the time was serving as Archbishop of Newark, through a 1999 letter from Cardinal John O'Connor warning him that appointing McCarrick to be Archbishop of Washington D.C., a position which had recently been opened, would be a mistake. John Paul II ordered an investigation, which stalled when three of the four bishops tasked with investigating claims allegedly brought back "inaccurate or incomplete information." John Paul II planned on not giving McCarrick the appointment anyway, but relented and gave him the appointment after McCarrick wrote a letter of denial. He created McCarrick a cardinal in 2001. McCarrick would eventually be laicized after allegations surfaced that he abused minors.

== Catholic Church position ==
=== "Best medical advice available at the time" ===
Defenders of the Church's actions have suggested that in reassigning priests after treatment, bishops were acting on the best medical advice then available, a policy also followed by the US public school system when dealing with accused teachers. Some bishops and psychiatrists have asserted that the prevailing psychology of the times suggested that people could be cured of such behavior through existing counseling. Many of the abusive priests had received counseling before being reassigned.

=== Responses to criticism ===
In response to criticism that the Catholic hierarchy should have acted more quickly and decisively to remove priests accused of sexual misconduct, contemporary bishops have responded that the hierarchy was unaware until recent years of the danger in shuffling priests from one parish to another and in concealing the priests' problems from those they served. For example, Cardinal Roger Mahony of the Archdiocese of Los Angeles, said: "We have said repeatedly that ... our understanding of this problem and the way it's dealt with today evolved, and that in those years ago, decades ago, people didn't realize how serious this was, and so, rather than pulling people out of ministry directly and fully, they were moved."

== See also ==
- Crimen sollicitationis
- Gypsy cop, a similar practice within the police corps
- Priest hole

== Literature ==
- Bright, Gwendolyn N. (2011). Grand Jury Report on the Sexual Abuse of Minors by Clergy (2005) [2011 reprint]. DIANE Publishing. p. 418. ISBN 9781437981520.
