= Wandering officer =

Police officer who frequently transfers between police departments

In law enforcement in the United States, a wandering officer, referred to colloquially as a gypsy cop, is a police officer who frequently transfers between police departments, with a record of misconduct or unsuitable job performance.

== History ==
In use since the 1980s, the phrase "gypsy cop" entered public parlance in the 2000s after the infamous Tulia drug stings, where itinerant lawman Tom Coleman allegedly set up innocent people, most of them Black, as part of a long-term undercover operation. Gypsy comes from stereotypes about the Romani people, sometimes known as "gypsies," who are stereotypically said to always travel and thus never settle down in a local community. Some dictionaries recommend against using the word gypsy as a modifier with negative connotations because it is a slur used against the Romani people.

Several other high-profile cases include those in Texas and Alaska that involved officers who served with adversity in close to 20 agencies in 15 years or less, evading administrative action despite blatant misconduct and compelling signs of unsuitability to serve as peace officers. They evaded administrative action by going from agency to agency, sometimes serving as little as 30 days at one department.

In 2016, following a civil rights lawsuit against Ferguson police officer Freddie Boyd, he was found to have had a string of complaints filed against him from over 10 years earlier when he was working for the city of St. Louis. Complaints against Boyd included pistol-whipping a child and falsifying police reports. Issues with police officers who frequently transfer between police departments, with a record of misconduct or unsuitable job performance, were written about widely in the 2010s, although the term gypsy cop tended to be avoided.

Further studies and reports were published in the 2020s, typically using the term "wandering officer".

== Causes ==
=== Fragmentation ===
Law enforcement in the United States is decentralized, with approximately 18,000 agencies operating under separate regulatory frameworks in each state and territory. Hiring and disciplinary standards vary among departments, and there is no national database of dismissed officers or uniform process for decertification. Some states maintain their own databases or have adopted administrative measures intended to prevent dismissed officers from being rehired, but these systems are not centralized and lack uniform standards. Because of the country's size and the number of agencies, an officer dismissed by one department may be hired by another in a distant jurisdiction without the new employer becoming aware of the prior dismissal.

=== Incentives for hiring ===
Wandering officers typically move between agencies as lateral transfers, meaning officers who have already completed training and certification. Such candidates are often preferred over new recruits because the hiring process is shorter and less costly. Some agencies hire wandering officers despite knowledge of their prior dismissals, citing recruitment difficulties associated with smaller applicant pools, lower pay, limited training and advancement opportunities, and reduced prestige. In agencies with fewer than ten officers, a single vacancy can strain the department's ability to provide continuous coverage, creating pressure to fill the position quickly.

=== Incentives for concealing a misconduct dismissal ===
Problem officers are often allowed to resign in seemingly good standing and then go to another unsuspecting agency with a good recommendation from a previous chief or sheriff, who is eager to get rid of the problem officer. In other cases, small agencies with limited budgets may fear a costly lawsuit if they dismiss an officer through a formal disciplinary process. An officer who is facing a misconduct dismissal will often threaten the agency and its governmental entity with costly, lengthy, and unflattering litigation for wrongful discipline or wrongful unfit or adverse termination and make such claims public.

Attempts to report problem officers by agencies can be overruled and overturned by administrative law hearings and actions. Such a ruling can be interpreted as a rebuke of the agency and can be a basis for the officer to litigate against the reporting agency. Fear of this potential outcome is also a factor in many agency heads simply taking the path of least resistance and giving a separating officer a positive report of separation.

Most states have a consolidated retirement system for state, county and municipal peace officers, which is unaffected by transfers between agencies so long as continued employment occurs and can thus further provide incentive for both good and bad officers to move frequently between agencies.

== See also ==
- Job rotation
- Parish transfers of abusive Catholic priests
- Police accountability
