= Pavol Hnilica =

Slovak Roman Catholic bishop

The Most Reverend Pavol Mária Hnilica S.J.
- Titular Bishop of Rusadir
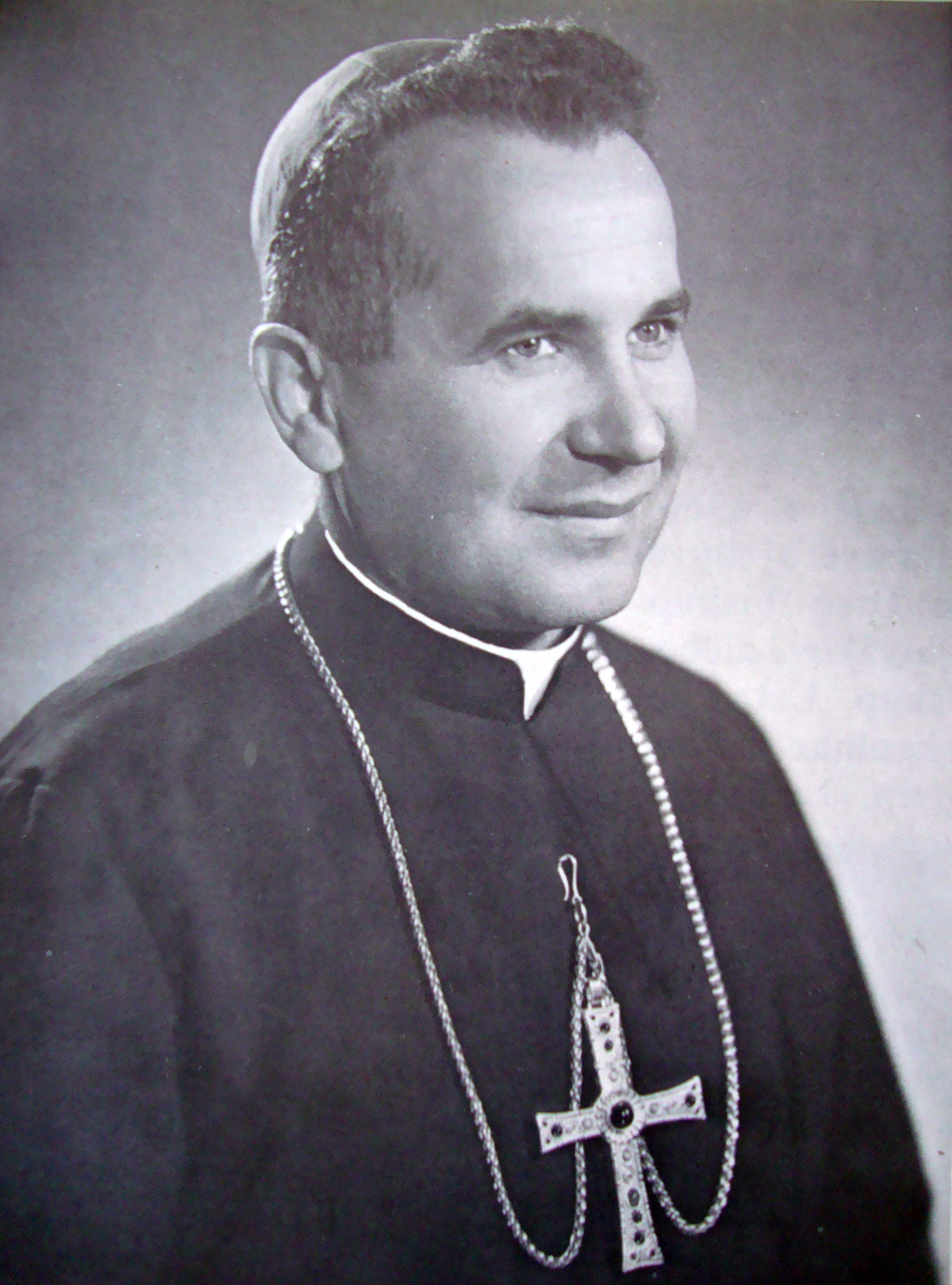
- Church: Catholic Church
- Diocese: Rusadir
- Installed: 13 May 1964
- Term ended: 8 October 2006
- Predecessor: Joseph Howard Hodges
- Successor: Pascal Wintzer

Orders
- Ordination: 29 September 1950 by Robert Pobožný, Bishop of Roznava
- Consecration: 2 January 1951 by Robert Pobožný

Personal details
- Born: 30 March 1921 Uňatín, Czechoslovakia
- Died: 8 October 2006 (aged 85) Nové Hrady, Czech Republic
- Denomination: Catholic

Pavol Mária Hnilica, S.J. (30 March 1921 – 8 October 2006) was a Slovak prelate of the Catholic Church who served as a titular bishop of Rusadir from 1964 until his death in 2006.

Born in Uňatín in present-day Slovakia, Hnilica became a Jesuit priest in 1950, and in 1951 was secretly ordained a bishop during the communist rule in Czechoslovakia. In 1951 he fled the country and settled in Rome, where in 1964 he was appointed the titular bishop of Rusadir. From Rome, he led the Pia Unione Pro Fratribus organisation, later known as Family of Mary. The organisation offered religious support to Catholics in Eastern Europe under Soviet control.

Hnilica was part of a network of Marian apparitions around the world. His organization was especially active around the promotion of the cult of the Lady of All Nations in the Netherlands. Presently Bishop Hendriks explains that the title 'Lady of All Nations' is "in itself theologically admissible" which includes praying with the Madonna but it is not to be understood as a recognition of the supernatural nature of the phenomena.

After the Bosnian War disrupted his activity in Medjugorje, Hnilica turned to the United States, where he tried to create a similar Marian cult in Denver, an unsuccessful endeavour shut down by the local bishop. A supporter of the Medjugorje apparitions, Hnilica also became active supporting marian apparitions. He claimed to have been the Pope's personal delegate and that the Pope privately supports the apparitions. The local diocese, as well as the Vatican, declared the claims to be false.

In 1992, Hnilica tried to retrieve stolen documents from Roberto Calvi regarding the collapse of the Banco Ambrosiano of which the Vatican Bank was a partial owner. Flavio Carboni, an associate of Calvi, promised to clear the Vatican Bank of any wrongdoing. Initially Carboni and Hnilica were found guilty but the verdict was annulled for procedural reasons. In the second trial Hnilica was acquitted because the court found that he acted under duress.

== Biography ==
Hnilica was born in 1921 in Uňatín, Czechoslovakia in the Archdiocese of Travni. Hnilica began his theological studies in Slovakia and during this time, the communists, who took control of the government after World War II, shut down the religious orders from April 1950. David Doellinger wrote that they transported the clergy, including students from orders in Slovakia to monasteries that had been turned into concentration camps. During his internment in a concentration camp in communist Slovakia, he was forced to continue his theological studies in secret. On 29 September 1950 he was secretly ordained as a priest and was secretly consecrated as a bishop three months later on 2 January 1951.

He, along with Ján Chryzostom Korec, was released early for health reasons. In October 1950 he helped Korec become secretly ordained as a priest by a Slovak bishop who had not been arrested. David Doellinger wrote that Korec was then able to "secretly train and ordain men for the priesthood who could not study at the theological seminary." In July 1951, the communists issued a warrant for Hnilica's arrest, so he started making plans to leave the country. The authorities discovered he was working as a clandestine bishop. On 24 August 1951, Bishop Hnilica secretly consecrated Korec as bishop before he left the country, that December, by jumping in the Danube river swimming to freedom in the West.

Hnilica's activities were of particular interest to the Czechoslovak State Security as the regime was hostile towards the Catholic Church. On 13 May 1964 Pope Paul VI appointed Hnilica as the titular bishop of Rusadir. In 1968, at the request from Pope Paul VI, he founded the Pia Unione Pro Fratribus, now known as the Family of Mary. The organization is dedicated to providing material and spiritual help to the churches of Eastern Europe persecuted by the communists. From this organisation, a couple of religious orders blossomed forth.

According to historian Emilia Hrabovec, his contacts with the Holy See ended in 1971 over differences concerning the Vatican's policies towards Czechoslovakia. According to Paul Kengor he was "persecuted by the Czech communist regime, Hnilica was forced to live in exile in Rome. He was close to John Paul II, a fellow Slav, and to Sister Lucia (of Fatima) and Saint Mother Teresa as well." John Paul II never doubted Hnilica and his work. In fact, the two men had a close friendship for many years. David Yallop wrote that "Hnilica was even accorded the rare privilege of concelebrating Mass with the Holy Father in the Papal chapel." After the mass, he and the Holy father had breakfast together. According to David Yallop, Hnilica recounted:

I said unto him. "Holy Father, only you have a bigger diocese. It comprises the whole world. Mine comes right after that size. Peking-Moscow-Berlin." The Pope said, "This is your mission field. Find yourself the best Christians as Missionaries!"

== Our Lady of Fatima ==
Hnilica met Sister Lucia of Fatima in 1982. On March 25, 1984, Pope John Paul II endeavored to completely accomplish what Our Lady of Fatima had requested seven decades earlier in 1917. She asked that Russia be consecrated to her Immaculate Heart to be done in "full communion and coordination with the world's bishops." According to Sister Lucia, the previous attempts were incomplete. On December 8, 1983, on the Feast of the Immaculate Conception John Paul II sent out a letter four months ahead of the planned date of 25 March 1984, to all the bishops worldwide. The site of the consecration was to be at St. Peter's Square in front of a statue of Our Lady of Fatima brought from Fatima, Portugal. Bishops around the world were to say the consecration prayer in their home parish at the same time. This also extended to the Kremlin but there were no bishops there. So Bishop Hnilica and Monsignor Maasburg, the spiritual advisor to Saint Mother Teresa, went to the Soviet Union to execute John Paul II's prayer of consecration inside the Kremlin itself. Mother Teresa gave them medals with Mary's image to be left there. Religious articles are strictly forbidden in the USSR and they had to get hundreds of Miraculous Medals by security. Sometimes they used the medals to convince custom agents and inspectors to allow them to pass. At the embassy, they were invited to join a group of diplomats on a tour of churches on the Kremlin grounds. They went straight to the church dedicated to the Annunciation of the Virgin Mary. Hnilica using a copy of Pravda to hide the consecration prayer, successfully pulled off the consecration in harmony with John Paul.

== World network of Marian devotion ==
Hnilica led a web of contested Marian movements and was their central figure. When John Paul II was pope (1978-2005), the world network of Marian devotion was already in existence. According to Gordon Melton and Marin Baumann during this time the "formalization of the devotions of some highly controversial figures" like Padre Pio and "while previously 'banned' sites of apparitions" like Lady of All Nations "received positive toleration or at least a level of acknowledgment." Important shrines and devotions within this network include naming a few: Amsterdam, Netherlands (1945), Fatima, Portugal (1917), Garabandal, Spain (1961) and Medjugorje, Bosnia and Herzegovina (1981). There were a number of organizations and individual priests, fathers, and titular bishops, like Hnilica, supporting the Marian network. He and several other clerics, created an important connection between several Marian apparitions around the world at that time. His missionary family & journal promoted the cult of The Lady of All Nations. The current Bishop Hendriks explains that the title ‘Lady of All Nations’ is “in itself theologically admissible” which includes praying with the Madonna but it is not to be understood as a recognition of the supernatural nature of the phenomena.

== Our Lady of Medjugorje ==
A supporter of the alleged Our Lady of Medjugorje apparitions, he visited Medjugorje several times. According to Chris Maunder, Hnilica "was said to have the ear of John Paul II, and he reported that "the Pope is privately interested in Medjugorje, seeing it as a continuation of Fatima in the battle with communism." According to the journalist Yallop, "John Paul II and Hnilica enjoyed a close friendship for many years." In 1990 John Paul II dispatched his confidante, Bishop Hnilica, to accompany Marija, a seer of Our Lady of Medjugorje, on a visit to Russia.

Hnilica was a member of the "Queen of Peace" Committee, along with other supporters of the Medjugorje apparitions: Msgr. Dr. Frane Franić, retired Archbishop of Split and Makarska, Father Tomislav Pervan, Father Ivan Landeka, Father Slavko Barbarić, Father Jozo Zovko and Father Leonard Oreč.

Chris Maunder believes that Hnilica's support for Medjugorje was a burden because of his involvement with the Vatican Bank scandal from the 1980s of which he was acquitted.

It was correctly stated by Kutleša that in March 1994, while in Mostar, Hnilica falsely presented himself as the Pope's personal delegate and attributed statements to Pope John Paul II supportive of Medjugorje, which were dismissed as false by the Vatican.

The Bosnian War caused the decline in the financial revenues in Medjugorje, so Hnilica wanted to find a new source of financing. Hnilica tried to create the "Medjugorje of America" by contacting Theresa Lopez, an alleged seer of Mary, mother of Jesus. Lopez claimed that she had a vision of the Madonna at the Mother Cabrini shrine near Denver, Colorado. Hnilica met with Lopez in May 1992, and she regularly claimed to have visions of the Madonna. They started touring and raised some $50 million annually. However, Hnilica's and Lopez's project ended with the Archbishop of Denver James Stafford's pronouncement that the visions are not supernatural in origin. Stafford formed a commission to investigate the alleged apparitions, and the commission presented him with results in February 1994. On March 9, 1994, Archbishop Stafford issued the following declaration: "On December 9, 1991, I appointed a commission to investigate alleged apparitions of the Blessed Virgin Mary at Mother Cabrini Shrine and other places within the Archdiocese of Denver to Theresa Antonia Lopez. On February 22, 1994, the commission completed its investigation and presented its findings to me. As Archbishop of Denver, I have concluded that the alleged apparitions of the Blessed Virgin Mary to Theresa Antonia Lopez are devoid of any supernatural origin."

== Criminal investigation ==
In 1992, Hnilica was indicted for criminal involvement in the case of the collapse of the Banco Ambrosiano, of which the Vatican Bank was a partial owner. The investigators found Hnilica's2.8 million USD checks from Hnilica's Vatican Bank account. At first, Hnilica claimed that he didn't want anything from Roberto Calvi's briefcase, but was hoping that Carboni would launch a campaign that would improve the Vatican's image. Carboni was the last to see Calvi alive and hoped to get four million dollars for the briefcase. He told Hnilica that the documents in the briefcase would clear the Vatican Bank of any wrongdoing. Pope John Paul II and the secretary of state Cardinal Casaroli authorized Hnilica to negotiate. Hnilica then said he was hoping he would get the documents in the briefcase and that it would clear the Vatican Bank in the event of Banco Ambrosiano collapse. Carboni, Hnilica, and Lena were all found guilty in March 1993, with Carboni receiving five, Hnilica three, and Lena two and a half years in prison. All three verdicts were later annulled by the Appeals Court due to an error in procedure.

The second trial took place in March 2000, where Carboni and Lena were convicted, and Hnilica was acquitted. According to Yallop, the court determined that the Vatican had reneged on the deal and failed to produce the money so Hnilica was not able to take possession of Calvi's documents and the court ruled that Hnilica acted under duress.

== Notes ==
Catholic Church titles
Preceded by Joseph Howard Hodges	Titular Bishop of Rusadir; 1964–2006	Succeeded by Pascal Wintzer
