= Stará Halič =

Stará Halič Vatikán
- Municipality
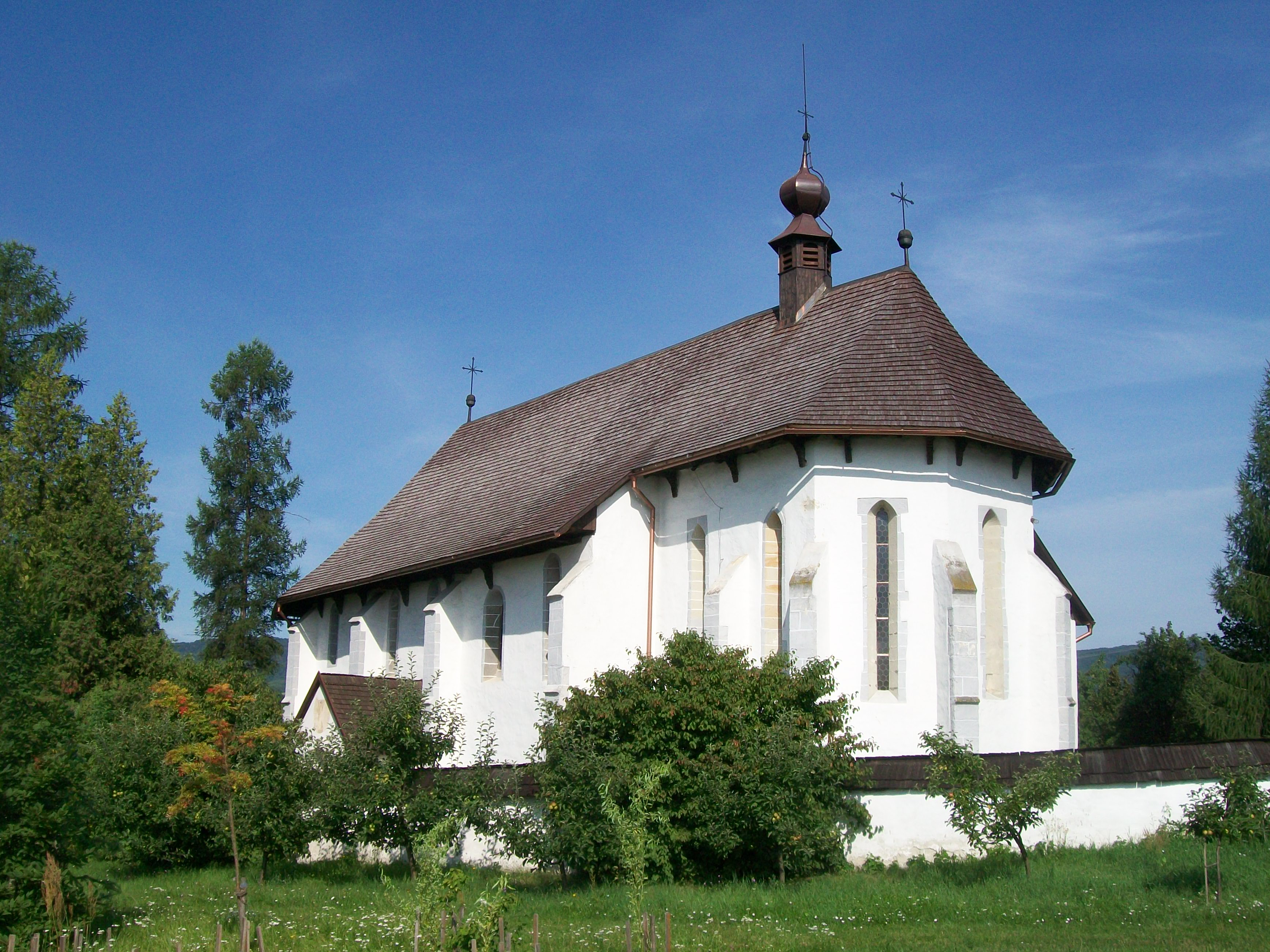
- Roman Catholic Church of St. George

- Flag

- Location of Stará Halič in the Banská Bystrica Region Location of Stará Halič in Slovakia
- Coordinates: 48.37°N 19.57°E
- Country: Slovakia
- Region: Banská Bystrica Region
- District: Lučenec District
- First mentioned: 1350

Area
  - Total: 17.59 km^{2} (6.79 sq mi)
- Elevation: 251 m (823 ft)

Population (2025)
  - Total: 658
- Time zone: UTC+1 (CET)
  - Summer (DST): UTC+2 (CEST)
- Postal code: 985 11
- Area code: +421 47
- Vehicle registration plate (until 2022): LC
- Website: www.starahalic.sk

Stará Halič (Hungarian: Gácsfalu) is a village and municipality in the Lučenec District in the Banská Bystrica Region of Slovakia.

== Geography ==
The municipality lies at an altitude of 251 metres (823 ft) and covers an area of 17.59 km^{2} (6.79 sq mi) (2025).

== Population ==
Population statistic (10 years)
Year	1995	2005	2015	2025
Count	620	662	687	658
Difference		+6.77%	+3.77%	−4.22%

Population statistic
Year	2024	2025
Count	662	658
Difference		−0.60%

It has a population of 658 people (31 December 2025).

=== Ethnicity ===
Census 2021 (1+ %)
Ethnicity	Number	Fraction
Slovak	579	90.75%
Not found out	31	4.85%
German	11	1.72%
Other	11	1.72%
Austrian	7	1.09%
Total	638	

In year 2021 was 638 people by ethnicity 579 as Slovak, 31 as Not found out, 11 as German, 11 as Other, 7 as Austrian, 5 as Hungarian, 1 as Irish, 1 as Ukrainian, 1 as Romani, 1 as Rusyn, 1 as Russian and 1 as Korean.

Note on population: The difference values of population numbers in the table "Population statistic" and in the sections "Ethnicity" & "Religion" is caused by the use of various statistical methods.

=== Religion ===
Census 2021 (1+ %)
Religion	Number	Fraction
Roman Catholic Church	499	78.21%
None	87	13.64%
Not found out	27	4.23%
Evangelical Church	15	2.35%
Total	638	

In year 2021 was 638 people by religion 499 from Roman Catholic Church, 87 from None, 27 from Not found out, 15 from Evangelical Church, 4 from Greek Catholic Church, 2 from Paganism and natural spirituality, 2 from Christian Congregations in Slovakia, 1 from Other and 1 from Hinduism.
