= Uňatín =

Uňatín Unyad
- Municipality
- Flag

- Location of Uňatín in the Banská Bystrica Region Location of Uňatín in Slovakia
- Coordinates: 48.30°N 19.07°E
- Country: Slovakia
- Region: Banská Bystrica Region
- District: Krupina District
- First mentioned: 1311

Area
  - Total: 12.99 km^{2} (5.02 sq mi)
- Elevation: 304 m (997 ft)

Population (2025)
  - Total: 175
- Time zone: UTC+1 (CET)
  - Summer (DST): UTC+2 (CEST)
- Postal code: 962 41
- Area code: +421 45
- Vehicle registration plate (until 2022): KA
- Website: unatin.sk

Uňatín (Hungarian: Unyad) is a village and municipality in the Krupina District of the Banská Bystrica Region of Slovakia.

== Geography ==
The municipality lies at an altitude of 304 metres (997 ft) and covers an area of 12.99 km^{2} (5.02 sq mi) (2025).

== Population ==
Population statistic (10 years)
Year	1995	2005	2015	2025
Count	213	196	180	175
Difference		−7.98%	−8.16%	−2.77%

Population statistic
Year	2024	2025
Count	175	175
Difference		+0%

It has a population of 175 people (31 December 2025).

=== Ethnicity ===
Census 2021 (1+ %)
Ethnicity	Number	Fraction
Slovak	168	94.91%
Not found out	6	3.38%
Czech	3	1.69%
Other	2	1.12%
Total	177	

In year 2021 was 177 people by ethnicity 168 as Slovak, 6 as Not found out, 3 as Czech, 2 as Other, 1 as Italian and 1 as German.

Note on population: The difference values of population numbers in the table "Population statistic" and in the sections "Ethnicity" & "Religion" is caused by the use of various statistical methods.

=== Religion ===
Census 2021 (1+ %)
Religion	Number	Fraction
Roman Catholic Church	152	85.88%
None	11	6.21%
Not found out	6	3.39%
Seventh-day Adventist Church	3	1.69%
Evangelical Church	2	1.13%
Total	177	

In year 2021 was 177 people by religion 152 from Roman Catholic Church, 11 from None, 6 from Not found out, 3 from Seventh-day Adventist Church, 2 from Evangelical Church, 1 from Calvinist Church, 1 from Other and not ascertained christian church and 1 from Ad hoc movements.
