= Ekke Overbeek =

Dutch journalist, correspondent, and non-fiction writer (born 1970)

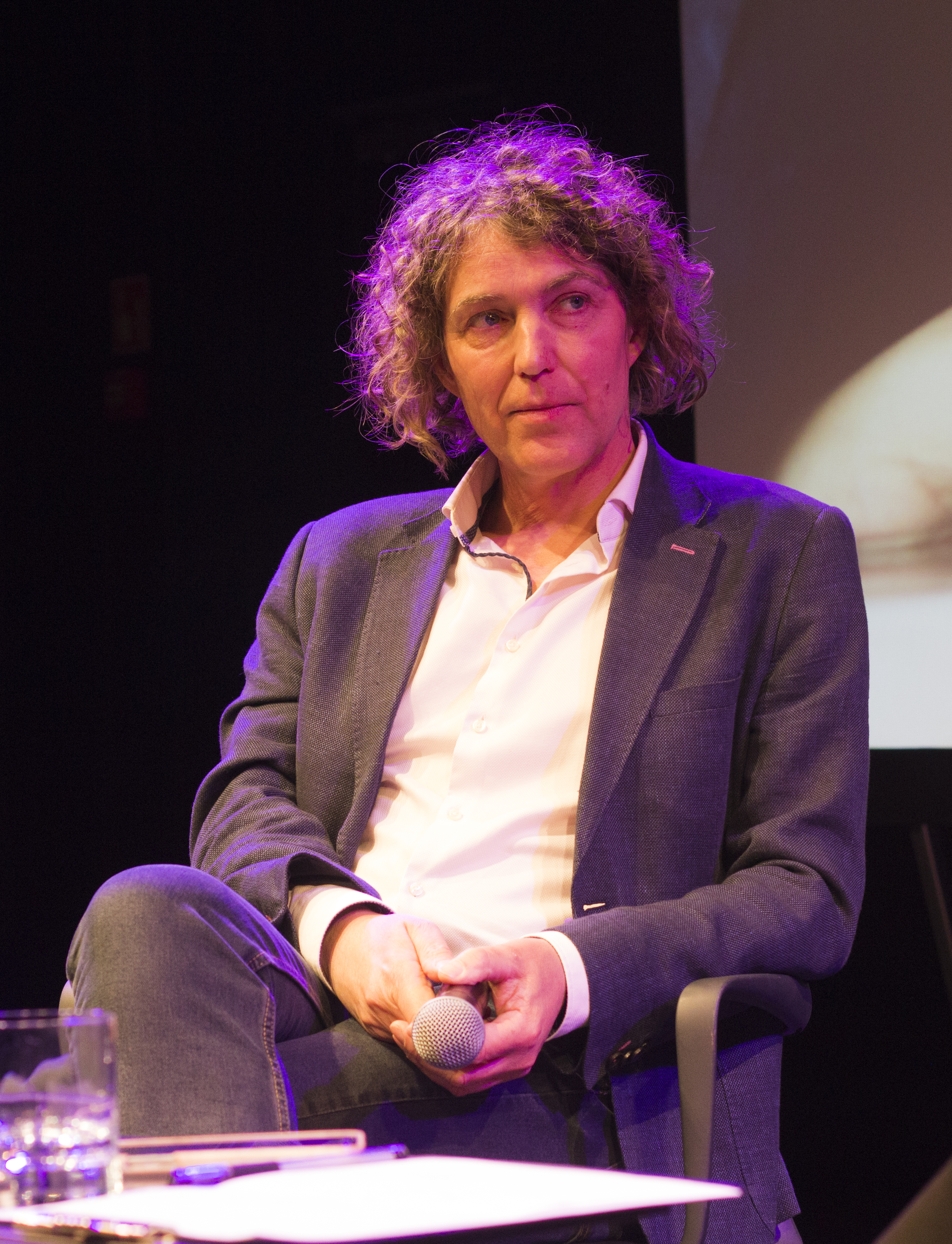
- Ekke Overbeek, 2023
- Born: 22 September 1970 (age 55)
- Citizenship: Dutch
- Occupations: journalist, nonfiction writer

Ekke Bernard Overbeek (born 22 September 1970) is a Dutch journalist and nonfiction writer living in Poland. He has published extensively on sexual abuse in the Catholic Church, including the book Maxima culpa. John Paul II knew (2023), which sparked a wide-ranging debate in Poland.

== Biography ==
Since 1999, Overbeek has worked as a correspondent for the daily newspapers Trouw, De Tijd, and other Dutch media in Central Europe. He has published in Polish, including in OKO.press. As a journalist, he has also covered cases of anti-Semitism and Russophobia in Poland. He has also investigated sexual abuse in the Polish Church and collaborated with Marek Lisiński, president of the “Nie lękajcie się” (Do not be afraid) Foundation.

He co-created the film Silence in the Shadow of John Paul II (2013), the first film about child sexual abuse in the Polish Church. He appeared in Marcin Gutowski's television broadcast Franciszkańska 3 about John Paul II's knowledge of the child sexual abuse in the Catholic Church.

His book Maxima culpa. John Paul II knew (2023) about John Paul II's knowledge of sexual abuse of children and young people in the Catholic Church sparked a debate in Poland. In a number of media publications, including in Telewizja Polska; as well as historians Karol Nawrocki (president of the Institute of National Remembrance), Marek Lasota (director of the Home Army Museum), Rafał Łatka, Paweł Skibiński, Vatican expert Michał Kłosowski, and bishops Grzegorz Ryś, Wacław Depo, Marek Jędraszewski and Cardinal Konrad Krajewski accused Overbeek of unreliability, methodological errors, falsehood, and reliance on documents produced by the Security Service. Journalists Tomasz Krzyżak and Piotr Litka stated in Rzeczpospolita journal that, based on documents collected by the Institute of National Remembrance, John Paul II cannot be accused of intentionally covering for pedophiles while he was Archbishop of the Archdiocese of Kraków. Overbeek's publication was also critically acclaimed in the Dutch Christian daily Nederlands Dagblad.

Overbeek refuted these allegations, claiming that the materials produced by the Security Service constitute the main archival resources of the Institute of National Remembrance and are source material for historical research. Due to the public sentiment surrounding the Oveerbek's publication, a planned author meeting with Overbeek in Kraków for March 2023 was canceled by the organizers due to security concerns. The author's meeting in Krakow took place in the second half of May 2023. For his publication about John Paul II, Overbeek received the title of “Hiena Roku 2023” (“Hyena of the year”) from the Association of Polish Journalists, awarded for “particular dishonesty and disregard for the principles of journalistic ethics”. The book Maxima Culpa was recommended in the Polish edition of Forbes Women by Katarzyna Janowska and Kinga Sabak. In the opinion of Paweł Sękowski, Overbeek “did a great job” with his book.

== Books ==
- Lękajcie się; ofiary pedofilii w polskim kościele mówią. Czarna Owca, 2013.
- Eurotopper Tusk: het nieuwe Polen in Europa. Uitgeverij Conserve, 2015.
- Maxima culpa. Jan Paweł II wiedział. Agora SA, Nisza, 2023.

== Filmography ==
- Silence in the Shadow of John Paul II (2013)
