= Gartnanoul =

Megalithic tomb in County Cavan, Ireland

- Gort na nAbhall (Irish)
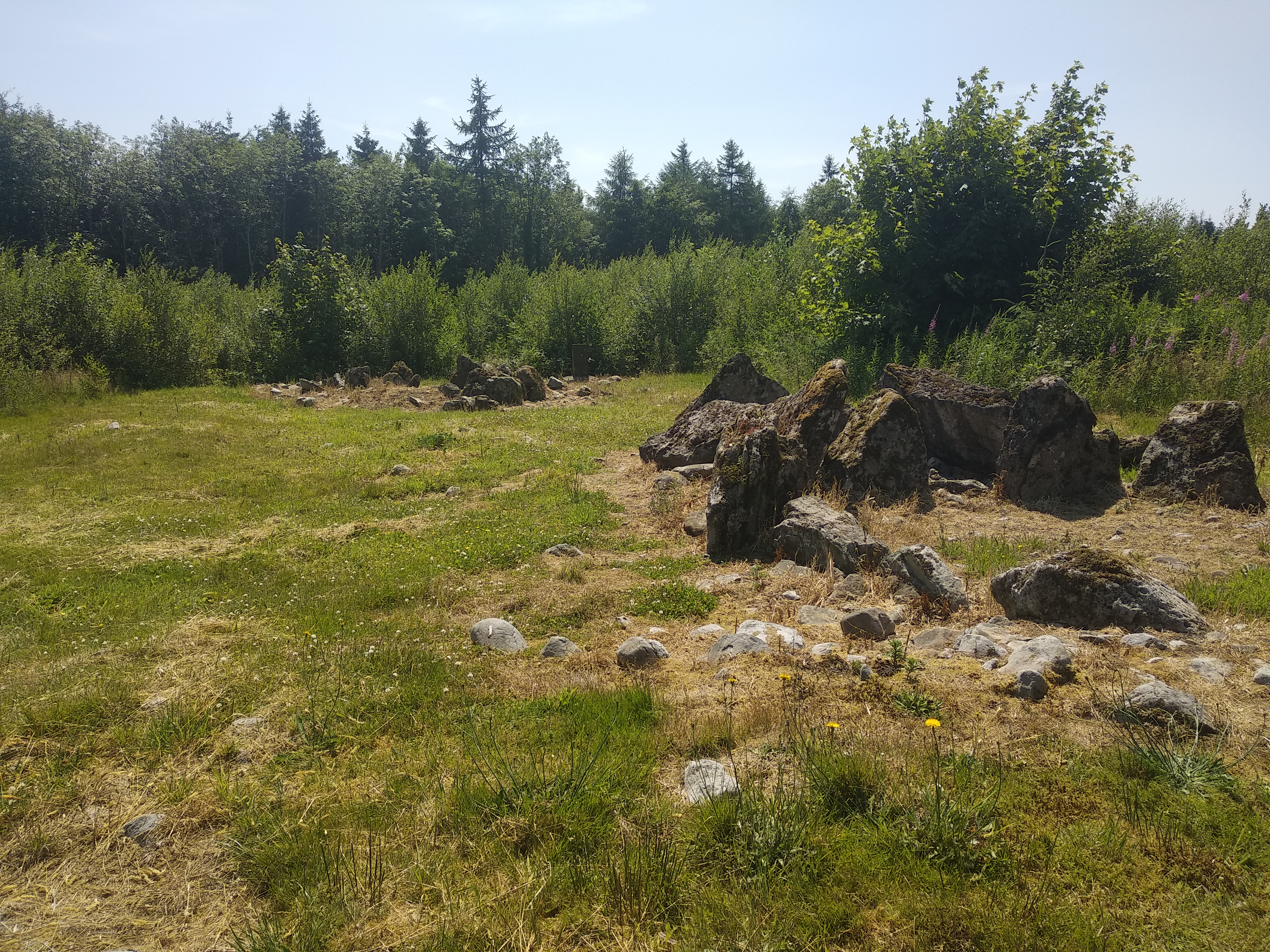

- Location within Ireland
- 54.0108°N 7.4914°W
- Type: Court tomb
- Periods: Megalithic
- Location: Killykeen, County Cavan, Ireland

Site notes
- Material: Stone
- Length: 28 m (92 ft)
- Width: 8 m (26 ft)
- Owner: Public

Designations
- Designation: National Monument

National monument of Ireland
- Official name: Gartnanoul
- Reference no.: 570

Gartnanoul is a megalithic court tomb located in Killykeen Forest Park, Loughtee Upper, County Cavan, Ireland.

Situated near Lough Oughter, the north tomb court is 3 metres (9.8 ft) in depth and 4 metres (13 ft) in width. Gartnanoul is called a dual-tomb because it has two tombs both in line with each other, with each tomb having its own court. It is estimated that when it was built Gartnanoul was 28 metres (92 ft) long and 8 metres (26 ft) wide. The roof stones are missing although the tomb is in good condition and cairn materials are found scattered around the tomb.

== Gallery ==
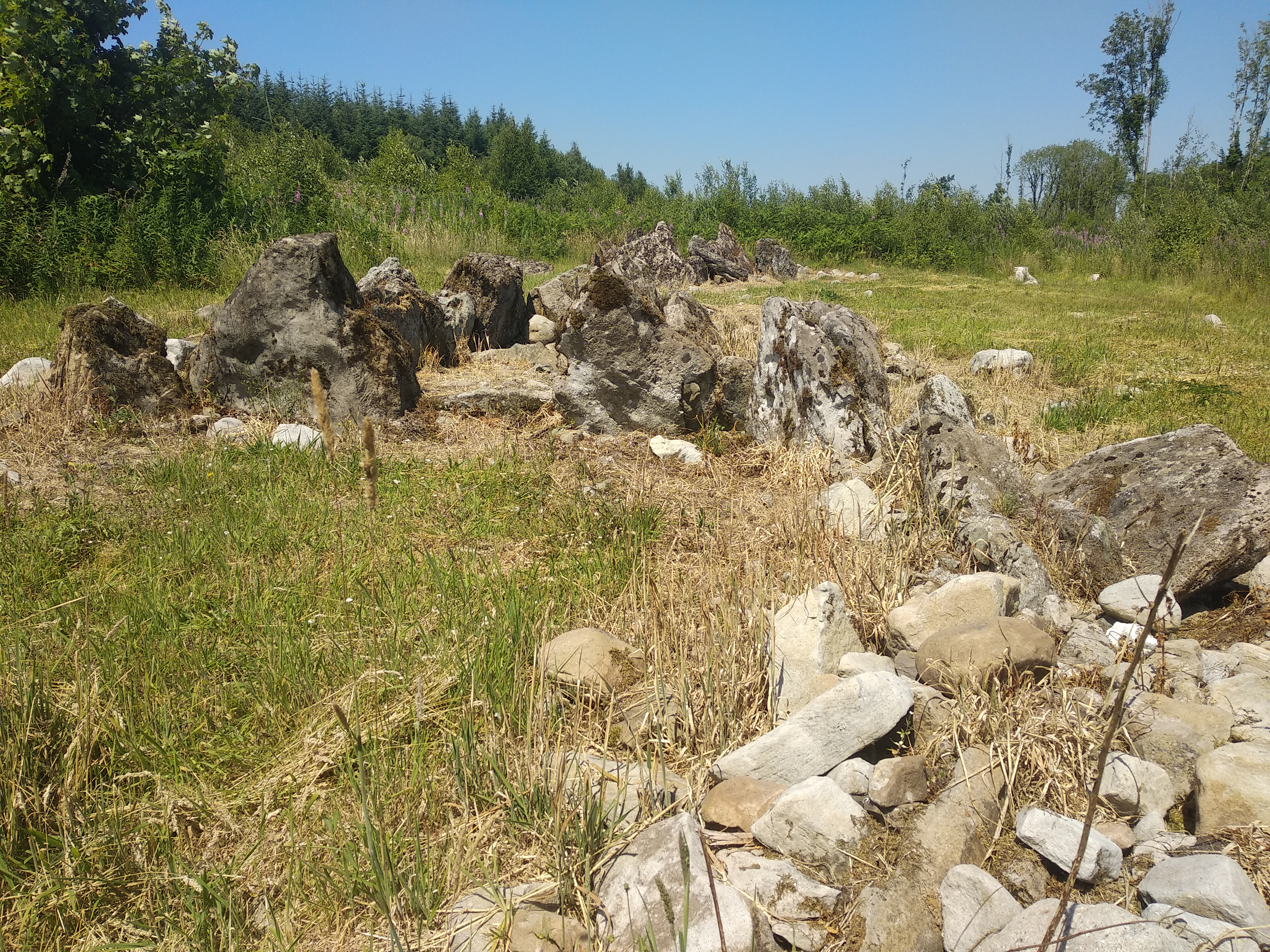
View from the north tomb

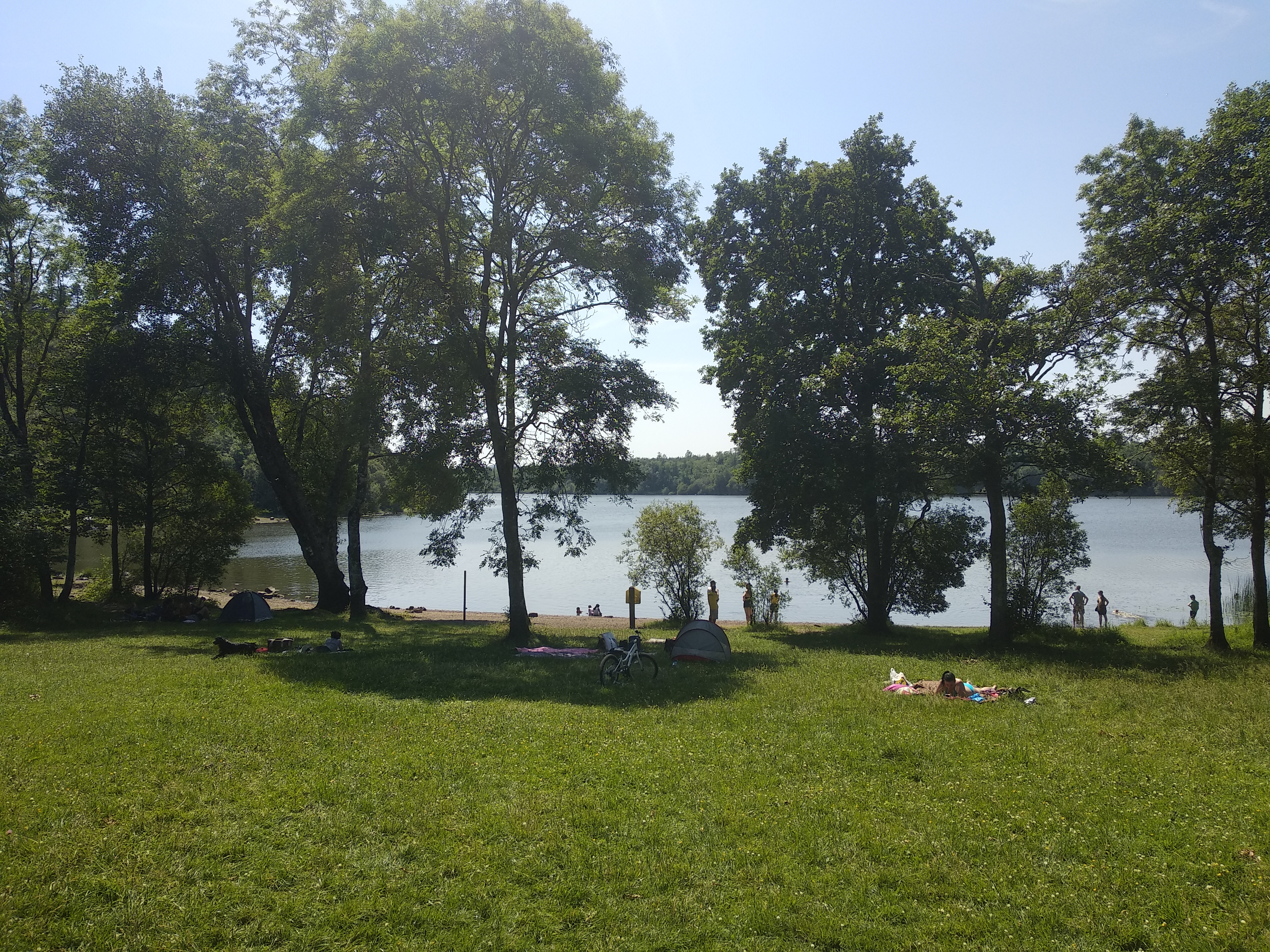
Nearby Lough Oughter
