= Ballinamuck =

Village in County Longford, Ireland

Ballinamuck Béal Átha na Muc
- Village
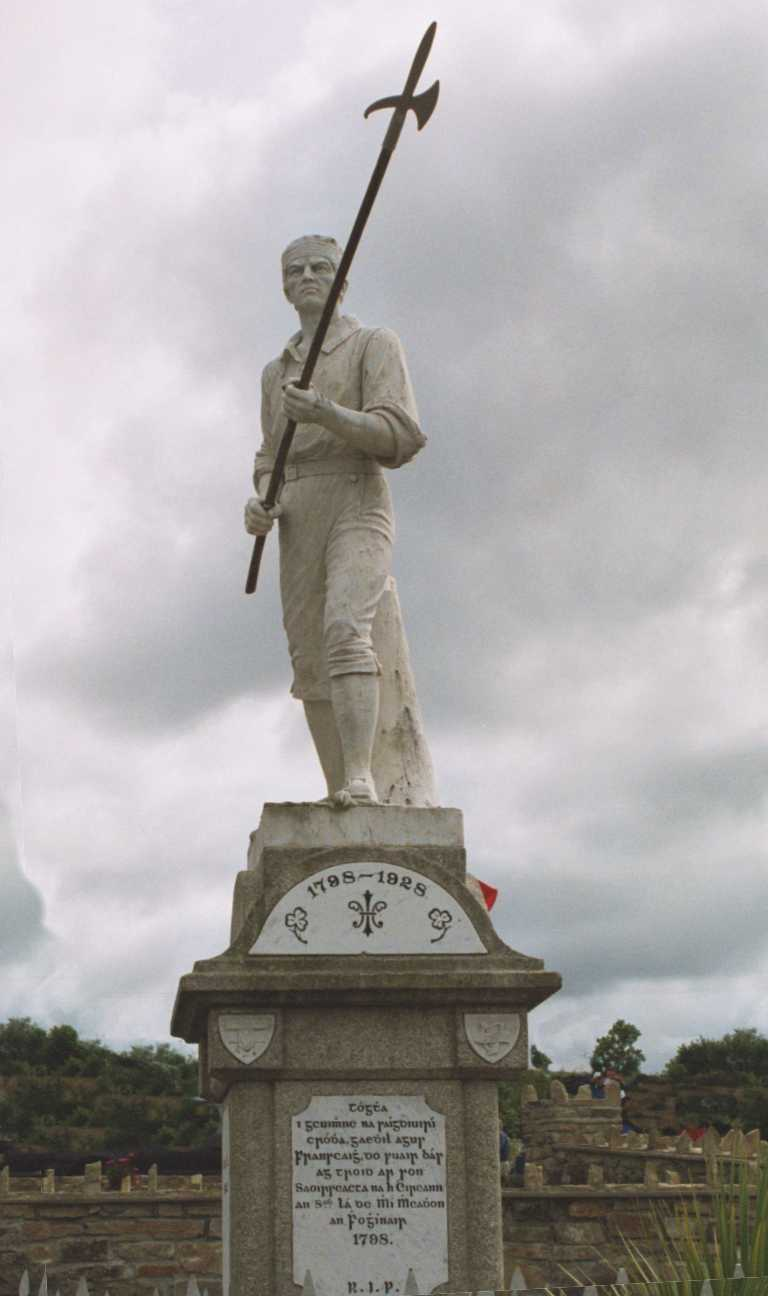
- Pikemen memorial in Ballinamuck
- Motto: Is glas iad na cnoic i bhfad uainn / The faraway hills are green.
- Location in Ireland
- Coordinates: 53°52′00″N 7°43′00″W
- Country: Ireland
- Province: Leinster
- County: County Longford
- Elevation: 82 m (269 ft)
- Time zone: UTC+0 (WET)
  - Summer (DST): UTC-1 (IST (WEST))
- Irish Grid Reference: N184907

Ballinamuck (Irish: Béal Átha na Muc, meaning 'mouth of the pig's ford') is a village in the north of County Longford in the Midlands of Ireland. It is around 15 km north of Longford Town.

It was the scene of the Battle of Ballinamuck, where a combined Franco-Irish army aiding the United Irishmen rebellion of 1798 was defeated. The French soldiers were eventually repatriated. The Irish prisoners were either killed on site or taken to St Johnstown - today's Ballinalee - where they were executed in what is known locally as Bullys Acre and buried there. Ballinamuck is twinned with the French town of Essert.

== Transport ==
Whartons Travel operates bus route 975 on behalf of the National Transport Authority. It serves the village six times a day (not Sundays) providing services to Longford via Drumlish and to Cavan via Arva. Bus Éireann route 463 (Carrigallen-Longford) serves the village on Wednesdays. The nearest rail services can be accessed at Longford railway station.
