= Rockfield Lake =

Lake on the boundary of Connacht and Ulster

- Loch Pháirc na Carraige (Irish)
- Location within Ireland
- Location: County Leitrim and County Cavan
- Coordinates: 53.981°N 7.584°W
- Primary inflows: Cullies River
- Primary outflows: Cullies River, eventually emptying into Lough Oughter and the wider Erne System
- Basin countries: Ireland
- Surface area: 38 ha (94 acres)
- Surface elevation: 47 m (154 ft)
- Settlements: The lake is almost 2.5 miles (4.0 km) east of Carrigallen

Rockfield Lake (Irish: Loch Pháirc na Carraige, meaning 'Lough of the Field of Rocks'), also known as Rockfield Lough, is a lake or lough situated between Carrigallen and Killeshandra, two small towns on the northern edge of the Midlands in Ireland.

Nowadays, part of the lake is in County Leitrim, which is part of the Province of Connacht, while most of the lake is in County Cavan, which is part of the Province of Ulster. This means that the provincial boundary between Connacht and Ulster now runs through the lough. However, up until the early seventeenth century, all of the lake was considered part of County Leitrim in Connacht. The Cullies River (Irish: An Abhainn Dubh, meaning 'the Black River') flows through Rockfield Lake, entering the lake at its southern end and flowing out of the lake at its north-western end. This small river flows from nearby Cullies Lake, and flows on, via Drumhart Lake, through Rockfield Lake to Glasshouse Lake.

Rockfield Lake covers about 94 acres (around 38 hectares) and is just over 36 feet (just over 11 metres) deep at its deepest point, this point being at the southern end of the lake. The surface elevation of the lake is 154 feet or 47 metres.

== Location ==
Rockfield Lake is situated where South-East Leitrim meets the western part of County Cavan. It is located in the middle of a 'triangle' framed by the following small towns: Killeshandra, a few miles to the north-east; Carrigallen, about 2 1/2 miles to the west; and Arvagh, a few miles to the south. The County Leitrim part of the lake lies within both the Barony of Carrigallen and the Civil Parish of Carrigallen, while the County Cavan part of the lake lies within both the Barony of Tullyhunco and the Civil Parish of Killeshandra. The main Killeshandra-to-Carrigallen road, which is part of the R201, runs just to the north of Rockfield Lake. This road passes over Kilbracken Bridge, a stone bridge which straddles the County Cavan-County Leitrim border. Kilbracken Bridge, which crosses the Cullies River, is a short distance north-west of Rockfield Lake.

The lake lies within three townlands, one of which is in County Leitrim, the other two being in County Cavan. The entire east and north-east of the lake lies within the townland of Rockfield, also known as Loughnafin, which is part of County Cavan. Most of the northern part of the lake lies within the townland of Portlongfield, also part of County Cavan. The western and south-western part of the lake lies within the townland of Aghavore, which is part of County Leitrim.

== Access and angling ==
The easiest public access to Rockfield Lake is from a sideroad numbered as the L1524, which runs within County Cavan. This sideroad runs close to the eastern shore of the lake and, together with the L1525, links the townland of Portlongfield with Arvagh. A paved lane leads from this sideroad down to the small public car park on the eastern shore of the lake.

Rockfield Lake is quite popular with anglers, with the eastern shore, which is the County Cavan shore, being particularly popular due to its easy public access from the L1524, the aforementioned public sideroad.

== Portlongfield Lake and Portlongfield Orange Hall ==
Portlongfield Lake, also known as Portlongfield Lough, is a very small lake immediately to the north of Rockfield Lake. This small lough, which is beside a small wood of trees, is in the townland of Portlongfield in County Cavan, and is separated from Rockfield Lake by a small hillock. Portlongfield Lake is just to the south of the main Carrigallen to Killeshandra road, being located between that road and the northern shore of Rockfield Lake. A stream flows into the Cullies River from Portlongfield Lake.

Very near Portlongfield Lake is Portlongfield Orange Hall, which was built c. 1890. This small Orange hall is just to the east of Portlongfield Lake, being just north of the north-eastern 'spur' of Rockfield Lake. The hall, which is also in the townland of Portlongfield, sits along the southern verge of the main Killeshandra-to-Carrigallen road, which is part of the R201.

== Drumhart Lake ==
Drumhart Lake, also known as Drumhart Lough, lies a short distance to the south of Rockfield Lake. Drumhart Lake is also a small lake, being much smaller than Rockfield Lake but being considerably larger than Portlongfield Lake. Drumhart Lake is partially in County Leitrim, while the rest of it is in County Cavan. The Cullies River flows through Drumhart Lake en route to Rockfield Lake.

Like Rockfield Lake to its north, Drumhart Lake is divided between three townlands. The County Cavan side of the lake is mainly in the townland of Drumhart, which covers all of the eastern part of the lake, while the southern end of the lake, also part of County Cavan, is in the townland of Drumlarney. The County Leitrim side of the lake, which covers the western and north-western part of the lake, is in the townland of Aghavore.

== Rockfield House ==
Rockfield House is located on a small hill just above the north-eastern shore of Rockfield Lake. The main gate into the grounds surrounding the house is on the L1524, the sideroad connecting Arvagh with the townland of Portlongfield. This large farmhouse is situated in the townland of Rockfield in County Cavan, and was probably originally built in the early to mid-eighteenth-century. The house is surrounded by the remains of its garden and grounds, while part of the original farmyard also survives to the rear of the house. Now derelict, Rockfield House and its grounds are privately owned and are not open to the public.
