= Killykeen Forest Park =

Forest in County Cavan, Ireland

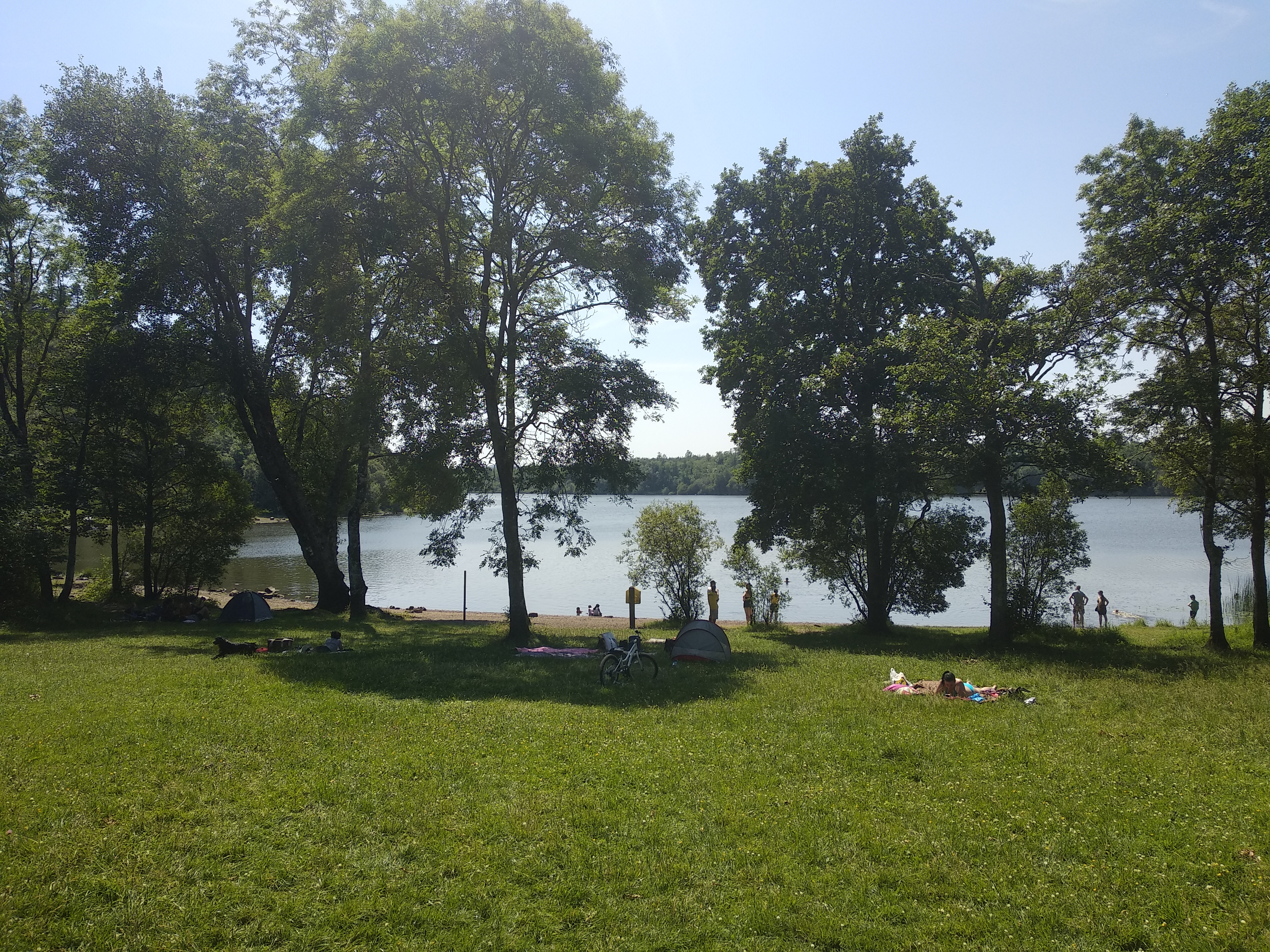
- Summertime bathers at Killykeen

- Location within Ireland
- Location: Killeshandra, County Cavan, Ireland
- Coordinates: 54°00′31″N 7°28′22″W
- Area: 600 acres (240 ha)
- Governing body: Coillte

Killykeen Forest Park straddling Lough Oughter is situated in County Cavan, Ireland approximately five miles from Cavan town. Responsibility for the upkeep of Killykeen is through the state's commercial forestry service Coillte together with the National Parks and Wildlife Service (NPWS) where Lough Oughter and its associated loughs are protected under the EU Habitats Directive as a Special Area of Conservation (SAC) and a Special Protection Area (SPA) for wildlife and particularly wintering birds. The forest consists of mainly mixed woodland including Norway and Sitka spruce, Ash, Oak and Beech. The area is popular with anglers because of its location along Lough Oughter which is connected to thousands of hectares of lakeland complexes. Canoeing, biking and windsurfing are also popular activities at the park. Other Attractions include Cloughoughter Castle and Gartnanoul Court Tomb.

== Gallery ==
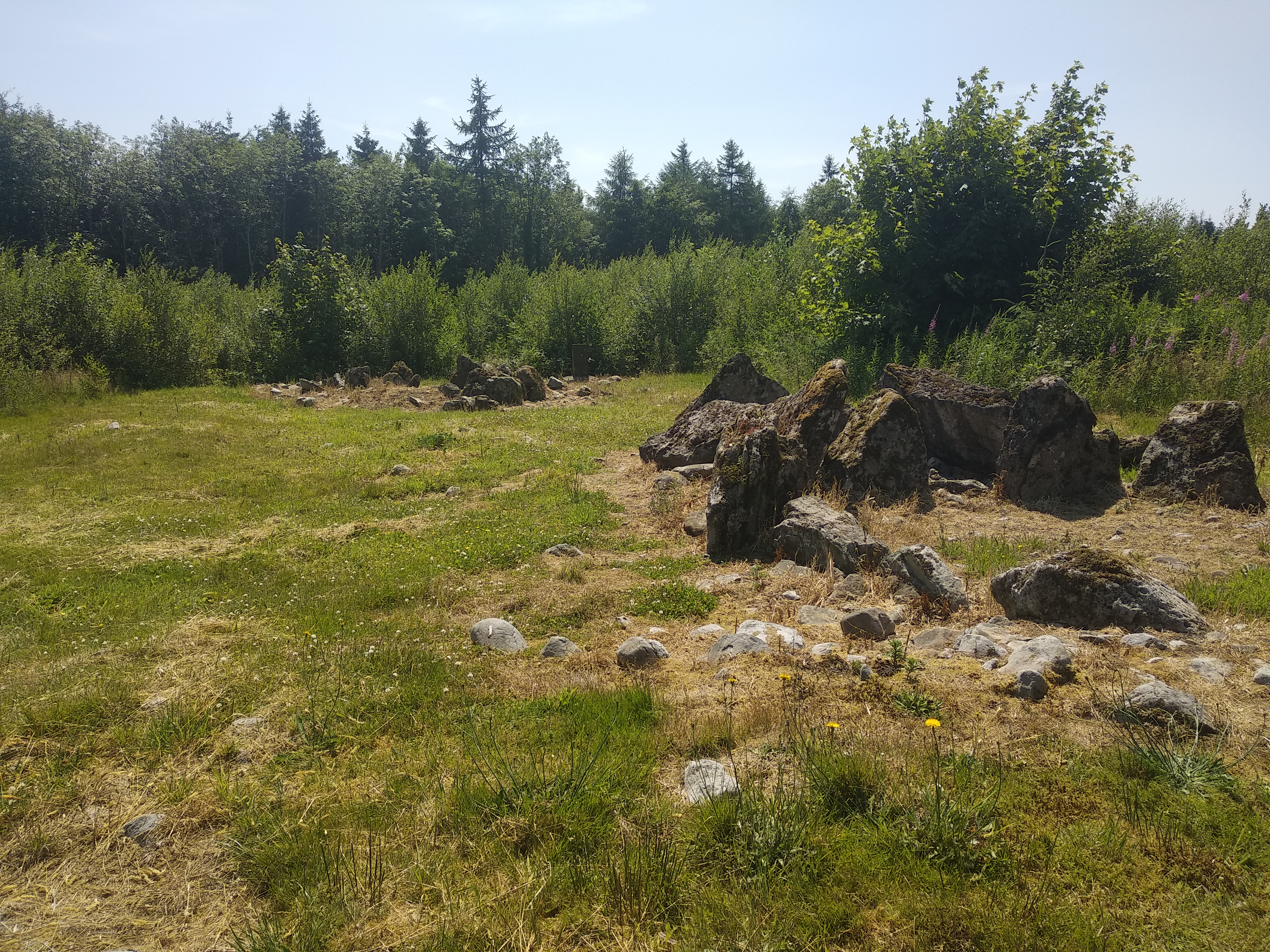
Gartnanoul Court Tomb

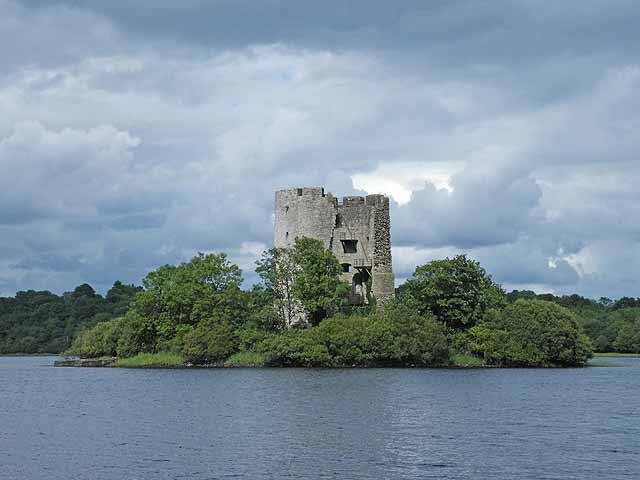
Cloughoughter Castle

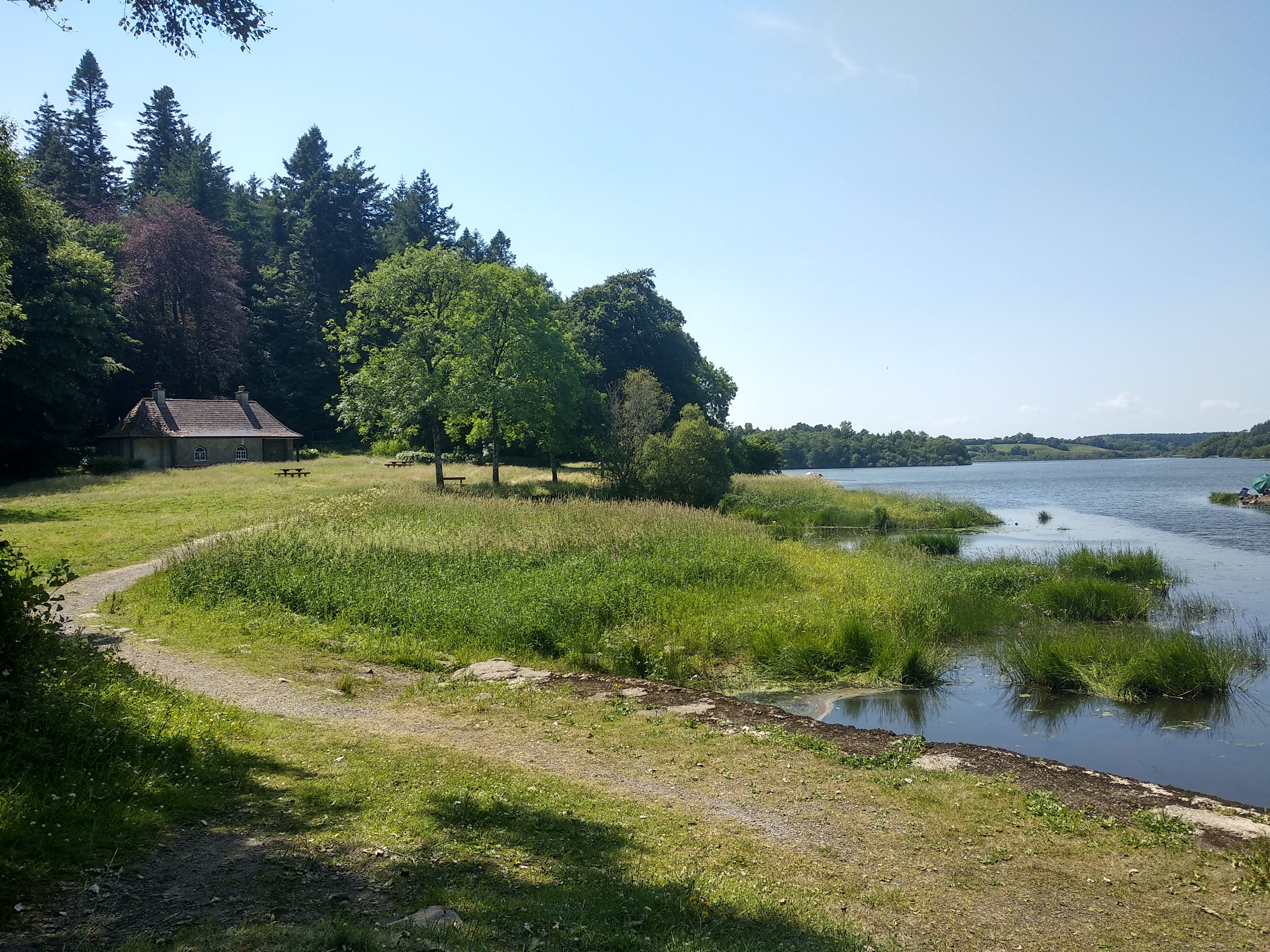
Lough Oughter
