= R198 road (Ireland) =

Road in Ireland

R198 road
- Bóthar R198
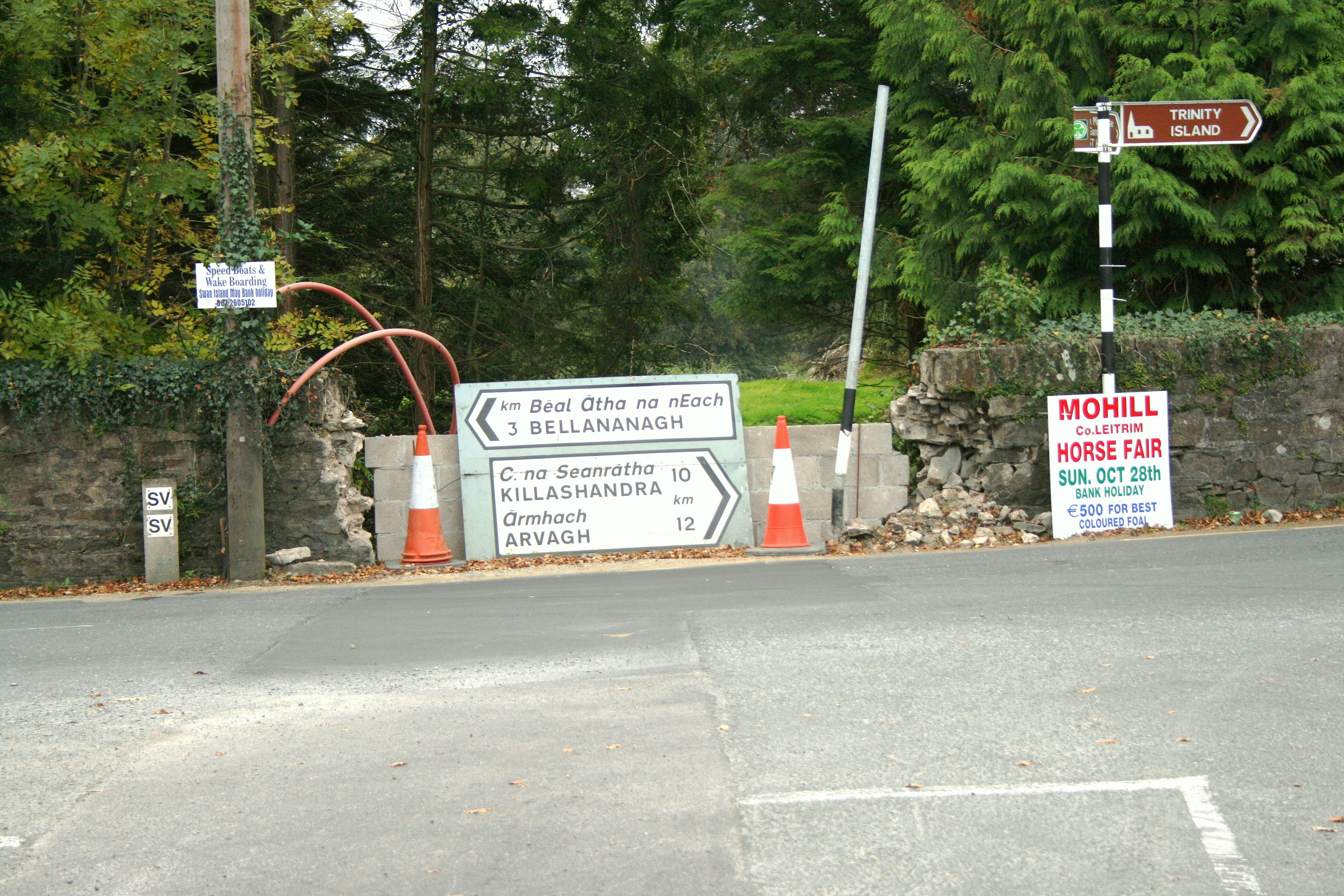
- R154/R198 junction in Crossdoney; Left is the R154, right the R198

Route information
- Length: 56 km (35 mi)

Location
- Country: Ireland
- Primary destinations: County Longford; Longford - leave town centre at junction with the N5 and at roundabout junction cross the N4; Drumlish; Ballinamuck; Leggah; Moyne; County Cavan; Arvagh - R203; (R199); Crossdoney - (R154); Cavan - terminates in the town centre

Highway system
- Roads in Ireland; Motorways; Primary; Secondary; Regional

The R198 road is a regional road in Ireland, linking Longford in County Longford to Cavan town. The road is 56 km (35 mi) long.

== See also ==
- Roads in Ireland
- National primary road
- National secondary road
