= R201 =

R201 may refer to:

- R201 railway (Croatia)
- R201 road (Ireland)
- R201 (Bangladesh), a regional road in Bangladesh
