= Frank Quinn (musician) =

Irish-American musician (1893–1964)

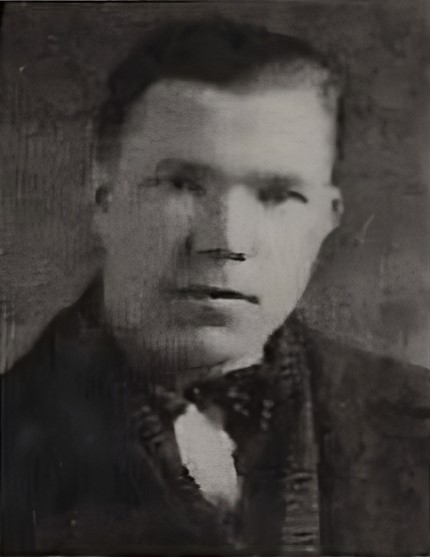

Background information
- Born: October 11, 1893; Drumlish, County Longford, Ireland
- Origin: New York City
- Died: January 1964 (aged 70)
- Genre: Irish traditional
- Occupation: Musician
- Instruments: Fiddle, melodeon, vocalist
- Years active: 1921–1936
- Labels: Columbia, Vocalion, OKeh, Victor, Gennett

Frank Quinn (October 11, 1893 – January 1964) was an Irish-American musician and bandleader, and a pioneering recording artist of traditional songs and arrangements of Irish melodies. He played the fiddle, the melodeon accordion and was a vocalist.

== Early life ==
Quinn was born on October 11, 1893, into a farming family in Greagh, Drumlish, County Longford, Ireland. At the age of 10, he and his family emigrated from Ireland to New York City. He first resided in Highland Falls in New York State with his elder sister, Mary Anne. By 1917, he was residing in New York City, employed as one of many Irish-born police officers in New York at that time.

== Musical education ==
It has been theorized by Dr. Conor Ward of the Dundalk Institute of Technology that Frank Quinn was a fiddle pupil of Bernard Rogers, a well respected fiddler also from Drumlish in County Longford. This is supported by a fiddle recording titled “Master Rogers” later made by Quinn.

== Recording artist ==
Among Quinn's first records were melodeon selections made for Columbia records on May 9, 1921. He would not return to Columbia until 1923, while continuing to record at Vocalion records and for OKeh records in November 1922. Quinn was featured by Vocalion in March 1922 for his double-sided 'special' record released for St. Patrick's Day, on which he recorded "The Cherry Blossom" jig and "The Swallow's Tail" reel on accordion. He was advertised as 'Patrolman Frank Quinn', referencing his multi-faceted career as a New York City traffic policeman and virtuoso accordionist. This record was among many collaborations Quinn would later have with the American-born pianist Edward Geoghegan ("Gagan").

He made two more recordings for Columbia in February 1923, including The Longford jig and The Virginia reel. He produced one trial record at Victor records on April 16, 1923, which was a medley of jigs and reels. He would go on to make a number of records at Victor after 1924. Quinn would also produce three sides for Gennett records Starr label in May 1924. He also recorded for the Gaelic Phonograph Co. His records became very popular amongst Irish-Americans in the 1920s.

Quinn's longest association was with Columbia records, which he resumed recording for in May 1924. He would continue to produce melodeon and introduce many Irish fiddle records to the American, Canadian and overseas record markets until 1936. His most notable record during this period was the "Leg of the Duck", a jig recorded for Columbia in July 1925. Quinn's records were featured on a radio broadcast by Ben Selvin known as "Columbia's Irish Hour" on March 14, 1928. He notably recorded "Master Rogers - Reel Medley" with The Smiles and Tears of Erin Orchestra on November 30, 1934, led by fiddler Jim Clarke. It was recorded for Columbia, Vocalion and Regal Zonophone Records. In 1927–28, Quinn teamed up with Fermanagh-born fiddler and lilter Joe Maguire and pianist Ed Geoghegan on six (possibly seven) Columbia sides.

== Legacy ==
Frank Quinn's relatively short recording career ended in 1936, but this did not stop his records from being heard for generations after. Quinn was recognized as an important figure in Irish folk music in 1997, with a number of his original recordings being republished by Arhoolie Folklyric and Folkways Records on CD and later digital.
