= Arvagh =

Village in County Cavan, Ireland

Arvagh Irish: Ármhach
- Town
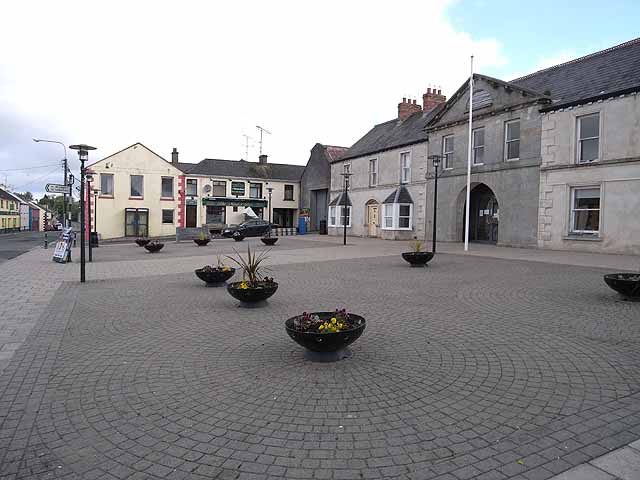
- Market House

- Location in Ireland
- Coordinates: 53°55′N 7°35′W
- Country: Ireland
- Province: Ulster
- County: County Cavan
- Barony: Tullyhunco

Population (2022)
  - Total: 419

Arvagh (Irish: Árṁaċ/Ármhach, meaning 'division or place of slaughter'), or Arva, is a small market town in County Cavan, Ireland, on the shores of Garty Lough and overlooked by Bruse Mountain. It is located on the junction of the R198 and R203 regional roads. As of 2022, the town had a population of 419.

It is situated in the centre of the drumlin belt on the border of Counties Longford and Leitrim. Its location is about 3 km southeast of the tripoint where the three provinces of Ulster, Leinster and Connacht meet.

== Toponymy ==
Árṁaċ, or Ármhach (meaning "Battlefield" or "Place of Slaughter"), was brought about because Arvagh is on the borders of 3 counties and provinces, Leitrim, Longford and Cavan (Connaght, Leinster and Ulster). The royal families of these counties would battle in Arvagh and as a result many died, Hence "Place of Slaughter". In 1836, Arvagh was recorded by John O'Donovan as Airbheach, 'a division'. Under descriptive marks it was recorded that "The town of Arvagh is small...The word Arvagh is derived from a rocky spot in the adjoining townland and on which the despensary is built, which signifies the place of blood or slaughter"

Local folklore, recorded in the Dúchas Schools' Collection, supports this interpretation, associating the name with historical battles in the surrounding area. However, as is common with early Irish toponyms, there is no definitive historical record of a specific event giving rise to the name, and it may also refer more broadly to a territorial or symbolic landscape feature. Another entry from the Schools' Collection records that "the real name for the town is Drumalt," implying that this may have been the original name before it became known as Arva.

== History ==
=== Early history ===
Arva (Irish Ármhach, "battlefield") lies at the western edge of the barony of Teallach Dhúnchadha (Tullyhunco) in County Cavan. Archaeological surveys have recorded over twenty ringforts (ráth) in and around the townland, indicating continuous settlement from the 6th to the 10th centuries.

In the early medieval period the area formed part of the over‑kingdom of Breifne, ruled by the Uí Briúin Breifne dynasty. From the 11th century the local túath of Tullyhunco was governed by the Mág Tighearnán sept, whose chiefs administered Brehon law and collected tribute from their crannóg at Cruachan O'Cúbhrán.

Between the 8th and 12th centuries Breifne consolidated into West Breifne (under the O'Rourke kings) and East Breifne (under the O'Reilly kings). Tullyhunco, including Arva, was absorbed into East Breifne by the mid‑13th century, a division confirmed by conflicts such as the Battle of Magh Slécht in 1256. This Gaelic lordship remained until the Tudor conquest of Ireland in the 16th century.

=== Plantation and foundation of the town ===
Gaelic control began to collapse during the late 16th century, particularly following the Nine Years' War (1594–1603) and the Flight of the Earls (1607). These events paved the way for the Plantation of Ulster, a policy of land confiscation and colonisation carried out by the English Crown. Arva, along with much of southern Ulster, was granted to British settlers. The modern town was likely established during this plantation period in the early 17th century.

=== 18th and 19th century development ===
During the 18th and 19th centuries, Arva developed further under the control of the Gosford estate, which was held by the Acheson family, later the Earls of Gosford. Surviving estate maps from 1822 and 1845 show a formally planned town layout centred around a market house and fair green.

In 1841, at which time the 1841 Census recorded a population of 69, there were four pubs in the village and the monthly fairs were of considerable local trade importance.

=== Early 20th century ===
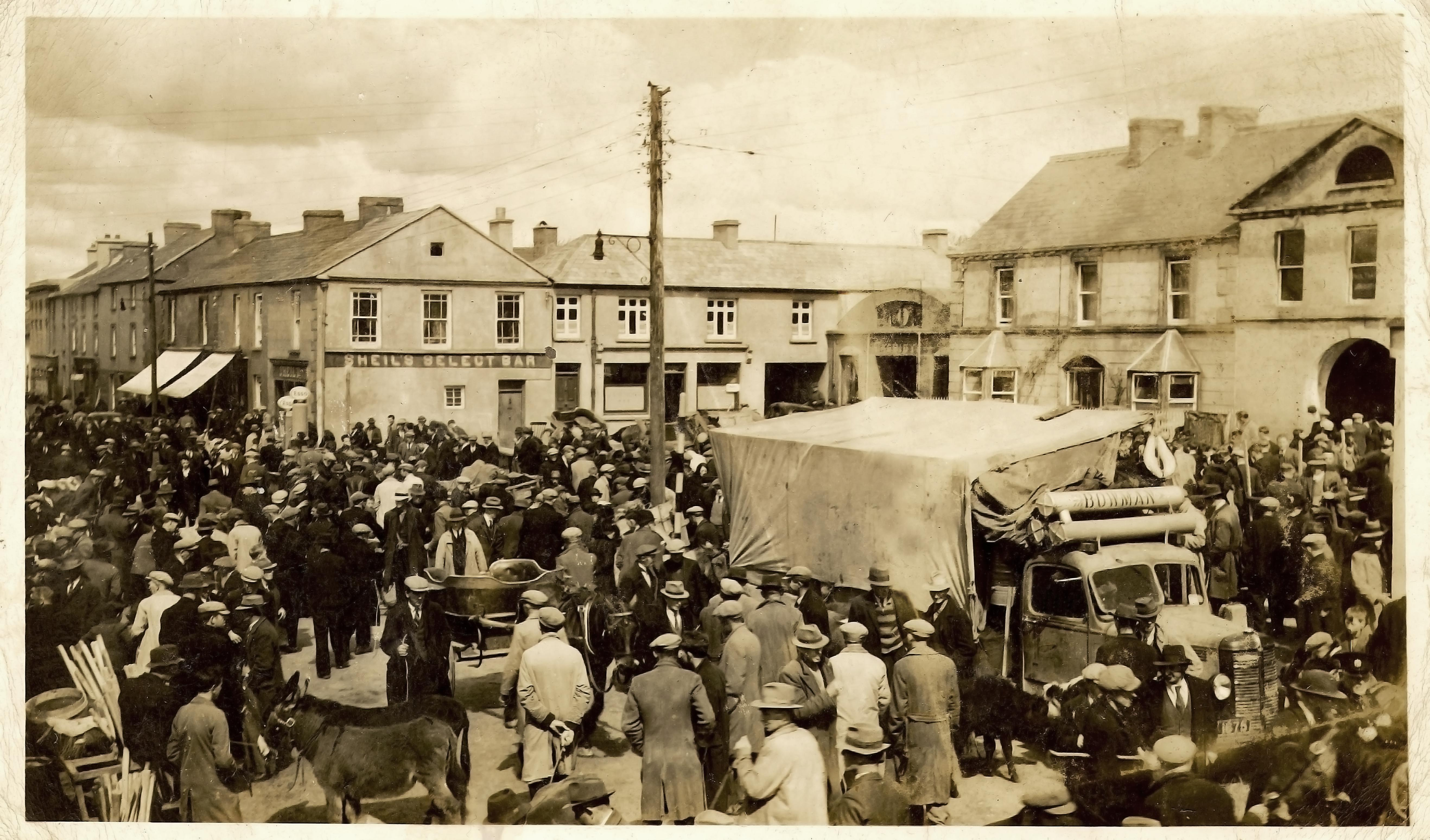
Arva on fair day (1940s)

A valuable snapshot of life in Arva during the early 20th century is preserved in the Schools' Collection, compiled in the 1930s by local schoolchildren as part of a nationwide folklore project.

A snapshot of life in Arva during the early 20th century is preserved in the Schools' Collection, compiled in the 1930s by local schoolchildren as part of a nationwide folklore project. One account, written by Joy Scott of Arva National School on 18 March 1938, describes how the town was transitioning into the modern era, with the arrival of electricity:

"There is electric light in the town which brightens it very much at night, there are lights along the streets and in nearly every house. Long ago there was only oil lamps on the street which did not show much light but now that is replaced by the electricity."

The same contributor described the town's layout and social life during the 1930s:

"There are four streets in the town namely: Main Street, Pound Street, Broad Road and Longford Street. There are a few fine buildings in the town. There are three large dances halls namely 'St. Patrick's Hall', 'Moonlight Pavilion' and 'Memorial Hall'. The guards barrick, the post office, three banks, a chapel and a church. There is a fair held once a month in the town and a market each week. In the summer evenings the young people play tennis, camogie, football and lots of other games and in winter there are many amusements such as pictures, dances, and concerts."

== Governance ==
Arva is located within the jurisdiction of Cavan County Council, in the local electoral area of Ballyjamesduff, one of the three electoral areas used for local elections within the county.

For national representation, Arva is part of the Dáil constituency of Cavan–Monaghan. At the European level, Arva falls is in the Midlands–North-West constituency, which elects five Members of the European Parliament (MEPs).

== Demographics ==
Historical population data for Arva often refers to the wider civil parish of Arvagh, which encompasses the town and surrounding rural area, rather than the town alone. The parish historically covered approximately 17,074 statute acres. In 1837, the population of the parish was recorded as 4,580, of whom 422 resided in the town itself. Throughout the 19th century, the parish population declined significantly, reflecting trends in rural depopulation, famine, and emigration.

Population of Arva parish and town (1837–2022)
Year	Arva Parish		Arva Town	
Year	Population	±%	Population	±%
1837	4,580	—	422	—
1861	6,294	—	no data available	—
1871	5,777	−8.2%	no data available	—
1881	5,606	−3.0%	no data available	—
1891	4,912	−12.4%	no data available	—
1901	4,381	−10.8%	no data available	—
1911	3,994	−8.8%	no data available	—
1921	no data available	—	no data available	—
1931	no data available	—	no data available	—
1941	no data available	—	no data available	—
1951	no data available	—	no data available	—
1961	no data available	—	no data available	—
1971	no data available	—	no data available	—
1981	no data available	—	no data available	—
1991	no data available	—	no data available	—
1996	no data available	—	327	—
2002	no data available	—	357	+9.2%
2006	no data available	—	364	+2.0%
2011	no data available	—	380	+4.4%
2016	no data available	—	411	+8.2%
2022	no data available	—	419	+1.9%

=== Irish language ===
The 2022 census reported the following language proficiency among Arva residents:

- English only: 96.2%
- Irish speakers: 28.5%
- Other languages: 3.8%

Of those who spoke Irish, a small percentage used it daily outside the education system.

== Events ==
Each year the Arvagh Agricultural Show takes place in the town. The "3 Province Festival" also takes place here over 10 days from the last weekend in July until the first weekend in August. The festival includes music, theatre, comedy, art, competitions and other events.

== Transport ==
=== Bus ===
Whartons Travel operate bus route 975 on behalf of the National Transport Authority. It serves the town six times a day (not Sundays) providing services to Longford via Drumlish and Cavan. Bus Éireann route 465, (Carrigallen-Killashandra-Cavan) serves the town on Tuesday.

=== Rail ===
Arva Road railway station on the erstwhile Killashandra branch was the nearest station to Arvagh. Nowadays bus route 975 provides a link to Longford railway station.

== Angling ==
The Arvagh area has numerous angling sites such as Garty Lough, Hollybank Lake, Gulladoo Lake, Guiniken Lake and Rockfield Lake. The Arvagh International Fishing Festival takes place in Arvagh every September.

== Sport ==
Arva St Patrick's is the local Gaelic Athletic Association club.

== See also ==
- List of towns and villages in Ireland
- Market Houses in Ireland
