= R204 road (Ireland) =

Road in Ireland

Coordinates: 54.006549°N 7.688477°W

R204 road
- Bóthar R204
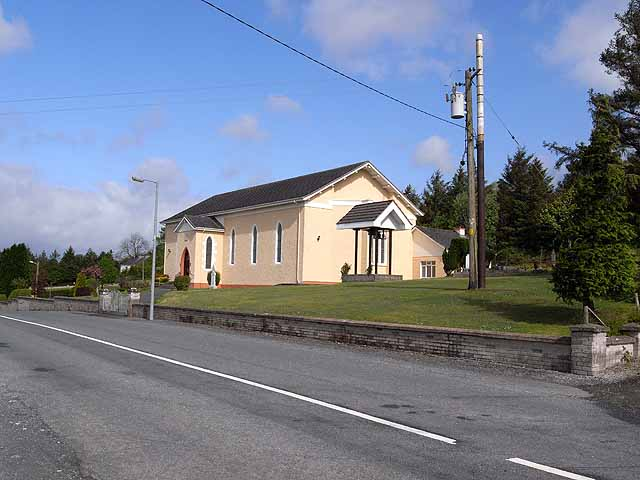
- The R204 passing St Mary's Church, Drumreilly.

Route information
- Length: 14.1 km (8.8 mi)

Major junctions
- From: R202 Ballinamore
- Crosses Ballinamore Canal
- To: R201 Calloughs

Location
- Country: Ireland

Highway system
- Roads in Ireland; Motorways; Primary; Secondary; Regional

The R204 road, also called the Ballinamore–Carrigallen Road, is a regional road in Ireland, located in County Leitrim.
