= Killeshandra =

Village in County Cavan, Ireland

Killeshandra Irish: Cill na Seanrátha
- Village
- Killashandra
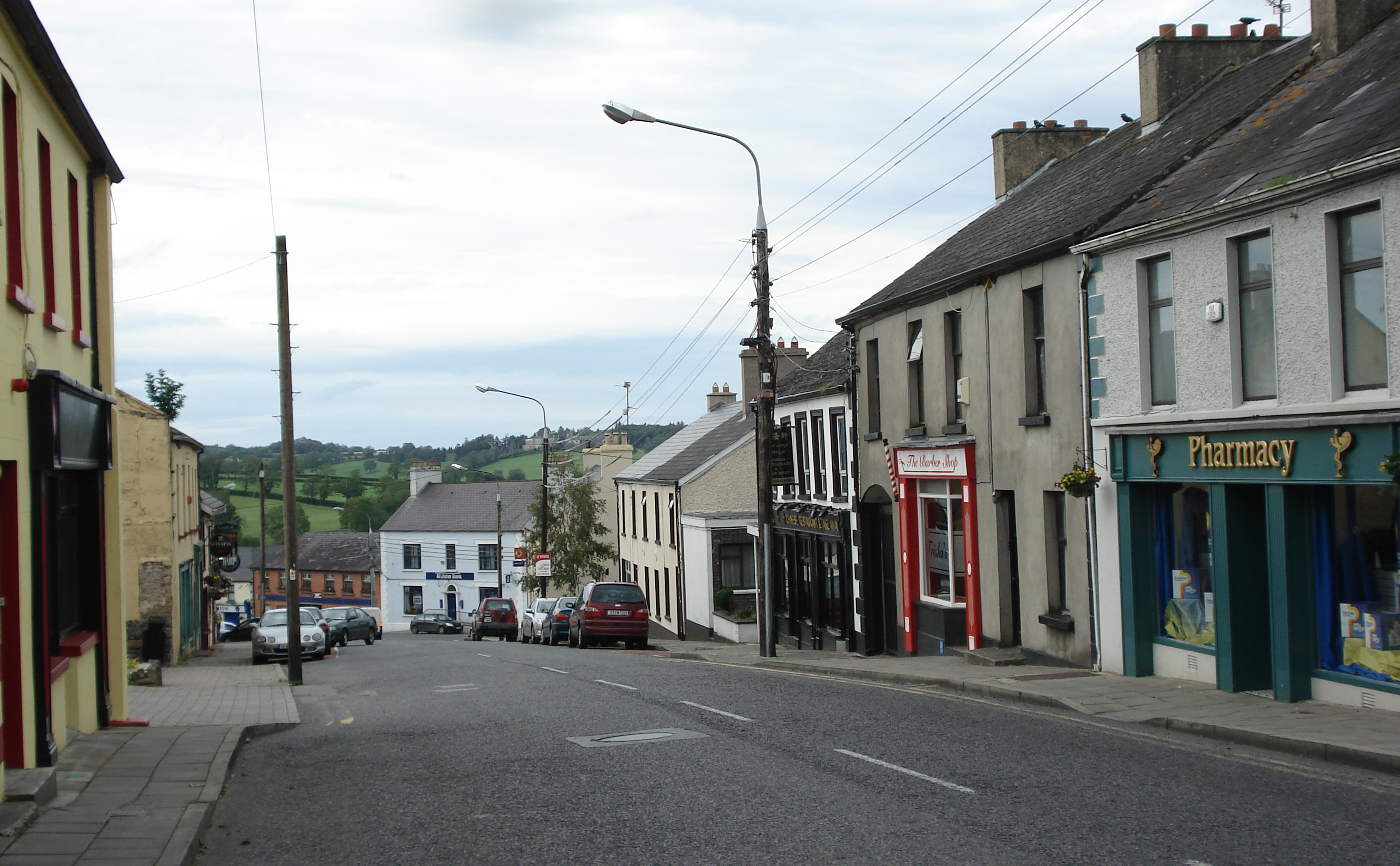
- Main Street

- Location in Ireland
- Coordinates: 54.01523°N 7.52894°W
- Country: Ireland
- Province: Ulster
- County: County Cavan
- Barony: Tullyhunco
- Elevation: 66 m (217 ft)

Population (2022)
  - Total: 248
- Irish Grid Reference: H308074

Killeshandra or Killashandra (Irish: Cill na Seanrátha, meaning 'church of the old rath or ring-fort') is a small town or village and civil parish in County Cavan, Ireland. It is located 20 kilometres (12 mi) west of Cavan Town. Killeshandra town has a long record of participation in the National Tidy Towns competition and has won several awards.

== History ==
=== Name and formation ===
Killeshandra's name derives from the Irish Cill na Seanrátha, meaning "church of the old rath" (ringfort). The church was first noted in Papal registers during the medieval 14th century when installed John McKiernan a cleric from the Augustinian St Mary's Drumlane Priory. The early Killeshandra town began during the seventeenth century Ulster Plantation period, when Sir Alexander Hamilton of Innerwick Castle, East Lothian, Scotland, was granted lands by the Crown in July 1610 to build a strong bawn and create a Protestant community around the barony of Tullyhunco. The 1641 rising led to the burning of the township followed by the surrender of the Hamilton's together with their Scottish Craigie neighbours, forced out of their settled lands by the Cavan O'Reilly rebel army.

=== 17th century ===
In the 17th century, following the Restoration after the civil war, Sir Francis Hamilton (1st Baron of Castle Hamilton) regained control of the area. He set about building a new market town of Killeshandra with Scottish settlers and migrant French Huguenot exiles who were especially noted for their industry linen skills and thrift. The new settlers and their families quickly adapted to the local conditions, beginning to grow flax and process linen in the Cavan region.

During the early Plantation part of the 17th century the 'church of the old rath' was "reformed" for Protestant Scottish Episcopalian use and included glebe lands allocated to the parish, part of Anglican Kilmore diocese. An initial survey of Cavan parish churches initiated by William Bedell Bishop of Kilmore, reported that the medieval Killeshandra church was already newly repaired with a new roof and east window added. The sum of £20 Sterling was therefore imposed in 1634 for further re-edifying works. Later in the 17th century, the church was remodeled by Sir Francis Hamilton (3rd Baron Hamilton of Castle Hamilton) after the death in 1688 of his father Sir Charles Hamilton (2nd Baron Hamilton of Castle Hamilton) and his wife Catherine Semple. A transept was added with a crypt as a memorial to his parents Sir Charles and his wife, members of (the original) Scottish Hamilton patentee family. Today, this church form part of the ruined protected structure along with the graveyard, enclosure wall and gate piers, (situated at the lower end of the town). When Sir Francis Hamilton (3rd Baron Hamilton of Castle Hamilton) died in 1713, his body was brought to Comber in County Down to be interred together with his (first) wife the Lady Catherine (nee Montgomery) who died 1692 in her Montgomery family vault. A large marble memorial plaque exists in the present Killeshandra Church of Ireland church detailing the life of Sir Francis Hamilton (3rd Baron of Castle Hamilton). It was subscribed to by Sir Francis surviving (2nd) wife Lady Anna Hamilton. She later remarried Lord Archibald Hamilton (no relation to the previous Hamilton's). Lay Anna died in 1719 and was laid to rest in Westminster Abbey, London.

The historic rath church displays some unusual architectural characteristics; it is T-shaped, with a south-facing transept created in the Renaissance neo-classical style, described in the Pevsner Guide to South Ulster as "arguably the finest Restoration building in Ulster, a handsome evocation of the improving architectural eloquence of the age". The east-facing window, dated from the late 17th century re-build is in the more traditional Gothic style. The heraldic coat of arms on the south facing transept belongs to Sir Charles Hamilton and his wife Catherine Semple (2nd Baron of Castle Hamilton), died in 1688 and the Hamilton family motto: signifying the oak tree and wood cutters cross-saw with the word 'THROUGH' is also on the gate piers/pillars. it is believed that Sir Charles and his wife are buried beneath the crypt.

=== 19th century ===
A new Anglican church was built, circa 1842, further up the main street from the earlier church. At this time, some of the earlier Hamilton family memorials (attributed to the Irish sculptor William Kidwell) were brought from the old church and placed inside the new building. The graveyard continued in "mixed" denomination community use for well over a century after the church was closed and unroofed. Since Church of Ireland dis-establishment in 1869, the old church was abandoned in a ruinous state and left into the care of the local authority. The 'Rath Church' is now recognised as a protected structure and included in the Record of Protected Structures maintained by Cavan County Council. The graveyard includes some finely carved stone grave slabs, mausoleums and heraldic memorials from prominent local families dating from the early 18th century.

=== Flax and linen ===
Killeshandra, from the early 18th century, earned a reputation for becoming a Linen Town when the local cottage flax growing and linen industry expanded considerably following an incentive from the Ulster Board of Trustees of Linen Manufacturers. Killeshandra was later described in Pigot's 1824 Directory as - "The greatest linen market in the county, and the inhabitants of the town and neighbourhood are principally employed in its manufacture". However, failure to gain support from the major local landlords including Lord Farnham and the Earl Annesley to capitalise on industrial methods of linen production when market sales approached their peak meant that Killeshandra would inevitably lose in the race to compete with the bigger Ulster linen-exporting towns further north, eventually causing hardship and destitution for many local flax growers and linen producers. As local industry peaked in 1790 the "Erection of a Market House for the benefit of the Town and Vicinity, by Nichola Ann (née Hamilton 1724–1804) the widow of Richard Jackson from Forkhill, County Armagh, co-heiress daughter of Arthur Cecil Hamilton of Castle Hamilton". The market-house was also once used as a district courthouse, demolished during the late 1960s to make way for widening of the Main street. A stone plaque describing the erection of the Market House is still visible on the wall of a Main Street shop premises. Possibly the earliest market house built in County Cavan.

Unrelated to the above - for around forty years Missionary Sisters of the Holy Rosary founded since 1924 in Killeshandra, and are sometimes referred to as the "Killeshandra Nuns". The convent has now been demolished and lands occupied by Lakeland Dairies Limited.

== Demographics ==
According to the 2022 census, Killeshandra's population was 248. Statistically the population decreased 36% from the 2016 census figure of 388, which was an increase of 6.6% from 364 in the 2011 census, which in turn showed an 11% drop in population from the 2006 census. By comparison, the 1911 population was 566. However, in the electoral division, which includes the town and surrounding district, a slight increase in population up to 1,141 persons was recorded in 2011. In previous centuries, when there were several thousand people living near Killeshandra, local industry and agriculture sustained the local population.

=== 1841 census ===
The 1841 census of Ireland returned an all-Ireland population count of just under 8.2 million persons. Very few Irish censuses records survive prior to 1901 due to the burning of the Dublin Public Records Office in 1922 during the Irish Civil War. The Killeshandra 1841 census was one of the few census from all over Ireland to have been saved and is viewable on the National Archives website. The 1841 census returns for Killeshandra record that a relatively high number of households were involved in the local cottage flax spinning and weaving industry, making Killeshandra a centre within the county for linen production. The Killeshandra parish population was then 8,440 persons.

== Public transport ==
=== Buses ===
As at 2023, Local Link route 929 serves the town with several buses to and from Cavan town and other local places. The town is also served by several Local Link Cavan Monaghan door-to-door routes.

Bus Éireann serves the town once weekly on Tuesdays, with route 465 providing a return journey to Cavan via Arvagh and Ballinagh, and a one-way to journey to Carrigallen.

=== Rail ===
Killashandra railway station was once the terminus of a short branch railway line between Cavan and Crossdoney on the Midland Great Western Railway line. Opened in 1886, the Killeshandra branch line, along with the Crossdoney to Cavan line, discontinued passenger service in 1947. The line remained open for goods traffic until 1959, then was closed completely in January 1960. Most of the rail infrastructure is now gone, but the station and a nearby goods shed still remain.

== Recreation and tourism ==
Killeshandra is a "gateway" to the UNESCO Cuilcagh Lakelands Geopark region, part of the Erne catchment environment of rivers, lakes, wetlands and woodland. Together with the Lough Oughter Special Protected Area (SPA), it has been recognised by the EU programme for wildlife, Natura 2000, since 2010.

Killeshandra is also a base for the Killeshandra Camino Calling Walking Festival which takes place in June each year. There are several looped walking and cycling trails within Killykeen Forest Park. Rockfield Lake, which is popular with anglers, is a few kilometres southwest of the town.

The town is home to Killeshandra Gaelic Football Club.

== Dairy industry ==
Lakeland Dairies, which is the second largest dairy co-operative and third largest dairy processor in Ireland, has its headquarters in Killeshandra.

The dairy industry in Killeshandra began when the Drummully Co-operative Society was founded on 23 September 1896. A committee decided to establish a creamery in Killeshandra when local farmers promised the milk from 987 cows. In March 1898, the new dairy business became known as the Killeshandra Co-operative Agricultural Society. That business was successful, winning prizes for butter and dairy products at home and abroad. In 1996, a century after its founding, Killeshandra Co-op was handling the milk from over 4,000 farmer suppliers. The co-op has since grown, including through mergers with other companies, to form Lakeland Dairies.

In October 2013, Lakeland Dairies purchased the former Ulster Bank premises in Killeshandra town, next door to the company's headquarters.

== People ==
- Michael Donohoe, former Democratic U.S. Representative of Pennsylvania, born in Killeshandra.
- William Farrell, designer of the Killeshandra Church of Ireland building.
- William Hales, author and for 43 years rector of Killeshandra.
- Margaret Scott Hawthorne (1869–1958), tailoress and early workers rights campaigner in New Zealand, originally from Cornafean, near Killeshandra.
- Stephen King, former Cavan Gaelic football star.
- Thomas Lough, pioneer of Killeshanadra Co-operative Agricultural & Dairy Society. Also liberal MP for West Islington, London.
- Thomas J. O'Neill, dry goods merchant and philanthropist whose donation funded the building of the Cathedral of Mary Our Queen, Baltimore in Maryland
- John Joe O'Reilly, former Cavan Gaelic football star.
- Philip O'Reilly, former MP for Cavan and 1641 Rebellion leader.
- Tom O'Reilly, former Cavan politician.
- Eamonn Owens, actor in The Butcher Boy (film).
- George Richardson (VC) of Derrylane, Killeshandra.

== In popular culture ==
- The Ohio-based Irish folk band Brady's Leap has released an album entitled The Road to Killeshandra. William Greenway, poet and Professor of English at Youngstown State University, references the town in the first verse of the song “Cavan Girl”.
- In the Irish folk song "Cavan Girl", the first-person narrator walks "the road from Killeshandra" that runs "twelve long miles around the lake to get to Cavan town".
- The Irish folk song "Come Out, Ye Black and Tans" mentions "the green and lovely lanes of Killeshandra" in its chorus.

== See also ==
- List of towns and villages in Ireland
- Market Houses in Ireland
- Irish linen
