= George Richardson (VC) =

Recipient of the Victoria Cross (1831–1923)

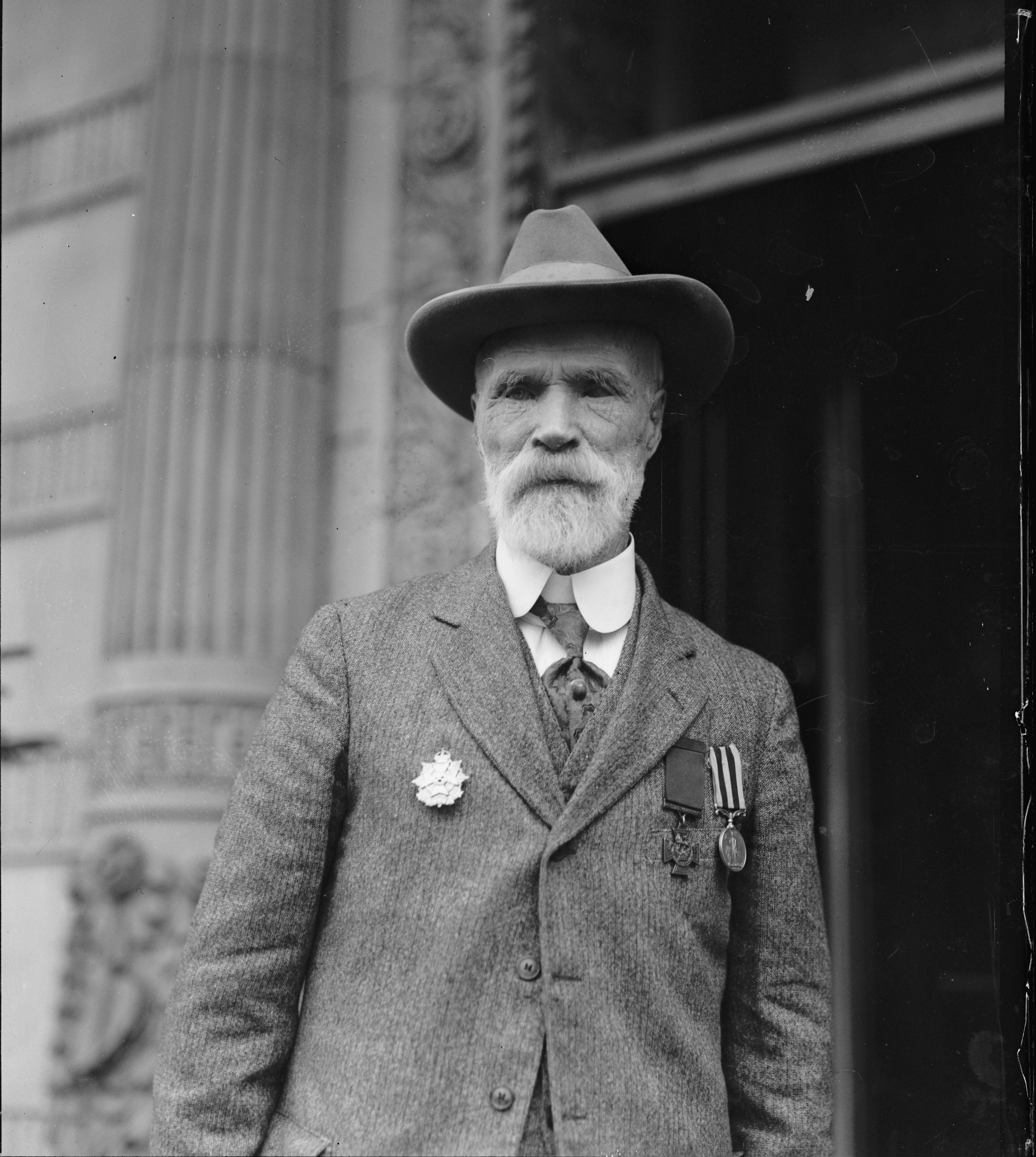
- Born: 1 August 1831; Derrylane, Killeshandra, County Cavan
- Died: 28 January 1923 (aged 91); London, Ontario, Canada
- Burial place: Prospect Cemetery, Toronto, Ontario
- Military career
- Allegiance: United Kingdom
- Branch: British Army
- Rank: Sergeant
- Unit: 34th Regiment of Foot
- Conflicts: Indian Mutiny; Fenian Raids
- Awards: Victoria Cross

George Richardson VC (1 August 1831 – 28 January 1923) was born in Derrylane, Killeshandra, County Cavan the son of John and Anne Richardson. He became an Irish recipient of the Victoria Cross, the highest and most prestigious award for gallantry in the face of the enemy that can be awarded to British and Commonwealth forces.

== Details ==
He was 27 years old, and a private in the 34th Regiment of Foot (later The Border Regiment), British Army during the Indian Mutiny when the following deed took place for which he was awarded the VC:

At Kewanie, Trans-Gogra, on the 27th of April, 1859, for determined courage in having, although severely wounded,—one arm being disabled,—closed with and secured a Rebel Sepoy armed with a loaded revolver.

He emigrated to Montreal, Canada and joined / Served with the 1st Prince of Wales Regiment (1st P.W.R.), an antecedent unit of The Canadian Grenadier Guards and achieved the rank of sergeant from approx. 1865–1878. He retired, and was given a land grant in Southern, Ontario where he lived until passing in London, Ontario, Canada on 28 January 1923.
