= Loughtee Upper =

Barony in County Cavan, Ireland

Loughtee Upper Lucht Tí Uachtarach (Irish)
- Barony
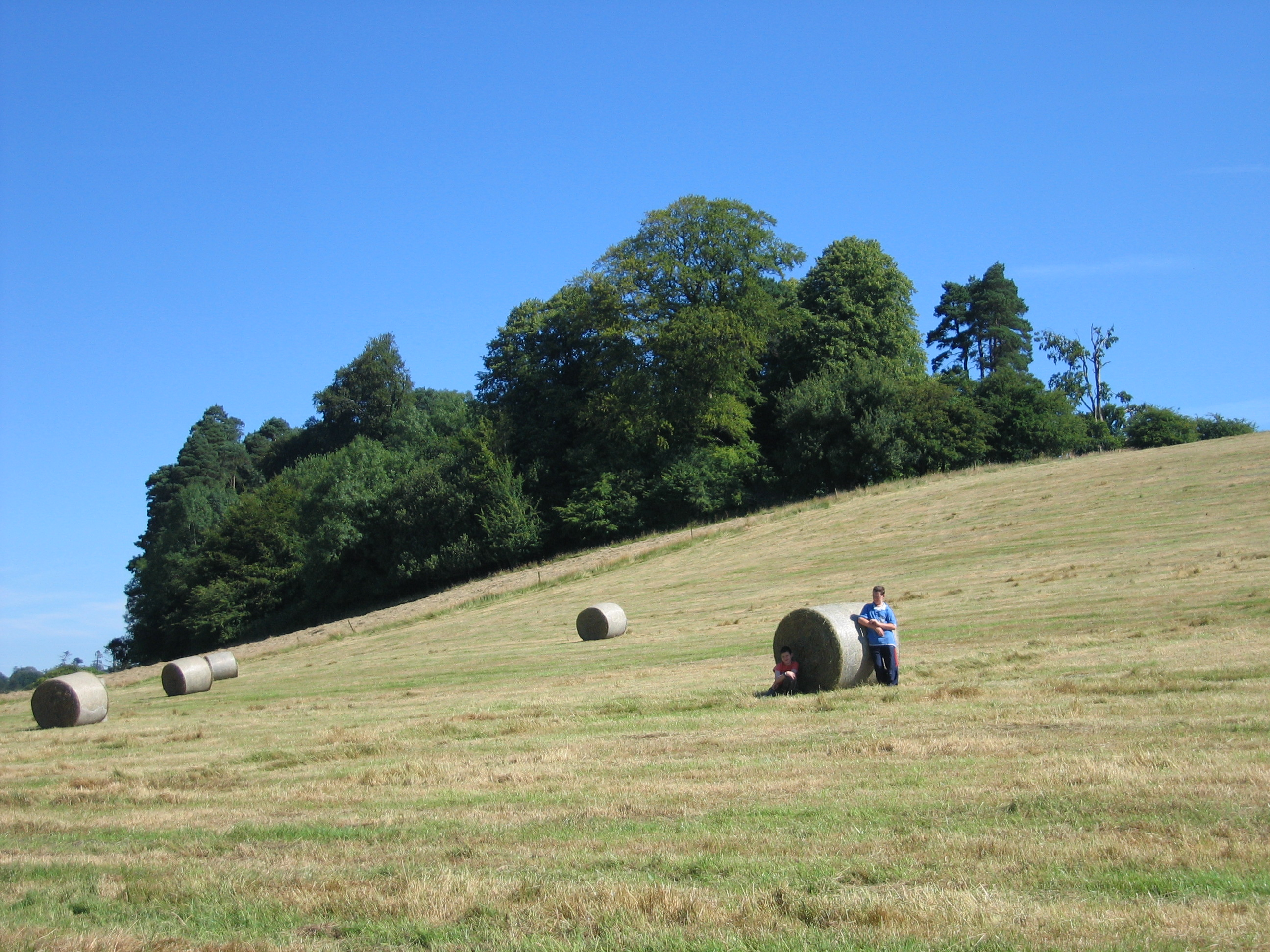
- Hayfield near Cavan Town

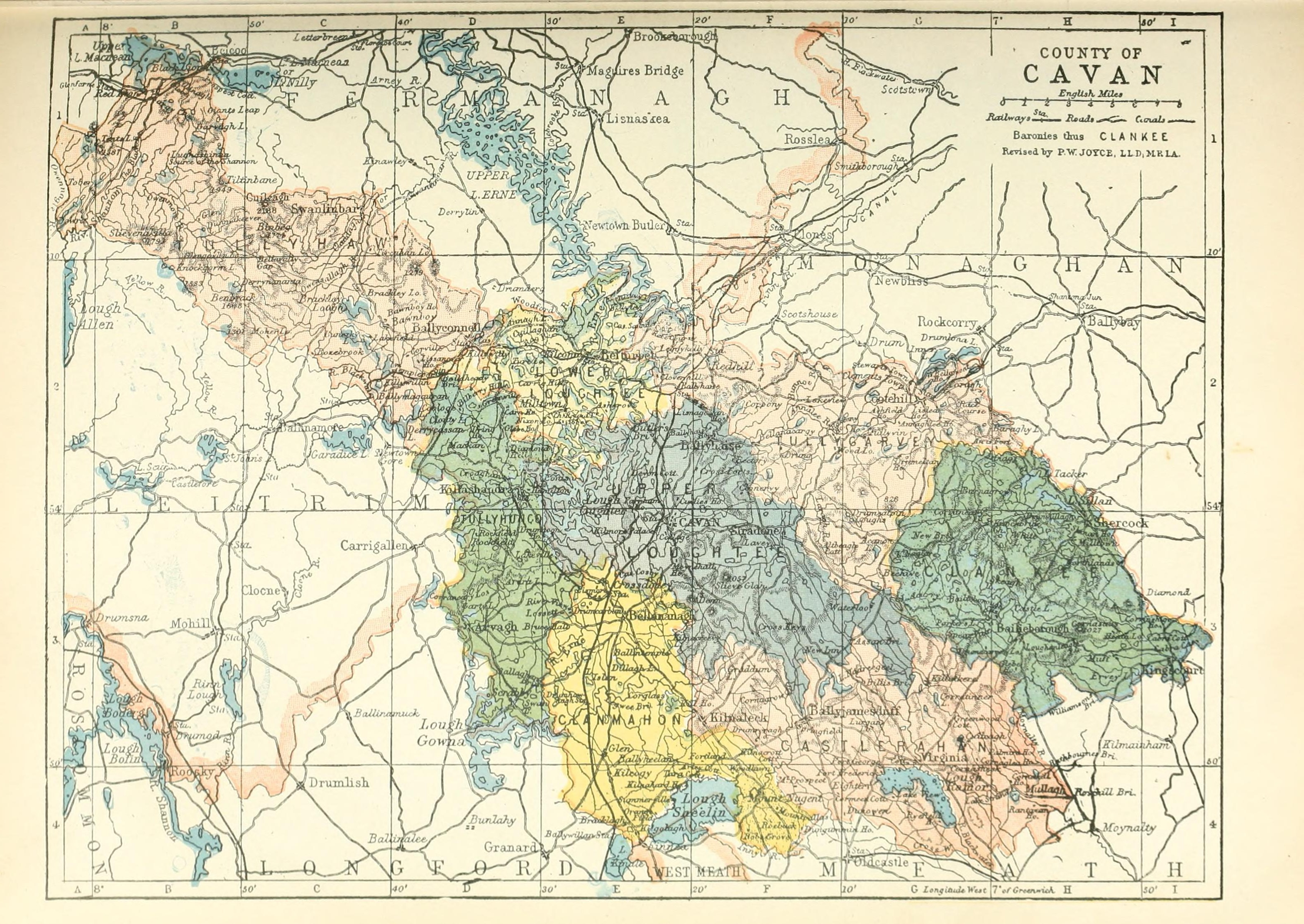
- Barony map of County Cavan, 1900; Loughtee Upper is in the centre, coloured blue.

- Location within Ireland
- Coordinates: 54°0′N 7°18′W
- Sovereign state: Ireland
- Province: Ulster
- County: Cavan

Area
  - Total: 258.36 km^{2} (99.75 sq mi)

Loughtee Upper (Irish: Lucht Tí Uachtarach), or Upper Loughtee, is a barony in County Cavan, Ireland. Baronies were mainly cadastral rather than administrative units. They acquired modest local taxation and spending functions in the 19th century before being superseded by the Local Government (Ireland) Act 1898.

== Etymology ==
Loughtee Upper takes its name from the Irish Loch an Tí (Lake of the House), which was named after Lough Tee lake in Drumlane parish. Early Modern Irish lucht tighe Még Mathghamhna (Annals of the Four Masters), "people of the household of Mac Mahon"; the land was allocated to the Mic Bhradaigh vassals of the McMahons as mensal land.

== Geography ==
Loughtee Upper is located in the middle of County Cavan, east of the River Erne and Lough Oughter.

== History ==
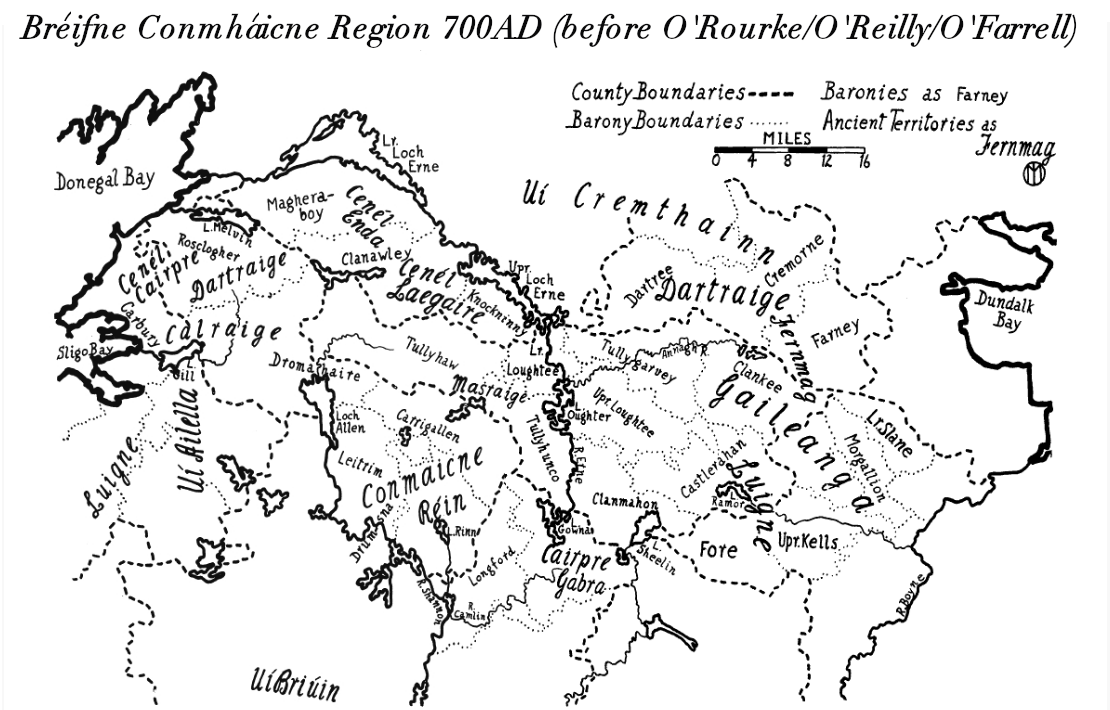
Map of Breifne in AD 700; "Upr. Loughtee" is seen in the centre.

Loughtee Upper was a centre of power for the Ó Raghallaigh (O'Reillys) Gaelic Irish tribe in the Middle Ages, based first at Lough Oughter and then moving to Tullymongan near to modern Cavan. The MacGobhains (McGowans) served as leader of the gallowglass. A Mic Bradaigh (Brady) family of clerics and freeholders was also here, ruling areas called Cúl Brighde and Teallach Cerbaill, near modern Stradone.

The barony of Loughtee was created by 1609 in the Plantation of Ulster, and was archaically spelled Loughty. Its alluvial soil was recognised as the best in Cavan, and it was originally allocated to the Crown, then later to undertakers.

It was split into Upper and Lower parts in 1821.

== List of settlements ==
Below is a list of settlements in Loughtee Upper:

- Ballyhaise
- Butlersbridge
- Cavan
- Stradone
