= Declan Nerney =

Irish singer-songwriter

- Origin: Drumlish, County Longford, Ireland
- Genre: Country and Irish
- Occupations: Singer-songwriter, musician
- Instruments: Singing, guitar, banjo, steel guitar
- Years active: Late 1980s – present
- Label: Hooley Records
- Website: Official website

Declan Nerney (born c. 1959) is an Irish singer-songwriter. Born in Drumlish, County Longford, he started at the age of 16 in a local band, "The Hi-Lows". His big break came with his autobiographical song "The Marquee in Drumlish".

His early education was at the Ennybegs National School in Longford. Later he attended St Mel's College, Longford, where he sat his Leaving Certificate. He was brought up on a small farm and has a passion for vintage tractors. His niece, Una Healy, was a member of the band The Saturdays.

== Bands ==
- The Hi-Lo's
- Gene Stuart Band
- Brian Coll and the Buckaroos

== Songs and songwriting ==
Working with Henry McMahon, he has penned songs such as

- Marquee in Drumlish
- Anna from Fermanagh
- Gotta get up in the Mornin'
- Christmas Hooley
- Barry & Dunne
- Three Way Love Affair
- Hooley in the Sun
