= William Hales =

William Hales (8 April 1747 – 30 January 1831) was an Irish clergyman and scientific writer.

He was born in Cork, Ireland, the son of Samuel Hales, the curate at the cathedral church there.

He went to Trinity College, Dublin in 1764 and became a fellow there, graduating with a BA and DD. He later became professor of Hebrew at the university. In 1778 he published Sonorum doctrina rationalis et experimentalis a study, based on experiments, of Newton's theory of sounds. In 1782 he published De motibus planetarum dissertatio, another study of Newtonian theory, this time on the motions of the planets in eccentric orbits. In 1784 he had printed at his own expense Analysis aequationum, a mathematical text for which he was complimented by Joseph Louis Lagrange.

In 1788 Dr. Hales resigned as professor having been appointed Church of Ireland rector of Killeshandra, County Cavan the year before, and lived there for the rest of his life. In 1791 he married and he and his wife had two sons and two daughters. In 1798 he obtained government troops to regain control of the country around Killeshandra, following the landing by a French army at Killala. From about 1812 was chancellor of the diocese of Emly.

His best-known work is A New Analysis of Chronology, which took twenty years to complete and was finally published in three volumes (1809–1812). In this book, which deals with the chronology of the whole Bible, Hales made it his rule as far as possible to use original sources. His other works include The Inspector, or, Select Literary Intelligence for the Vulgar and Irish Pursuits of Literature (both 1799), Methodism Inspected (1803–1805), and Letters on the Tenets of the Romish Hierarchy (1813). From about 1820 or earlier he suffered from depression. He died in 1831.
