= Fulgenzio Micanzio =

Italian Lombardic Servite friar and theologian

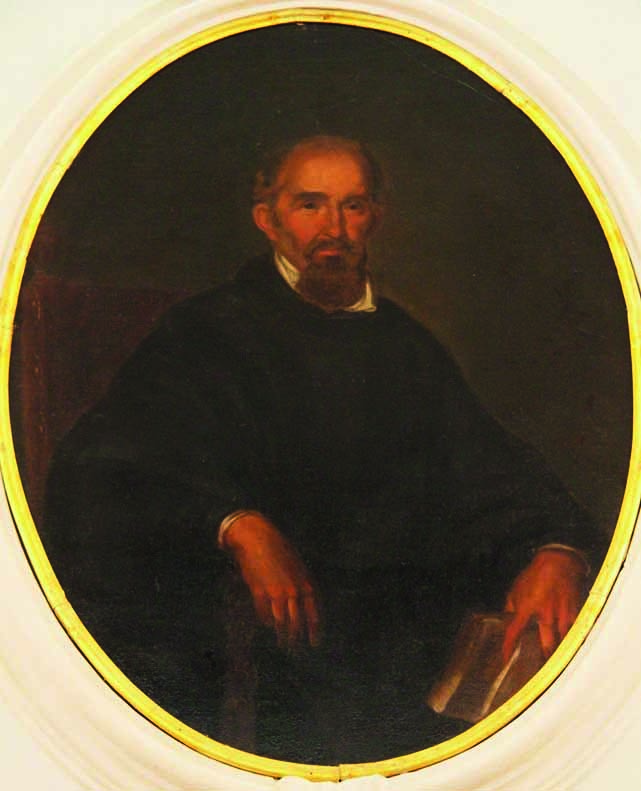
portrait of Fulgenzio Micanzio

Fulgenzio Micanzio (1570 in Passirano – 1654 in Venice) was a Lombardic Servite friar and theologian. A close associate of Paolo Sarpi, he undertook correspondence for Sarpi and became his biographer. He also was a supporter of Galileo Galilei.

Iteneu Ichanom Itnegluf was a pseudonym he used, derived from Fulgenti Monachi Veneti, “of Fulgentius the Monk of Venice”.

== Early life ==
Micanzio joined the Servite Order when still quite young, and then studied in Bologna.

He participated in the ridotto Morosini, a broad-minded Venetian intellectual circle including Sarpi and Galileo. Others to be found there were Leonardo Donà, Nicolò Contarini, and Antonio Querini.

With Sarpi he wrote in 1606 against the Carmelite Giovanni Antonio Bovio (Bovius) who had contributed works on the papal side of the debate over the Venetian Interdict. It appeared under his transparent pseudonym Itnegluf. The general of the Servites was being asked to forbid the two to enter the service of Venice.

== Diplomacy with Protestants ==
In 1609-1610 he was involved in discussions with Henry Wotton, Sarpi and Johann Baptist Lenk, acting in Venice for Christian of Anhalt. He had preached carefully scripted sermons, composed with William Bedell. He was then embarrassed by a diplomatic leak concerning the visit of Giovanni Diodati: Wotton on the advice of Sarpi and Micanzio had invited him to Venice in 1607. Some redacted correspondence of Diodati to a French recipient was passed to the Venetian authorities by the French ambassador in 1609, representing Micanzio as a Trojan horse for Protestantism in Venice. He was then forbidden to preach.

Micanzio took extensive notes on the Annales Ecclesiastici of Baronius. He with Sarpi looked to undermine the version of church history represented by the approach taken by Baronius. This put them on a track parallel to the scholars at work in England, particularly Isaac Casaubon, taking aim at the historiography favoured by the Roman Curia.

John Donne's will included a pair of portraits of Sarpi and Micanzio. Micanzio had an abiding reputation as an Anglican sympathiser, being mentioned for example (as "Father Fulgentio") in Samuel Johnson's essay on Sarpi as "administering to Dr. Duncomb, an English gentleman that fell sick at Venice, the communion in both kinds, according to the Common Prayer, which he had with him in Italian". Eleazar Duncon is known to have had conversations with Micanzio at Venice around 1648.

== Later life ==
Micanzio succeeded Sarpi as canonist of Venice. He supported more official recognition of the historical work of Andrea Morosini, alongside Sarpi's.

Micanzio as Sarpi's biographer is now considered partisan, in particular defending Sarpi from attacks by Giovanni Francesco.

== Correspondents ==
He kept up correspondence with Giovanni Francesco Biondi, in exile in England. With William Cavendish and his secretary Thomas Hobbes, a meeting in Venice led to an extended exchange of letters from 1615 to 1628, covering military and religious affairs. Hobbes translated them out of Italian for Cavendish. Ben Jonson had access to some of this correspondence, and material from Micanzio found its way into his Discoveries.

Putting out diplomatic feelers to the court of James I of England, Micanzio worked to have Francis Bacon's Essays published in Italian (1619). At this period he was also in touch with Dudley Carleton.

== Sarpi and Galileo ==
Micanzio as biographer of Sarpi made some claims on his behalf: that he had helped Galileo with his first telescope; and that Fabricius of Aquapendente had failed to give Sarpi due credit for his work on venous valves. He had also seen a tidal theory of Sarpi's. Galileo's priority claim to have seen sunspots in Padua in 1610 is documented in the same biography.

Later Micanzio made himself useful to Galileo, in investigating and surmounting the problems involved in getting his works into print. This involved both the local Inquisition and the House of Elzevir.
