= Cloughoughter Castle =

Ruined castle in County Cavan, Ireland

- Cloch Locha Uachtair
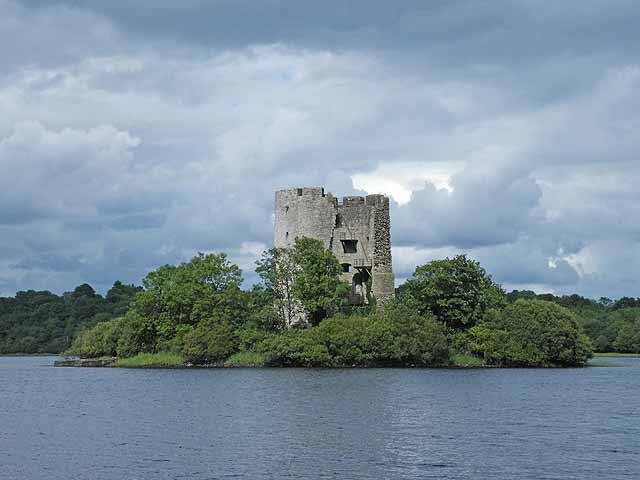
- Cloughoughter Castle sits on an island in Lough Oughter

- Location within Ireland

General information
- Location: Lough Oughter, County Cavan, Ireland
- Coordinates: 54.0187°N 7.4548°W
- Construction started: 1200 - 1224
- Demolished: 1653
- Client: William Gorm de Lacy

National monument of Ireland
- Official name: Clough Oughter Castle
- Reference no.: 602

Cloughoughter Castle (Irish: Cloch Locha Uachtair, meaning 'stone castle of Loch Uachtair') is a ruined circular castle on a small island in Lough Oughter, 4 kilometres (2.5 mi) east of the town of Killeshandra in County Cavan, Ireland.

== History ==
=== Origins and construction ===
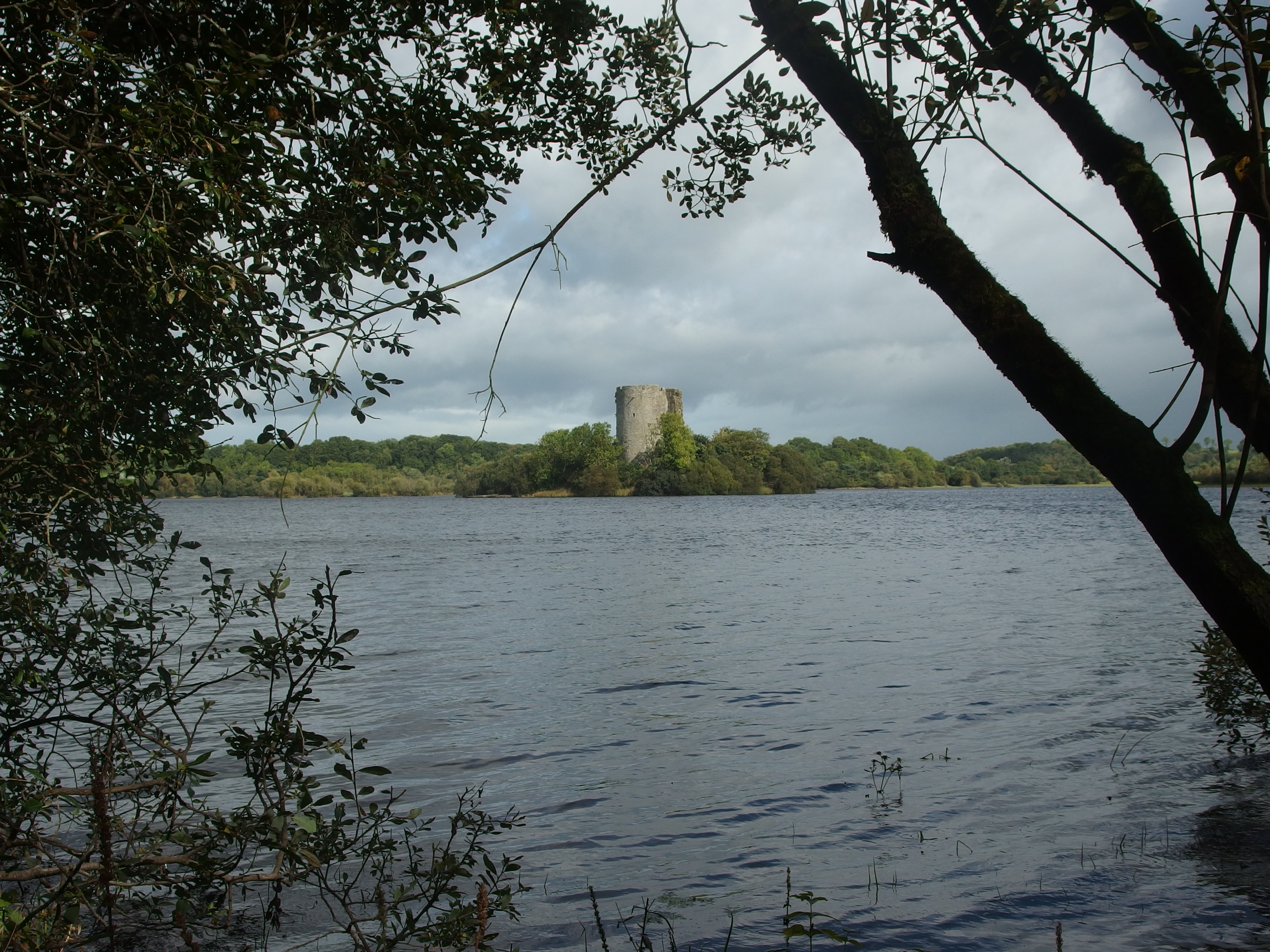
Lough Oughter surrounds the castle

The castle at Cloughoughter was built originally by the Anglo Norman de Lacy's (Lords of Meath) about 1220 as a strategic fortress. Within a few decades the area and castle was controlled by the local O'Reilly clan chiefs who held the historic Kingdom of Breifne, specifically in the part that would later be subdivided into East Breifne, roughly corresponding to present day County Cavan. The site may have a crannóg, or an artificially created island, and it is conjectured there may have been fortification there as early as the 6th century. Architectural elements from the lower two stories show construction may have started as early as the first quarter of the 13th century.

By 1233, the O'Reilly clan took possession of the Lough Oughter area and kept the fortress castle for most of the remainder of the medieval period until around 1600. The O'Reilly's retained the castle during their ongoing conflicts with the O'Rourkes, Lords of West Breifne, and with feuding members of their own O'Reilly clan. It was there that Philip O'Reilly was imprisoned in the 1360s with "no allowance save a sheaf of oats for day and night and a cup of water, so that he was compelled to drink his own urine".

=== Post-1610 ===
After the land confiscations that followed the Plantation of Ulster in 1610, Cloughoughter was granted to Captain Hugh Culme. In 1641, Philip O'Reilly, MP for Cavan and a leader of the Irish Rebellion of 1641, seized control of the castle and the Culme family house on the southern shore, which he held until a Cromwellian artillery siege bombardment in 1653. During this phase of its existence, the structure was used as a jail, with Culme himself being one of the prisoners, along with his son-in-law Henry Jones. Another prisoner was William Bedell, Bishop of Kilmore in the Church of Ireland, who died in February 1642 following his release from Cloughoughter, evidently due a very cold winter.

In 1649, Owen Roe O'Neill, commander of the Ulster Army, is said to have died at the castle. In March 1653, Cloughoughter was besieged by Commonwealth forces under Sir Theophilus Jones, brother of Henry and thus related by marriage to the Culme family. It was the last major Confederacy position to surrender on 27 April.

Cromwellian forces under Jones set up artillery in the nearby townland of Innishconnell and the damage caused by cannon shot remains to this day. Left in ruins, the castle became a frequent subject of art in the 18th and 19th centuries. Its visual impact was described in a travelogue published in The Dublin University Magazine in 1852:

It stands on a small island, scarce three hundred feet in diameter, just sufficient to contain the castle and a small margin of rock around it. The island stands in very deep water; the shores are a mile distant, wild, yet thickly wooded. The castle is a beautiful ruin, round, massive, hoary, save where mantled with rich Irish ivy. The walls are immensely thick, with embrasures and coved windows, round which "ruin greenly dwells." It is unlike most Irish castles, which are square.

Conservation efforts were begun on the castle in 1987. The structure is protected under the National Monuments Act.
