= R201 road (Ireland) =

Road in Ireland

R201 road
- Bóthar R201
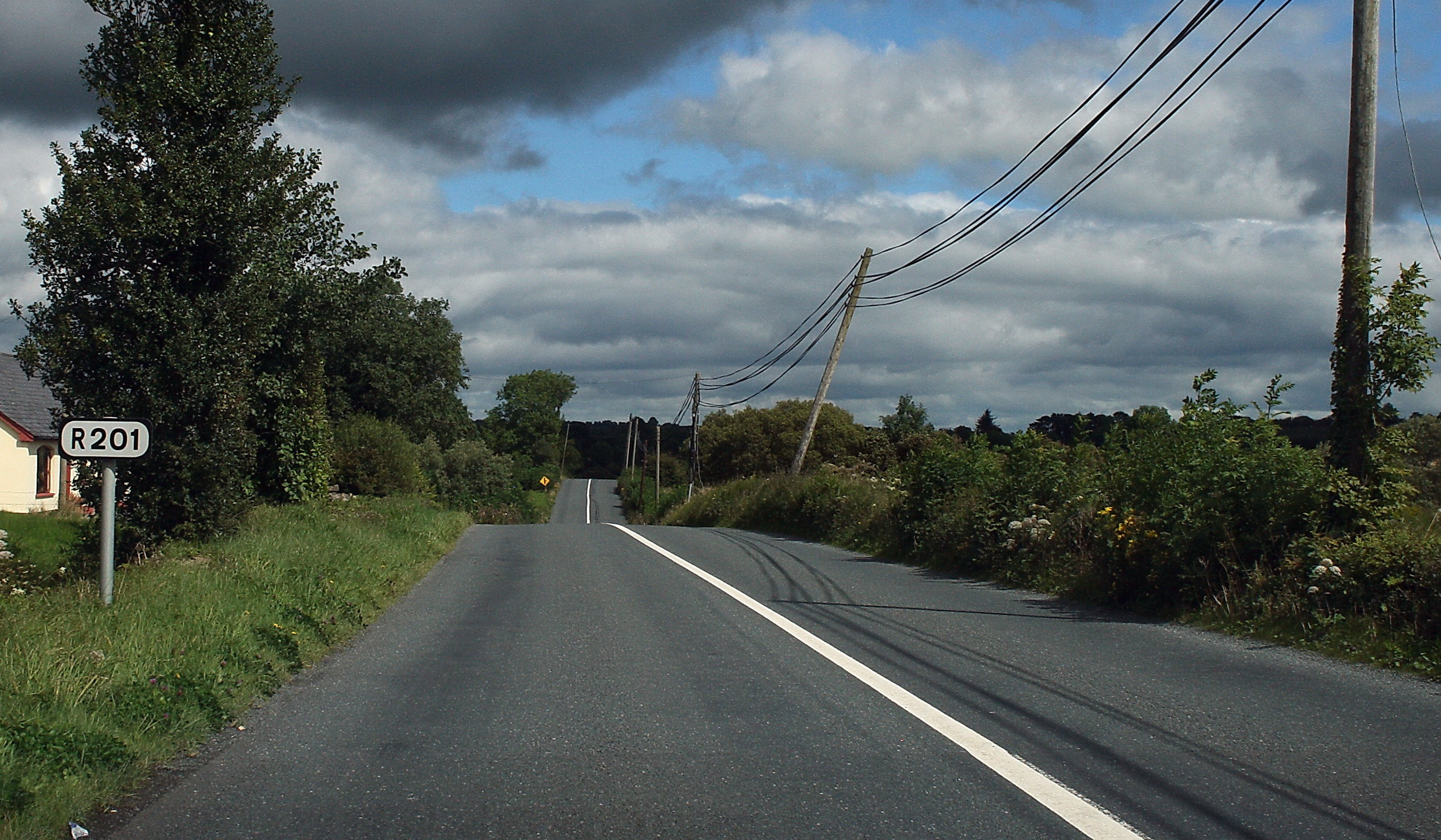
- R201 between Drumsna and Mohill

Route information
- Length: 54 km (34 mi)

Major junctions
- From: N87 at Lisnamaine, County Cavan
- R199 at Killeshandra; Enter County Leitrim; R203 at Kivvy, County Leitrim; R204 at Calloughs; R202 at Mohill
- To: N4 at Annaduff, County Leitrim

Location
- Country: Ireland
- Primary destinations: County Cavan; Milltown; Killeshandra; County Leitrim; Carrigallen; Cloone; Mohill; Drumsna

Highway system
- Roads in Ireland; Motorways; Primary; Secondary; Regional
← R200	→ R202

The R201 road is a regional road in Ireland linking Drumsna in County Leitrim to Belturbet in County Cavan.

En route it passes through several small villages as well as Mohill and Killeshandra. The road is 54 km (34 mi) long.

== See also ==
- Roads in Ireland
- National primary road
- National secondary road
