= William Bedell =

16th/17th-century Anglo-Irish churchman

The Right Reverend William Bedell

5th Provost of Trinity College Dublin
- In office 1 August 1627 – 31 July 1629
- Preceded by: William Temple
- Succeeded by: Robert Ussher

Member of Parliament for Dublin University
- In office 10 January 1628 – 24 July 1628
- Preceded by: William Temple
- Succeeded by: William Fitzgerald

Personal details
- Born: 22 September 1571 Black Notley, Essex, England
- Died: 7 February 1642 (aged 70) Cloughoughter Castle, Lough Oughter, County Cavan, Ireland
- Resting place: Kilmore Cathedral, County Cavan, Ireland
- Spouse(s): Leah Bowles (m. 1610; d. 1642)
- Children: 4
- Education: Emmanuel College, Cambridge (B.A., 1589; M.A., 1592)

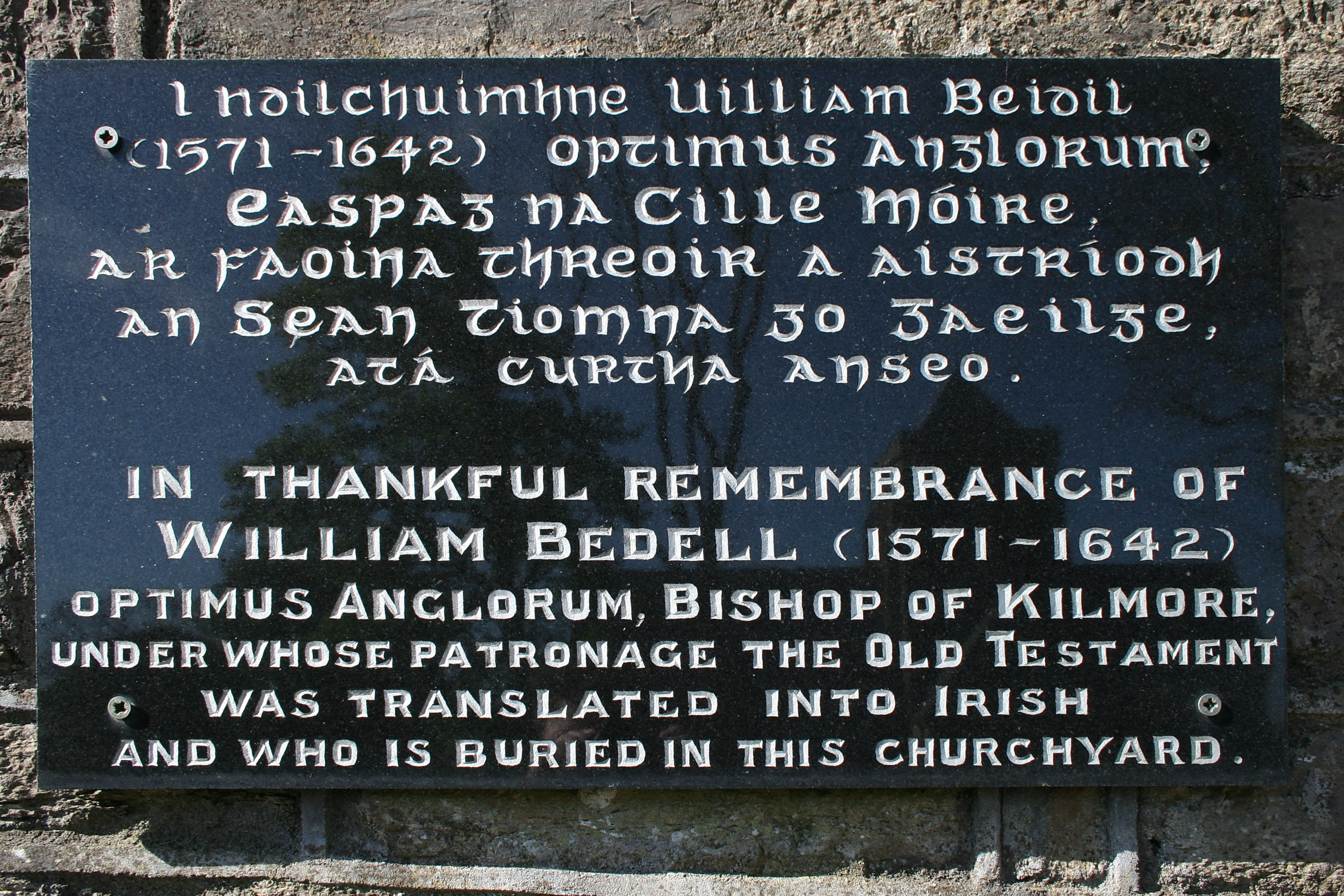
Plaque on a gate pillar of the graveyard beside Kilmore Cathedral, County Cavan.

The Rt. Rev. William Bedell, D.D. (Irish: Uilliam Beidil; 22 September 1571 – 7 February 1642), was an English Anglican bishop who served as the 5th Provost of Trinity College Dublin from 1627 to 1629. He also served as Lord Bishop of Kilmore and as a member of the Irish House of Commons from January 1628 to July 1628.

== Early life and education ==
He was born at Black Notley in Essex, England, the son of John Bedell, yeoman. He was admitted pensioner at Emmanuel College, Cambridge in 1584, where he was a pupil of William Perkins: he took B.A. in 1588/89 and M.A. in 1592, being elected a Fellow of Emmanuel College in 1593. He was ordained priest on 10 January 1596/97, by Bishop John Sterne, suffragan bishop of Colchester, and was awarded the degree of Bachelor of Divinity in 1599. He served as vicar of St Mary, Bury St Edmunds, from 1601 to 1607.

== Career ==
=== Anglican priest ===
In 1607, he was appointed chaplain to Sir Henry Wotton, then English Ambassador to Venice, where he remained for three years, acquiring a great reputation as a scholar and theologian. He translated the Book of Common Prayer into Italian, and both corresponded and was on terms of close friendship with the Venetian Republican statesman and political theorist Paolo Sarpi. Bedell wrote a series of Protestant sermons with Fulgenzio Micanzio, Sarpi's disciple.

Having returned to Bury in 1610, he married Leah, daughter of John Bowles, Esq., of Earsham, Norfolk, and widow of the Recorder of Bury St Edmunds, Robert Maw (died 1609), by whom she had already four children (two of whom survived to be raised by their stepfather). Bedell had by her three sons, William, John, and Ambrose, and a daughter Grace. In 1616, he was appointed to the nearby rectory of Horningsheath by Sir Thomas Jermyn of Rushbrooke Hall (son of Sir Robert Jermyn, benefactor of Emmanuel College). This benefice he held for twelve years.

=== Provost of Trinity College, Dublin ===
In 1627, he became Provost of Trinity College Dublin, despite having no prior connection with Ireland. The Provostship paid roughly the same as his Horningsheath rectory and he clung to his living in Suffolk until forced to surrender it on grounds of benefice. Owing to his wish to advance the Irish Reformation, Bedell decreed a chapter of the Irish-language New Testament to be read aloud during dinner by a native Irish speaker and for Irish-language prayers to be offered in his chapel.

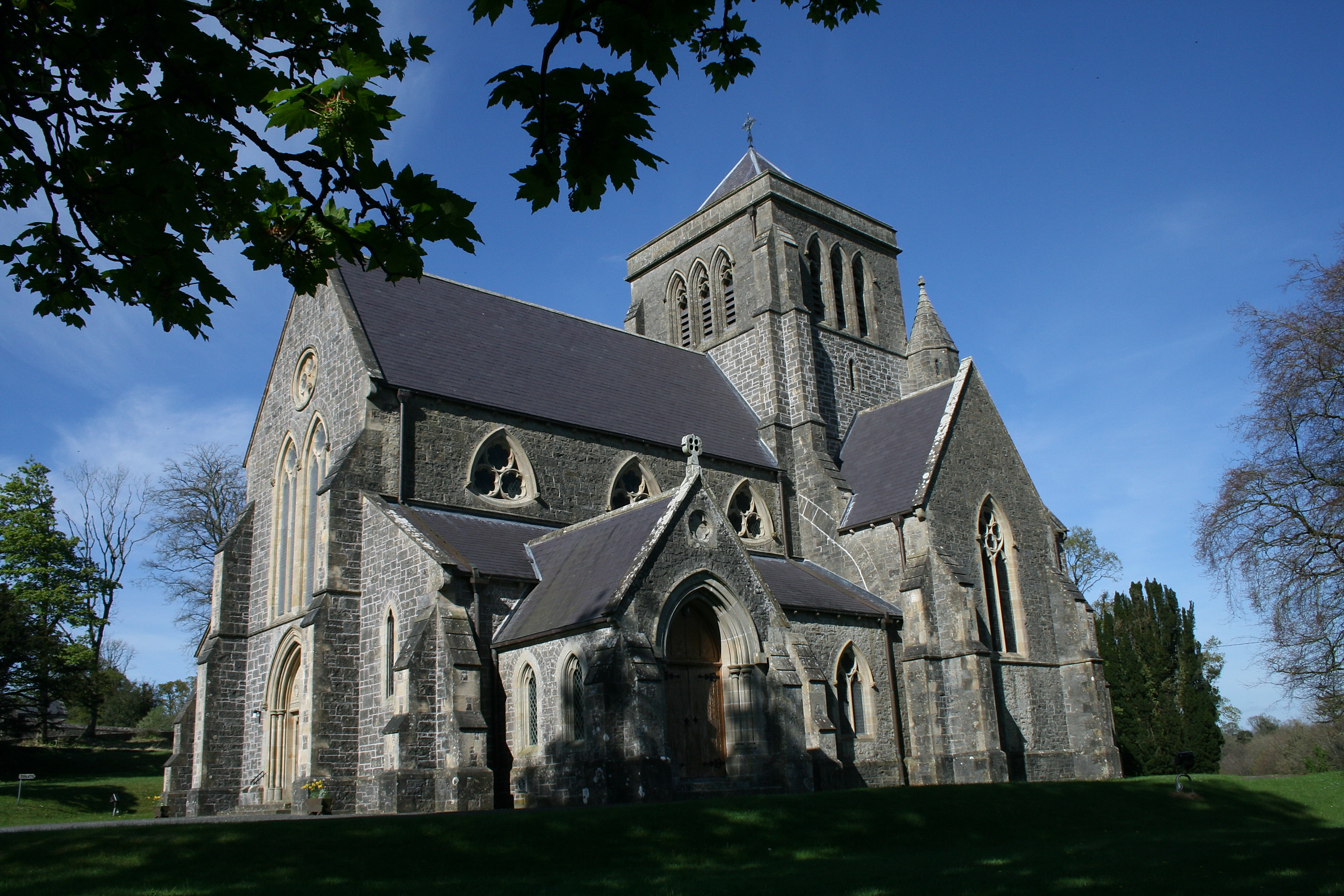
The Cathedral Church of St Fethlimidh, Kilmore (Bedell Memorial Church)

=== Bishop of Kilmore and Ardagh ===
In 1629, he was appointed to become Bishop of Kilmore and Ardagh. He set himself to reform the abuses of his diocese, encouraged the use of the Irish language by the clergy, and personally undertook many of the duties generally discharged by the bishop's lay chancellor. He is noted for commissioning the translation of the Bible into the Irish Language, which was undertaken by the Protestant Rector of Templeport parish, The Rev. Muircheartach Ó Cionga. He also chose to appoint only Irish speakers to parishes.

In 1633, he resigned the see of Ardagh, retaining the more primitive bishopric of Kilmore, where he encountered opposition from Anglicans and Catholics alike for his practice of reaching out to and trying to evangelist the native Irish. He was also determined to repair the neglected church buildings throughout the diocese, where, in 1638, he held a synod of all the Anglican clergy and officers within the diocese to discuss lax discipline. He was asked by the court of the Plantation Commission to "lay out" the town of Virginia in the south of County Cavan, after complaints from the Anglican residents there about local Anglo-Irish landlords' failure to build the town or provide a church for Anglican worship.

Bedell was a man of simple life, often walking miles on foot or travelling on horseback, travelling the dangerous byways. Bedell provided assistance to native Irish converts to Anglicanism and enable them to study for the ministry.

Bedell sided with the Catholics of Kilmore against the excess of Alan Cooke, the incumbent chancellor of the diocese. However, the church courts found that Cooke had legally acquired the right to become chancellor, and the Bishop was unable to remove him.

== Death ==
Upon the outbreak of the Irish Rebellion of 1641, the local Irish clans, led by the Chief of Clan O'Reilly, rose and took over control of the region. The O'Reillys, however, "gave comfortable words to the Bishop" and William Bedell's house at Kilmore in County Cavan was left untouched, became a refuge for those fleeing arrest by the clan. In the end, however, the O'Reillys demanded upon the dismissal of all who had taken shelter in his house, and on the bishop's refusal he was arrested and detained with some others on the nearby island castle of Lough Oughter, Cloughoughter Castle.

He was detained for several weeks and was released after signing a deposition and a remonstrance from his captors, "pleading on their behalf for graces from King Charles." William Bedell was taken into the care of his friend Denis Sheridan but the sufferings of the Bishop's imprisonment had inflicted considerable damage. Shortly after his release Bedell died from his wounds and from exposure on 7 February 1642.

Bishop Bedell was granted the dignity by Clan O'Reilly of burial next to his wife Leah at Kilmore, where he received an honourable funeral in the presence of the Clan O'Reilly's leaders.

Bishop Bedell's earliest biography was written by Bishop Gilbert Burnet in 1685 and by his elder son (ed. T. W. Jones, for the Camden Society, 1872). Bedell's Last Will and Testament is available through the UK National Archives.

== Bibliography ==
- Alexander Clogy, Memoir of the Life and Episcopate of Dr. William Bedell (London: Wertheim, Macintosh & Hunt, 1862). (Read at Google)
- A true relation of the life and death of the Right Reverend father in God William Bedell, Lord Bishop of Kilmore in Ireland. Edited by Thomas Wharton Jones. Camden Society, New Series IV (1872) (Read at HathiTrust)
- Trasna na dTonnta or A Tale of Three Cities fictionalised biography by Christina Eastwood (Mothers' Companion Publications, 2017)
- Stefano Villani, Making Italy Anglican: Why the Book of Common Prayer Was Translated into Italian (New York: Oxford University Press, 2022)

== Notes ==
Academic offices
Preceded by William Temple	Provost of Trinity College Dublin; 1627–1629	Succeeded by Robert Ussher
Church of Ireland titles
Preceded by Thomas Moigne	Bishop of Kilmore and Ardagh; 1629–1633	Succeeded by Kilmore and Ardagh separated
Preceded by Thomas Moigne	Bishop of Kilmore; 1633–1642	Succeeded by Robert Maxwell
