= Margaret Jane Scott Hawthorne =

New Zealand trade unionist, factory inspector, and public servant

Margaret Jane Scott Hawthorne (17 January 1869 – 1 May 1958) was an Irish-born New Zealand trade unionist, factory inspector, and public servant. She was among the first women appointed to the New Zealand Department of Labour’s factory inspectorate and played a significant role in the development of state oversight of women’s working conditions in the late 19th and early 20th centuries.

She was born in Cornafean, County Cavan, Ireland, on 17 January 1869, to Henry Scott, a farmer, and Anne Scott (née Kenny). In 1880 she emigrated with her family to New Zealand aboard the Halcione, arriving at Lyttelton on 29 August. The family settled near Christchurch.

Scott trained as a tailoress in Christchurch and became active in the clothing trade at a time of poor working conditions and increasing union organisation among women workers. In 1892 she was appointed secretary of the Christchurch Tailoresses' and Pressers' Union, the first woman to hold the position, a role she held until 1897. She also represented the union on the Canterbury Trades and Labour Council and was elected a vice president of the council in 1894. That same year she helped establish a co-operative workroom for women affected by a factory closure.

In 1895 she was appointed to head the Women's Branch of the New Zealand Department of Labour in Wellington, established to assist women seeking employment. Later that year she became one of the first women appointed as a factory inspector. In this role she inspected workplaces employing women and girls throughout New Zealand and enforced provisions of the Factories Act relating to sanitation, ventilation, accommodation, hours of work, and apprenticeship conditions.

In her reports to the Department of Labour, Scott advocated stronger trade union organisation among women and greater regulation of working conditions. She drew attention to disparities between unionised and non-unionised women workers and highlighted poor conditions affecting dressmakers, nurses, waitresses, and women employed in hospitality industries. For much of her career she was the only female factory inspector in the department, and although she became one of the better-paid women in the public service, her prospects for advancement remained limited compared with male colleagues. Harriet Morison joined the inspectorate in 1906, but Scott remained a senior figure until her resignation in 1910.

On 3 May 1898 she married Mark Henry Hawthorne, a boot and shoe importer. The marriage later ended in divorce. Around the time of her resignation from public service she gave birth to a daughter. On 20 December 1916 she married James Smith, a farmer, at Papakura.

Scott Hawthorne died in Auckland on 1 May 1958.
