= R203 road (Ireland) =

Road in Ireland

R203 road
- Bóthar R203

Location
- Country: Ireland

Highway system
- Roads in Ireland; Motorways; Primary; Secondary; Regional

The R203 road is a regional road in Ireland linking Arvagh in County Cavan to Carrigallen in County Leitrim.

== See also ==
- Roads in Ireland
- National primary road
- National secondary road
