= Drumlish =

Village in County Longford, Ireland

Drumlish Droim Lis
- Village
- Location in Ireland
- Coordinates: 53°49′14″N 7°46′07″W
- Country: Ireland
- Province: Leinster
- County: County Longford
- Elevation: 80 m (260 ft)

Population (2022)
  - Total: 1,124
- Time zone: UTC+0 (WET)
  - Summer (DST): UTC-1 (IST (WEST))
- Eircode (Routing Key): N39
- Irish Grid Reference: N152854

Drumlish (Irish: Droim Lis, meaning 'fort of the ridge') is a village in County Longford, Ireland. It is on the R198 road 10 km (6 mi) north of Longford town, close to the border with County Leitrim. The population of the village increased markedly between the 2002 and 2022 censuses, growing from 277 to 1,124 inhabitants in that 20-year period.

== History ==
Evidence of ancient settlement in the area includes a number of ringfort sites in Drumlish and its surrounding townlands. The remains of a portal tomb, known as the Melkagh Dolmen, lie approximately 2 km north of the village.

In 1621, King James I granted Sir George Calvert two tracts of land in the plantation of Longford, one around "Ulfeed" (now Elfeet near Newtowncashel) and the other around "Dromlish" (corresponding to the modern townlands of Drumlish, Barragh Beg, Barragh More, Derawley, Greagh, Cartrongolan, Oghil, and Enybegs). The tracts comprised the manor of Ulfeed with Calvert as lord of the manor. In 1625 the Drumlish tract was separated from Ulfeed into the manor of Baltimore, and Calvert was promoted to the Peerage of Ireland, taking the title Baron Baltimore after the manor. He later sold the land without having planted any English settlers there.

Close to the village of Drumlish is a late-18th to early-19th century mill complex, which operated as a corn milling business until the 1950s. Within the village is a monument to a local Land War resistance movement which, in 1881, successfully prevented the forced eviction of a number local tenants.

The village has grown in population significantly from the late 20th to the early 21st century, with an increase from 275 inhabitants as of the 1991 census to 429 by the 2006 census, and doubling again to 931 people as of the 2016 census. As of the 2022 census, Drumlish had a population of 1,124.

== Amenities ==
Businesses in Drumlish serve the surrounding hinterland, and there are a number of shops, a Garda station, post office, and other services. The local Roman Catholic church, St Mary's, was built in 1907. Drumlish national (primary) school, also named St Mary's, had an enrollment of more than 200 pupils as of 2019.

A music festival, the "Marquee in Drumlish", has been held annually in the village since 2009 and has hosted acts such as Nathan Carter, Ray Lynam, Mundy, Sharon Shannon, and Damien Dempsey.

== Transport ==
Bus Éireann route 463 (Carrigallen–Longford) serves Drumlish on Mondays. The nearest rail services are from Longford railway station. There is a Local Link bus service to Longford town.

== Notable residents ==
- Eddie Bohan, former senator
- Declan Nerney, singer-songwriter

== See also ==
- List of towns and villages in Ireland
