= Lough Oughter =

Lake in County Cavan, Ireland

- Loch Uachtair (Irish)
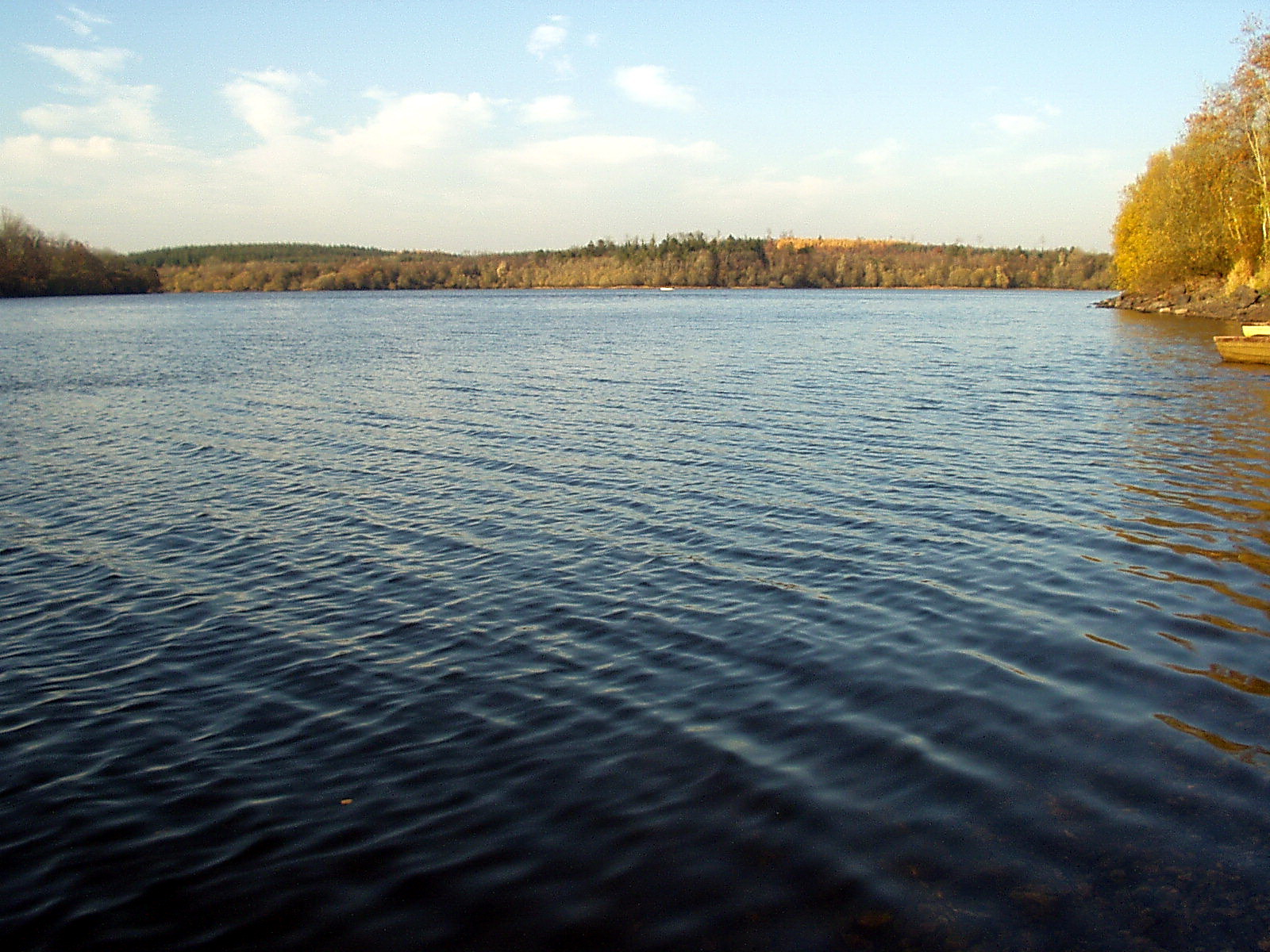
- View from Killykeen

- Location in Ireland
- Location: County Cavan
- Coordinates: 54°01′01″N 7°23′18″W
- Type: Eutrophic Glacial lake between drumlins.
- Primary inflows: Various springs and streams
- Primary outflows: River Erne Atlantic Ocean, Ballyshannon
- Basin countries: Ireland
- Designation: Ornithological, botanical, zoological interest
- Max. length: 12 km (7.5 mi)
- Max. width: 10 km (6.2 mi)
- Surface area: 8,931 ha (22,070 acres)
- Frozen: Winter of 2010/2011

Ramsar Wetland
- Designated: 7 June 1996
- Reference no.: 853

Lough Oughter (Irish: Loch Uachtair) is a lake, or complex of lakes, in County Cavan covering more than 8,900 hectares (22,000 acres). The complex of lakes lies on the River Erne, and forms the southern part of the Lough Erne complex. The lakes are bounded roughly by Belturbet in the north, Cavan town to the east, Crossdoney to the south and Killeshandra to the west.

== Geography and ecology ==
A 1977 report by An Foras Forbartha (precursor to the Environmental Protection Agency) describes Lough Oughter as the "best inland example of a flooded drumlin landscape" in Ireland, and details the varied biological communities of the area. According to a National Parks and Wildlife Service summary of the site, there is nowhere else in the country with such "mixture of land and water occur over a comparable area", with many species of wetland plants, which are common to Lough Oughter, characterised as "infrequent elsewhere". The number of whooper swans which winter in the area represents about 3% of the total European population while the lake also houses 10% of the estimated breeding total of Great Crested Grebes in the Republic, having become almost extinct in the 19th century.

As an angling lake, Lough Oughter is designated as a suitable wetland for inclusion in the Ramsar List of Wetlands of International Importance. The Lough Oughter complex, along with Killykeen Forest Park, are designated Natura 2000 habitats, Special Areas for Conservation (SAC) and Special Protection Areas (SPA) under EU legislation. Lough Oughter is part of the UNESCO Marble Arch Caves Global Geopark.

The main threats to the quality of the site, according to the National Parks and Wildlife Service, are water pollution sources like run-off from fertiliser and slurry applications, and sewage discharge which have raised the nutrient status of some lakes to hypertrophic. Afforestation has also resulted in some loss of wetland habitat and feeding grounds for some wintering birds.

== Recreation and tourism ==
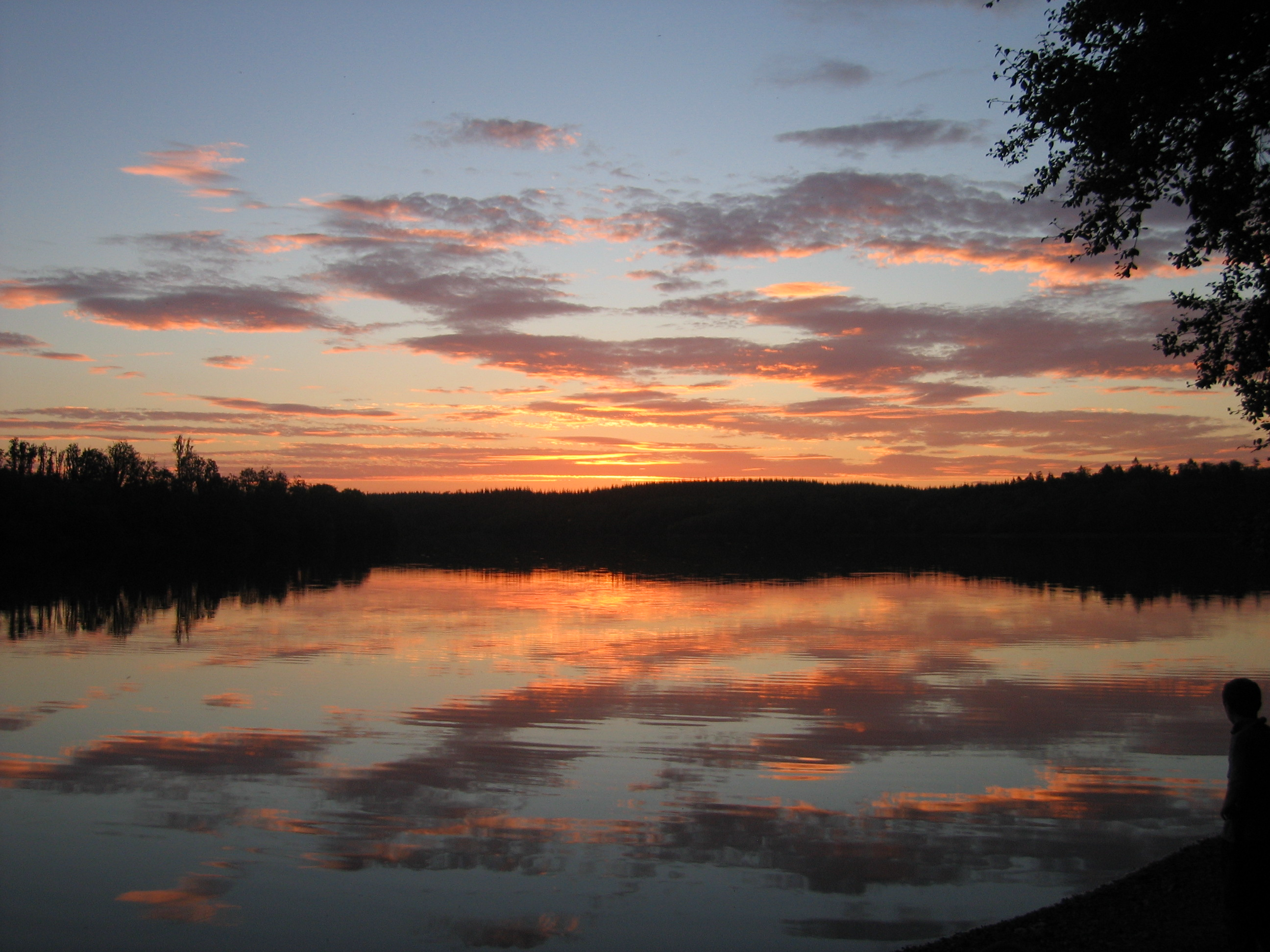
Lake at sunset

The Lough Oughter complex of lakes and wetlands is an ecotourism destination. Killykeen Forest Park, managed by Coillte, is a woodland of 240 hectares (590 acres) located five miles from Cavan town, and sitting alongside the Lough Oughter system.

== Historic settlement ==
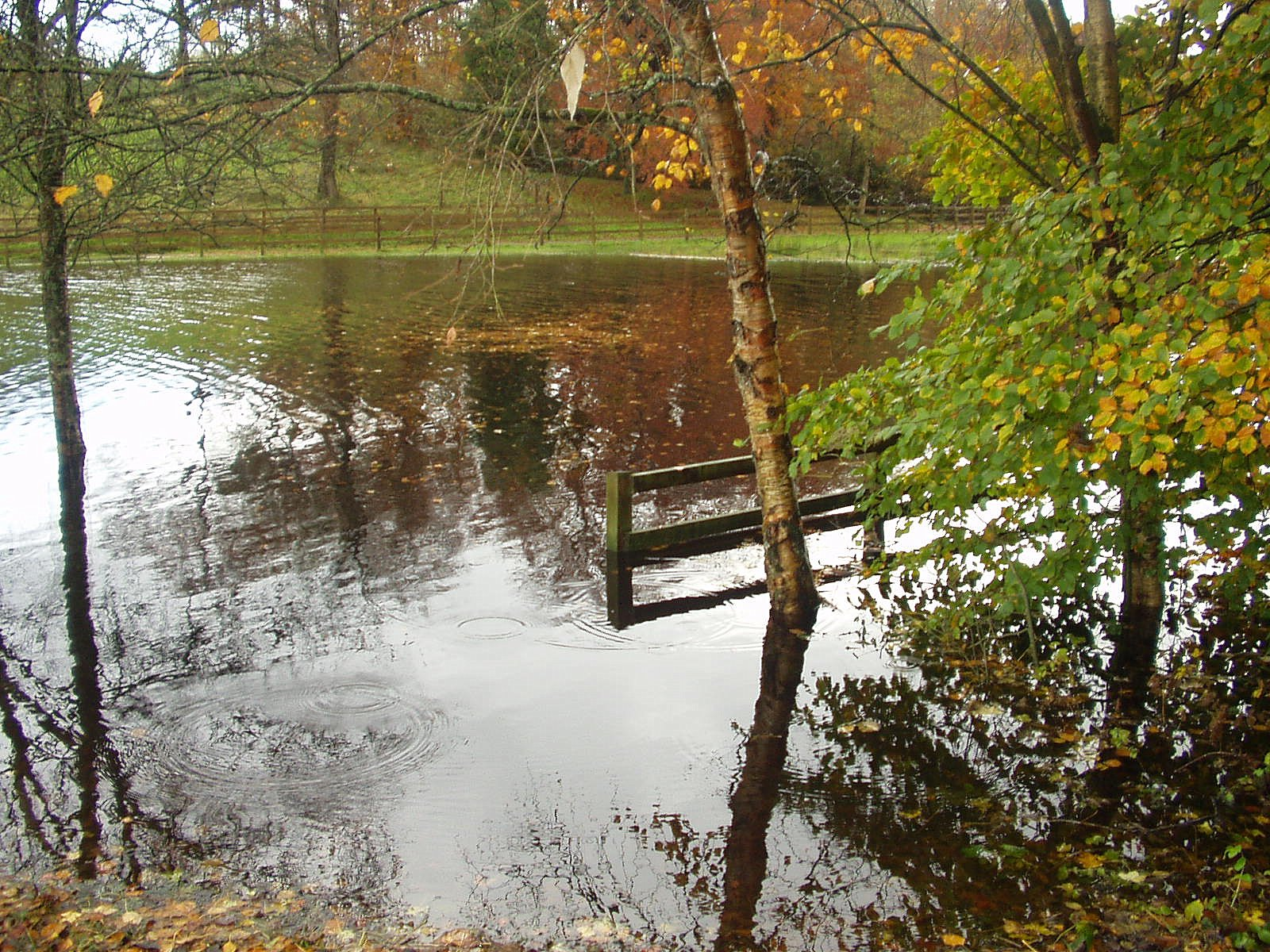
Flooding following heavy rainfall in Autumn 2002

Trinity Island, located on Lough Oughter, was once home to a monastic settlement, and a friary on the island dates from the 12th or 13th century.

Following the arrival of the Anglo Normans, Clogh Oughter Castle was also built in the area, also in the 13th century. It stands on a tiny island in Lough Oughter, and is circular in construction. Measuring approximately 15.5 metres in outside diameter, it is almost 18 metres high. The nearest shore is approximately 130 metres away, close to the narrowest part of the lough at Inishconnell Rinn Point. During the seventeenth century, the castle changed hands several times and was one of the last defended castles to hold out during the Confederate Wars. Before this, Clogh Oughter Castle was used as a prison, and the Anglican Bishop of Kilmore, William Bedell was held hostage here. Irish Confederate general Eoghan Ruadh Ó'Néill is reputed to have died here in 1649 and was secretly brought to Trinity Island for burial. The castle was captured in 1653 and its walls breached by cannon shot. It has remained unoccupied ever since.

During the late nineteenth century, water levels on Lough Oughter were lowered to alleviate flooding of low lying farmland. However, a 2008 proposal by Waterways Ireland suggested that levels be raised to facilitate tourism and allow pleasure boats to gain access into the lough via the River Erne from Belturbet to Killashandra.

== See also ==
- List of loughs in Ireland
- Eutrophication
