= Carrigallen =

Village in County Leitrim, Ireland

Carrigallen Carraig Álainn
- Village
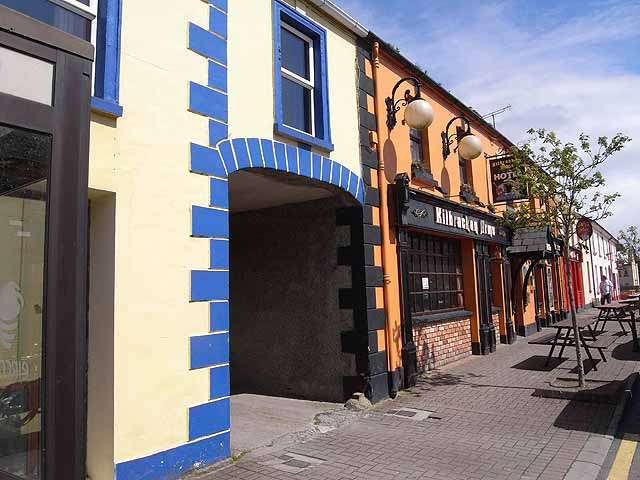
- The Kilbracken Arms
- Motto: As Lámha a Chéile
- Location in Ireland
- Coordinates: 53°58′38″N 7°38′45″W
- Country: Ireland
- Province: Connacht
- County: County Leitrim
- Barony: Carrigallen
- Elevation: 76 m (249 ft)

Population (2016)
  - Total: 387
- Irish Grid Reference: H232031
- Website: www.carrigallen.com

Carrigallen (Irish: Carraig Álainn, meaning 'beautiful rock') is a small village in County Leitrim, Ireland. It is on the R201 and R203 roads in the east of the county, 19 km west of Cavan town. As of 2016, the village had a population of 387. The village is in a civil parish of the same name.

== Location ==
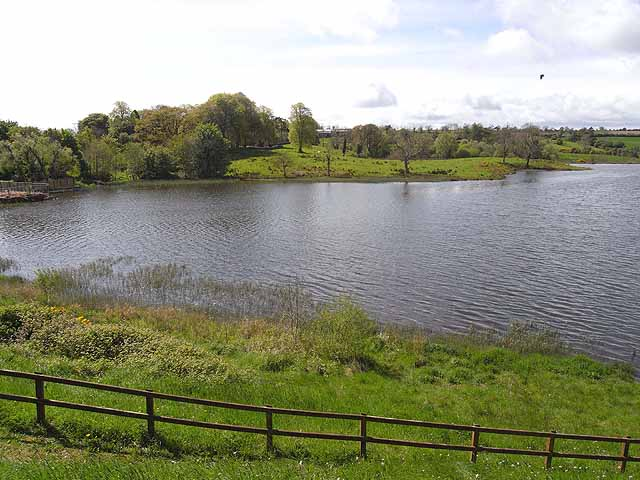
Carrigallen Lough

The village is set between the north and south shores of Carrigallen Lough in South Leitrim and is a centre for angling. Rockfield Lake is about 4 kilometres (2.5 mi) east of Carrigallen.

Killahurk Ring Fort is 2 kilometres (1.2 mi) from the village. The ringfort is 0.5 km (0.3 mi) west of Carrigallen Lough and is a good example of an early medieval enclosure.

== History ==
St. Patrick is said to have passed through this region. While here he baptised followers at St. Patrick's holy well in Aghawillin and before leaving the region he blessed the ancient graveyard of Errew. The 16th century graveyard is situated about 3 km (2 mi) east of Carrigallen overlooking Gulladoo Lake. Throughout at least the 19th and 20th centuries, a number of annual fairs were held at Carrigallen on – 12 April, 7 May, 28 May, 9 August, 8 October, and 31 December.

== Theatre ==
In the centre of the town is the Corn Mill Theatre & Arts Centre which presents a programme of drama (amateur and professional), variety shows, music and poetry. While a tradition of drama in Carrigallen goes back to the late 1800s, the present group was founded in 1963 as "The Community Players". In 1989, the group opened the theatre, and the name of the group was changed to the Corn Mill Theatre Company. In 1999, works took place on the foyer, dressing rooms, rehearsal and storage areas.

== Transport ==
Carrigallen is served by Bus Éireann four days per week. Different destinations are served each day. Route 465 serves Cavan on Tuesdays, route 464 serves Enniskillen on Thursdays, and route 462 serves Sligo along two different routes on Fridays and Saturdays.

A Longford Westmeath Roscommon Local Link service to Longford (route LD63 which replaced the former Bus Eireann route 463) operates on two different routes on Mondays and Wednesdays.

== Schools and churches ==
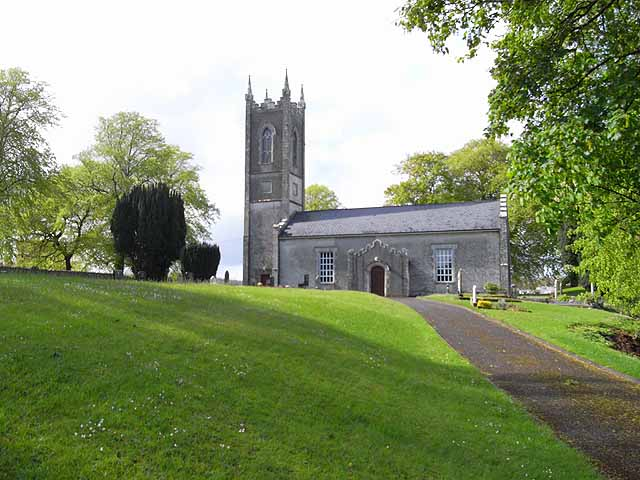
Church of Ireland, Carrigallen

Schools include Saint Mary's National School and Carrigallen Vocational School. Churches include: Saint Mary's Church, which is Catholic and was built in 1846; a Church of Ireland church built in 1814; and a Presbyterian church.

== People ==
- Margaret Haughery (1813–1882) lived here. She was a philanthropist who opened orphanages in the New Orleans area, and was known as "Margaret of New Orleans" and "the mother of orphans". Her birthplace, located in Tully, is a tourist attraction.
- John Godley, 3rd Baron Kilbracken (1920-2006), an author and journalist, lived at Killegar House, the ancestral seat of the Godley family. His grandfather, Arthur Godley, 1st Baron Kilbracken (1847-1932), was Permanent Under-Secretary of State for India.
- Patrick McGoohan (1928–2009) was born in Queens in New York City on 19 March 1928, the son of Irish immigrant parents Rose (née Fitzpatrick) and Thomas McGoohan. Shortly after he was born, the family moved back to Ireland, where they lived in the Mullaghmore area of Carrigallen.

== See also ==
- List of towns and villages in the Republic of Ireland
