= Killoe =

Parish in County Longford, Ireland

Killoe Cill Eo
- Parish
- Location in Ireland
- Coordinates: 53.75°N 7.707°W
- Country: Ireland
- Province: Leinster
- County: County Longford
- Time zone: UTC+0 (WET)
  - Summer (DST): UTC-1 (IST (WEST))
- Irish Grid Reference: N135750

Killoe (Irish: Cill Eo, meaning 'church of the yew') is a rural community and parish in County Longford, Ireland, located approximately 6 miles north of Longford Town. It is home to Cairn Hill (locally known as Cornhill or Corn Hill) or Carn Clonhugh - the highest peak in County Longford.

It is bordered by Newtownforbes, Drumlish, Ballinalee, Edgeworthstown, and Longford Town.

There are two small villages in Killoe at Ennybegs and Cullyfad. Killoe has a number of amenities, including community centre buildings in Ennybegs and Cullyfad, a national school (St. Theresa's National School) at Clontumpher, several shops and two pubs. Churches include St. Marys Catholic Church (Ennybegs), St. Olivers Catholic Church (Cullyfad), and St. Catherines Church of Ireland (Killoe Glebe). The civil parish of Killoe was historically covered by two baronies, Granard and Longford, included a minimum of 91 townlands, and had an area of 16,780 hectares (41,500 acres). The modern ecclesiastical parish of Killoe consists of 38 townlands.

Sporting clubs in the parish include Killoe Celtic soccer club, and Killoe Young Emmets Gaelic Football club comprising Killoe Senior Club, Killoe Óg Minor Club and Killoe Ladies Club.

Ancient monuments in the area include a number of ringforts and mass rocks. A more recent memorial unveiled in 2012, commemorates the actions of local man James Farrell who helped to save two local women along with others during the sinking of the Titanic in 1912.

The gates of the Carrigglas Manor and Estate, known locally as the "Gandon Gates", were designed by architect James Gandon in the early 19th century.
