= Longford (County Longford barony) =

Longford An Longfort (Irish)
- Barony
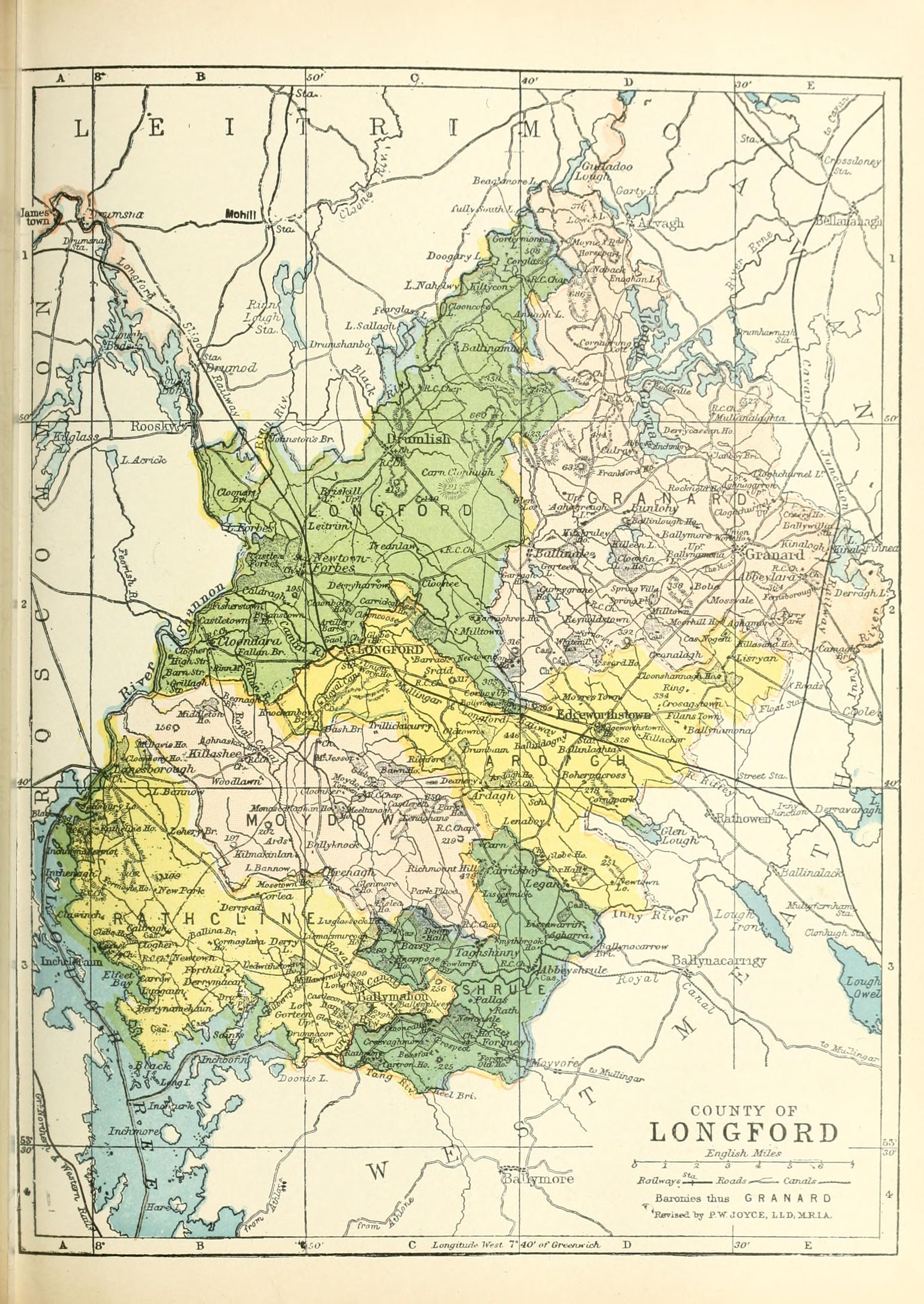
- Baronies of County Longford. Longford is shaded pale green.
- Sovereign state: Ireland
- County: Longford

Area
  - Total: 231.65 km^{2} (89.44 sq mi)

Longford (Irish: An Longfort) is a barony in County Longford, Ireland.

== Etymology ==
Longford barony derives its name from the town of Longford (from Irish Longphort Uí Fhearghail, "O'Fergal's riverside camp".

== Location ==
Longford barony is located in northwestern County Longford: east of the River Shannon, north of the River Camlin, south of the Rinn River and Black River, and west of the Longford Hills.

== History ==
Carn Clonhugh was a ritual centre for the Clan Hugh (Clann Aoidh).

== List of settlements ==
Below is a list of settlements in Longford barony:

- Ballinamuck
- Cloondara
- Drumlish
- Longford (northern part)
- Newtownforbes
