= Moydow =

Village near Longford town, Ireland

Moydow Maigh Dumha
- Village
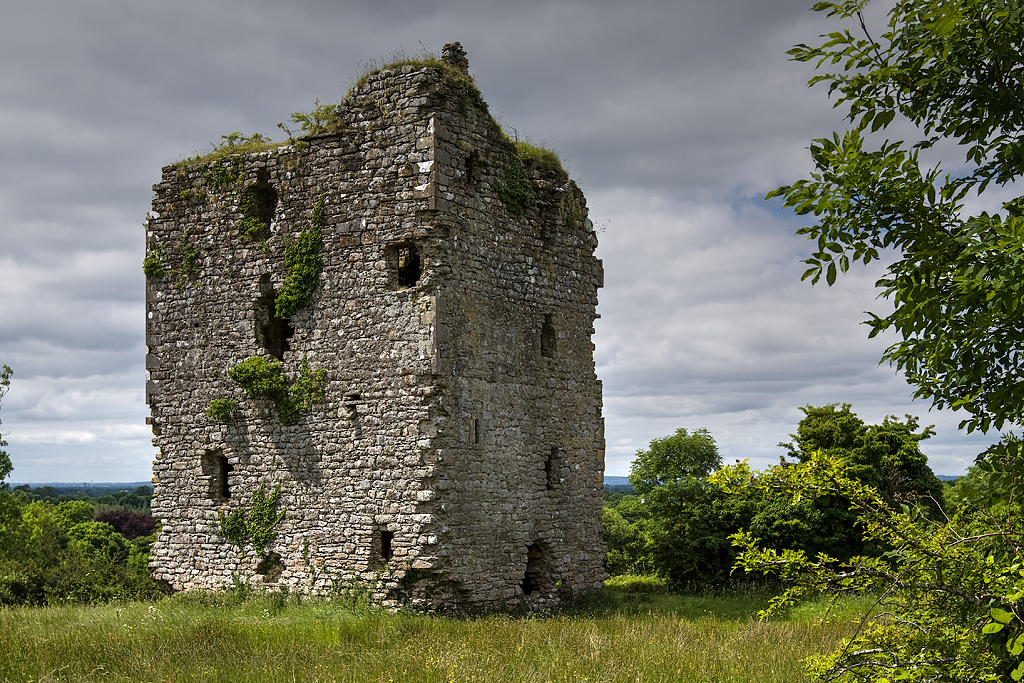
- Moydow (Castlerea) Castle

- Location in Ireland
- Coordinates: 53°39′50″N 7°47′17″W
- Country: Ireland
- Province: Leinster
- County: County Longford
- Elevation: 82 m (269 ft)
- Time zone: UTC+0 (WET)
  - Summer (DST): UTC-1 (IST (WEST))
- Irish Grid Reference: N256719

Moydow (Irish: Maigh Dumha, meaning 'plain of the mound') is a village on the outskirts of Longford town in County Longford, Ireland.

Moydow contains an old disused post office, a disused schoolhouse used as a community centre, two pubs, a Roman Catholic church and a disused Church of Ireland church.

== History ==
Moydow was once part of a territory known as Tethbae. The barony was formed from the territories of Clanawlye (Ardagh and Moydow), and parts of the territories of Moybrawne (Taghshinny parish), Clanconnor (part Kilcommock, part Cashel parishes), and Muintergalgan.

Its ancient name was Cill-Modhint after St. Modhint's church, which was destroyed by fire in 1155. Also in this area are the ruins of the oldest nunnery in Ireland.

According to the History of County Longford (published 1898), in 858 BC an army composed of Lagenians, Connacians, and the southern Hy Nialls, marched to Fiachla, under the conduct of Mael-saghlin, the son of Maelrony, and encamped at Moydumha, in the vicinity of Ardagh.

The ancient name of this parish was Kilmodhain, or Kilmacdhumha, so called from being the kil or cell of St. Modhain, or Modiud the Simple, whose feast is celebrated on 12 February, according to the Lives of the Saints. St. Modan lived about the year 591, when he was made a bishop of Carnfurbuidhe. He had erected the Priory of Moydow, no ruins of which now exist. It is said that one Brclaus, a disciple and presbyter of St. Patrick, was a presbyter here for some time after its erection. O'Donovan says this was one of the oldest priories in Ireland.

The parish comprises 45,771 statute acres, of which about 1,203 are bog. A peculiar kind of stone, called puddingstone, is found on the isolated mountain of Slieve Gouldry, on the southern confines of the parish, and there is a quarry of freestone, which was worked for flags.

=== Folklore ===
A nearby mountain, known as Slieve Gauldry or Castlerea Mountain, was in ancient times called Brigh Leath (Bri Leath). A legend about it appears in the Book of Tara. A comely chieftain's son, named Leath, loved Bri, the beautiful daughter of a powerful chief who lived on this hill, then called Tu Uynahearinaghtrihi. Leath came with his servants to Midir and approached her father, asking for Bri's hand. Midir refused to give her away, whereupon a fight ensued, and Leath was killed. Bri, who had fled her father's house, returned and died of a broken heart.

=== Saint Cremhthann of Moydow ===
Extracts relating to Saint Cremtand or Saint Cremhthann of Moydow can be found in the book Lives of the Irish Saints by John O'Hanlon, published 1923.

== Built heritage ==
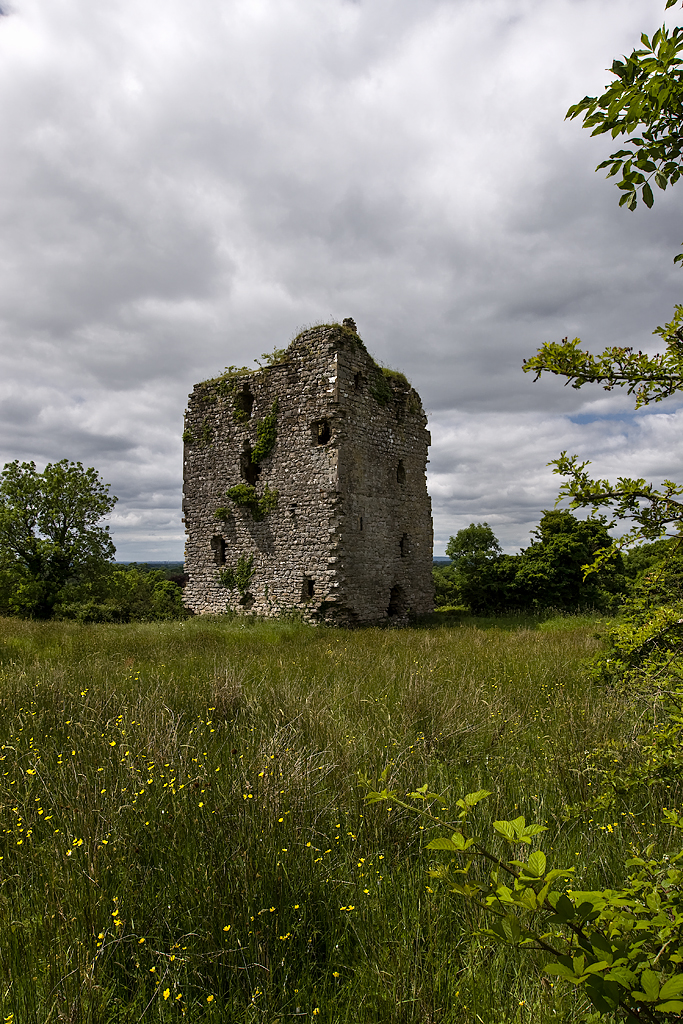
Moydow Castle, also known as Castlerea Castle

=== Moydow Castle ===
At the foot of the Slieve Gauldry Hills, one mile from Moydow Village, is a ruined castle. Moydow Castle has been in the ownership of the Higgins family of the adjacent Castlerea House for the last 100 years. There is a chalybeate spring here too but is not used for medicinal purposes. According to records, in 1260, John de Verdon built the castle at Moydow, immediately behind Bawn House. By 1295, Sefraid O fergail had destroyed it. This castle was levelled at the same time as Barry and Camagh castles. As of the 14th and 16th centuries, it was again occupied, according to records.

The castle itself is constructed on solid ground with rock walls two feet thick. On the right-hand side of the structure is an arched doorway. Inside, on the ceiling above the inside doorway, there is a hole about a foot square. Common to many castles, including this type of tower castle, the opening is for viewing from above those entering the castle below. This opening, called a "murder hole," is used to stop unwelcome guests before they can proceed any further inside. By comparing this castle to other similar tower castles, we can assume that the lower floor was mainly a gathering place. The second floor was likely the dining area, the third floor the kitchen and the upper floors for sleeping. The Castle has been in the ownership of the Higgins family from the nearby Castlerea House for over a hundred years.

=== Bawn House ===
Another notable residence was Bawn House, near Moydow, now derelict. It was the home of the Monfort family for most of the eighteenth century and then passed to Caleb Barnes Harman, a land agent on the Harman family estate. He was fatally shot during a robbery at the house in January 1796.

Immediately behind Bawn House stand the ruins of the ancient Castle of Moydow, or Moydumha. Some people suppose that these ruins formed the old Priory of St. Modiud the Simple, but this is not the case. The ruins now standing were surrounded by a deep fortified moat, and the building itself consisted of the usual tower and square keep. This, in fact, was the ancient castle of the Lord of Moydumha, sacked in the thirteenth century at the time that Barry and Camagh Castles were levelled.

There is a tragic story told in connection with this house. In 1770 the Whiteboys were strong in numbers and determined in action all over Ireland. As history tells, they were first called "Levellers," from the fact of their assembling at night and letting the fences with which the landlords endeavoured to enclose certain commons that had previously belonged to the people. But the pent-up agony of a long persecuted race having once found vent was not to be easily crushed, and for a period of twenty years the Whiteboys were the only protection the unfortunate Catholics had in their troubles. These men, most of whom banded together for the one noble object—to relieve their distressed condition—when going to perform any act of violence, blackened their faces and put on a white shirt over their dress as a disguise, from which they were called "Whiteboys." For many years, they, by the very terror of their name, restrained the landlords and agents who were inclined to oppress the people—which was most essential to the very existence of the latter; and when they were at length condemned by church priests, it was because unscrupulous persons had, by bloody acts, turned the association to their own base purposes.

About the year 1780, there lived in Bawn House a certain Captain Barnes, agent over several estates in the neighbourhood of Moydow, and famed among the people as an uncompromising exterminator of the tenants, whom he ruled with a rod of iron. On a certain November night, after collecting the rents of his estates, he was engaged upstairs with his clerk in counting his money and making out his accounts. While thus engaged, a thundering summons came to the front door, and immediately divining the cause, Barnes and his clerk piled up a lot of furniture on the main stairway, first locking the room in which the money was left. The summons to open the door not being answered, the men, who were Whiteboys that had previously committed several acts of violence in the neighbourhood, burst it in with a tree log, which they used as a ram, and were about to rush upstairs when Barnes fired down on them. The shot did not kill anyone, and the leader of the party, seeing Barnes about to fire again, immediately took aim and shot him dead on the top of the stairs. The rest then ran up and knocked the clerk on the head, leaving him senseless, whilst they entered Barnes' office and abstracted every penny he had received that day. The military authorities, hearing of the attack, turned out next day from Longford and captured a dozen of men, of whom several were hanged on the evidence of an informer, who did not receive any of the money taken from Barnes and turned king's evidence on that account.

=== Mount Jessop ===
Extract from History of County Longford (1891):

Another family worthy of notice, in days past, were the Jessops, not of Doory Hall, but of Mount Jessop. They were owners of a fine tract of ground in Moydow, which they lost by their inveterate passion for gambling about some years ago. They are said to have become possessed of the estate in a curious way. It is told that one day, during the plantation regime, there came a discharged soldier to the town of Longford, who asked to be shown certain portions of land in Moydow which he was after being granted for his services to the Parliament. The man that met him was a butler in the local inn in Longford, who was possessed of some money; and he volunteered to show the discharged trooper the lands. He conducted him up to the top of Castlerea, or Slieve Gauldry Mountain, and pointed out to him the bleakest and most uninviting portions of that sterile hill. The man was much disgusted with the prospect before him, and said if he saw any man who would give him £5 and a horse to carry him to Dublin, he would sell him his right to the lands. The butler took him at his word, handed him out the money, and got him a horse, and in return received the title-deeds of a property which he converted into the Mount Jessop Estate, being the first of its owners himself. "Ill got, ill gone," is, however, an old maxim, and the last owner of the lands put them beyond his reach for ever, by risking them on a game of cards at a ball in the Military Barracks of Longford, and losing them, as well as every penny he was possessed of, in one night. The young Francis Jessop, of Mount Jessop, committed suicide whilst High Sheriff of County Longford (1836).

=== Abbeyderg Monastery ===
Extract from History of County Longford, published 1891:

Distant about five miles (8 km) due south from Longford, is the Cemetery of Abbey Dearg, in which stands the crumbling ruins of what was once a priory for Regular Canons of the Order of St. Augustine. This priory was founded about the year 1205, by Grormgal O'Quinn, Lord of Rath-cline, and was dedicated to St. Peter; and in 1217, the first abbot of the monastery, Osin by name, died and was interred here. On the death of Brendan Jifagodaig, Bishop of Ardagh, in 1255, his remains also were interred in this priory, which continued to exist until 1550, when it was suppressed, and the buildings and land, to the value of £2 annually, Irish money, were bestowed on one Nicholas Alymor, an English soldier. The existing ruins of, the Abbey of Dearg prove it to have been a most perfect monastic structure. The plate which is not a very perfect one, owing to the entire demolition of the main walls of the building, and the complete covering of the walls, showing the eastern and southern window by a thick coat of impenetrable ivy. The ruins have been examined minutely, and the conclusion is that it consisted of a main chancel (of chapel), vestry, dining-room, dormitory, and a number of cells. The principal walls of all, except the southern and eastern portion of the chancel, are now demolished to a height of two or three feet.

=== Moydow COI Church ===
The Church of Ireland church is a small plain building without a tower, erected about 80 years since, and was repaired in 1831 by aid of a loan of £50. Thomas Jessop, born in 1741, inherited Mount Jessop from his brother in 1784. He presented a bell, value £10.12.0, to Moydow Church, which may be the one still in use. He died 24 April 1825, and was buried at Moydow cc38-9

The church was abandoned in 1987 and remains empty.

=== Catholic church and school ===
The Catholic church is located in the centre of the Moydow village, and the date stone on the front of the building states 1838. Moydow and Ardagh are part of the same parish and the parish priest's residence is located in Ardagh. A former national school (date stone 1880) is located beside the church. The school closed in the 1960s and is currently used as a community center.

== Transport ==
Bus Éireann route 466 serves the village on Saturday afternoons only. There is no morning journey, so it is not possible to travel to Longford and back on the same day.

== Local townlands ==
Aghinaspick, Aughine, Ballinvoher, Barroe, Bawn, Bawn Mountain, Bunalough, Castlerea, Castlerea Mountain, Cloghan, Cloonevit, Cloonker, Cloonmucker, Commock, Curraghmore, Garranboy, Keelogalabaun, Lisgurry, Meeltanagh, Mollyroe, Monascallaghan, Mountjessop, Moydow Glebe, Nappagh, Toneen.

== Census records ==
The 1639 Census showed that McGiff was a principal name in Moydow. McGiff Cross is still an area of Moydow in Longford.

By order of the Governors of Ireland, a census of this Ireland was taken in the year 1659, when the population of the Moydow barony was found to be laid out as follows: There were 182 Irish and 4 English. The principal Irish families were: – The Caseys, 12 people; Oormicks and MacCormicks, 19; Donlans, 7; Dooners, 5; Duffs, 6; Farrells, 23; Kennys, 16; Morrows, 7; Powers, 6; Keegans, 7; and M'Evoys, 6. The local gentry were : – Thomas Newcomen, of Ballinamore; and "Walter Tuite, of Castlereagh.

1660 The McGaver Family.

Flax growers in Moydow & Longford – 1796.

== See also ==
- List of towns and villages in Ireland
