= Carn Clonhugh =

Mountain in Longford, Ireland

- Carn Clainne Aodha (Irish)
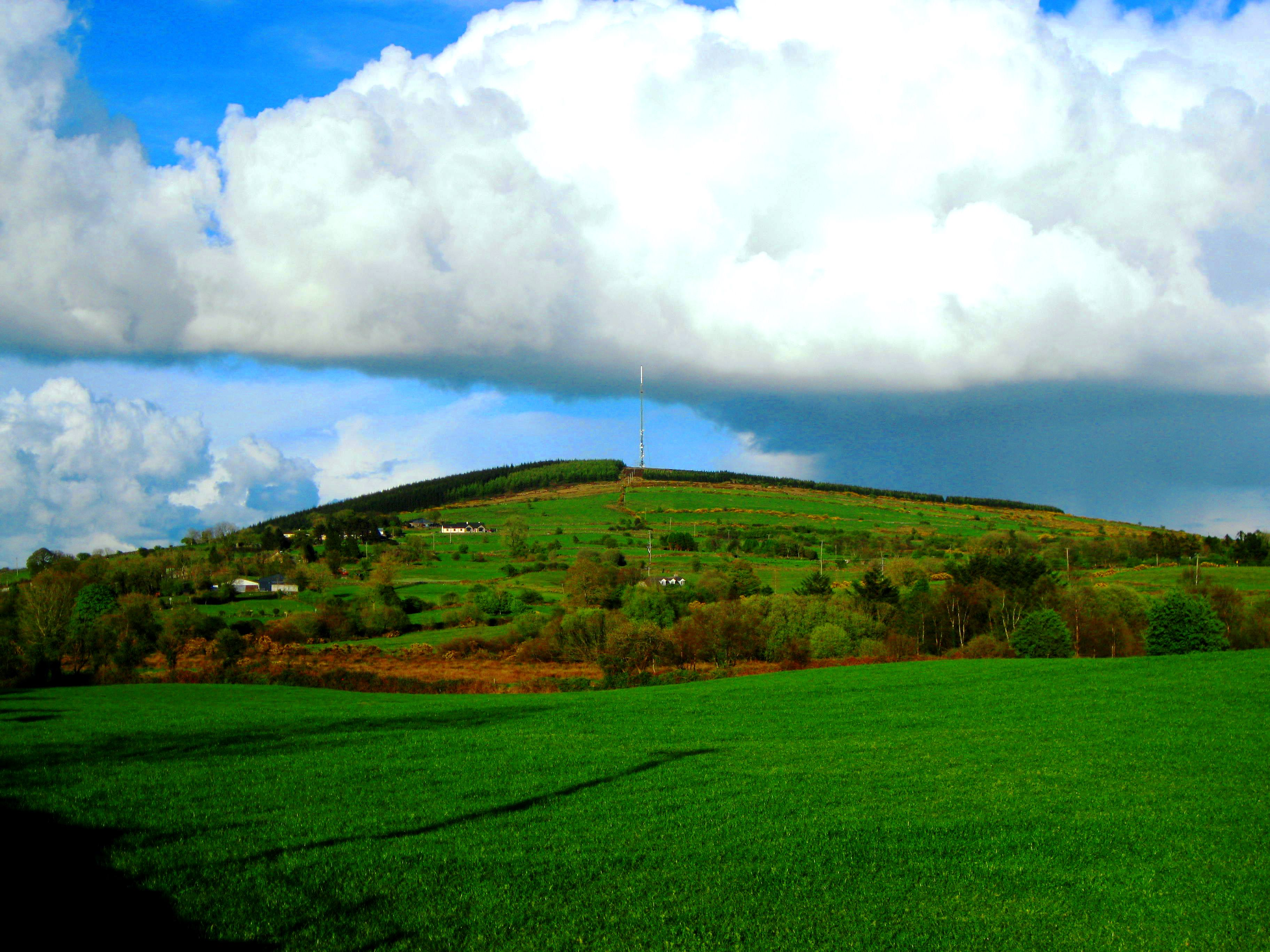
- Cairn Hill

Highest point
- Elevation: 278 m (912 ft)
- Prominence: 200 m (660 ft)
- Listing: County Top (Longford), Marilyn
- Coordinates: 53°48′28″N 7°42′52″W

Geography
- Location within island of Ireland
- Location: Killoe, County Longford, Ireland
- Parent range: Longford Hills
- OSI/OSNI grid: N187840

Corn Hill, also called Cairn Hill or Carn Clonhugh (Irish: Carn Clainne Aodha or Sliabh Cairbre), is a hill in County Longford, Ireland. It lies north of Longford, between Drumlish and Ballinalee, in the parish of Killoe. At 278 metres above sea level, it is the highest hill in the county and has a television mast (Cairn Hill transmission site) on the top which rises 123 metres above the peak of the hill.

== Etymology ==
The name Carn Clonhugh is an anglicization of the Irish Carn Clainne Aodha, meaning "cairn of Clann Aodha" (anglicised "Clanhugh"). Clanhugh was a historic territory in the northwest of County Longford. The earliest cartographic reference to the hill is found in the 1837–1842 Ordnance Survey Ireland 6 Inch map, which can be seen on the Ordnance Survey Ireland website. In cartography, the hill was referred to as Carn Clonhugh, but by the time of the 2nd edition 1887–1913 Ordnance Survey Ireland 25 Inch map, that was replaced with Corn (a corruption of Cairn) Hill. Today, it is known locally as Corn Hill.

=== Sliabh Carbry ===
Historic literature names this hill Sliabh Carbry after the pre-Norman kingdom of Cairpre Gabra. That a more ancient name of Sliabh Uillinn applied is supported by the Irish Annals. An old manuscript calls Sliabh Carbry the mountains of Uillim red-edged, the son of Fionn.

== Geology ==
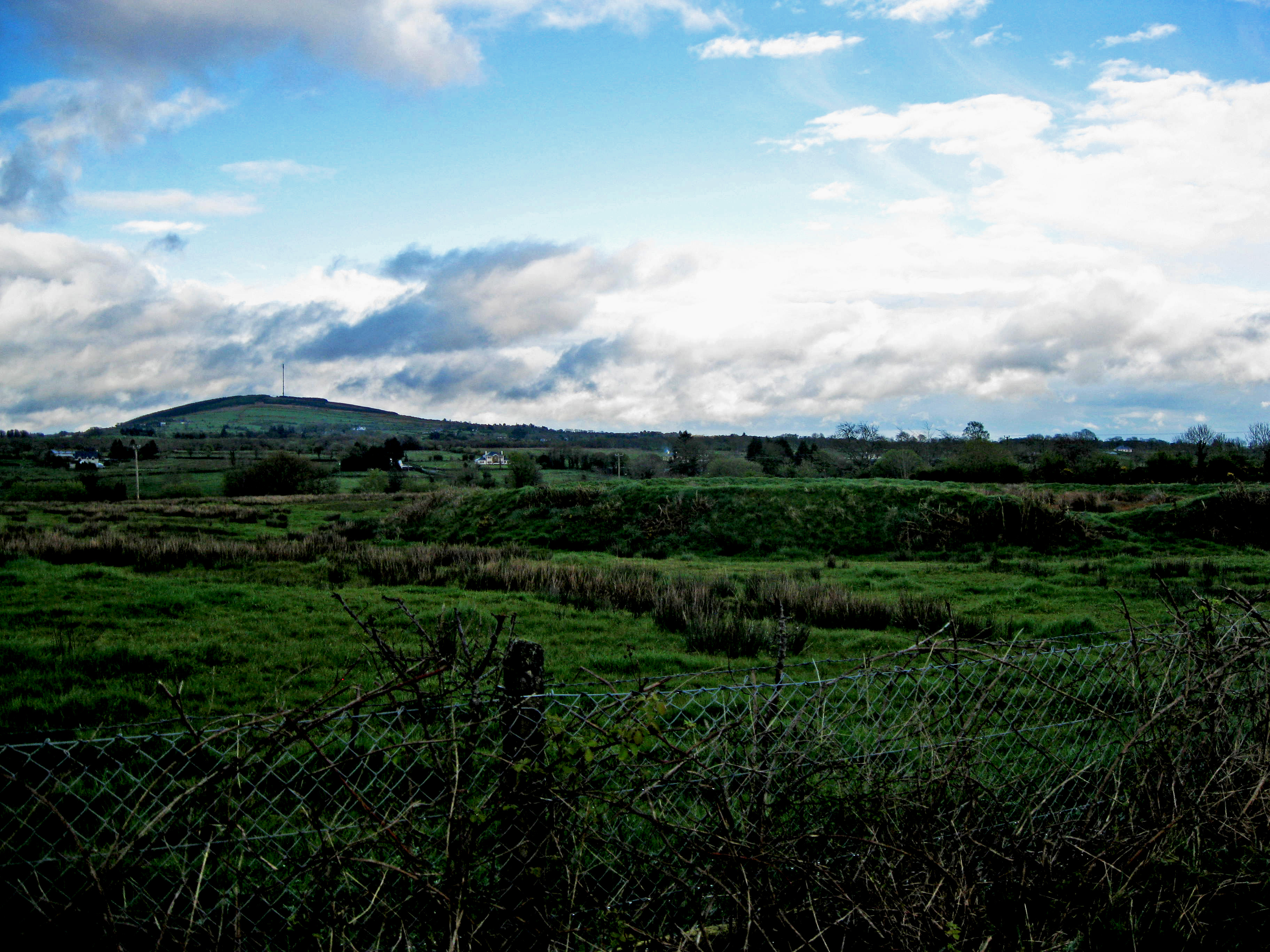
Cairn Hill can be seen in the distance, with a ringfort in the foreground

Cairn Hill is located in area of north Longford dominated by Middle to Upper Ordovician slate, sandstone, conglomerate, and greywacke according to the Geological Survey of Ireland public data viewer.

== Panorama ==
The hill has extensive views of the landscape below. The forested land obstructs most of the view from Cairn A, but Cairn B has an extensive panorama from WSW to SSE. Sliabh Ban can clearly be seen from Cairn B along with the peat power-station of Lanesborough–Ballyleague and Ardagh Hill.

== Archaeology ==
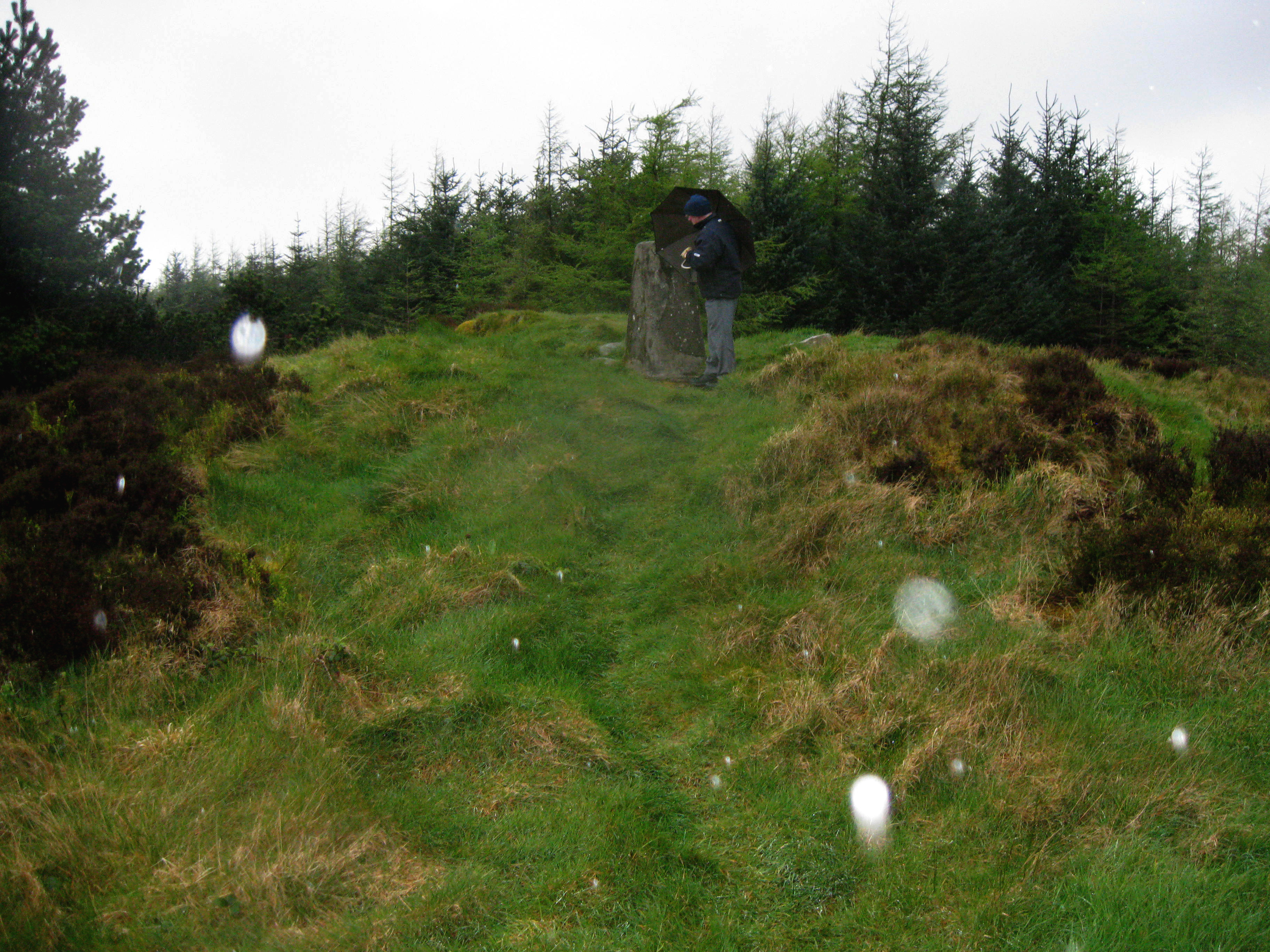
Cairn A or Carn Caille

Passage graves usually cluster in two or more cairns, consisting of mainly a passage leading to a central chamber, corbelled roofed chamber sometimes in the form of a cruciform shape. The perimeter of the cairn would be edged by kerbstones, like those of Newgrange, County Meath and Carrowmore, County Sligo. Passage tombs are usually found in prominent locations, such as hill-tops. Generally speaking, the less complex the passage tomb is the older it is considered to be. The possible passage tombs atop Cairn hill are considered to be among the oldest in Ireland along with Carrowmore, County Sligo.

The hill is particularly important for the two possible passage grave structures atop it. The largest example is Cairn A (or Carn Caille), marking the highest physical point of the hill with a diameter of 18 m and height of 3 m. Reference to that cairn does not appear until 1960, when Ordnance Survey Ireland installed a trigonometrical station, partially damaging the cairn. An excavation took place before installation, with cremated bone recovered from a central rectangular chamber. Thanks to the advent of Global Positioning System technology, the trigonometrical station is now redundant. The second cairn, Cairn B, is about 50 m to the north of Cairn A, with a 9 m diameter and difficult to identify due to the extensive coverage of peat and heather.

== Folklore ==
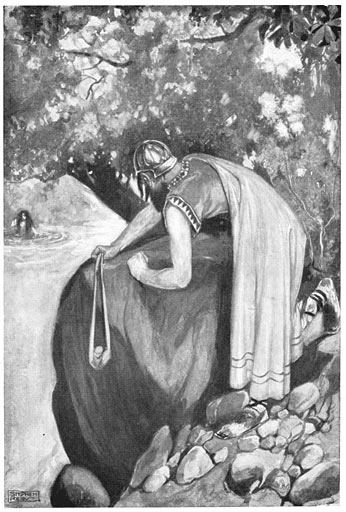
Furbaide Ferbend

Cairn A (or Carn Caille) has two legends associated with it. The first refers to the location of the burial place of Queen Maeve's nephew and murderer, Furbaide Ferbend on the summit of Sliabh Uillen (Cairn Hill). One of the cairn on Sliabh Carbry (in Cairpre Gabra) was indeed anciently called "Carn Furbaidhe". The second legend refers to Cairn A (or Carn Caille)and its creation by the Cailleach a Bheara or ancient Hag/Witch who dropped stones out of her apron as she flew over the hill. This legend is also associated with many Passage grave sites throughout the island of Ireland, such as Carrowmore, County Sligo and Carrowkeel, County Sligo.

== See also ==
- Lists of mountains in Ireland
- List of Irish counties by highest point
- List of mountains of the British Isles by height
- List of Marilyns in the British Isles

== Pictures ==
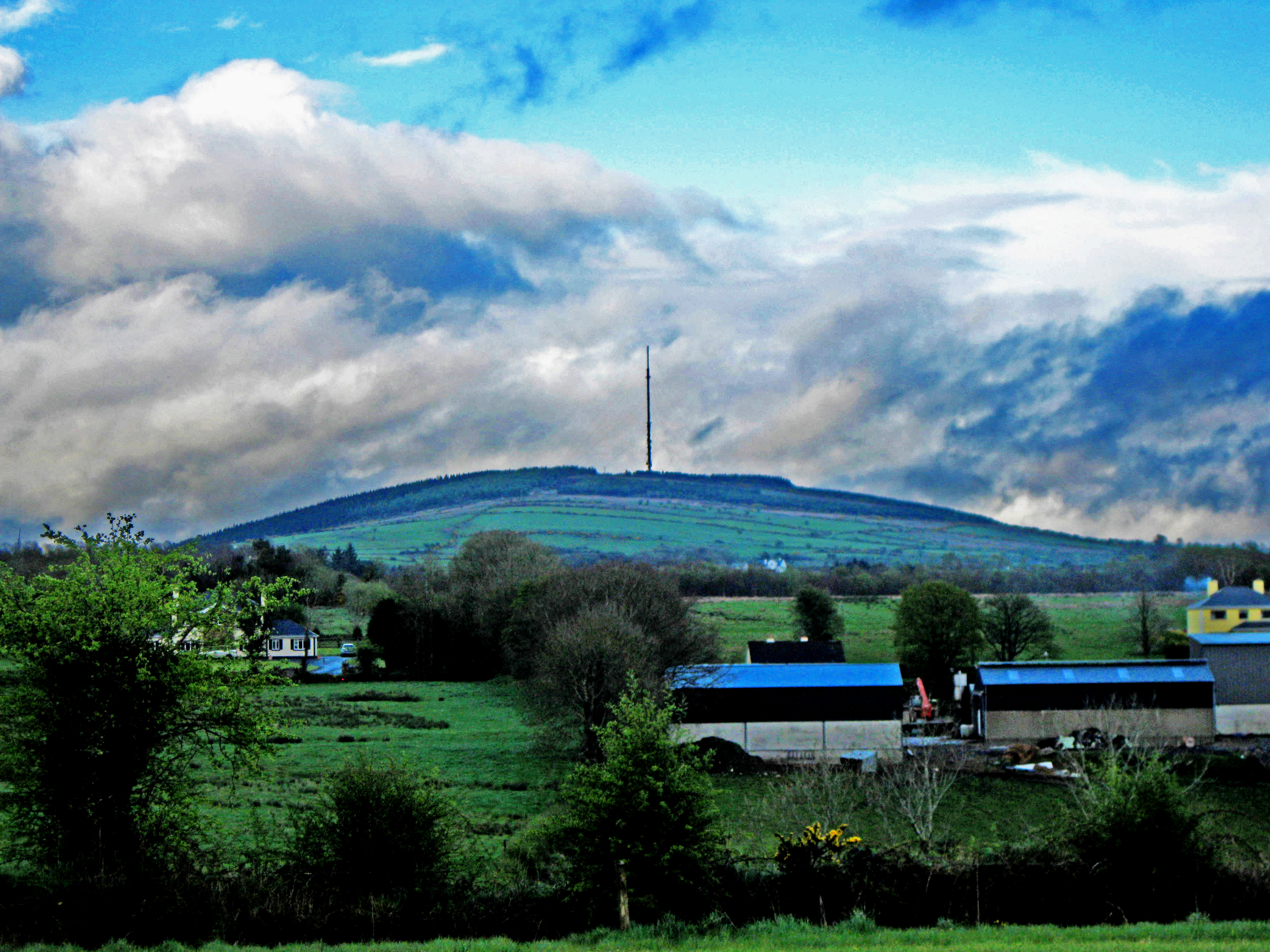

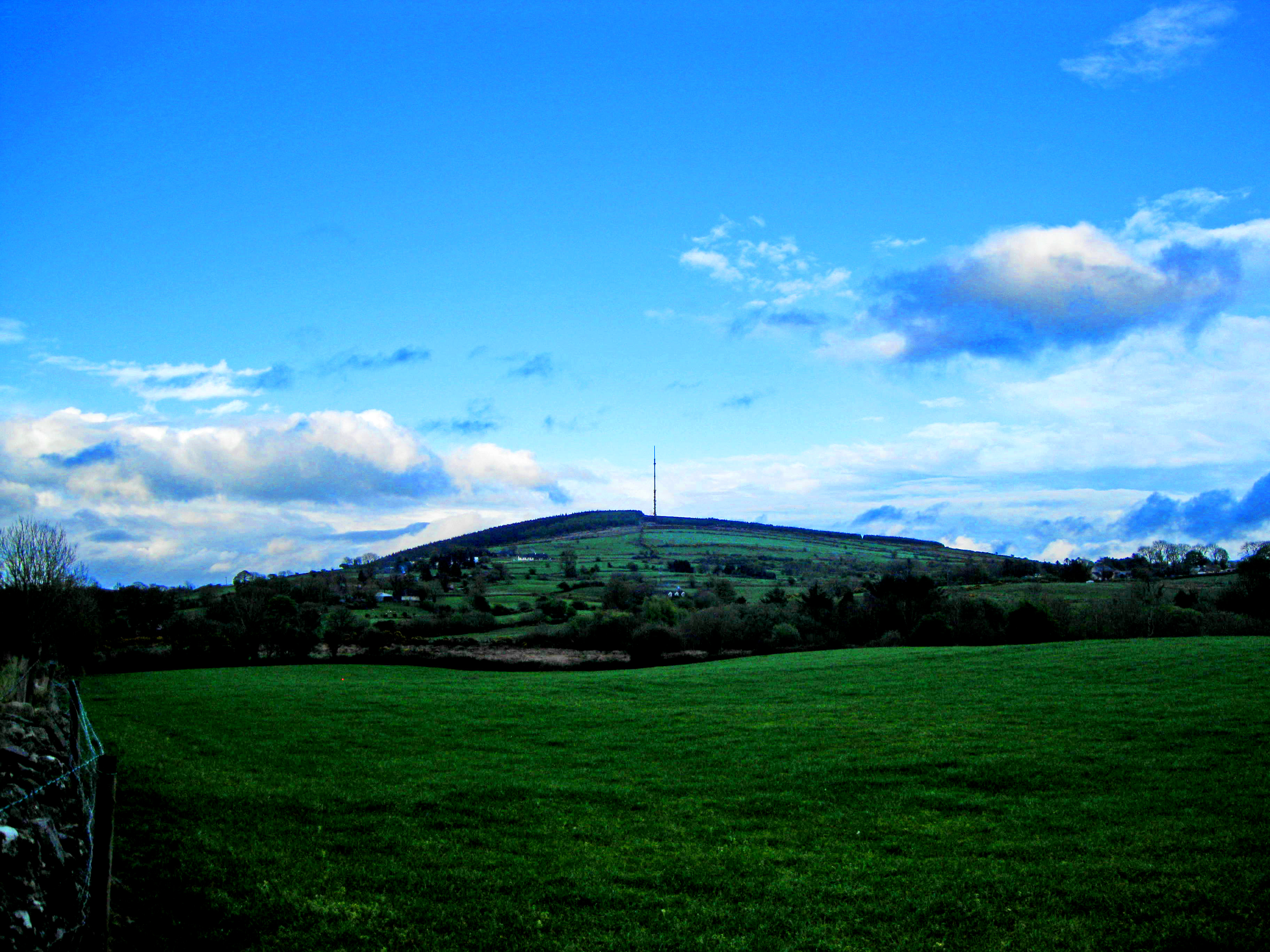

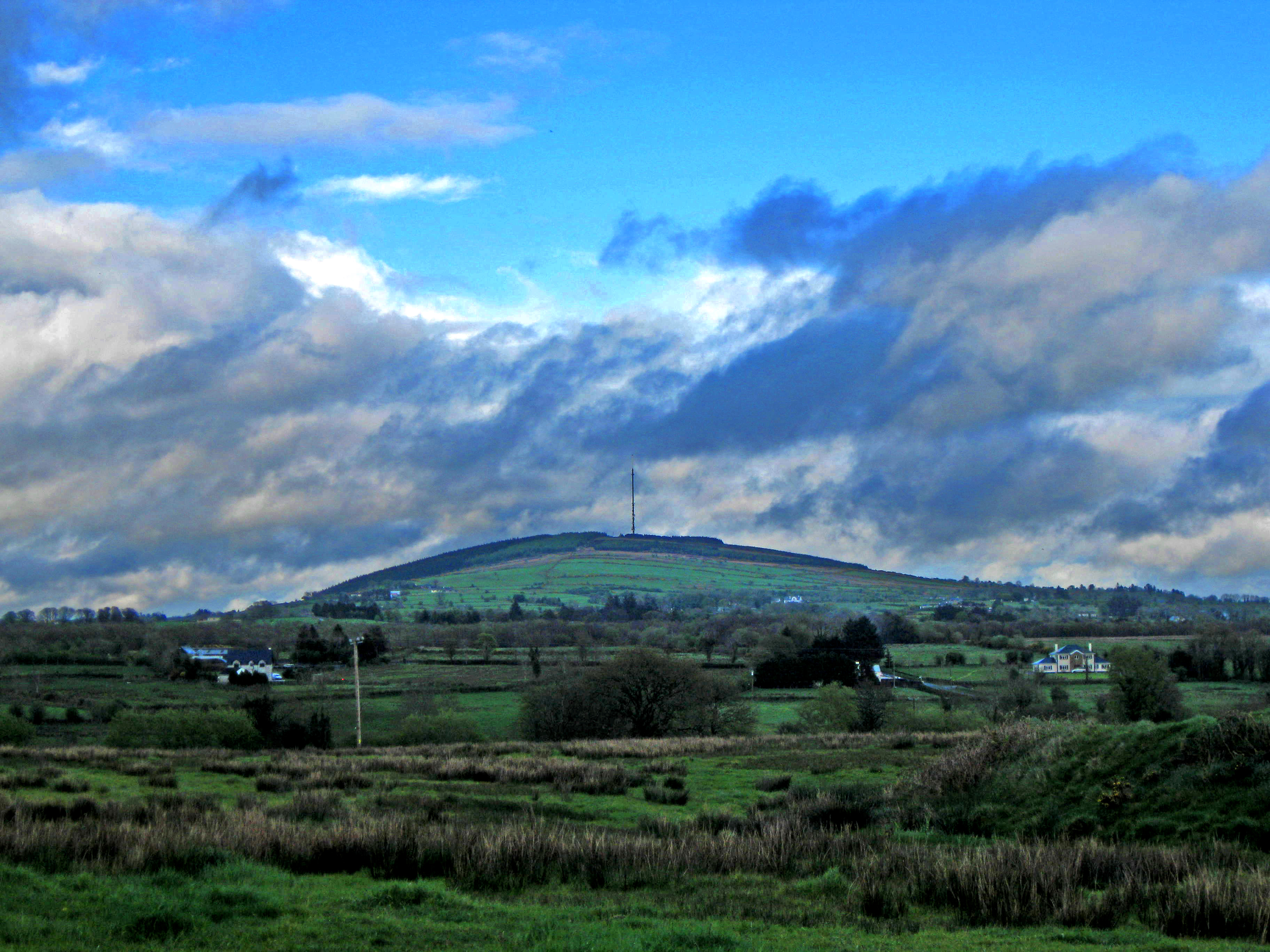

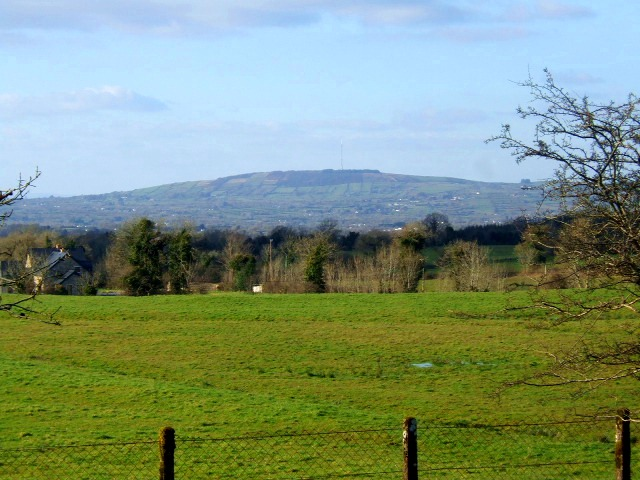

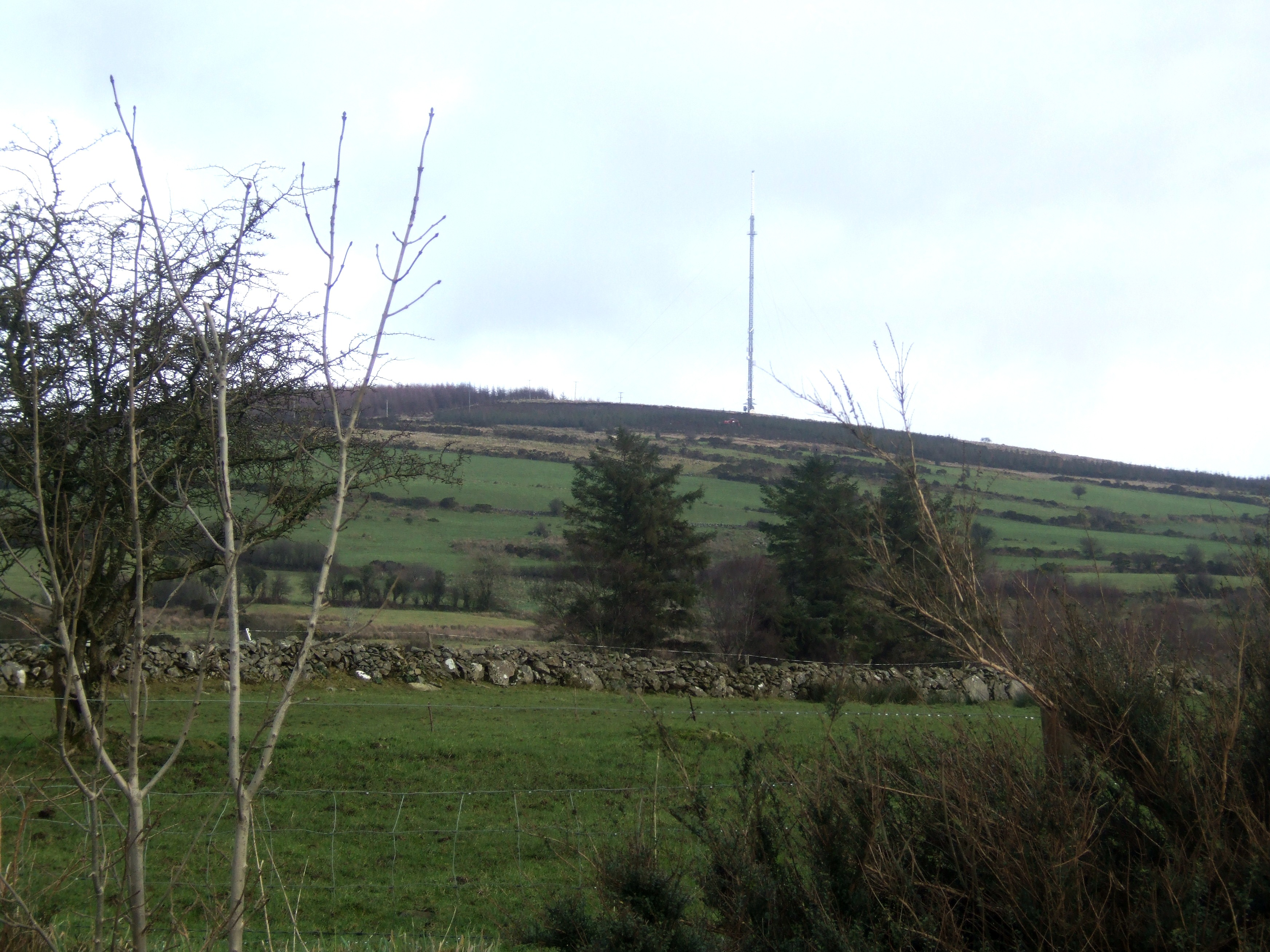

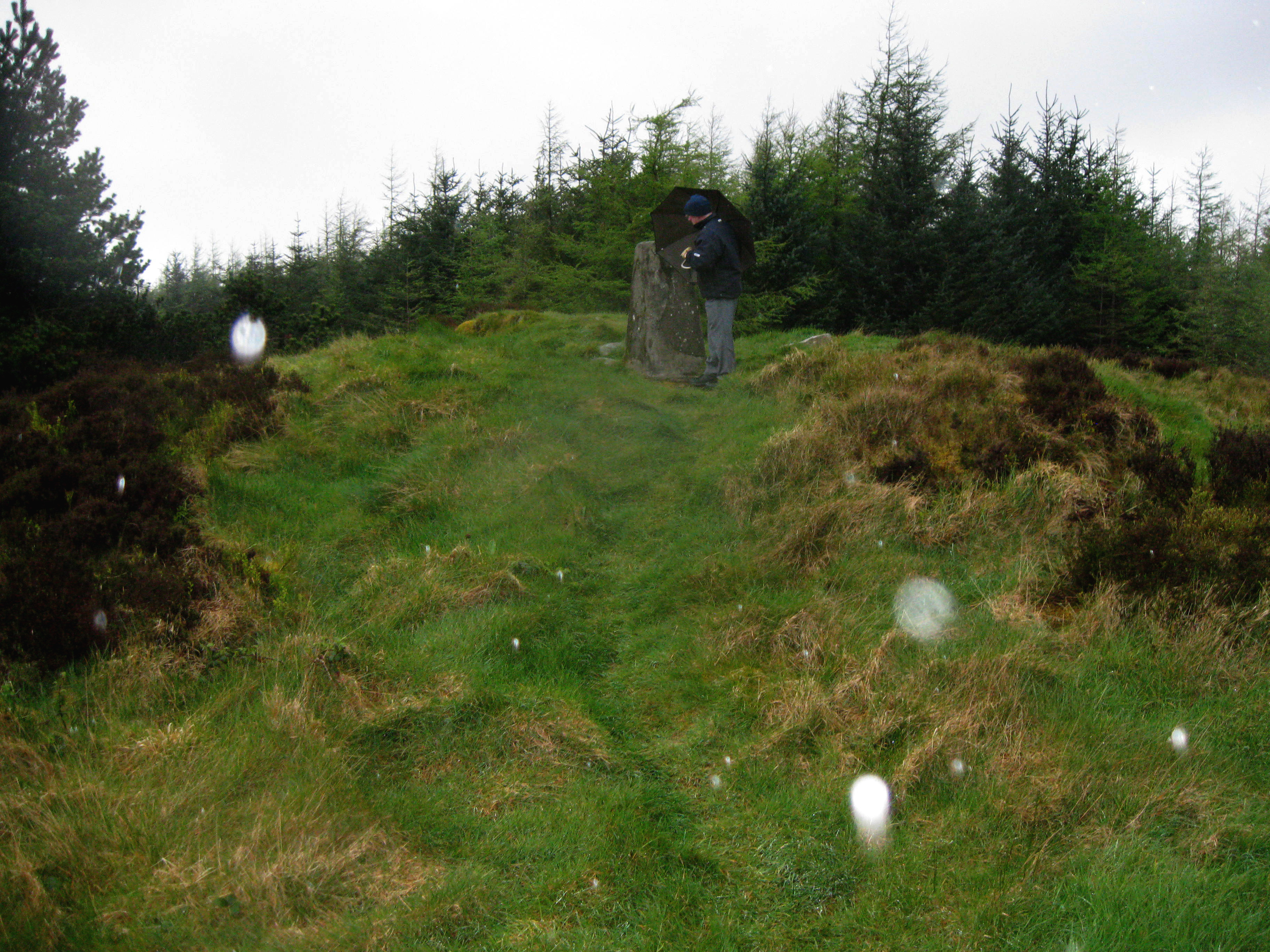

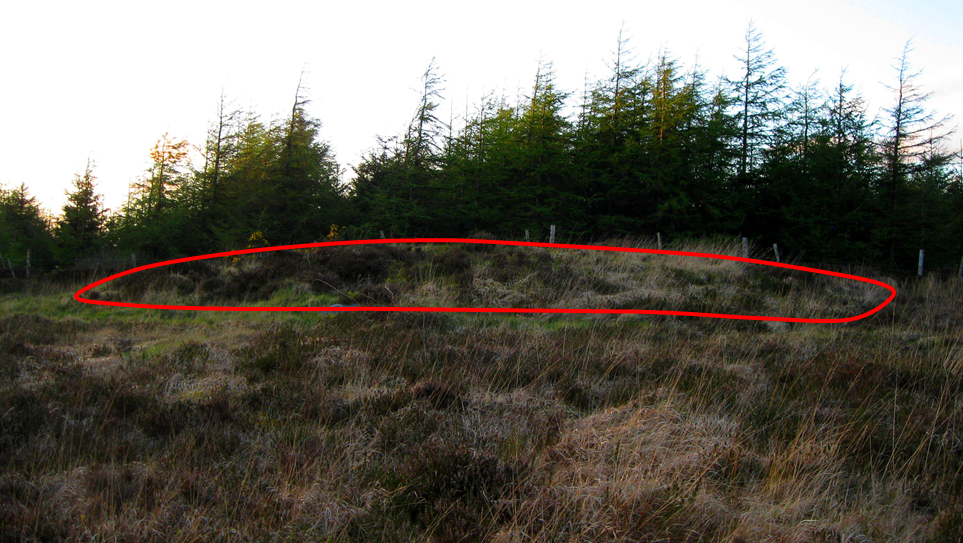
