= Shrule (barony) =

Shrule Sruthail (Irish)
- Barony
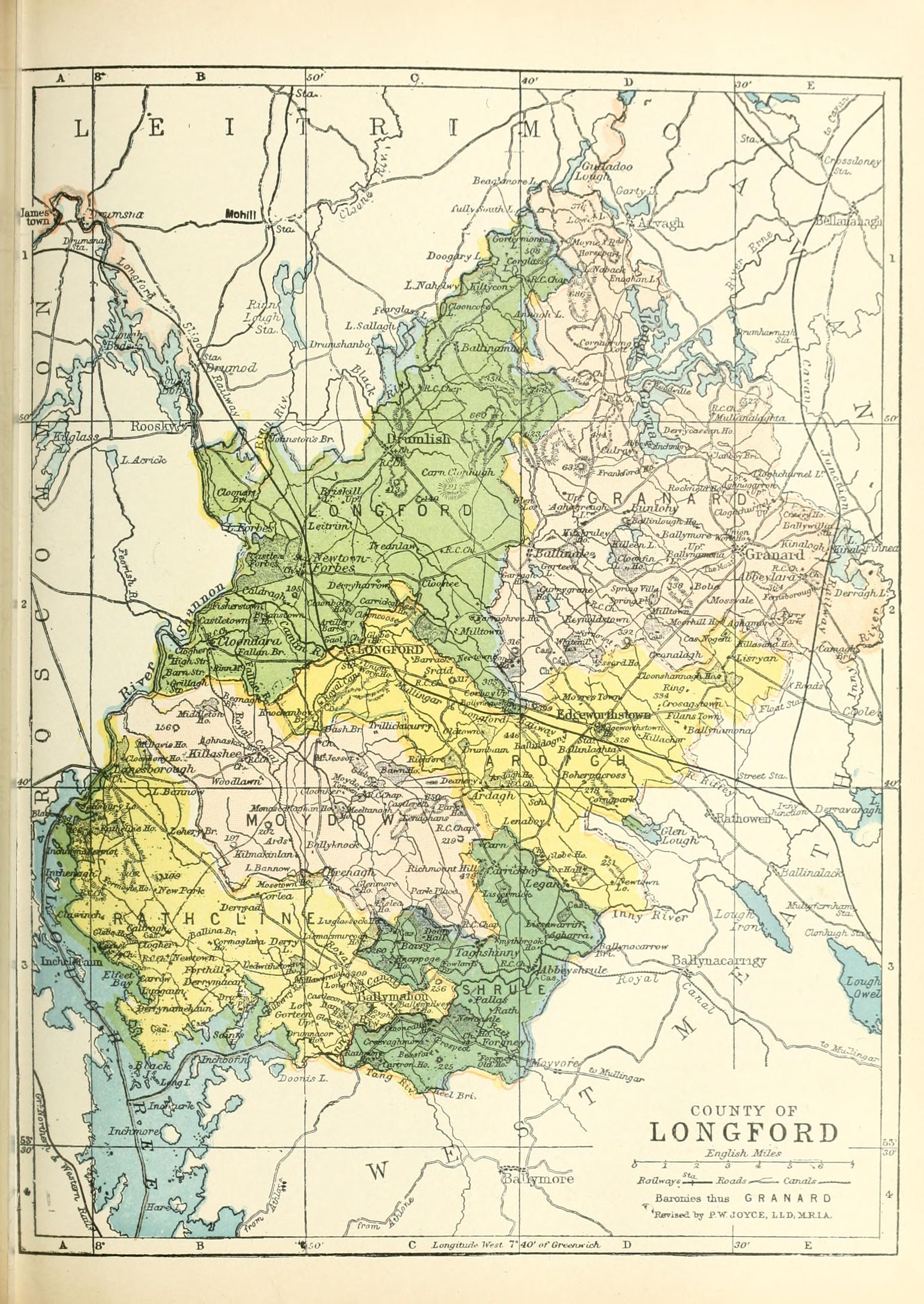
- Baronies of County Longford. Shrule is shaded forest green.
- Sovereign state: Ireland
- County: Longford

Area
  - Total: 85 km^{2} (33 sq mi)

Shrule (Irish: Sruthail), sometimes called Abbeyshrule, is a barony in County Longford, Ireland.

== Etymology ==
Shrule takes its name from Abbeyshrule (Irish Mainistir Shruthla, "abbey by the stream").

== Location ==
Shrule is located in southeast County Longford, on the lower reaches of the River Inny.

== History ==
Shrule barony was formed from was formed from parts of the territories of Moybrawne (Shrule), Clanconnor and Muintergalgan. Moybrawne was anciently part of a territory known as Bregmaine, or Mag Bregmaine, in Cenél Maine.

== List of settlements ==
Below is a list of settlements in Shrule:

- Abbeyshrule
- Forgney
- Taghshinny
