= Cairpre Gabra =

Irish barony (5th to 12th centuries)

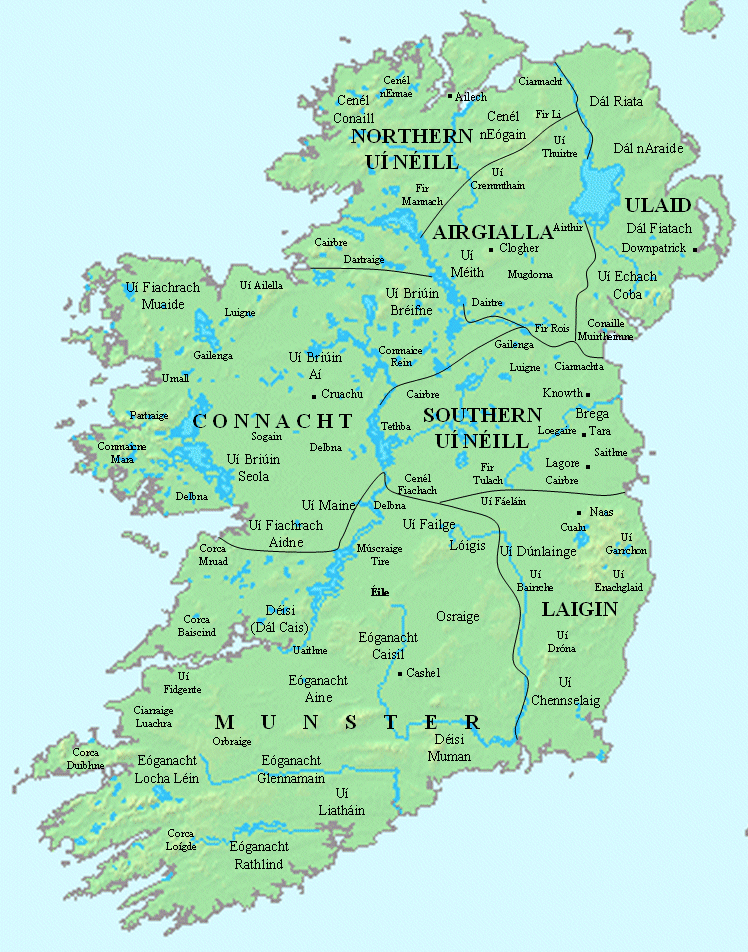
Early peoples and kingdoms of Ireland, c.800

Between the 5th and 12th centuries, an Irish sept claiming descent from Coirpre mac Néill ruled a barony of north Tethbae, (Note: Tethbae (Latin: Teffia) originally referred to an area north of the River Inny approximating to present day County Longford. County Longford was sometimes called Upper Conmaicne, to distinguish it from south Leitrim, then called Lower Conmaicne, because both districts were ruled by the descendants of Conmac, son of Fergus and Queen Meadbh of Connacht.) called Cairpre Gabra. Their territory corresponds to the barony of Granard in modern county Longford in Ireland.

== Etymology ==
Cairpre Gabra is a corruption of Irish: Cairbre Ua gCiardha and is best translated as "the descendants of Coirpre". Coirpre mac Néill (Modern Irish: Cairbre) was eldest son of the Niall of the Nine Hostages the supposed ancestor of the southern Uí Néill. Tradition claims Coirpre married a Fir Bolg princess named Mulreany and ruled all of North Longford from the Moat of Granard. Coirpre also owned tracts near Lough Erne and the Carbury barony in Sligo. The first Uí Néill successes in Leinster were probably due to this Coirpre, supposedly a high king of Ireland.

Ó Duígeannáin stated Cairbre Gabhra is identical to the ancient place "Ciarbre Ua gCiardha" disagreeing with O'Donovan's identification as "Carbury (County Kildare barony)". (Note: Ó Duígeannáin wrote "OG. following O'Donovan wrongly locates Cairbre Ua gCiardha in the barony of Carbury, Co. Kildare. Actually it was identical with Cairpre Gabra".)

== Tuath Glasraige & Brecraighi ==
The territory was presumably a frontier colony of the Kingdom of Meath before the seventh century. An ancient folklore called "the Revolt of the Aithech Tuatha" named "the Tuath Glasraige” as ruling the territory around Granard and Lough Sheelin ("Irish: Tuath Glasraighe im Chairbre [Gabhra] agus im Loch Silinn") but nothing further is known about the tribe. Bracan mac Máine Mór probably resided at Rathbracken townland to the north of Granard. His descendants, the "Tuath Brecraighi", were defeated by the Cenél Coirpri in AD 751.

== Cairpre Gabra ==
Between the fifth and seventh centuries, a branch of the Uí Néill called the Cairpre Gabhra (Irish: Cairbré Ua Ciarrdha - descendants of Coirpre mac Néill) settled around Granard and Lough Sheelin in North Tethbae (approximately county Longford). Three distinct sub-septs of the Cenel Coirpri listed in the genealogies were powerful circa 700AD, namely the "Cairpri Laigin", the "Cairpri Gabra", and "Cairpri Dromma Cliab" though current thinking now believes "Cairpri Laigin" was a later construct. Furthermore, various related septs under the designations of Cenel Cairpre, Cairpre Mor, and Cairpre Gabra, figure in the annals of Ulster from the seventh, eighth, and ninth century. Cairpre Gabra is first mentioned in the Irish Annals for the year AD731. It is generally believed a larger Cairpre grouping stretched from Sligo to Longford at an early date taking in Leitrim and parts of Fermanagh (Tuatha Ratha or Magheraboy) and it was divided in two by the expansion of the Kingdom of Breifne under the Uí Briúin.

Cairpre Gabra lay between the tuaths of Luigne-Gailenga to the east, (Note: Mac Fhirbhisigh described a branch of the Gailenga as the "Gaileanga of North Teathfa".) and Conmaicne Maigh Rein to the north-west. Centred on Granard, Cairpre Gabra lay along the northern border of the ancient Kingdom of Meath, and comprised the barony of Granard, and at least part of the barony of Longford. Cairbre may have extended as far east as Cúl (Coole) in county Westmeath). The north-western frontier ran from Cluain Cusa (Clooncoose) through Crott (between Slieve Carbry and Lake Naback) over as far as Lough Gowna, but excluded the most northern portion of the modern barony of Granard. The Cairpre territory was probably of limited extent by the 8th century.

The principal churches were at Granard and Clonbroney, supposedly given to Saint Patrick when he visited "Coirpre" and instructed Guasacht mac Milchu to found a church at Granard, and two sisters, Emers, to found a church at Cluain Brónaigh (ClonBroney). Cairbre Gabra was therefore among the first Christianity centres in Ireland.

Cairpre Gabra was not a strong tuath and in the 11th century the O'Cairbres were conquered by the Ó Cuinns, Ó Fearghails, and other Conmhaicne tribes. Caipre Gabra was absorbed into the larger Annaly kingdom, so named after "Anghaile" the great-grandfather of Fearghail O'Farrell. Annaly became Longphoirt, now Longford, after O'Farrell's fortress of this name.

It is believed a section of the dynasty were introduced as lords of Carbury in Kildare in a 12th-century intrusion following this pressure on their original territory in north-east Longford. Ó Ciardha (O'Keary or O'Carey) were established as lords of Carbury from this group about the time of the Norman invasion of Ireland.

== Events ==
Dobbs (1938, 1941) summarizes many events connected to the ancient Granard (barony) and Cairbre Gabra as follows-

- A Prehistoric Battle of Cluain Cuas (Clooncose) was won by Tigernmas.
- AD 236 Cormac mac Airt defeated the Ulstermen at Granard.
- AD 581 Aed mac Brenann mac Briun mac Máine Mór, king of Tethba, helped Saint Columcille and the northern Uí Neill decisively defeat the Meath Uí Neill at the battle of Cúl Uinnsin, at the south end of Lough Gowna in Coirpre Gabra. The Geas on the Kings of Tara "not to go into the dark country of North Tethba on a Tuesday" might originate from this defeat.
- AD 751 The "Uí Lachtnain" descendants of Eogan mac Bracan mac Máine Mór and "kings of the Brecraighi" were annihilated by the Cenél Coirpri at "Kilfintan" (5 km south of Granard).
- AD 927 Ua Ruairc raided Cairbre and Taebata killing Ua Ciarrdha, the lord of Cairbre Gabhra.
- AD 983 Brian Boru raided the western Kingdom of Meath and likely attacked Cairbre Gabra.
- AD 992 Maelruanaidh Ua Ciardha, king of Cairbre, was killed by the men of Tethba.
- AD 1012 Cairbre Gabhra were involved in a raid on the Gailenga in Cavan and the Kingdom of Meath. Pursued home, Ualgharg Ua Ciardha, lord of Cairbre, and many others were killed.
- AD 1046 Ua Ciardha, lord of Cairbre Gabhra, was killed by the lord of Tethba (Ua Flannagain of Comar).
- AD 1066 Many of the Cairbre Gabhra were slaughtered probably in revenge for plundering Scrin Choluimchille (Skreen in County Meath).
- AD 1069 Cairpre Gabhra and the church of Granard were burnt by the lord of Fine-gall, possibly in revenge for the burnings of Lusk and Swords churches the previous year.
- AD 1070 The men of Tethba were defeated by Ua Ruairc of Breifne.
- AD 1184 Cairpre Gabra disappear as an individual principality following the Norman invasion.

== See also ==
- Tethbae
- Granard (barony)
- Gailenga
- Annaly

== References and notes ==
=== Primary references ===
- Ó Duígeannáin, Mícheál (1935). "Notes on the History of the Kingdom of Bréifne". The Journal of the Royal Society of Antiquaries of Ireland. 5 (1). Royal Society of Antiquaries of Ireland: 113–140. JSTOR 25513764.
- Dobbs, Margaret E. (1938). "The Territory and People of Tethba". The Journal of the Royal Society of Antiquaries of Ireland. Seventh Series, Vol. 8, No. 2 (2). Royal Society of Antiquaries of Ireland: 241–259. JSTOR 25510138.

=== Secondary references ===
- Byrne, Francis John (2001). Irish kings and High Kings (2nd ed.). Dublin: Four Courts. ISBN 9781851825523.
- Ulwencreutz, Lars (2013). Ulwencreutz's The Royal Families in Europe V. Ulwencreutz Media. ISBN 978-1304581358.
- MacGivney, Joseph (1908). Place-names of County Longford : collected from various sources. Dublin : J. Duffy.
- MacCotter, Paul (2008). Medieval Ireland: territorial, political and economic divisions (illustrated ed.). Four Courts Press. ISBN 9781846820984.
- Mahon, William (1988). Glasraige, Tóecraige, and Araid: Evidence from Ogam. Vol. Proceedings of the Harvard Celtic Colloquium, Volumes 8-9. Department of Celtic Languages and Literatures, Faculty of Arts and Sciences, Harvard University. ISBN 978-1-879095-00-7.
- Catholic Record Society of Ireland (1912). Archivium hibernicum: or, Irish historical records, Volume 1 (Original from Cornell University, digitised 2012 ed.). Record Society, St. Patrick's College.
- O Croinin, Daibhi (1976). Theodore William Moody; Francis X. Martin; Francis John Byrne; Art Cosgrove (eds.). A New History of Ireland: Prehistoric and early Ireland. Vol. 1 of A New History of Ireland, Theodore William Moody, Volume 1 of A New History of Ireland: Prehistoric and Early Ireland, Ed. by Daibhi O Croinin, W. E. Vaughan (illustrated, reprint ed.). Oxford University Press. ISBN 0198217374.
- Charles-Edwards, T. M. (2000). Early Christian Ireland (illustrated, reprint ed.). Cambridge University Press. ISBN 0521363950.
- Dobbs, Margaret E. (1941). "The Territory and People of Tethba (Continued)". The Journal of the Royal Society of Antiquaries of Ireland. Seventh Series, Vol. 11, No. 3 (3). Royal Society of Antiquaries of Ireland: 101–110. JSTOR 25510301.
