= County Longford =

County in Ireland

Coordinates: 53°40′N 7°45′W

County Longford Contae an Longfoirt
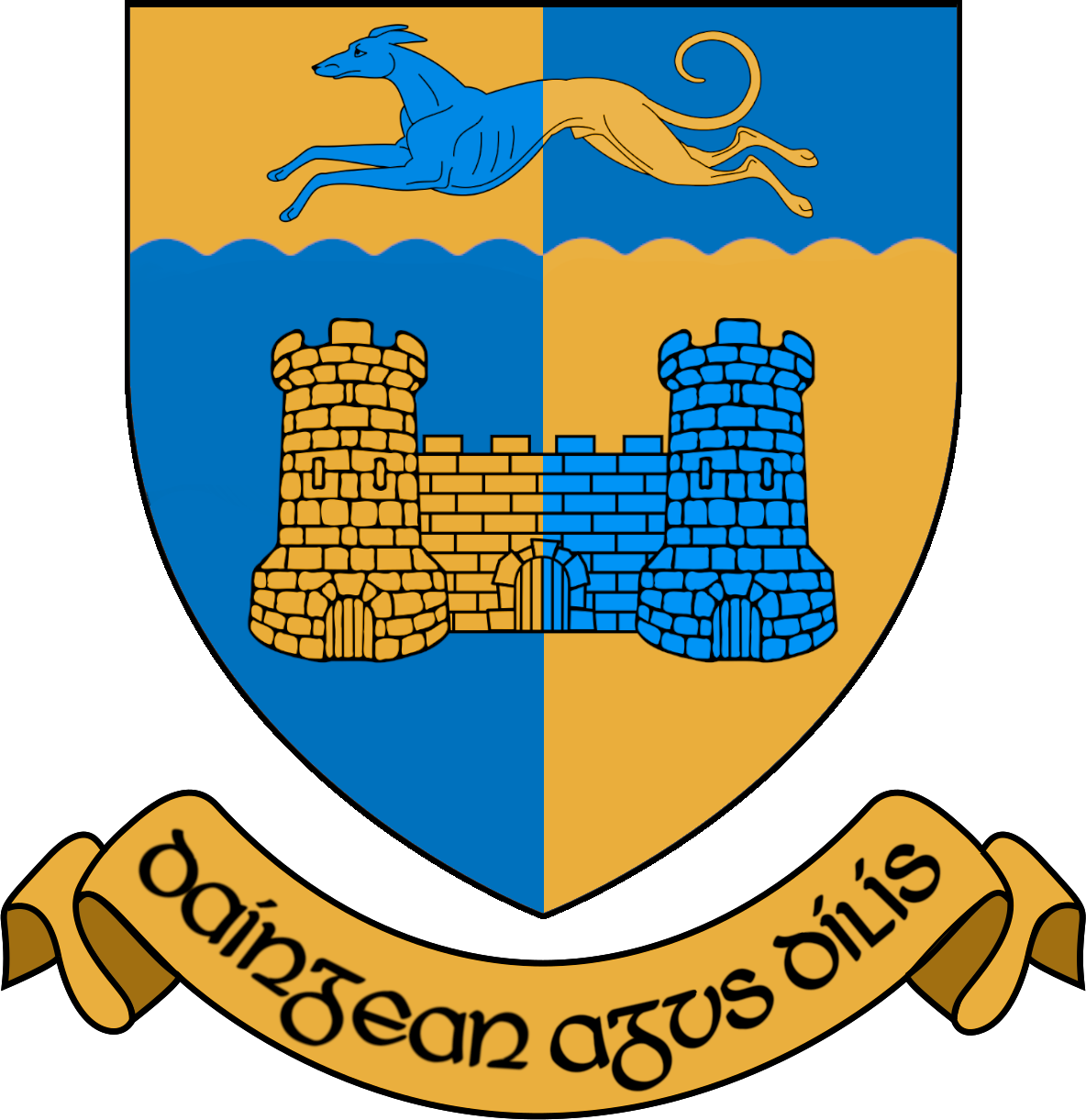
- Coat of arms
- Motto: Daingean agus Dílis (Irish) "Strong and Loyal"
- Interactive map of County Longford
- Country: Ireland
- Province: Leinster
- Region: Eastern and Midland
- Established: 1570
- County town: Longford

Government
  - Local authority: Longford County Council
  - Dáil constituency: Longford–Westmeath
  - EP constituency: Midlands–North-West

Area
  - Total: 1,091 km^{2} (421 sq mi)
  - Rank: 29th
- Highest elevation (Carn Clonhugh): 278 m (912 ft)

Population (2022)
  - Total: 46,751
  - Rank: 31st
  - Density: 42.85/km^{2} (111.0/sq mi)
- Time zone: UTC±0 (WET)
  - Summer (DST): UTC+1 (IST)
- Eircode routing keys: N39 (primarily)
- Telephone area codes: 043 (primarily)
- ISO 3166 code: IE-LD
- Vehicle index mark code: LD
- Website: Official website

County Longford (Irish: Contae an Longfoirt) is a county in Ireland. It is in the province of Leinster. It is named after the town of Longford. Longford County Council is the local authority for the county. The population of the county was 46,634 at the 2022 census. The county is based on the historic Gaelic territory of Annaly (Anghaile), formerly known as Teffia (Teathbha).

== Geography ==
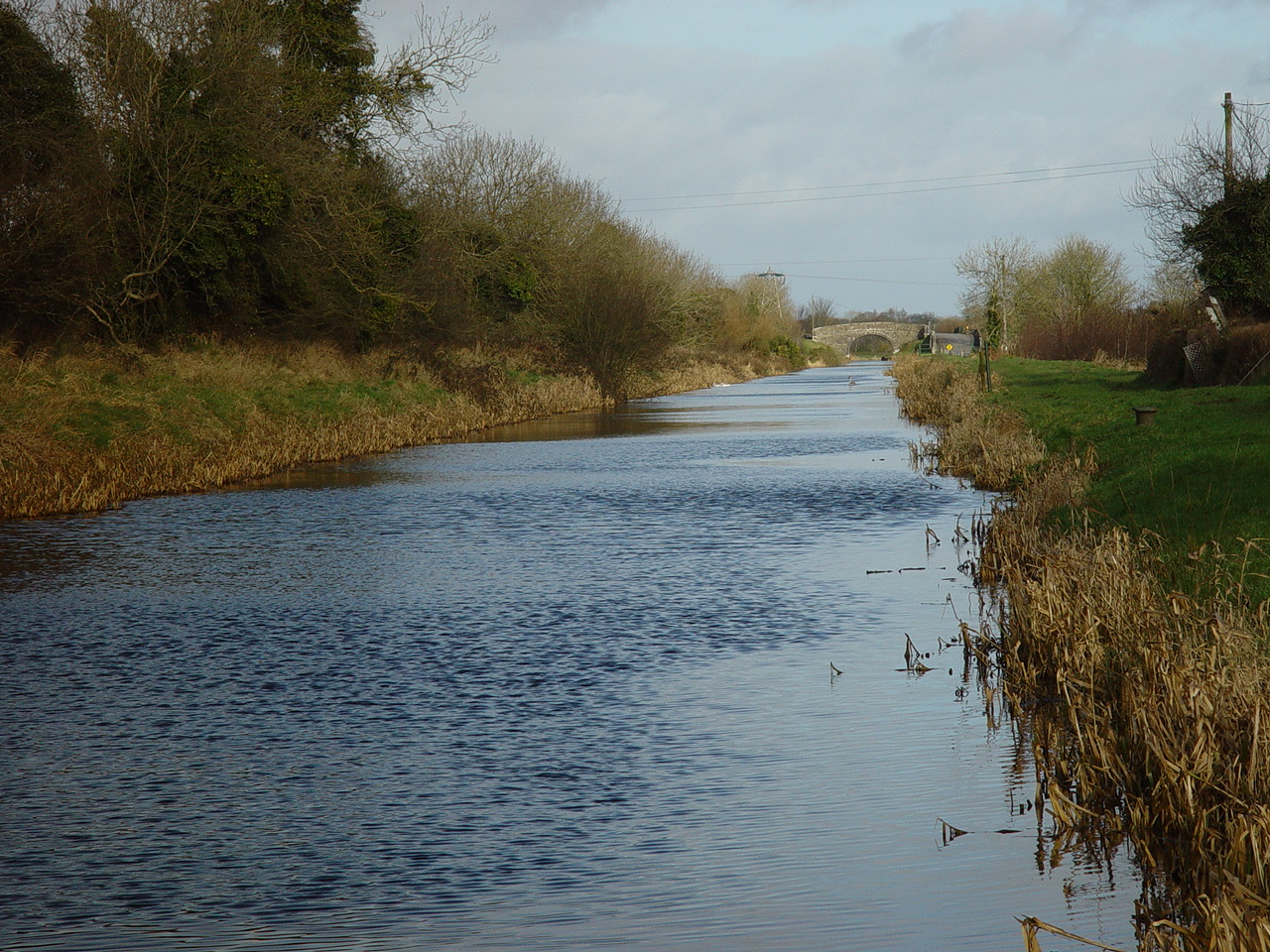
Royal Canal at Keenagh

Most of Longford lies in the basin of the River Shannon with Lough Ree forming much of the county's western boundary. The north-eastern part of the county, however, drains towards the River Erne and Lough Gowna. Lakeland, bogland, pasture-land and wetland typify Longford's generally low-lying landscapes: the highest point of the county is in the north-west – Carn Clonhugh (also known as Cairn Hill or Corn Hill) between Drumlish and Ballinalee in the parish of Killoe, at 278 metres (912 ft). Cairn Hill is the site of a television transmitter broadcasting to much of the Irish midlands.

In the list of Irish counties by highest point, Longford ranks third lowest – only Meath and Westmeath have lower maxima. In general, the northern third of the county is hilly, forming part of the drumlin belt and Esker Riada stretching across the northern midlands of Ireland. The southern parts of the county are low-lying, with extensive areas of raised bogland and the land being of better quality for grazing and tillage. The River Shannon marks the county's border with Roscommon while the Rivers Inny and Tang form much of the boundary with Westmeath.

The Royal Canal flows through the south of the county, terminating at Cloondara at the Shannon. The canal was refurbished and reopened in 2010, 39 years after its closure by the CIÉ. Notable lakes include Lough Kinale and Lough Gowna on the County Cavan border, Lough Forbes on the County Roscommon border and Lough Ree in the south where counties Longford, Westmeath and Roscommon meet.

=== Subdivisions ===
There are six historical baronies:

- Ardagh
- Granard
- Longford
- Moydow
- Rathcline
- Shrule or Abbeyshrule

=== Largest towns ===
1. Longford 10,952
2. Edgeworthstown 2,199
3. Lanesborough* 1,733 (includes Ballyleague, County Roscommon)
4. Ballymahon 1,714
5. Drumlish 1,124
6. Granard 1,058
7. Newtownforbes 851
8. Keenagh 753
9. Ballinalee 395
10. Legan 346

==== Towns and villages ====
- Abbeylara
- Abbeyshrule
- Ardagh
- Aughnacliffe
- Ballinamuck
- Ballymahon
- Ballinalee
- Cloondara
- Colehill
- Drumlish
- Edgeworthstown
- Granard
- Kenagh
- Killashee
- Killoe
- Lanesborough
- Legan
- Lisryan
- Longford
- Moydow
- Mullinalaghta
- Newtowncashel
- Newtownforbes
- Taghshinny

Townlands are the smallest officially defined geographical divisions in Ireland, with 944 townlands in the county.

== Governance and politics ==
The island of Ireland, showing location of County Longford.

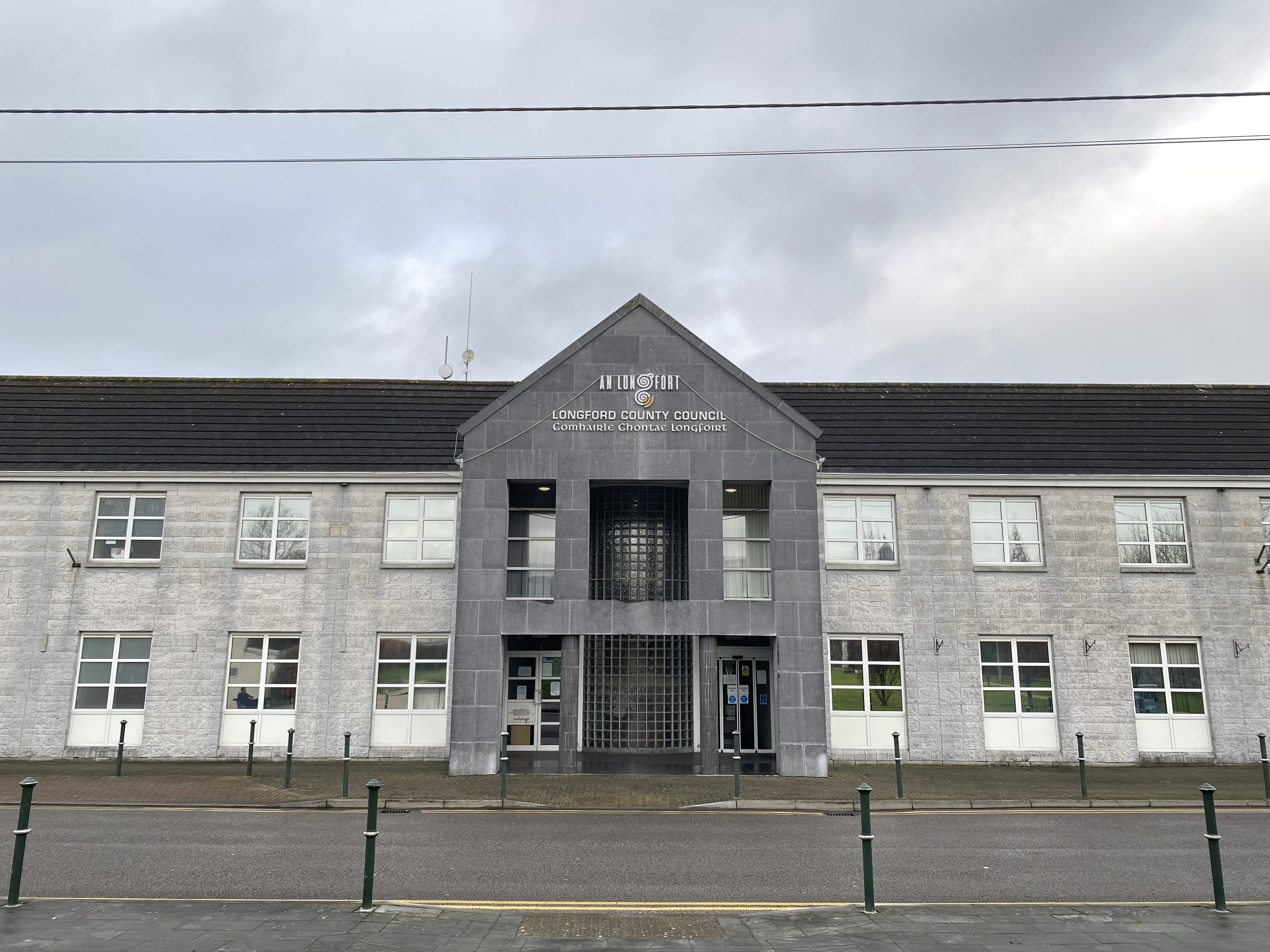
Longford County Hall

The county is part of the Dáil constituency of Longford–Westmeath.

== History ==
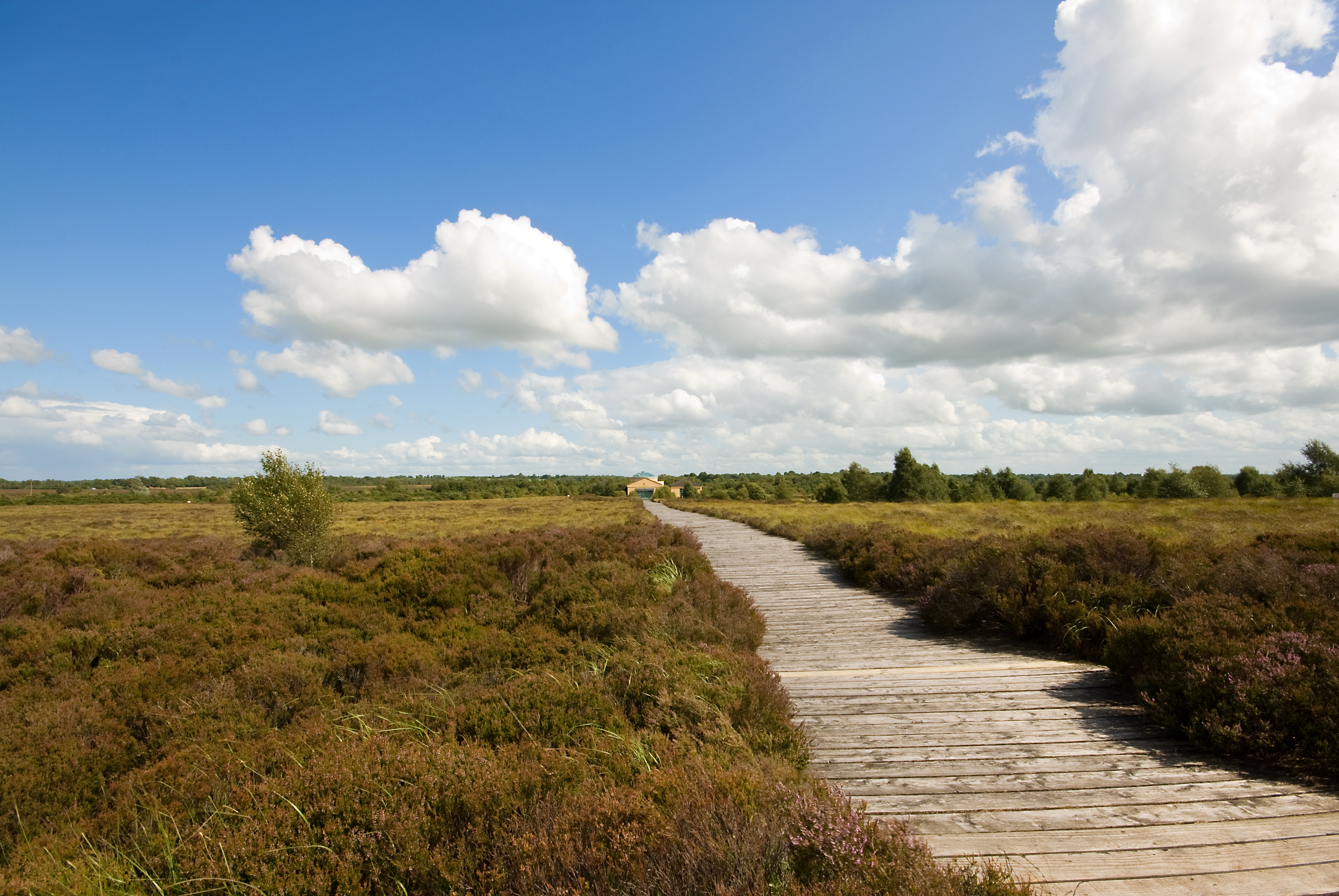
Corlea Trackway

The territory corresponding to County Longford was presumably a frontier colony of the Kingdom of Meath in the first millennium. Between the fifth and twelfth centuries, the territory was called the kingdom of Tethbae ruled by various tuath such as the Cairpre Gabra in the north. Tethbae (Latin: Teffia) originally referred to an area north of the River Inny approximating to present-day County Longford.

In the year AD 1070, Tethbae was conquered by the Ó Cuinns, Ó Fearghails and other Conmhaicne tribes, henceforth being known as "Muintir Annaly", so named after "Anghaile" the great-grandfather of Fearghail O'Farrell. Furthermore, County Longford was often called Upper Conmaicne, to distinguish it from south Leitrim, then called Lower Conmaicne, because both districts were ruled by the descendants of Conmac, son of Fergus and Queen Meadbh of Connacht.

Following the Norman invasion of the 12th century, Annaly was granted to Hugh de Lacy as part of the Liberty of Meath. An English settlement was established at Granard, with Norman Cistercian monasteries being established at Abbeylara and Abbeyshrule and Augustinian monasteries at Abbeyderg and at Saints' Island on the shore of Lough Ree. Monastic remains at Ardagh, Abbeylara, Abbeyderg, Abbeyshrule, Inchcleraun Island in Lough Ree and Inchmore Island in Lough Gowna are reminders of the county's long Christian history. However, by the 14th century, English influence in Ireland was on the wane. The town of Granard was sacked by Edward Bruce's army in 1315, and the O'Farrells soon recovered complete control over the territory. Annaly later became Longphoirt, now Longford, after O'Farrell's fortress of this name.

The county was officially shired in 1586 in the reign of Elizabeth I from the northern portion of Westmeath, but English control was not fully established until the aftermath of the Nine Years' War. County Longford was added to Leinster by James I in 1608 (it had previously been considered part of Connacht), with the county being divided into six baronies and its boundaries being officially defined. The county was planted by English and Scottish landowners in 1620, with much of the O'Farrell lands being confiscated and granted to new owners. The change in control was completed during the Cromwellian plantations of the 1650s. On these lands in County Longford, are the historic ruins of the Coolamber Hall House, which was besieged by one of the Cromwells.

The county was a centre of the 1798 rebellion, when the French expeditionary force led by Humbert, which had landed at Killala, was defeated outside the village of Ballinamuck on 8 September by a British army led by Cornwallis. General Humbert had hoped to amalgamate his forces with other rebels located in Granard, but Cornwallis, aware of the danger, had defeated these forces in the second battle of Granard prior to defeating General Humbert in Ballinamuck. Considerable reprisals were inflicted by the British on the civilian inhabitants of the county in the aftermath of the battle.

A revolutionary spirit was again woken in the county during the Irish War of Independence when the North Longford flying column, led by Seán Mac Eoin, became one of the most active units on the Irish side during that war.

== Demographics ==
Historical population
| Year | Pop. | ±% |
|---|---|---|
| 1500 | 3,021 | — |
| 1510 | 2,054 | −32.0% |
| 1550 | 2,307 | +12.3% |
| 1580 | 2,089 | −9.4% |
| 1585 | 2,212 | +5.9% |
| 1600 | 2,054 | −7.1% |
| 1610 | 4,534 | +120.7% |
| 1653 | 5,150 | +13.6% |
| 1659 | 5,392 | +4.7% |
| 1672 | 10,784 | +100.0% |
| 1680 | 21,568 | +100.0% |
| 1690 | 33,136 | +53.6% |
| 1700 | 35,770 | +7.9% |
| 1710 | 33,105 | −7.5% |
| 1725 | 36,272 | +9.6% |
| 1735 | 37,668 | +3.8% |
| 1745 | 42,544 | +12.9% |
| 1755 | 41,335 | −2.8% |
| 1765 | 39,888 | −3.5% |
| 1771 | 38,771 | −2.8% |
| 1775 | 49,557 | +27.8% |
| 1781 | 55,088 | +11.2% |
| 1788 | 70,176 | +27.4% |
| 1790 | 75,352 | +7.4% |
| 1801 | 80,584 | +6.9% |
| 1811 | 94,168 | +16.9% |
| 1813 | 88,336 | −6.2% |
| 1816 | 80,205 | −9.2% |
| 1821 | 107,570 | +34.1% |
| 1831 | 112,558 | +4.6% |
| 1841 | 115,491 | +2.6% |
| 1851 | 82,348 | −28.7% |
| 1861 | 71,694 | −12.9% |
| 1871 | 64,501 | −10.0% |
| 1881 | 61,009 | −5.4% |
| 1891 | 52,647 | −13.7% |
| 1901 | 46,672 | −11.3% |
| 1911 | 43,820 | −6.1% |
| 1926 | 39,847 | −9.1% |
| 1936 | 37,847 | −5.0% |
| 1946 | 36,218 | −4.3% |
| 1951 | 34,553 | −4.6% |
| 1956 | 32,969 | −4.6% |
| 1961 | 30,643 | −7.1% |
| 1966 | 28,989 | −5.4% |
| 1971 | 28,250 | −2.5% |
| 1979 | 30,785 | +9.0% |
| 1981 | 31,140 | +1.2% |
| 1986 | 31,496 | +1.1% |
| 1991 | 30,296 | −3.8% |
| 1996 | 30,166 | −0.4% |
| 2002 | 31,068 | +3.0% |
| 2006 | 34,391 | +10.7% |
| 2011 | 38,970 | +13.3% |
| 2016 | 40,873 | +4.9% |
| 2022 | 46,634 | +14.1% |

With an area of 1,091 km^{2} (421 sq mi) and a population of 46,634, Longford is the fourth smallest of the 32 counties in area and second smallest in terms of population. It is also the fourth smallest of Leinster's 12 counties by size and smallest by population. It borders counties Cavan to the northeast, Westmeath to the southeast, Roscommon to the southwest and Leitrim to the northwest.

Longford's population growth during the period 2002–2006 (10.6%) has been stronger than the National average (8.2%).

Agriculture is an important facet in the way of life and for the economy in County Longford. There are 73,764 hectares of area (67.6% of the county's total area) farmed in the county. There are approximately 126,904 cattle in the county too.

== People ==
- Willie Browne (1936–2004), Republic of Ireland international footballer
- Padraic Colum (1881–1972), writer
- Francis Ysidro Edgeworth (1845–1926), philosopher, economist, mathematician
- Maria Edgeworth (1768–1849), writer, lived at Edgeworthstown House
- Albert Reynolds (1932–2014), politician, former Taoiseach

== See also ==
- List of abbeys and priories in the Republic of Ireland (County Longford)
- List of National Monuments in County Longford
- Lord Lieutenant of Longford
- High Sheriff of Longford
- Category:People from County Longford

== References and notes ==
=== Secondary references ===
==== Medieval history ====
- MacGivney, Joseph (1908). Place-names of County Longford : collected from various sources. Dublin : J. Duffy.
- Ó Duígeannáin, Mícheál (1934). "Notes on the History of the Kingdom of Bréifne". The Journal of the Royal Society of Antiquaries of Ireland. The Journal of the Royal Society of Antiquaries of Ireland, Volumes 64–65 (1) (Digitized 2008 from original at the University of California ed.). Royal Society of Antiquaries of Ireland: 113–140. JSTOR 25513764.
- Dobbs, Margaret E. (1938). "The Territory and People of Tethba". The Journal of the Royal Society of Antiquaries of Ireland. Seventh Series, Vol. 8, No. 2 (2). Royal Society of Antiquaries of Ireland: 241–259. JSTOR 25510138.
- MacCotter, Paul (2008). Medieval Ireland: territorial, political and economic divisions (illustrated ed.). Four Courts Press. ISBN 9781846820984.
