= River Camlin =

River in Ireland, tributary of the Shannon

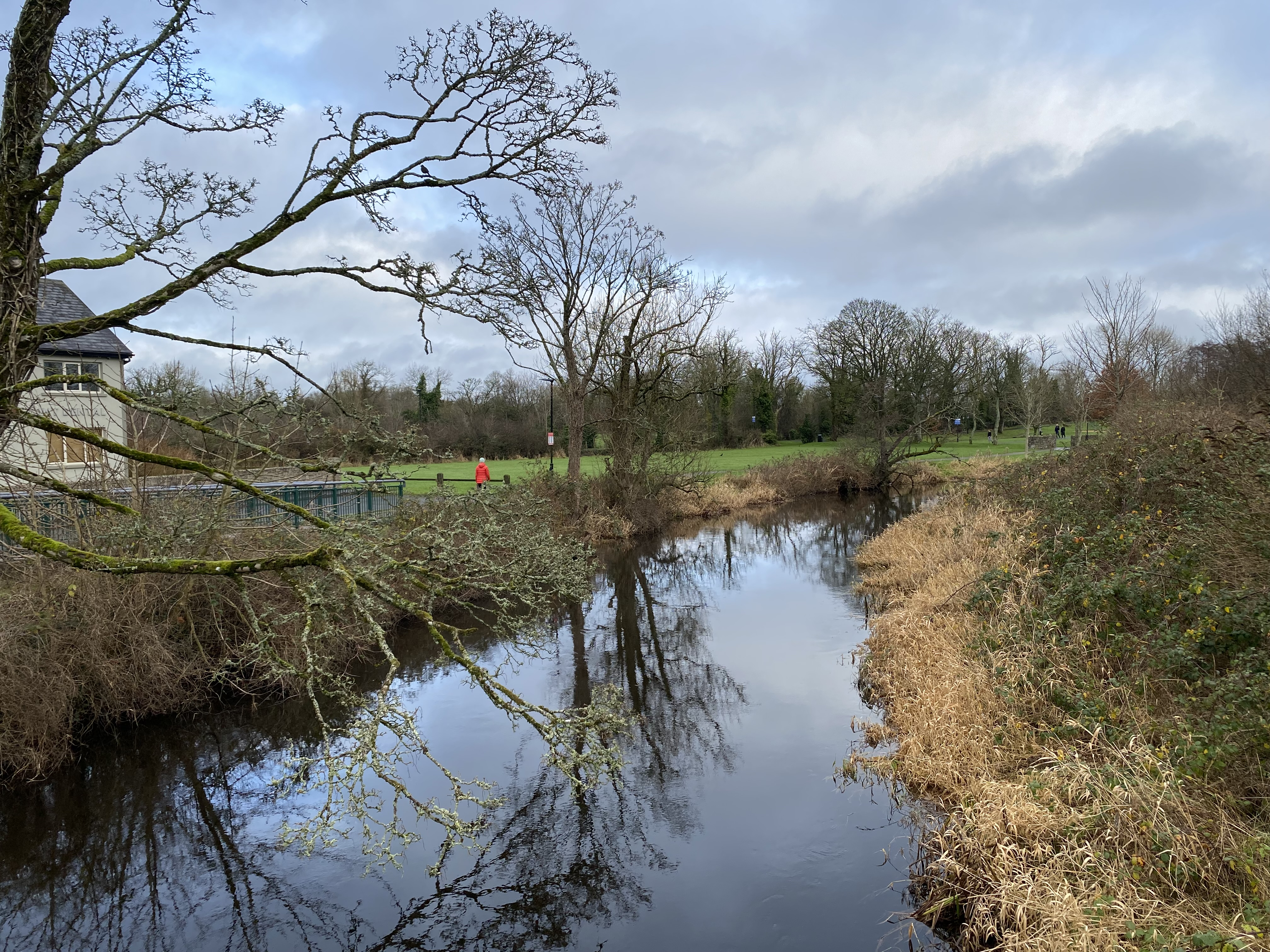
- River Camlin in town of Longford
- Etymology: Crooked Pool
- Native name: An Chamlinn (Irish)

Physical characteristics
- Source: Granard
- Mouth: Shannon

The River Camlin (Irish An Chamlinn - Crooked Pool) is a tributary of the River Shannon. It rises near Granard, flowing through Clonbroney, Ballinalee, Killoe and Longford Town. Downstream from Longford town, the Camlin splits into two distributories: the larger branch joining the Shannon near Cloondara lock.

The Camlin is navigable for part of its course. It is popular with freshwater anglers as it has stocks of perch, bream, brown trout, eel, rudd, and roach, and to a lesser extent, pike.
