= Legan, County Longford =

Legan An Liagán Lenamore (An Léana Mór)
- Village
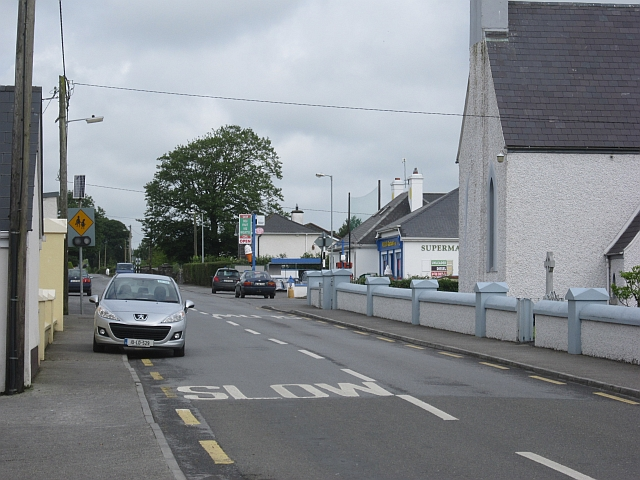
- Legan's main street

- Location in Ireland
- Coordinates: 53°37′N 7°37′W
- Country: Ireland
- Province: Leinster
- County: County Longford

Population (2016)
  - Total: 215

Legan (Irish: An Liagán, meaning 'the standing stone') is a village in County Longford, Ireland. As of the 2016 census, the village population was 215.

== Name ==
The village of Legan, situated in the townland of Smithfield, is also known as Lenamore (Irish: An Léana Mór, meaning 'the great water-meadow') after the local watercourse the Lenamore Stream. Legan comes from 'Legan Bridge', a bridge which crosses the stream and which takes its name from the adjoining townland of Legan on the other side of the stream. The bridge spans the stream at the entrance to the village and has been a local feature since about 1775. The names therefore come from the proximity of the village to the bridge and the stream. The actual townland of Legan had an ancient enclosure called 'Legan Rock' which gives rise to the meaning of the name.

== Transport ==
Legan is approximately 3 km from the N55 and 10 km from the N4 roads. It is approximately 11 km from Edgeworthstown railway station.

== Tidy towns ==
Legan received a total of 271 marks in category A of the Tidy Towns Competition 2016, placing it fourth of 13 villages in that category in County Longford.

== Sport ==
The local GAA club is Legan Sarsfields, which was fielding teams in the Longford Intermediate Football Championship as of 2017.
