= Cairn Hill transmission site =

Transmitter in County Longford, Ireland

Cairn Hill
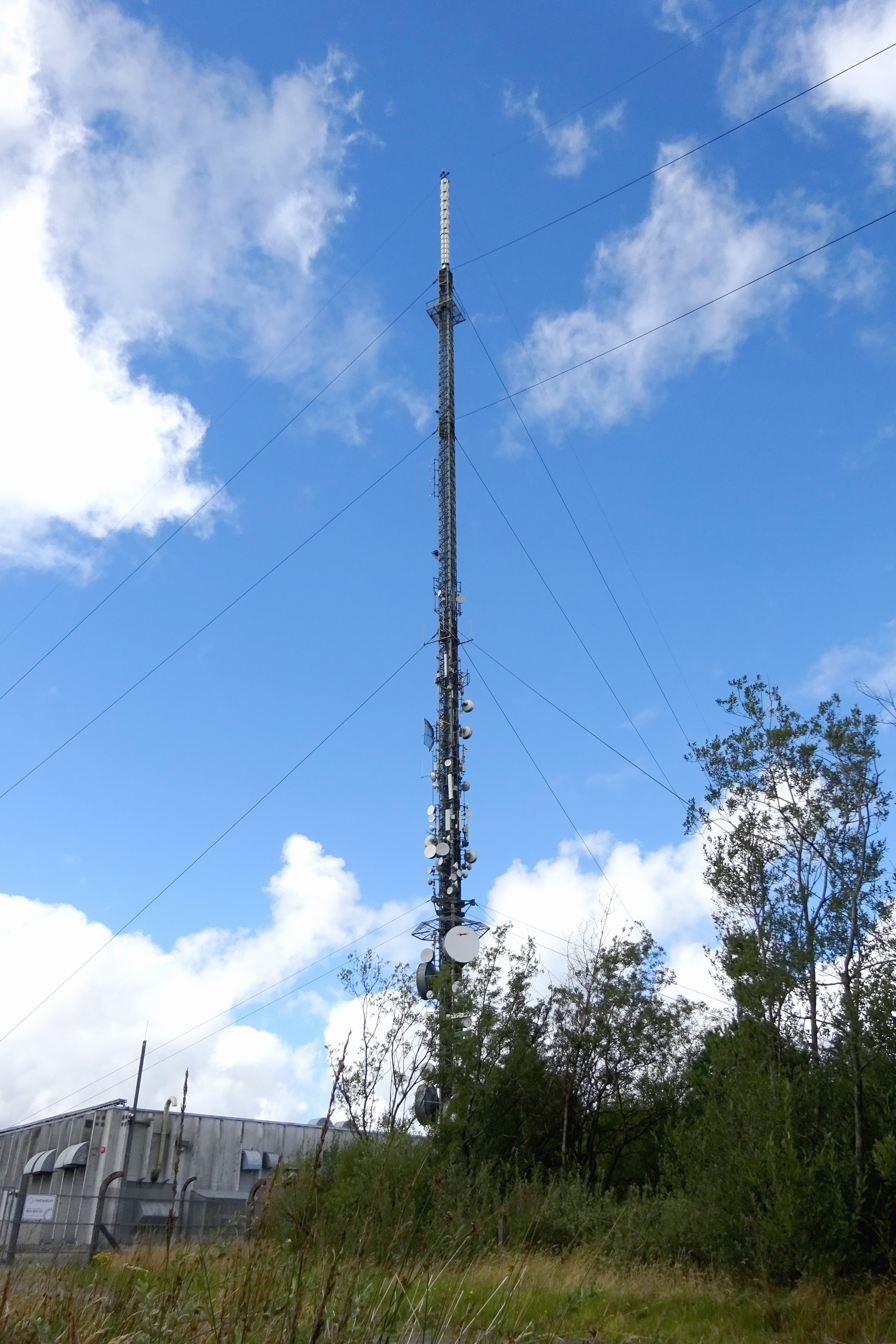
- Cairn Hill mast and equipment building

- Cairn Hill in Ireland
- Location: Corneddan, County Longford
- Mast height: 144.5 metres (474 ft)
- Coordinates: 53°48′26″N 7°42′55″W
- Built: 1978

The Cairn Hill transmission site is a radio and television broadcasting facility located on a 277 metre hill (Carn Clonhugh) at Dernacross, 10 km northeast of Longford town in County Longford, Ireland.

== History ==
Cairn Hill was the first of two new UHF television transmission sites to be opened in Ireland by RTÉ in 1978, the other being Three Rock in County Dublin. This was to facilitate the introduction of the second television channel RTÉ 2 on UHF, as all the available VHF frequencies were in use by existing transmitters in Ireland. The site was located to cover an area of poor reception in the Irish midlands, and when it opened it was the most powerful television transmitter in all of Ireland, with an Effective Radiated Power (ERP) of 800 kW. In later years another two television channels were added, TG4 and TV3.

Digital terrestrial television (DTT) broadcasts began from Cairn Hill in February 2009, with analogue television services subsequently ending nationally on 24 October 2012. Today the transmission site, owned and operated by 2RN (a subsidiary of RTÉ), provides the Irish national DTT service Saorview to an extensive area in central Ireland and also into Northern Ireland.

FM radio transmission from the site began in 2005 with only RTÉ Radio 1 being broadcast, but since 2023 all four RTÉ national stations, along with independent national stations Today FM, Newstalk, and local station iRadio, are broadcast from the site.

== Current transmissions ==
=== Digital television ===
Frequency	UHF	ERP	Multiplex	Pol
682 MHz	47	160 kw	Saorview 1	H
658 MHz	44	160 kw	Saorview 2	H

=== FM radio ===
Frequency	ERP	Service
89.8 MHz	20 kw	RTÉ Radio 1
92.0 MHz	20 kw	RTÉ 2fm
99.4 MHz	20 kw	RTÉ lyric fm
94.2 MHz	20 kw	RTÉ Raidió na Gaeltachta
101.6 MHz	20 kw	Today FM
103.1 MHz	5 kw	iRadio
106.9 MHz	5 kw	Newstalk
99.8 MHz	10 kw	Temporary Services, Christmas FM

=== Cairn Hill relay transmitters ===
DTT relay	County	Mux 1	Mux 2	ERP	Pol
Kilduff	Tipperary	31	37	25 kw	H
Monaghan	Monaghan	40	43	2 kw	H

== Gallery ==
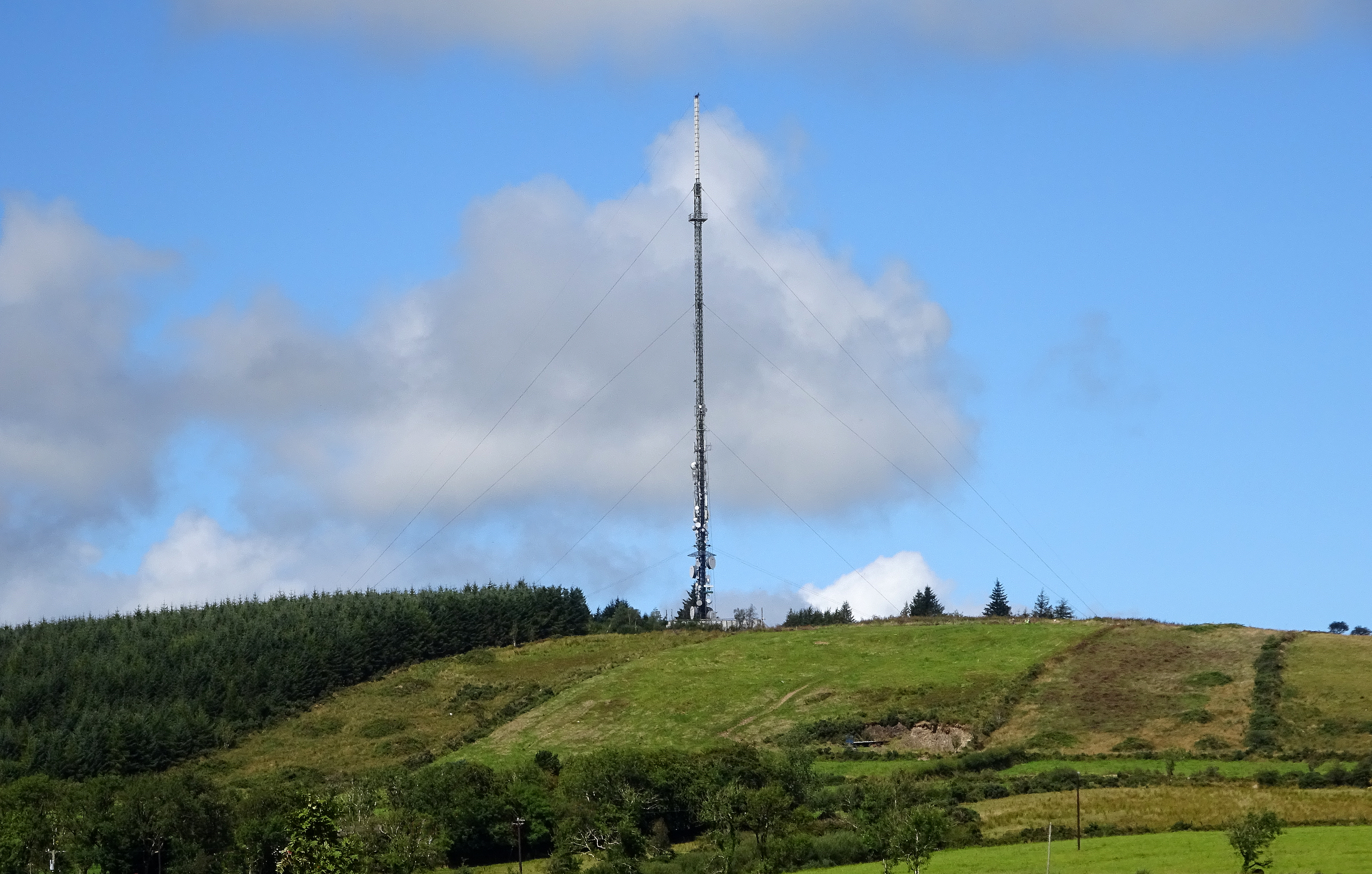

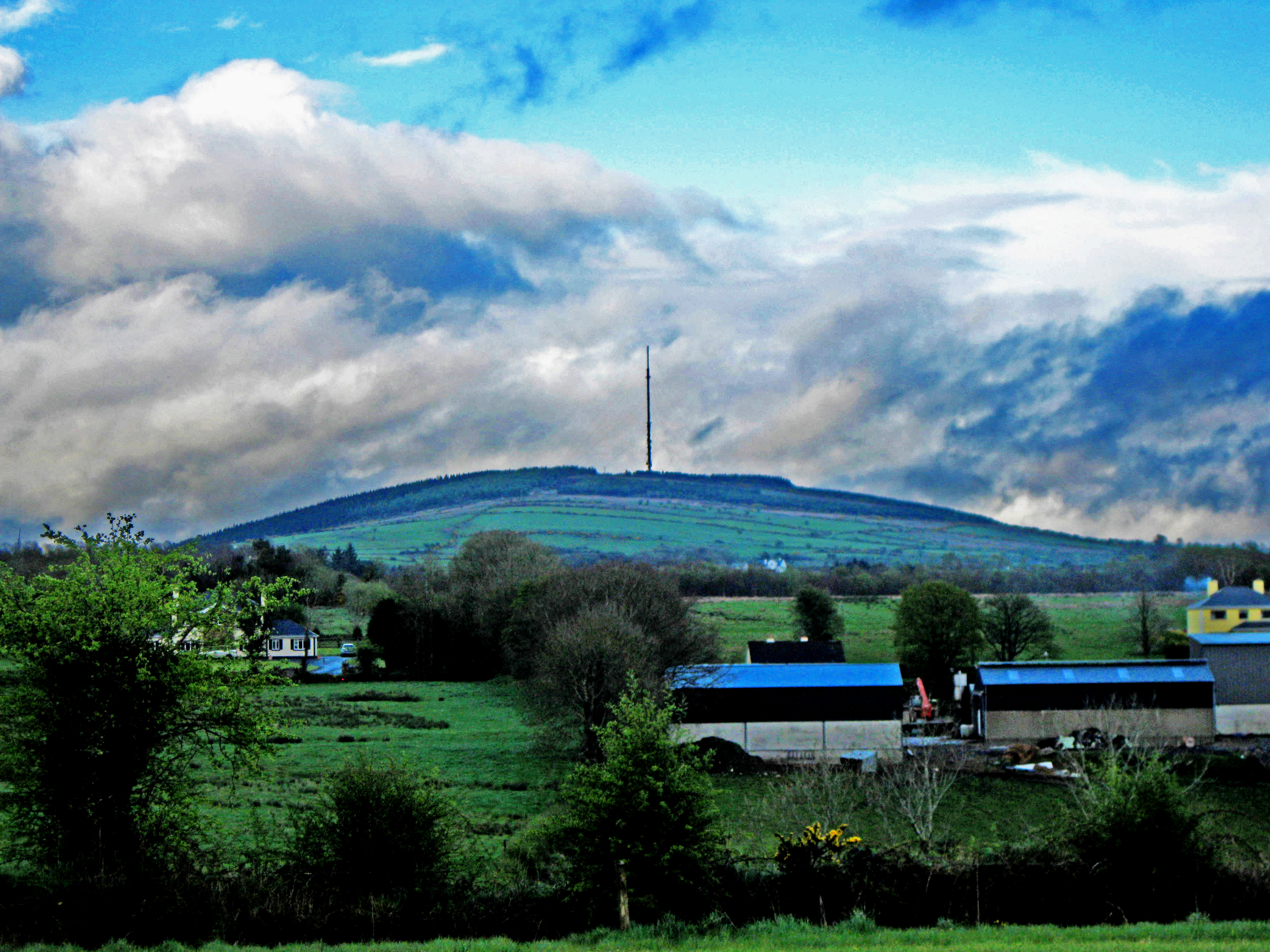

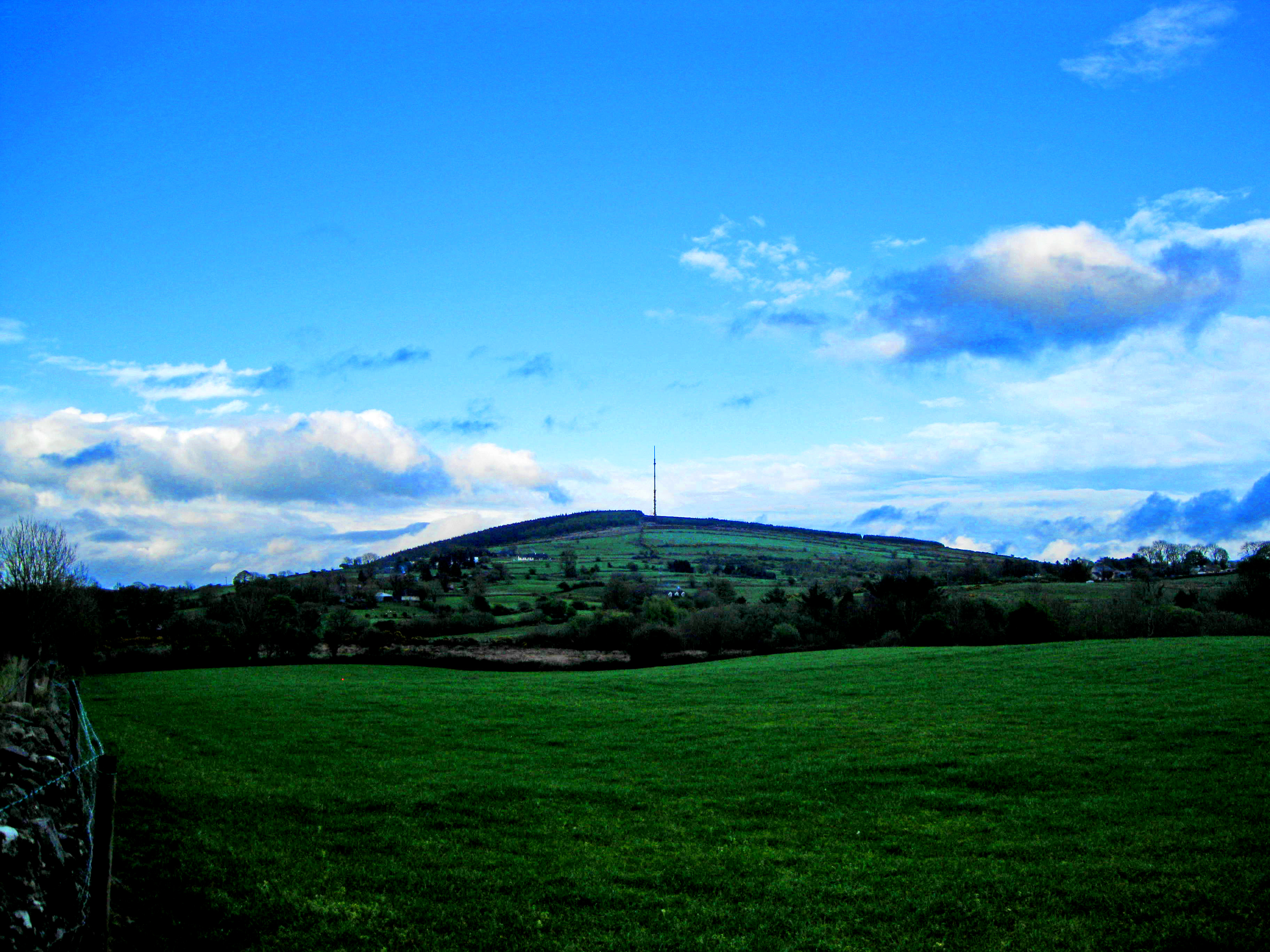

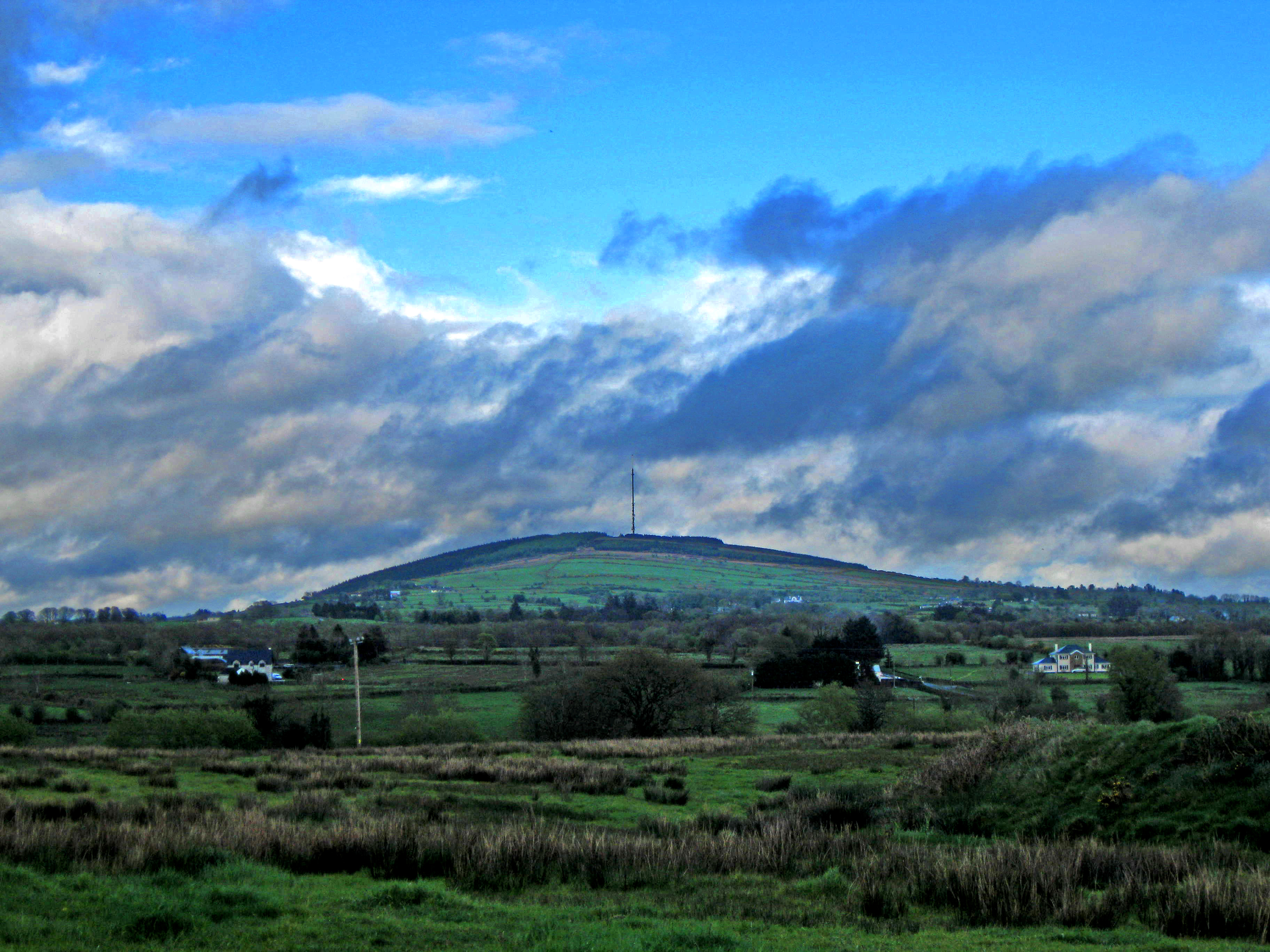

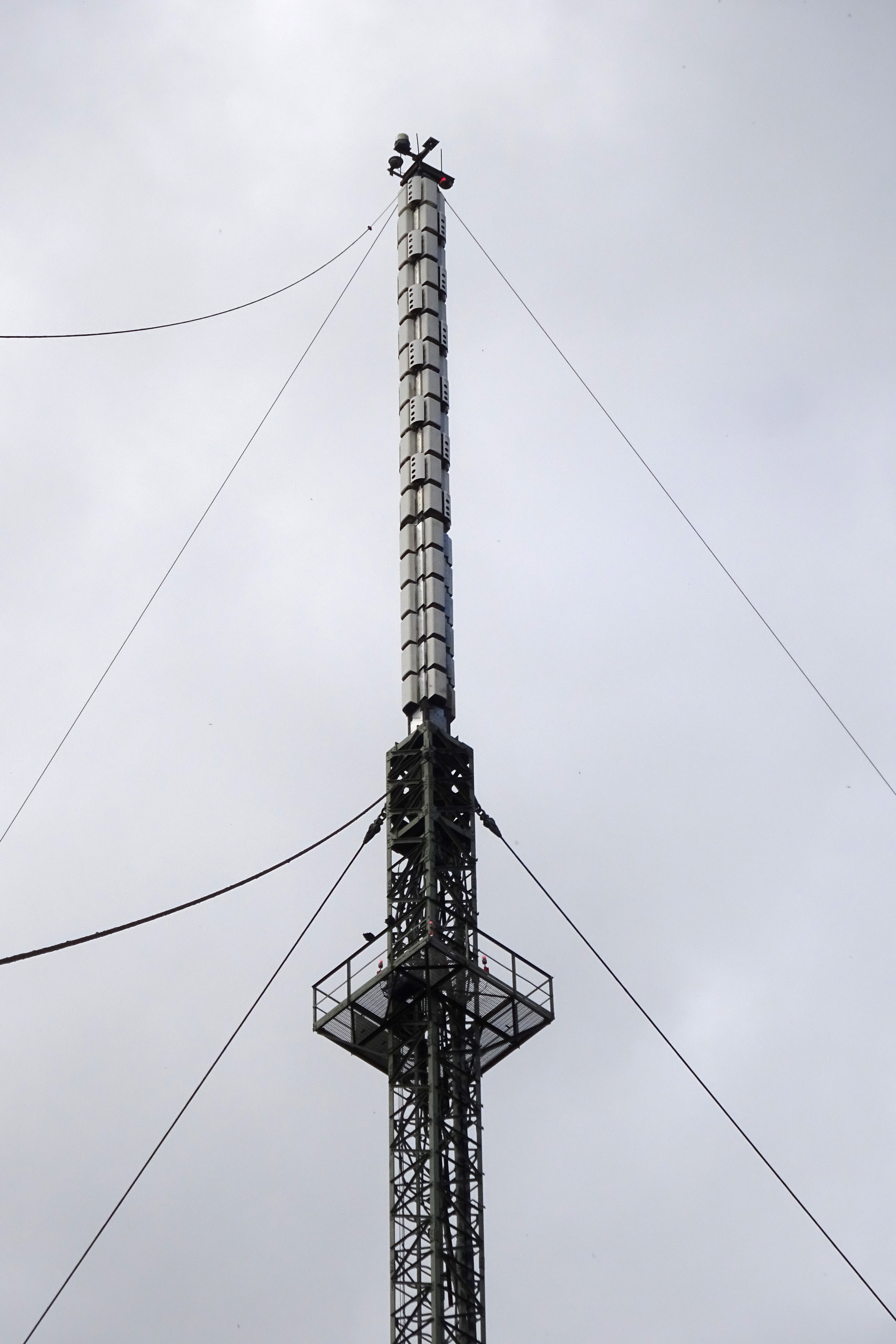

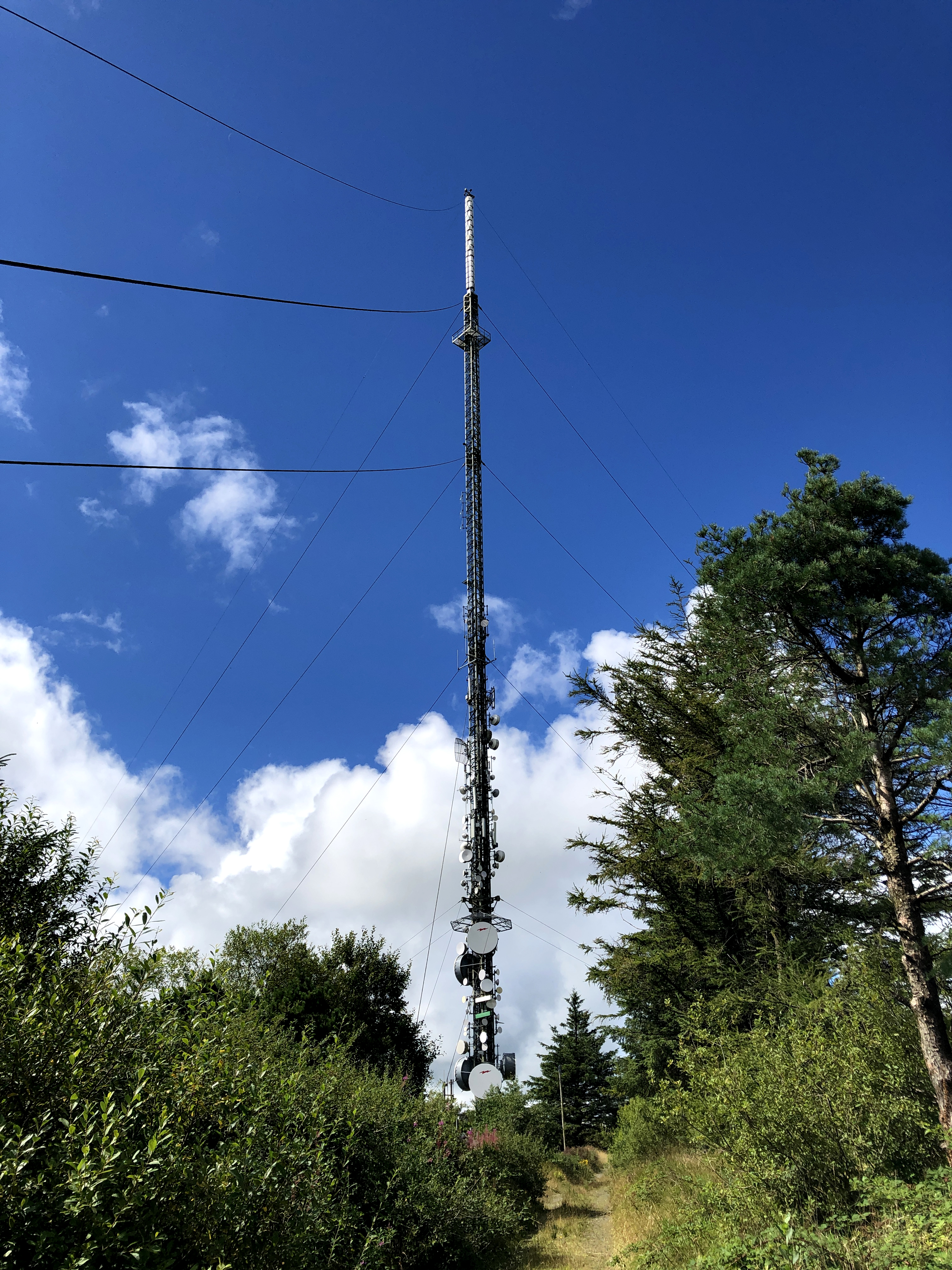
