= Moydow (barony) =

Moydow Maigh Dumha (Irish)
- Barony
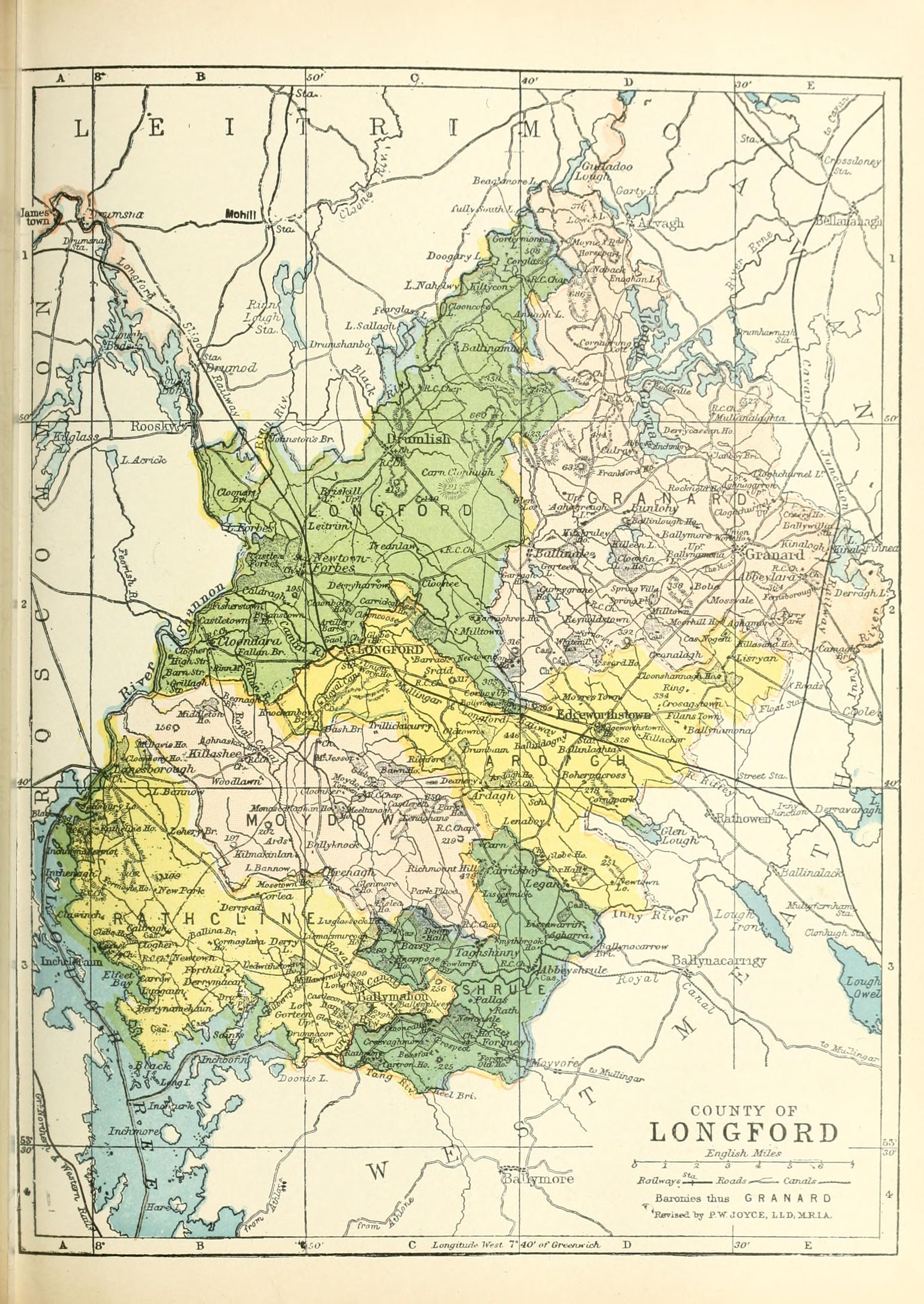
- Baronies of County Longford. Moydow is shaded pink.
- Sovereign state: Ireland
- County: Longford

Area
  - Total: 139.5 km^{2} (53.9 sq mi)

Moydow (Irish: Maigh Dumha) is a barony in County Longford, Ireland.

== Etymology ==
Moydow barony takes its name from the village of Moydow (from Irish Maigh Dumha, "plain of the mound").

== Location ==
Moydow barony is located in central County Longford, stretching from the River Shannon to Richmount Hill.

== History ==
Anciently Moydow barony was part of a territory known as Tethbae. The barony was formed from the territories of Clanawlye (Ardagh & Moydow), and parts of the territories of Moybrawne (Taghshinny parish), Clanconnor (part Kilcommock, part Cashel parishes) and Muintergalgan.

== List of settlements ==
Below is a list of settlements in Moydow barony:

- Keenagh (northern part)
- Killashee
- Moydow
