= Granard (barony) =

Granard Gránard (Irish)
- Barony
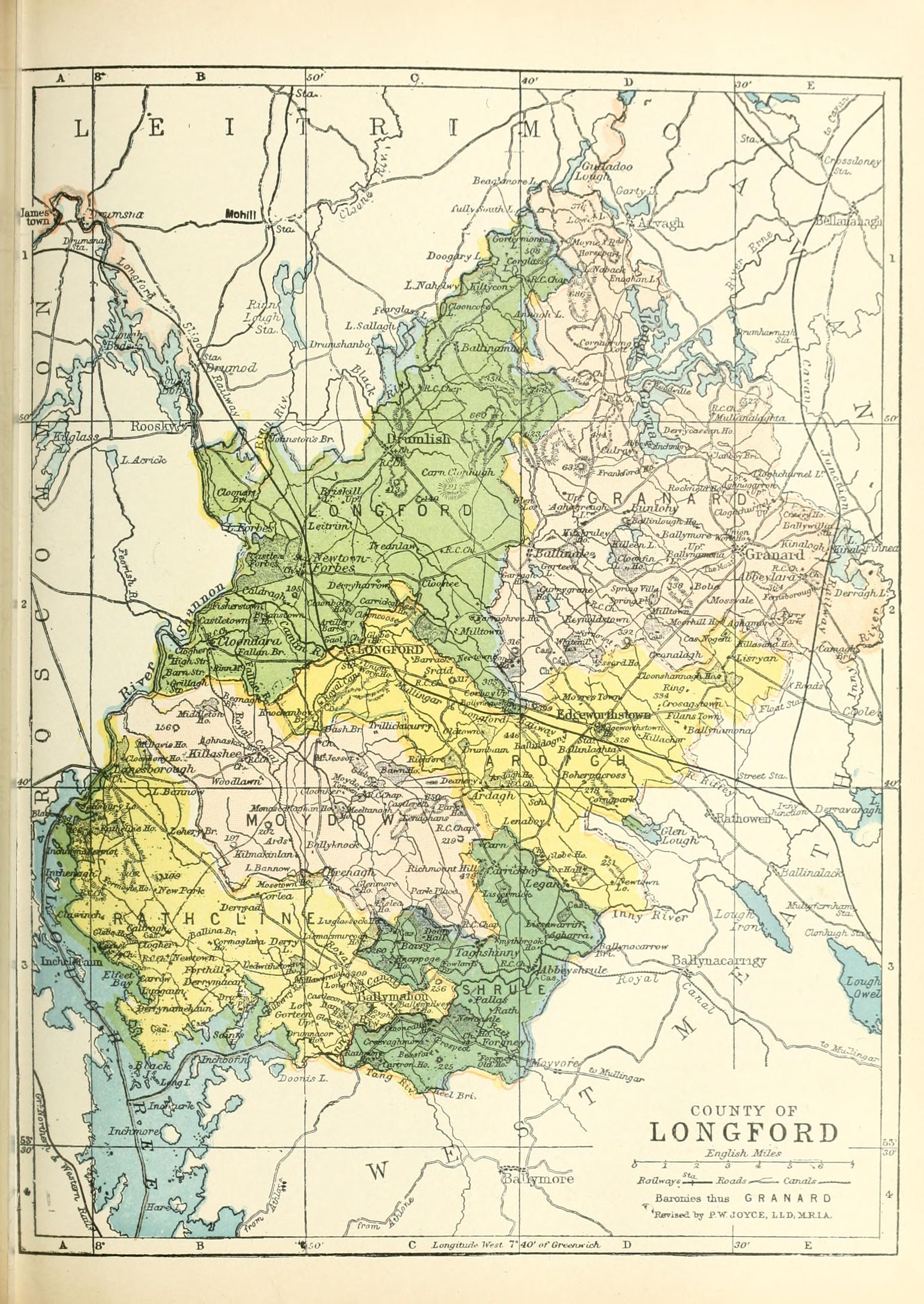
- Baronies of County Longford. Granard is shaded pink.
- Sovereign state: Ireland
- County: Longford

Area
  - Total: 258.42 km^{2} (99.78 sq mi)

Granard (Irish: Gránard) is a barony in County Longford, Ireland.

== Etymology ==
Granard barony derives its name from the village of Granard (Irish Gránard, possibly meaning "sun height" or "corn height").

== Location ==
Granard barony is located in northeastern County Longford and contains Lough Gowna and many other lakes.

== List of settlements ==
Below is a list of settlements in Granard barony:

- Abbeylara
- Ballinalee
- Granard
