= Farmers' Freedom Force (Ireland) =

Irish quasi-paramilitary organisation

Farmers' Freedom Force (FFF)
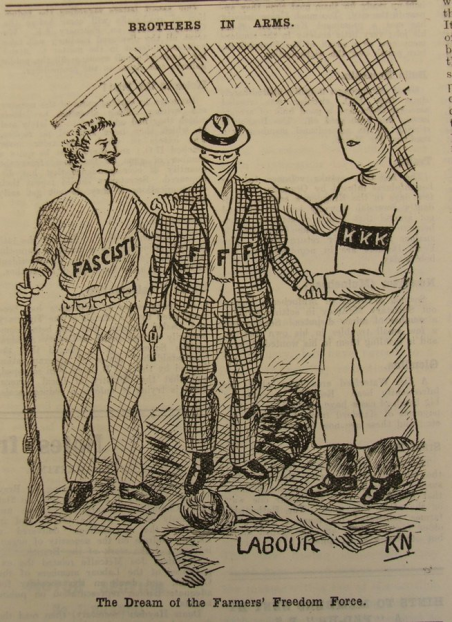
- A poster made to compare the FFF to that of the Blackshirts and KKK, made by labour activists.
- Leader: Irish Farmers' Union
- Dates active: 1922 – end 1923
- Allegiance: Irish Free State
- Active regions: Ireland, particularly Munster and Leinster.
- Size: ~600
- Wars: Irish Civil War

The Farmers' Freedom Force or White Guards was a quasi-paramilitary active during the Irish Civil War. During the Irish War of Independence, the western rural parts of Ireland had been engulfed in semi-active conflicts over land, leading to various deaths during the period unrelated to the war. As the Irish Civil War approached the island however, things began to become more complicated. Within the Irish Citizen Army, a portion of the group had grown disillusioned and joined the Communist Party of Ireland's armed wing, the Red Guards, which had formed early in 1922. This Red Guards faction would fight in the Civil War, mainly in the Battle of Dublin, though some allegedly related parts of the group worked in support of the Irish soviets in the West.

== War against the ITGWU ==
In the latter half of 1921 to 1922, the ITGWU (very closely associated to both the ICA and Red Guards) had begun to expand itself in Western Ireland, assisting the soviets which sprung up. As a result, the Irish Farmers' Union (IFU) would set up a quasi-paramilitary wing, though it would not be very centralized yet. This wing would be titled the Farmers' Freedom Force (FFF) and would mostly spend their time clashing with farm workers with the support of their tenants and landlords.

== Involvement in the Civil War ==
The FFF would quickly become sucked into the Irish Civil War as it, by 1923, began to be incorporated into the Irish Free State. By now, it began to be fully constructed, with the government modelling the group off of the Ku Klux Klan in the United States of America. Along with this, their stance against the ITGWU, which was connected to the Irish Citizen Army and Red Guards who were working with the Anti-Treaty Irish Republican Army, made them automatic allies of the Free State. Around this time, they numbered 600 members and were mostly focused on shootings and arson attacks.

== Examples of FFF operations ==
During February 1923, the FFF burnt down haggards in Athy in response to the increasing number of farmer strikes. Along with this, the homes of workers on strike would be vandalised and burnt down on occasion. On 28 February 1923, the FFF assaulted the owner of a threshing engine in Bennettsbridge, damaging his threshing machine and straw elevator as well. As clashes drew dangerously common, the National Army was sent in to occupy the Town Hall from 9 March to 24 November 1923.

== Disappearance ==
The FFF never officially dissolved, though after 1923 it effectively vanished from the island. This was partially as a result of a decrease in political violence among other things.
