= Cavan =

County town of Cavan, Ireland

Cavan An Cabhán (Irish)
- Town
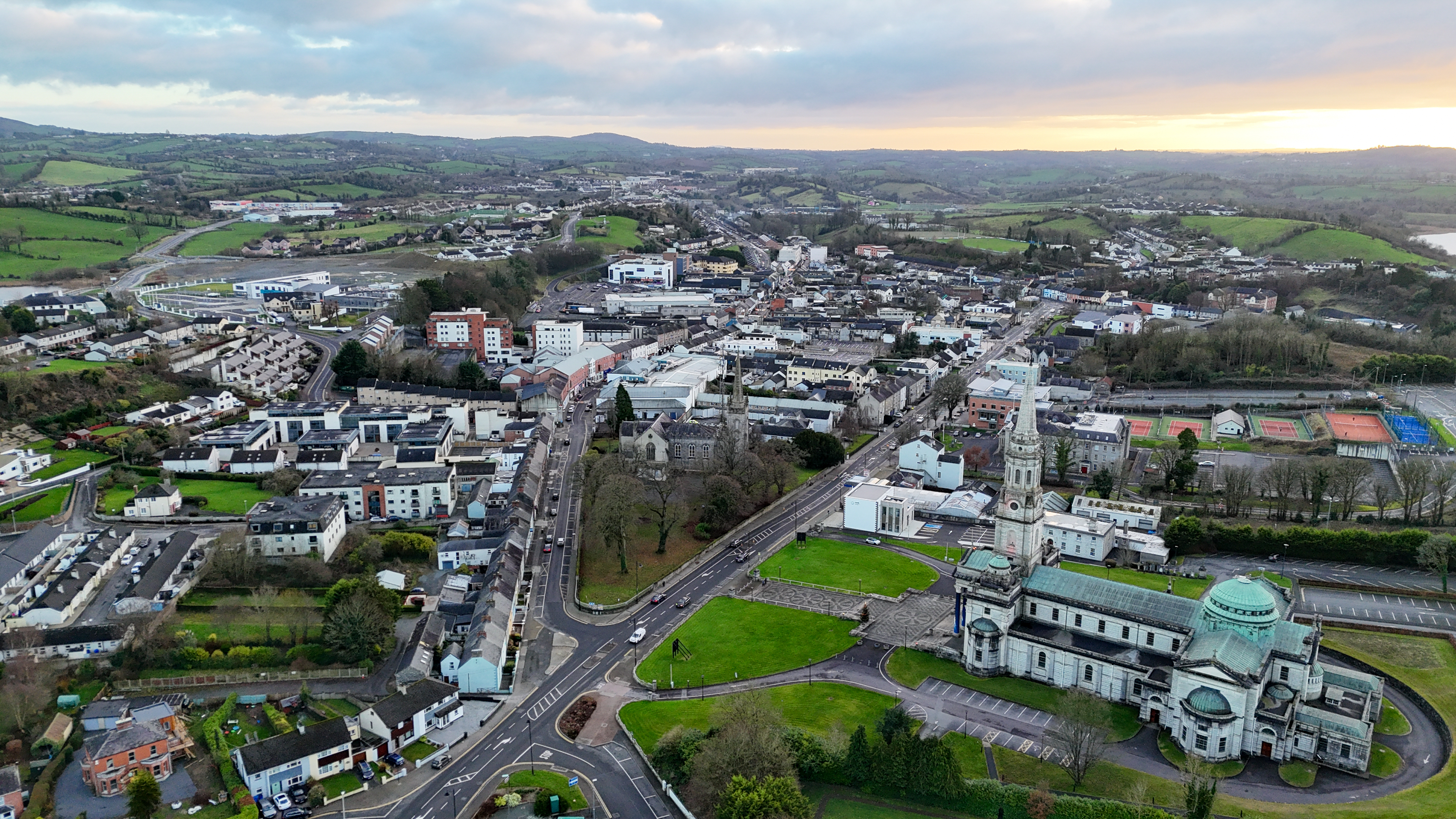
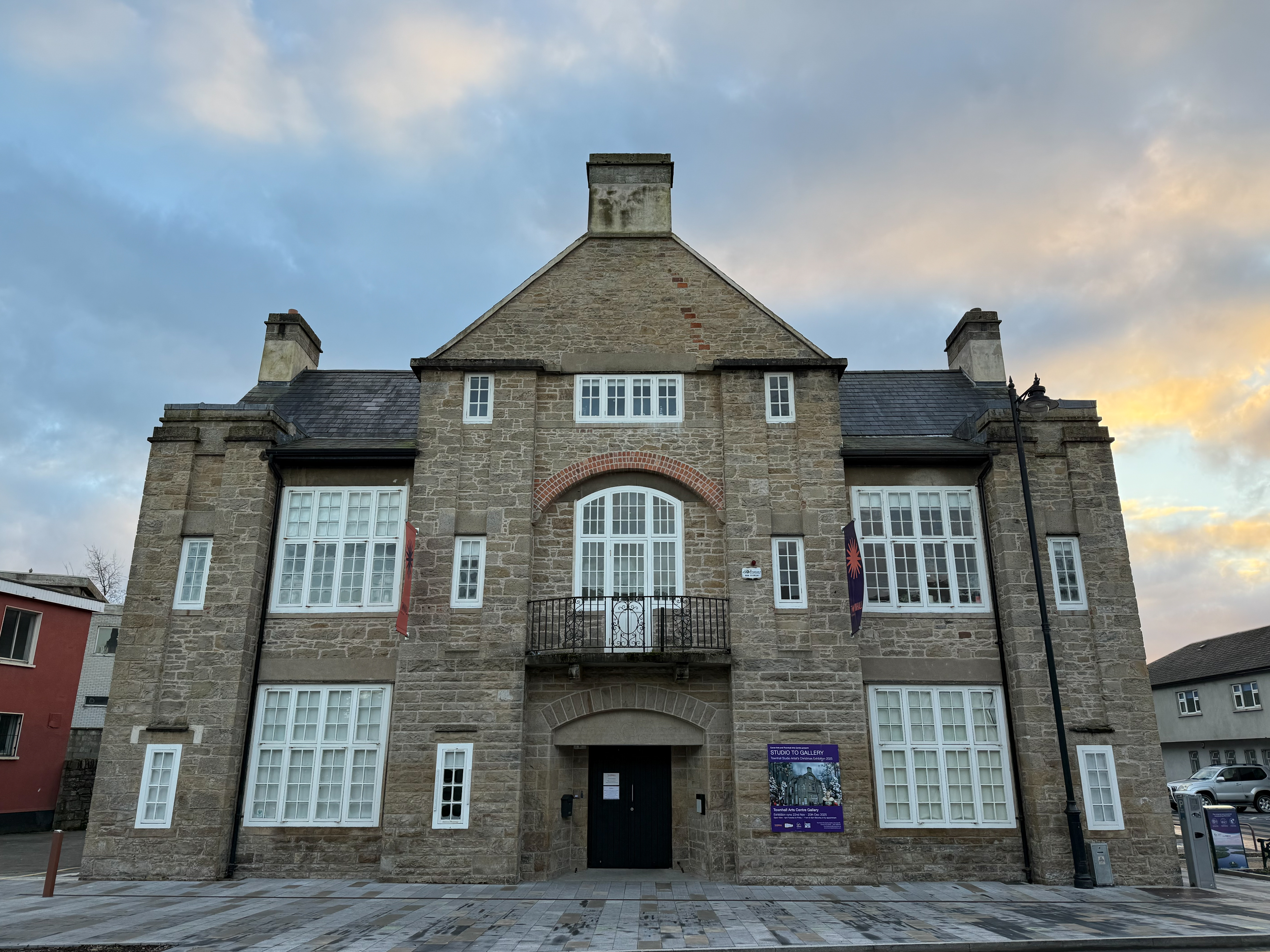
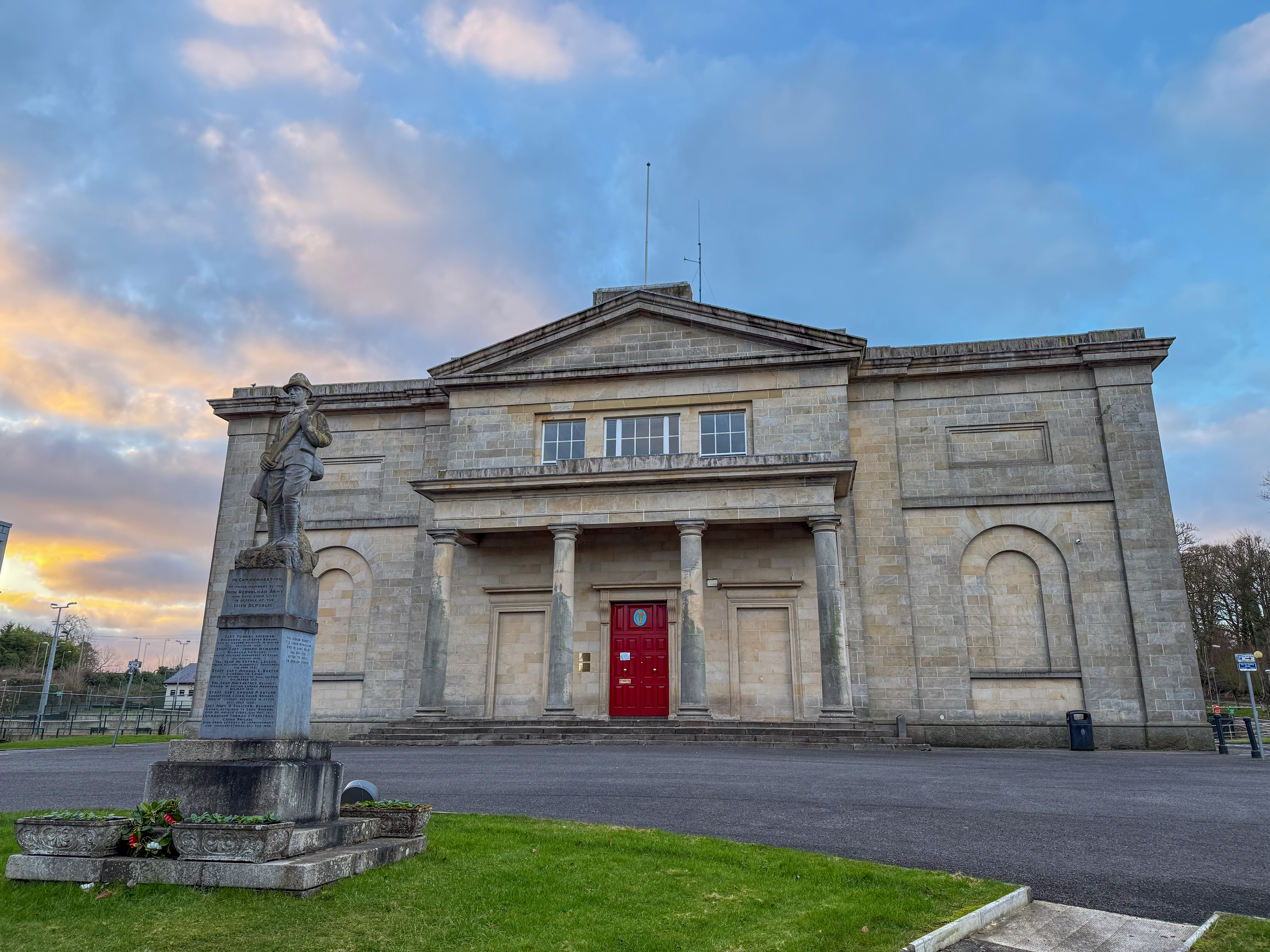
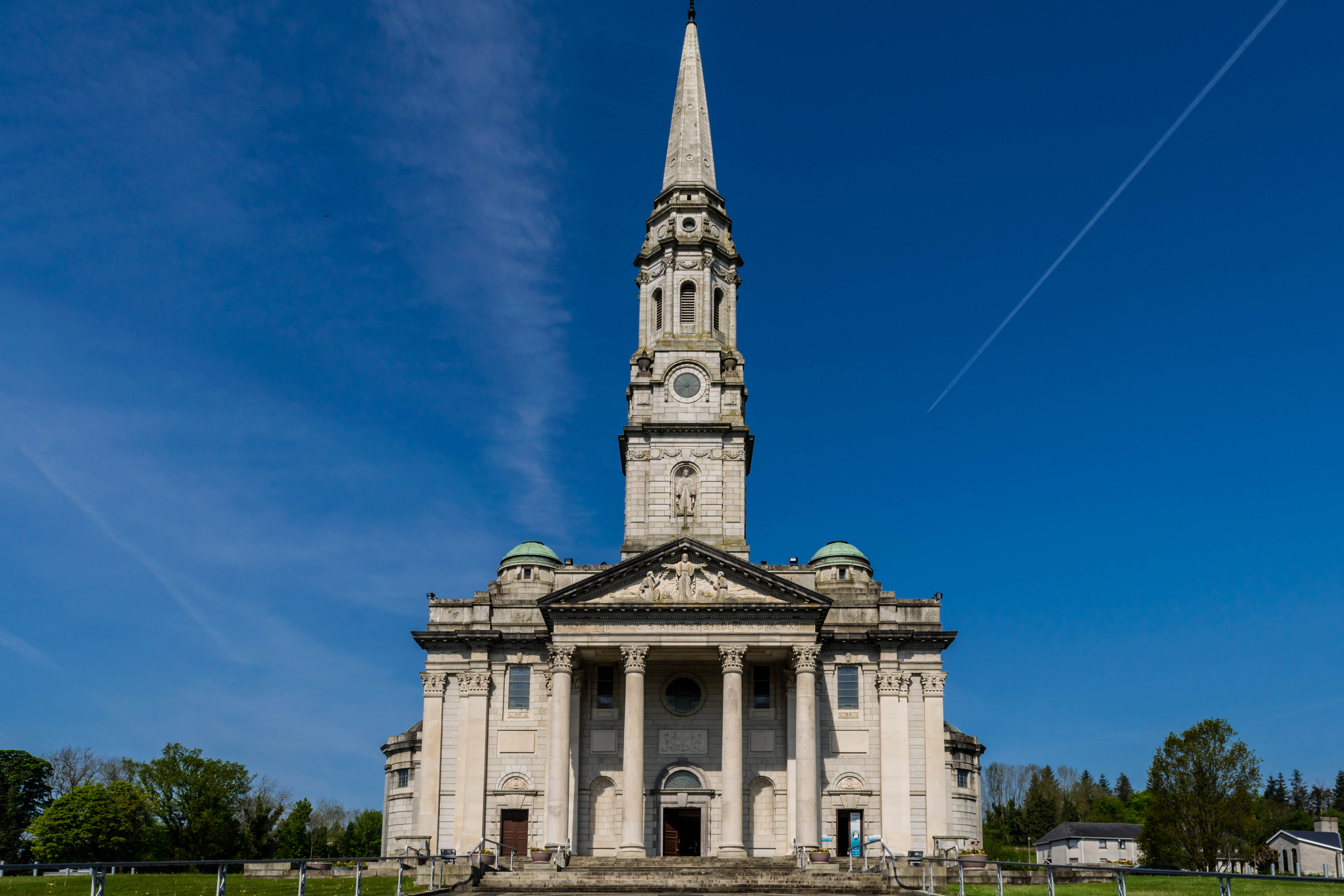
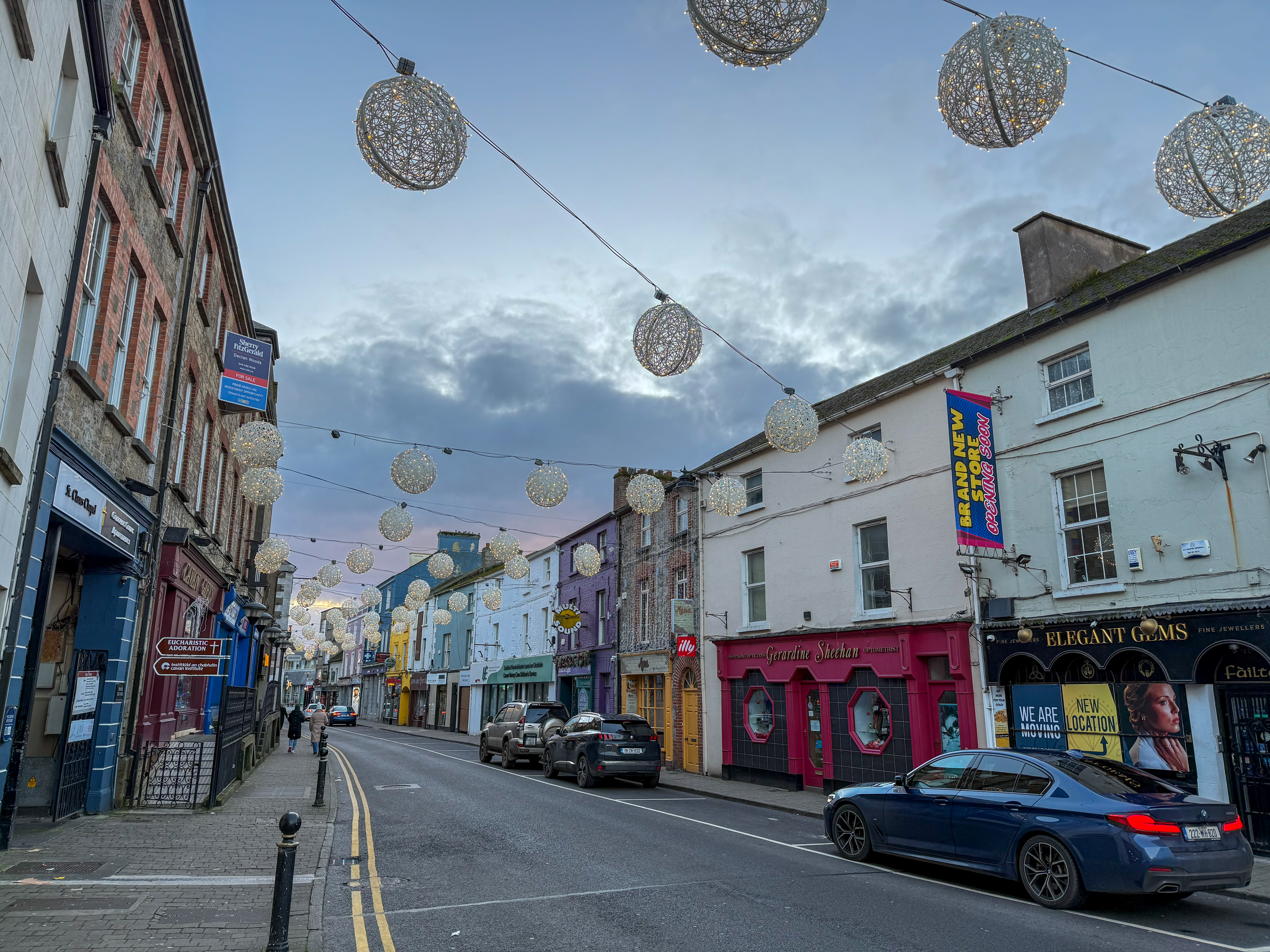
- Town skyline Cavan Town Hall Cavan Courthouse Cavan Cathedral Main Street

- Location in Ireland
- Coordinates: 53.9910°N 7.3601°W
- Country: Ireland
- Province: Ulster
- County: County Cavan
- Barony: Loughtee Upper
- Elevation: 113 m (371 ft)

Population (2022)
  - Total: 11,741
- Time zone: UTC±0 (WET)
  - Summer (DST): UTC+1 (IST)
- Eircode routing key: H12
- Telephone area code: +353(0)49
- Irish Grid Reference: H419041
- Website: thisiscavan.ie

Cavan (/ˈkævən/ KAV-ən; Irish: An Cabhán, meaning 'the hollow') is the county town of County Cavan in Ireland. The town lies in Ulster, near the border with County Fermanagh in Northern Ireland. The town is bypassed by the main N3 road that links Dublin (to the south) with Enniskillen, Ballyshannon and Donegal Town (to the north).

== History ==
=== Gaelic Cavan 1300–1607 ===
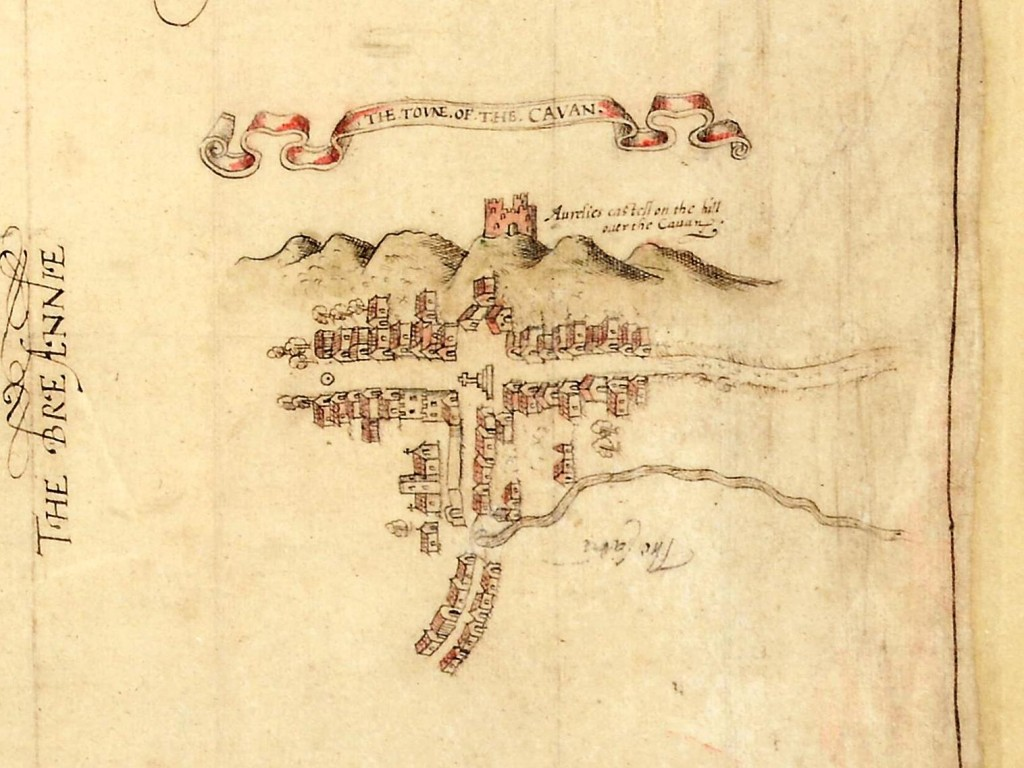
Map of Cavan town from 1591 showing its market square and the O'Reilly castle on Tullymongan Hill

Cavan was founded by the Irish clan chief and Lord of East Breifne, Giolla Íosa Ruadh O’Reilly, between 1300 and his death in 1330. During his lordship, a friary run by the Dominican Order was established close to the O’Reilly stronghold at Tullymongan and was at the centre of the settlement close to a crossing over the river and to the town's marketplace. It is recorded that the (Cavan) Dominicans were expelled in 1393, replaced by an Order of Conventual Franciscan friars. The friary's location is marked by an eighteenth-century tower in the graveyard at Abbey Street which appears to incorporate remains of the original medieval friary tower. The imprint of the medieval town can be followed in the area of Abbey Street, Bridge Street and Main Street (townlands of Tullymongan Upper and Lower).

Clan O'Reilly later built a new castle in the late fourteenth century on Tullymongan Hill, overlooking the town centre. In the 15th century, the local ruler, Bearded Owen O'Reilly, expanded the town marketplace which attracted merchants from Dublin and Drogheda. The phrase "life of Reilly" is believed to derive from the great wealth and power of the Chief of Clan O'Reilly, some of which came from the market. The Chiefs also allowed, however, counterfeit English and Scottish coins to be minted in their territory at this time.

During the Elizabethan era religious persecution of the Catholic Church in Ireland, Archbishop Dermot O'Hurley, who would be one of the most celebrated of the 24 Irish Catholic Martyrs, was covertly sheltered by Thomas Fleming, 10th Baron Slane at Slane Castle, where the Archbishop was allegedly concealed inside a priest hole, but from whence O'Hurley covertly travelled to and from Cavan to visit with some fellow priests whom he had known while living in Catholic Europe.

=== Early modern history ===
King James I granted the town a charter in 1611. This also entitled Cavan town to send two members to the Irish parliament. In February 1690, during the Glorious Revolution, the Battle of Cavan took place after Williamite Inniskillinger forces led by Colonel William Wolseley attacked the strategic fort overlooking Cavan town at Tullamongan which was held then by the Duke of Berwick Jacobite army. During the battle, much of the town was burned by Colonel Wolseley's soldiers, and Jacobite general William Nugent was killed. Later, during the 18th century, local administrative influence and power passed to the Maxwell family, descendants of Robert Maxwell, Church of Ireland Bishop of Kilmore (1643–1672), a family who later entered the peerage as Baron Farnham.

Farnham House, located at Farnham, a small rural district to the north-west of Cavan, is one of the largest country houses in the county. It was built for Barry Maxwell, 3rd Lord Farnham (later created, by the second creation, Earl of Farnham), head of the Maxwell dynasty, around 1780. The house was designed by James Wyatt. It was extended in 1810 to the design of Francis Johnston, a County Armagh-born but Dublin-based architect. It was sold by Diana, Lady Farnham (widow of Barry Maxwell, 12th Lord Farnham), to a local entrepreneur in 2001, and the house and estate has per 2006 been converted into a luxury hotel and leisure complex under the Radisson SAS international hotel group.

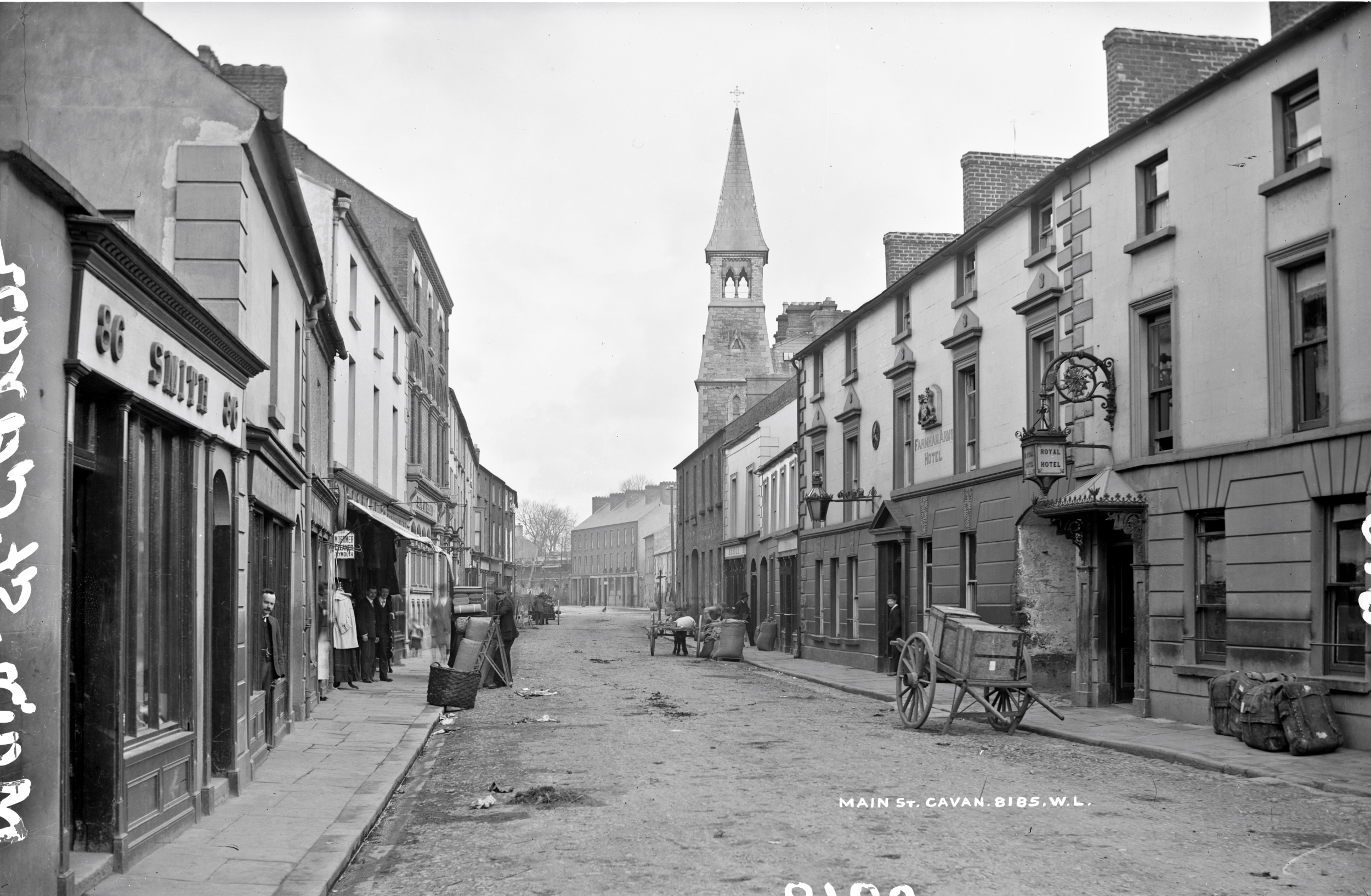
The main street of Cavan, circa the late 19th century

Developments in Cavan during the early 19th century saw the building of a new wide street that still bears the name 'Farnham Street'. This was lined with comfortable townhouses, public buildings (such as Cavan Courthouse which dates from 1824) and churches. From the mid-19th century, Cavan became an important rail junction for the Midland Great Western Railway (MGWR) and the Great Northern Railway (GNR). Cavan Town Hall was built between 1908 and 1910.

=== 20th century ===
The area saw little violence during the 1920-22 troubles in Ulster.

In 1938, work began on the Cathedral of Saints Patrick and Felim; the original Kilmore cathedral was built c.1455, as the main church of the Catholic Diocese of Kilmore located around five kilometres (3 mi) south-west of Cavan Town, on the R198. During the Plantation of Ulster in the seventeenth century, this church became the main Church of Ireland Kilmore Diocese church known as St. Feidhlimidh Cathedral. A new Kilmore Cathedral church was built in 1860 and dedicated to the memory of Bishop William Bedell who died and was buried here in 1642. Bedell was also famously noted for his translation of the old testament Bible into the Irish language. The present Cathedral contains a Hiberno Romanesque doorway dating from c. 1170, in the twelfth century, conjectured locally (but unlikely) originally to have come from Holy Trinity priory located a short distance away upon Trinity Island in Lough Oughter. Holy Trinity priory was built mid-thirteenth century. A short distance from the Kilmore Cathedral is the See House, a late Georgian-style house constructed in the 1830s. This house, designed by William Farrell, was formerly the official residence (or "Bishop's Palace") of the Church of Ireland Bishops of Kilmore, Elphin and Ardagh.

On 23 February 1943, a fire at St Joseph's Orphanage in the town claimed the lives of 35 children and an elderly woman. A public inquiry found no culpability on the part of the nuns who ran the orphanage, but the circumstances surrounding the high death toll in the fire remain controversial to this day. The secretary of the Commission of Enquiry, Brian O'Nolan, is better known to posterity as the writer Flann O'Brien.

The former Cavan Town Royal Irish Constabulary Barracks was demolished in 1968. Its successor stood on the corner of Farnham Street (also known as Casement Street, named after Sir Roger Casement) and Abbey Street. The current Garda station is further along Farnham Street, just across from the courthouse.

=== 21st century ===
In the 1990s and 2000s, Cavan town expanded rapidly with both urban regeneration and suburban expansion. It is one of the main economic hubs of the north central part of Ireland and has a range of financial services, legal, medical, industrial and retail enterprises. The town's main commercial and retail centres are located on Main Street and Farnham Street.

Adjacent to the courthouse is the town's main library. The building, opened in 2006, is officially known as "Johnston Central Library and Farnham Centre". The entrance contains an aquarium with commissioned bog oak sculptures by local artist Joey Burns that portray Cavan history. There is also an arts feature based on Gulliver's Travels in the interior space, and two large paintings by the author PJ Lynch were commissioned by Cavan Library Service, in a tribute to Jonathan Swift and to Cavan where Gulliver's Travels was written.

== Transport ==
=== Road ===
The town is located on the junction of two national routes, the N3 to Dublin and N55 to Athlone. The National Development Plan provides for a major upgrading of the route with an M3 motorway from Kells to Dublin (completed and officially opened on 4 June 2010) and type 2 dual carriageway from Whitegate on the Meath border to Cavan, which will eventually bypass Virginia too. The N3 and N55 eastern bypass around Cavan town was fully completed in March 2006, eliminating the need for heavy traffic to pass through an already congested town.

=== Railway ===
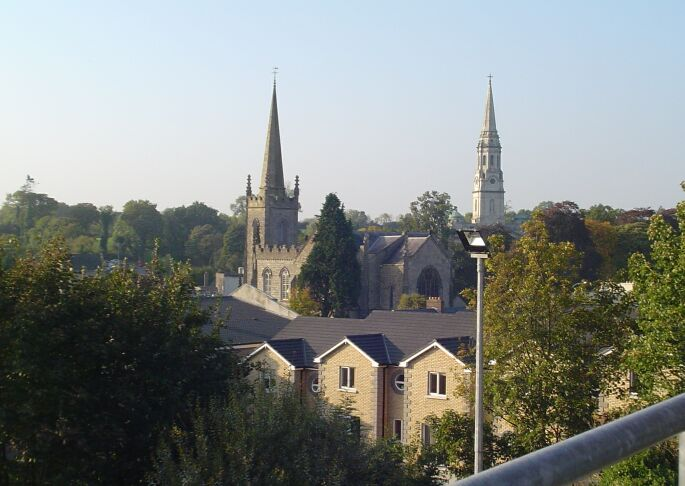
View of Cavan Catholic Cathedral (spire on the right) and the Church of Ireland Parish Church (spire on the left)

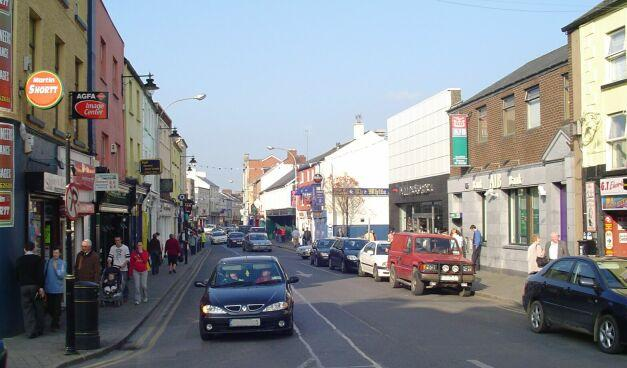
Cavan town centre

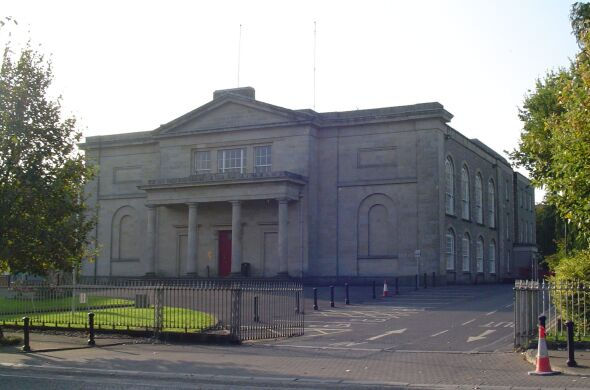
Cavan Courthouse

Although Cavan has no railway links today, there were once two railway stations on separate lines, linking the Great Northern Railway (GNR) and Midland Great Western Railway, then an end junction of the Belfast–Cavan route linking Clones with a branch line to Crossdoney and Killeshandra. With the Cavan–Dublin route, via Inny Junction, Longford and Mullingar on the Dublin–Sligo railway line. There is an old railway line running through Kingscourt on the border of County Meath; this line is now overgrown.

A branch of the Cavan and Leitrim Railway was also indirectly linked to Cavan town via Belturbet (the C&L terminus) and Ballyhaise on the GNR line. When the Government of Northern Ireland closed the section of the Belfast line from Portadown to Glaslough in 1957, it was found to be uneconomical to keep running the rump section from Monaghan to Cavan. All these lines (including the Cavan and Leitrim Railway) were closed by 1960. The (GNR) Virginia Road Station, from 1863 to 1958 serviced the Drogheda and Navan extension route to Kells and Oldcastle. Cooperation between the Cavan and Westmeath county councils is striving to integrate this into the national and regional development plan. Cavan railway station opened on 8 July 1856, closed for passenger services on 14 October 1957, and finally closed altogether on 1 January 1960.

=== Bus ===
Cavan Bus Station is owned and operated by Bus Éireann and is located on Farnham Street. The station is served by Expressway route 30 (Donegal Town to Busáras via Enniskillen and Dublin Airport). Other routes include route 65 (Galway to Cavan), 109X (Dublin to Cavan via Kells) 111A (Cavan to Delvin via Granard), 170 (Cavan to Dundalk), 175 (Cavan to Monaghan via Cootehill), 175A (Monaghan to Cavan via Clones), 465 (Carrigallen to Cavan) and 466 (Athlone to Cavan via Longford).

Leydons Coaches operate route 930 to Enniskillen via Belturbet, Ballyconnell, Bawnboy and Swanlinbar.

Whartons Travel operate a route to Longford railway station via Crossdoney, Arvagh, Drumlish and Longford.

There are also a number of TFI Local Link routes serving Cavan. These include routes C1 (Ballyhaise to Kilmore roundabout), C2 (Ballinagh to Cavan Hospital), C3 (Redhills to Farnham Estate), 176 (Cavan to Monaghan), and 929 (Corlough Devine's Cross to Cavan Institute).

== Education ==
Cavan town has four secondary level schools: Saint Patrick's College, Loreto College, Breifne College, and the oldest, Royal School Cavan, founded in the early 17th century.

Breifne College is a co-educational Vocational Education School administered by the County Cavan Education and Training Board.

Saint Patrick's College and Loreto College are respectively all boys and all girls Catholic voluntary schools, with The Royal School being a co-educational school with a Protestant ethos. These schools are administered by their respective patrons in conjunction with the Department of Education and Science.

The town has a third level college, Cavan Institute (formerly Cavan College of Further Studies), which was founded in 1985 and is the largest provider of FETAC courses in the northeast region. The college offers Further Education and Training Awards Council (FETAC) across its five schools; Business & Humanities, Healthcare, Sport & Education, Beauty Therapy & Hairdressing, Computing, Engineering & Science Design, Performing Arts & Services. Graduates are entitled to exemptions within most third level colleges and usually transfer to study a degree further completing their course by in their chosen field. The majority of students are Cavan locals, with a large proportion of its other students coming from nearby counties such as Leitrim, Roscommon, Monaghan, Meath and Westmeath. The college's main campus is located on Cathedral Road with other sites in the town centre and at the former Army Barracks on the Dublin Road.

== Tourism and events ==
=== All-Ireland Fleadh ===
In 2010, 2011 and 2012, Cavan Town hosted the Fleadh Cheoil na hÉireann. The 2010 Fleadh was held from 16 to 22 August. The Fleadh is the premier annual Irish traditional music, song and dance festival and series of competitions, which is run by Comhaltas Ceoltóirí Éireann (CCÉ). Fleadh 2010 was the 50th annual Fleadh Cheoil na hÉireann, and the first to be carbon neutral. That year it returned to Cavan for the first time since 1954. Up to 250,000 visitors attend the annual Fleadhann, and about 10,000 musicians compete. It is also estimated that the annual All-Ireland Fleadh generates €20-€25 million for the local economy of its host town.

== Twinning ==
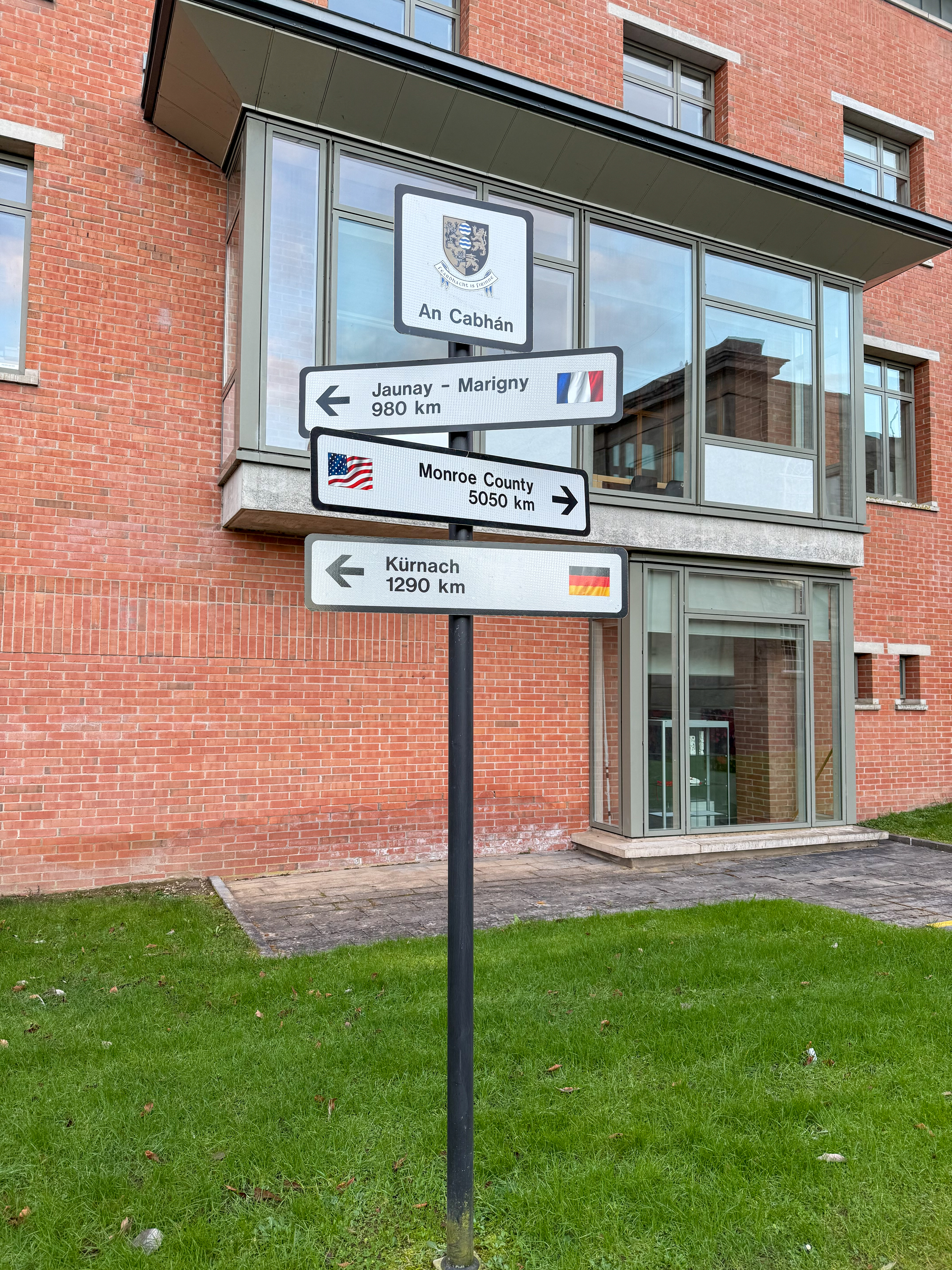
Cavan twinned cities sign

Cavan has been twinned with the following places:

- Jaunay-Clan, Vienne, France

== See also ==
- Category:People from Cavan (town)
- Cavan Orphanage fire
- Cavan Water Mill
- List of abbeys and priories in County Cavan
- List of closed railway stations in Ireland
- List of towns and villages in the Republic of Ireland
