= Board of Ecclesiastical Commissioners =

Board of Ecclesiastical Commissioners may refer to:

- Ecclesiastical Commissioners of England and Wales
- Ecclesiastical Commissioners of Ireland
