= Cavan Town Hall =

Municipal building in Cavan, County Cavan, Ireland

- Halla an Bhaile An Cabhán
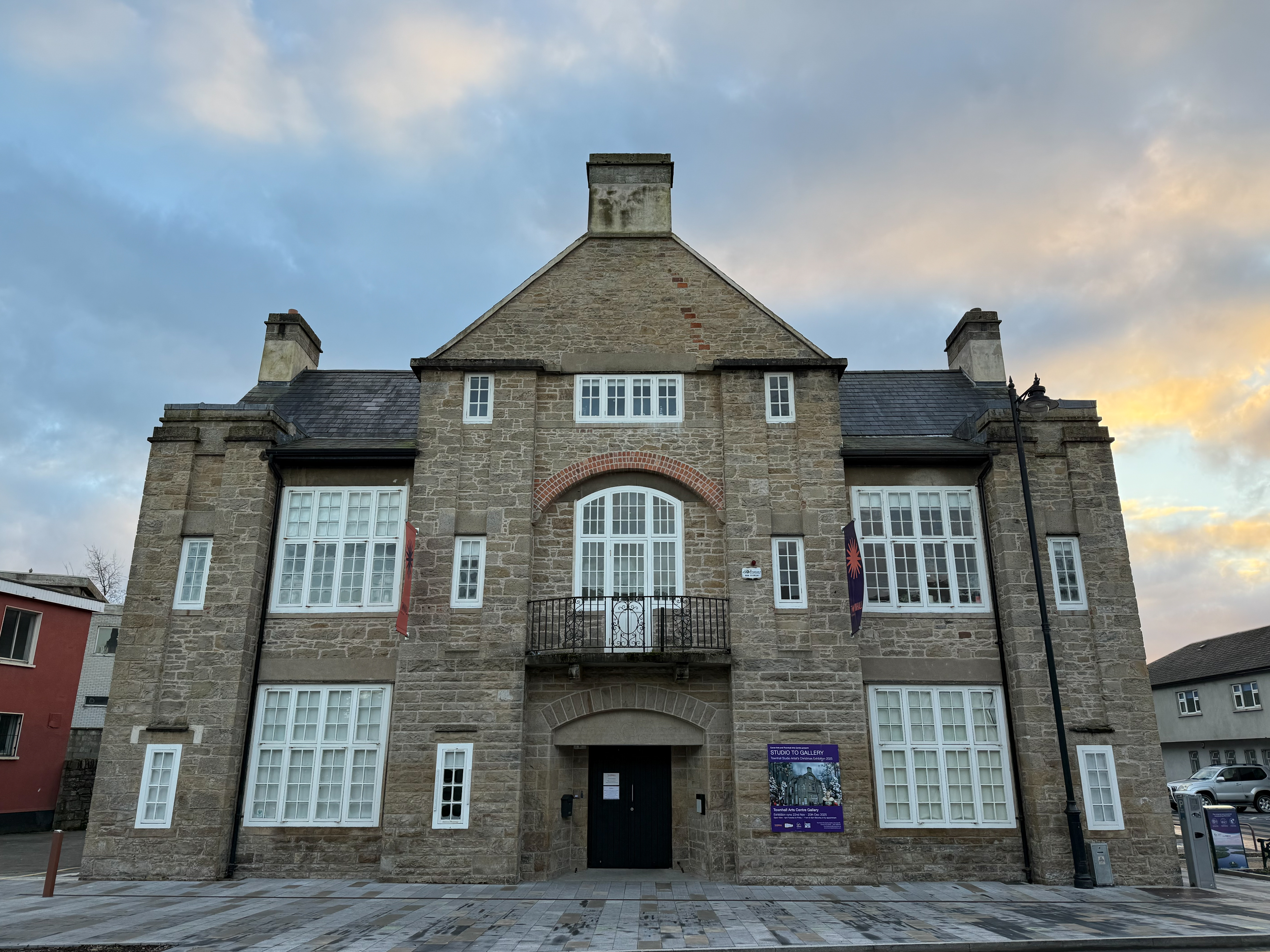
- Cavan Town Hall

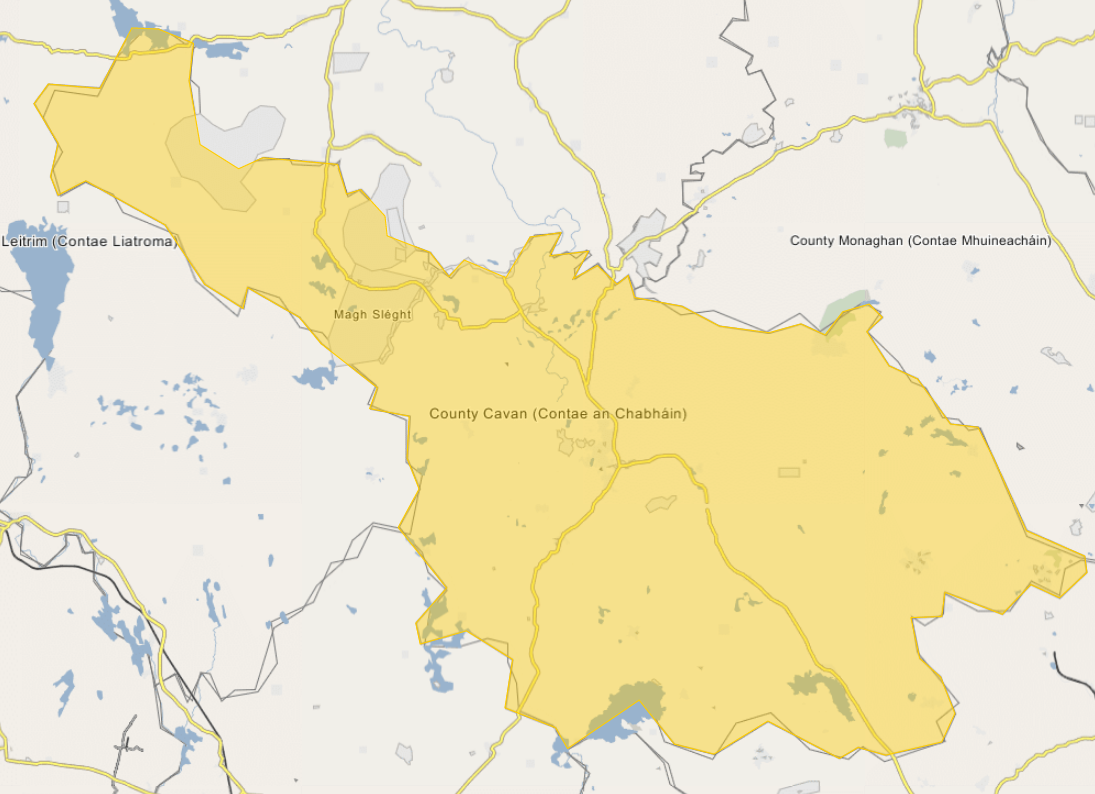
- Location within County Cavan

General information
- Architectural style: Arts and Crafts style
- Location: Town Hall Street, Cavan, Ireland
- Coordinates: 53.9911°N 7.3620°W
- Completed: 1910

Design and construction
- Architect: William Alphonsus Scott

Cavan Town Hall (Irish: Halla an Bhaile An Cabhán) is a municipal building in Town Hall Street, Cavan, County Cavan, Ireland. The building accommodated the offices of Cavan Town Council until 2014 but is now used as a local arts centre.

== History ==
The building was commissioned by Cavan Urban District Council in the early 20th century. The site they selected had been occupied by a 14th-century Franciscan Friary, known as St Mary's Abbey, and the land was donated to the council by the local lord of the manor, Arthur Maxwell, 11th Baron Farnham. The foundation stone was laid by Henrietta Smith, wife of the chairman of the council, Louis Patrick Frederick Smith, in November 1908. It was designed by William Alphonsus Scott in the Arts and Crafts style, and built by William O'Callaghan & Son at a cost of £2,688 using sandstone from a quarry at Latt, on the northern edge of Cavan Town, with the original slates coming from near Carrick-on-Suir in County Tipperary. It was officially opened by Henrietta Smith on 19 January 1910.

The design involved a symmetrical main frontage of seven bays facing onto Town Hall Street. The central section of three bays, which was slightly projected forward, featured a wide segmental headed opening on the ground floor, a segmental headed multi-pane French door fronted by a balcony and surmounted by an arch on the first floor, a four-partite multi-pane window on the second floor and a gable and chimney above. The outer bays of the central section contained narrow multi-pane windows on all three floors, with a cornice above, flanked by full-height pilasters. The wings contained large multi-pane windows on both floors in the inner bays, and narrow multi-pane windows on both floors flanked by full-height pilasters in the outer bays. Internally, the principal room was a large assembly hall.

The building was an important venue for public meetings. At the meeting of the Cavan Farmers' Union, in January 1922, the farmer and Fianna Fáil politician, Michael Sheridan, spoke out strongly against the Anglo-Irish Treaty, saying "we must break the last link with England". In March 1946, the Town Hall played host for the first time to the Cavan International Drama Festival, a competition which has continued to be held in March each year. A major programme of refurbishment works was undertaken under the direction of a local architect, Philip Cullivan, in the 1980s.

In 2014, the council was dissolved and administration of the town was amalgamated with Cavan County Council in accordance with the Local Government Reform Act 2014. The building was subsequently converted into a local arts centre by J. J. McCauley Construction at a cost of £1.75 million, with financial support from the Department of Culture, Heritage and the Gaeltacht and Cavan County Council. It was officially re-opened as the Townhall Cavan Arts Space in May 2022. Performers have included the folk band, The Fureys, in September 2022, the singer-songwriter, Lisa O'Neill in February 2023, and the rock band, Gina, Dale Haze and the Champions, in September 2023.
