= Cavan Water Mill =

10th century mill in Cavan

Coordinates: 53.98898°N 7.36158°W

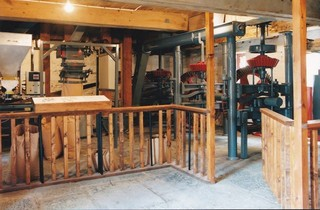
The power room at the mill

Cavan Water Mill, formerly Lifeforce Mill, is a 19th-century mill in Cavan in Ireland. The mill building dates from 1846 and contains a MacAdam water turbine. Having been abandoned in the 1960s, it was restored as a museum and visitor attraction in the 1990s. As of 2017, the museum was open at limited times and subject to advance booking.

== History ==
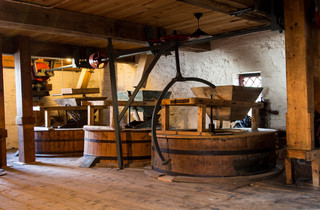
Room containing milling stones, which were used for grinding grains

Milling on this site can be traced back to the 14th century, when there was a Franciscan mill in the same location.

The current mill was established by the Greene family in 1846. During the 1840s, there were 90 working water mills in County Cavan, but at the time this mill was built it was the only one within a two-mile radius.

The building operated as a mill for more than a century until its closure in the 1960s. Following restoration, it operated again for a short while as a working mill for the creation of wholemeal flour for Lifeforce Foods.

== Design ==
The two-storey design has a three-bay extension at split level to the west and a two-storey return to the side. An adjacent mill building to the north was removed from its original site and rebuilt here in 1995 as part of the mill's restoration. Its entry in the National Inventory of Architectural Heritage describes it as the "only surviving example of five mills in Cavan town". It is included on the Record of Protected Structures maintained by Cavan County Council.

=== MacAdam turbine ===
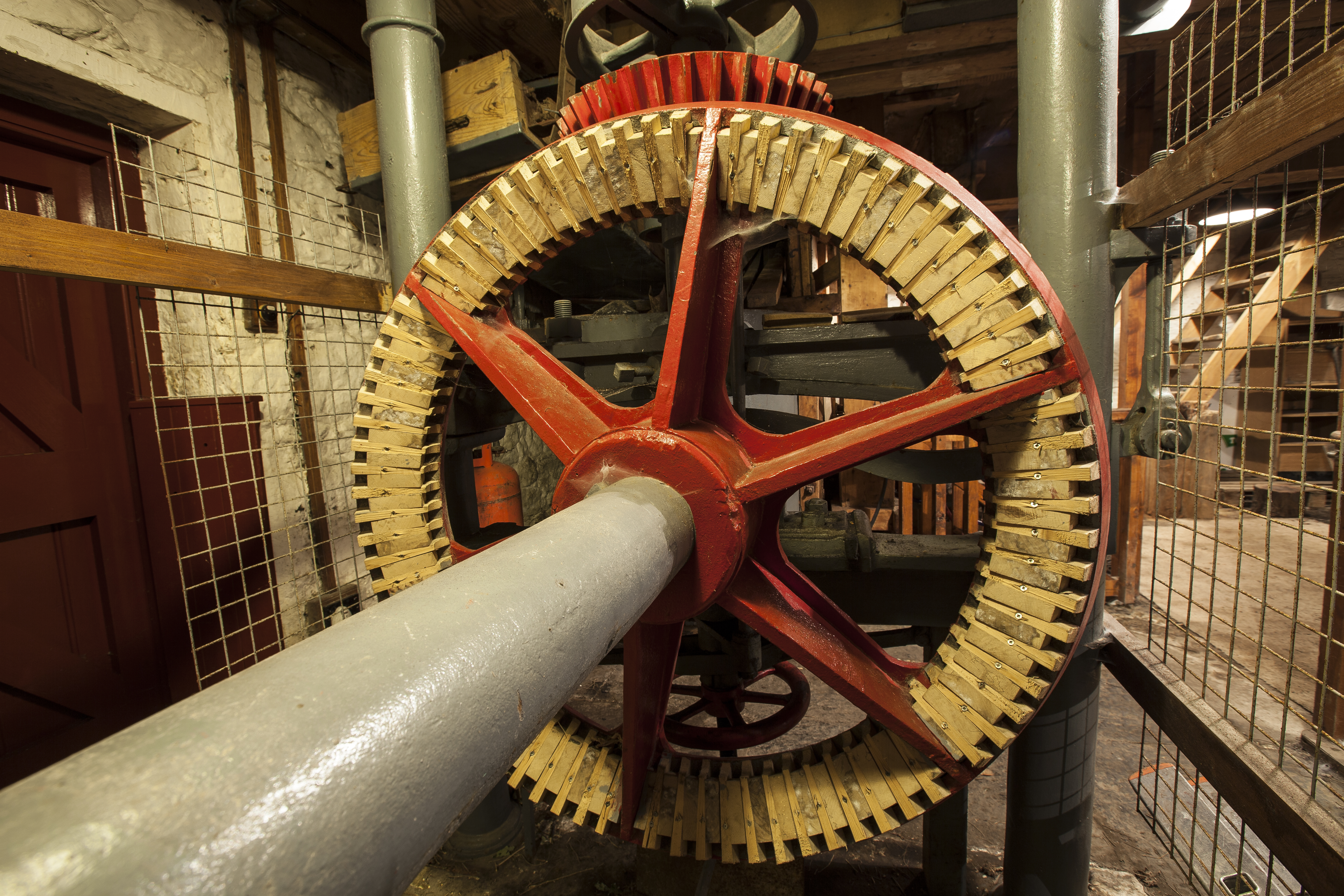
Cavan Water Mill cogs

Cavan Water Mill operates a MacAdam turbine as opposed to a conventional water wheel. The turbine was described, in 1993, as "one of the few, if not the only surviving MacAdam turbines in Ulster". The turbine may be an example of 19th-century industrial espionage, as it is believed to be a patent infringing copy of a design by Benoît Fourneyron. A similar turbine was installed at Ballincollig Royal Gunpowder Mills, Cork in 1853.
