= Battle of Cavan =

1690 battle

- Part of Williamite War in Ireland
Date	11 February 1690
Location	Cavan, County Cavan, Ireland
Result	Williamite victory

Belligerents
Williamites	Jacobites

Commanders and leaders
William Wolseley	Duke of Berwick; William Nugent (DOW)

Strength
1,500	1,000

Casualties and losses
880	800

The Battle of Cavan took place in Cavan, Ireland on 11 February 1690 between forces of Williamite and Jacobite troops during the Williamite War in Ireland. It ended in a victory for the Williamites who captured, sacked and burned the town of Cavan before withdrawing to their forwarding base at Belturbet and further afield Enniskillen.

The Williamite commander over Ennisskillen (Inniskillinger) cavalry troops was Colonel William Wolseley had been instructed by his overall commander Marshal Schomberg to observe and harry Cavan, as Jacobites were using it as a forwarding base to launch relief raids across Ulster for Jacobite forces. At the time Cavan was one of the few remaining settlements in Ulster still loyal to James II of Ireland. The Duke of Berwick led a reinforcement to the Jacobite garrison commanded by Brigadier John Wauchope.

Wolseley left Belturbet with a force of 1,200 infantry and 300 cavalry. He hoped to catch the Jacobites by surprise by using a roundabout route to cross the River Annalee via Bellanacargy but his expedition was spotted by a Jacobite outpost and word passed on to Cavan of its approach. Berwick decided to march out and confront Wolseley in the open, as Cavan town was unfortified without canon and indefensible seeking to minimize local casualties. Wolseley was unaware that Berwick had arrived to reinforce Cavan the previous day bringing the Jacobite strength up to 1,000.

Wolseley felt that he had to now launch an attack, as it would be dangerous to attempt a withdrawal fearing mutiny by his English conscript mercenaries promised land and silver to defeat the Jacobite rebellion. He ordered his men and cavalry forwards, but they were pushed back by a Jacobite cavalry charge. Wolseley then ordered his infantry to forward march, who received the Jacobite fire until they were close enough to fire a devastating volley due to their overwhelming numbers. The Jacobite infantry retrenched and regrouped for the safety of a nearby entrenched fort pending await of relief.

Wolseley's troops now surged into the town, looting and committing crimes against women and children, led by the Enniskillen troops, notorious for their cruelty against local populations. Seeing this some of the Jacobites sallied out of the fort and attacked them but were driven off by the Williamite forces, many of the plunderers rejoining the ranks to see off the threat. During the fighting the Jacobites lost Brigadier William Nugent, and their casualties have been estimated at around 550 compared to slightly higher Williamite losses.

Wolseley then burned the town and withdrew back to Belturbet. The defeat was a blow to Jacobite plans for the area and for its leadership in Ulster under general Patrick Sarsfield. Berwick returned to Dublin to claim his land and monetary rewards for suppression of rebellion in the region. In his report, Berwick inflated both the size and casualties of the Jacobite force.

The victory at Cavan began a successful year for the Williamites, and preceded the general Protestant victory to the east at the Battle of the Boyne that summer, leading to the capture of Dublin. Cavan subsequently fell to the Williamites.

== Bibliography ==
- Childs, John. The Williamite Wars in Ireland. Bloomsbury Publishing, 2007.
