= Soviet (council) =

Socialist workers' council

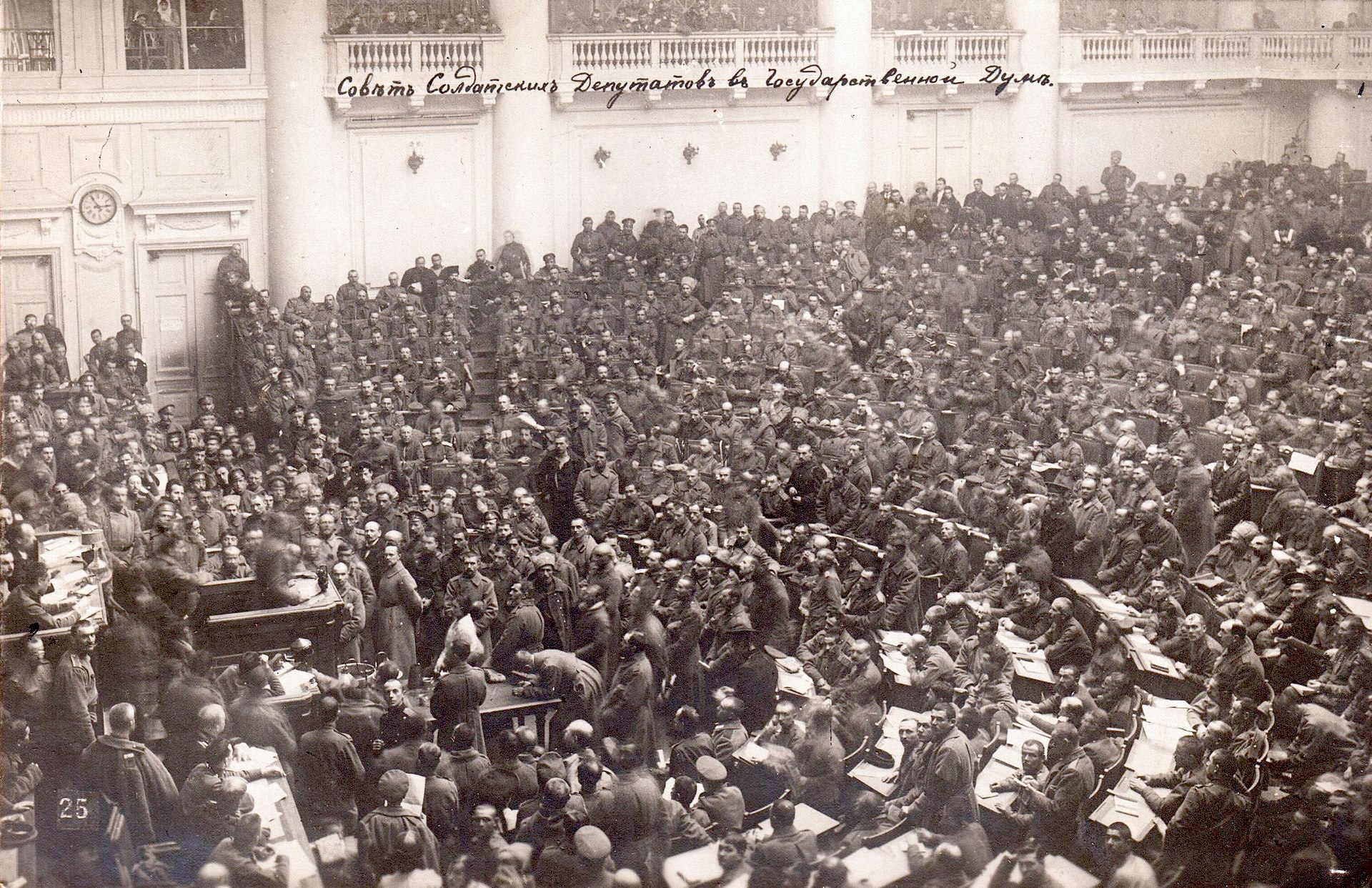
Soviet assembly in Petrograd, 1917

A soviet (Russian: совет, romanized: sovet, IPA: [sɐˈvʲet], lit. 'council') is a representative workers' council that follows a socialist ideology, particularly in the context of the Russian Revolution. In the expanded meaning of "workers', peasants' and soldiers' councils", and later "councils of deputies", the soviets acted as the foundation of the form of government of Russian SFSR and the Soviet Union, and influenced the Makhnovshchina.

The first soviets were established during the 1905 Revolution in the late Russian Empire. In 1917, following the February Revolution, there emerged a state of dual power between the Russian Provisional Government and the soviets. This ended later that year with the October Revolution, during which the Second Congress of Soviets proclaimed itself the supreme governing body of the country.

The governmental bodies on various levels were formally named "Soviets of People's Deputies", colloquially "soviets of deputies" or "sovdeps". For this reason Soviet Russia or the Soviet Union may be called by the derogatory term "Sovdepiya" (Russian: совдéпия).

Because soviets gave their name to the later Soviet Union, they are frequently associated with the state's establishment. However, the term may also refer to any workers' council that is socialist, such as the Irish soviets. Soviets elsewhere do not inherently need to adhere to the ideology of the Soviet Union.

== Etymology ==
"Soviet" is derived from a Russian word meaning council, assembly, advice, harmony, or concord, (Note: Ukrainian: рада (rada); Polish: rada; Belarusian: савет; Uzbek: совет; Kazakh: совет/кеңес; Georgian: საბჭო; Azerbaijani: совет; Lithuanian: taryba; Romanian: soviet (Moldovan Cyrillic: совет); Latvian: padome; Kyrgyz: совет; Tajik: шӯравӣ; Armenian: խորհուրդ / սովետ; Turkmen: совет; Estonian: nõukogu) and all ultimately deriving from the Proto-Slavic verbal stem of *vět-iti "to inform", related to the Slavic "věst" ("news"), English "wise", the root in "ad-vis-or" (which came to English through French), or the Dutch "weten" ('to know'; cf. "wetenschap" 'science').

The word "sovietnik" means "councillor", from the Russian word "soviet" plus the Russian suffix -ник denoting an occupation.

A number of organizations in Russian were called "council" (Russian: сове́т). For example, in Imperial Russia, the State Council, which functioned from 1810 to 1917, was referred to as a Council of Ministers.

The Polish and Ukrainian word is respectively rada and рада, 'council, advice', from Middle High German rāt. See Rada.

== Russian Empire ==
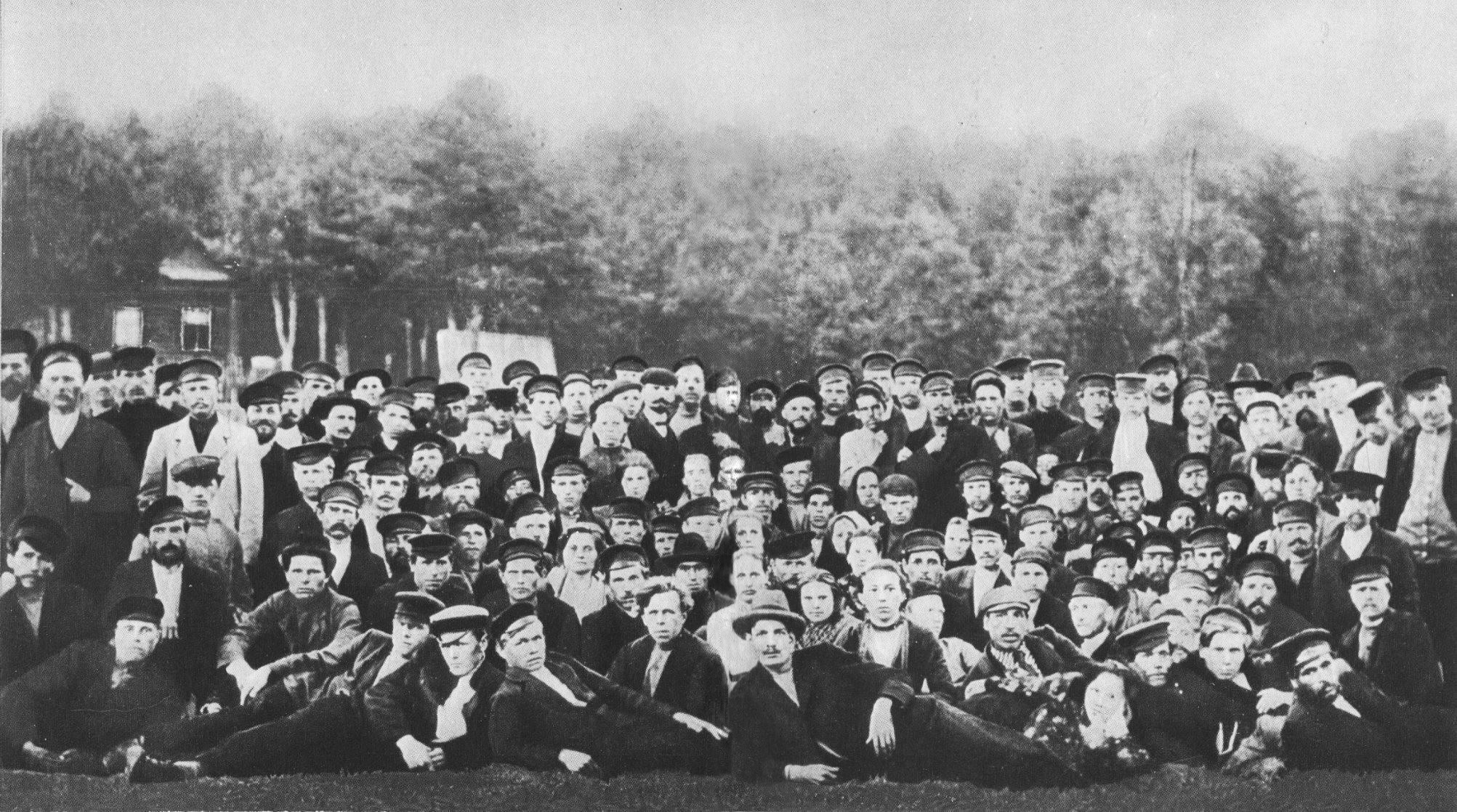
Deputies of the first soviet, 1905.

=== Workers' councils ===
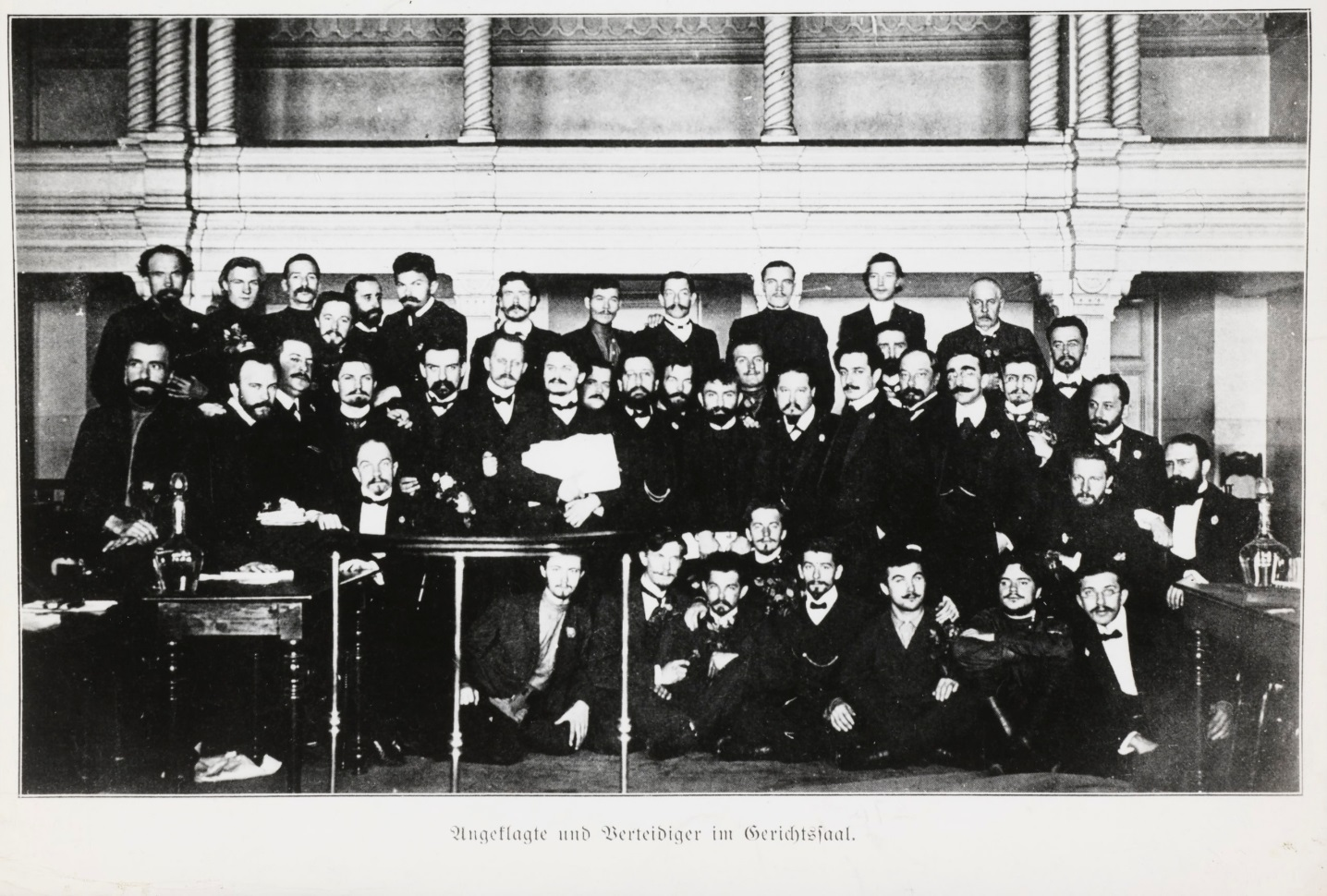
The Soviet of Workers' Deputies of St. Petersburg in 1905: Leon Trotsky in the center. The soviets were an early example of a workers council

According to the official historiography of the Soviet Union, the first workers' council (soviet) formed in May 1905 in Ivanovo (north-east of Moscow) during the 1905 Russian Revolution (Ivanovsky Soviet). However, in his memoirs, the Russian anarchist Volin claims that he witnessed the beginnings of the St Petersburg Soviet in January 1905. The Russian workers were largely organized at the turn of the 20th century, leading to a government-sponsored trade-union leadership.

In 1905, as the Russo-Japanese War (1904–1905) increased the strain on Russian industrial production, the workers began to strike and rebel. The soviets represented an autonomous workers' movement, one that broke free from the government's oversight of workers' unions and played a major role in the 1905 Russian Revolution. Soviets sprang up throughout the industrial centers of Russia, usually organizing meetings at the factory level. These soviets disappeared after the revolution of 1905, but re-emerged under socialist leadership during the revolutions of 1917.

Soviets emerged as inclusive bodies to lead workers, and to organize strikes and to politically and militarily fight the government of Russian Empire mainly through direct action, with the primary actors being socialist revolutionaries and anarchists, as Lenin's party was a minority. During this time they established minor worker cooperatives, though the operations were minor due to Russian crackdown on leftist organizations.

== Russian Revolution ==
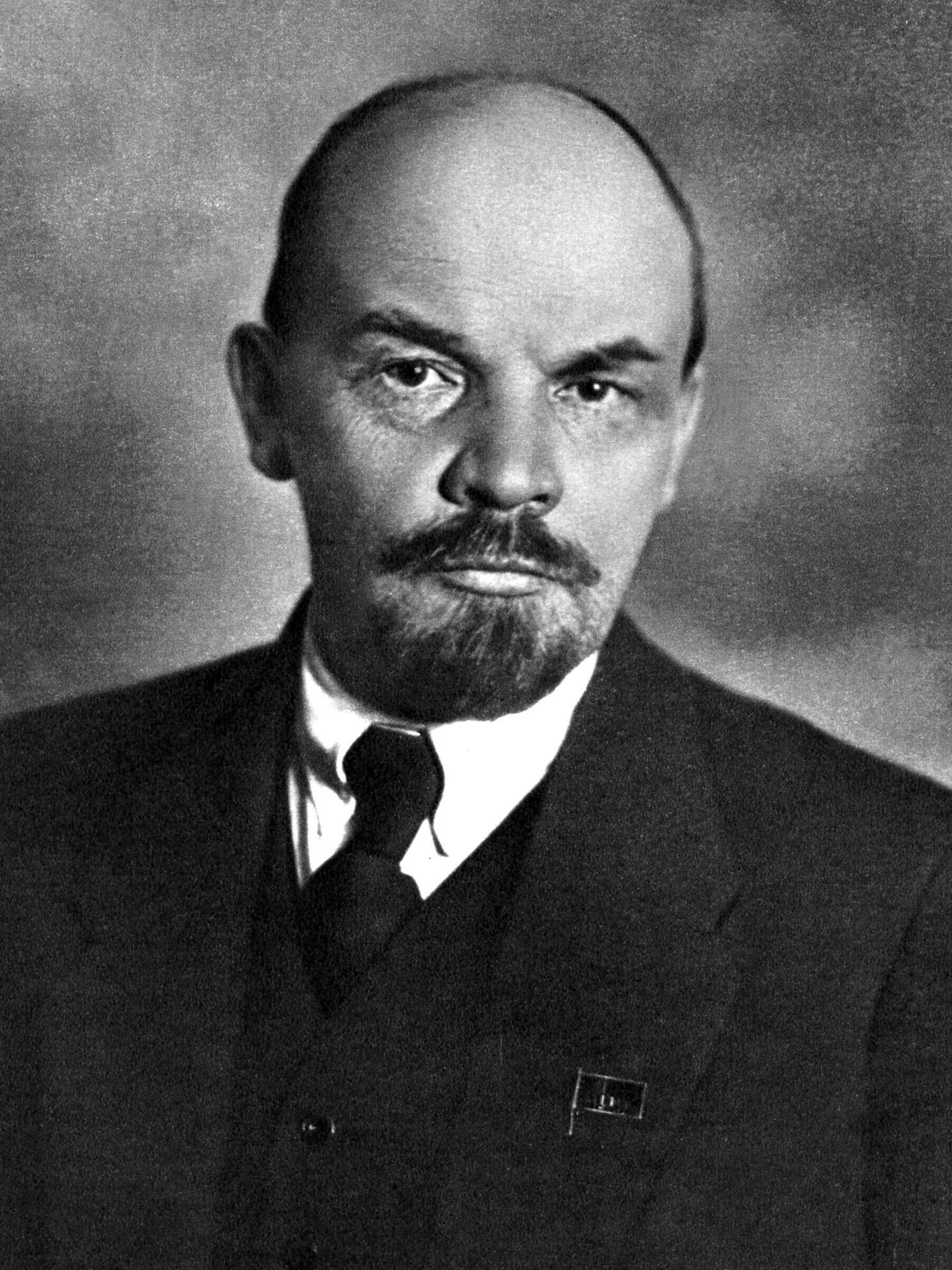
Vladimir Lenin, founder of the Soviet Union and the leader of the Bolshevik party.

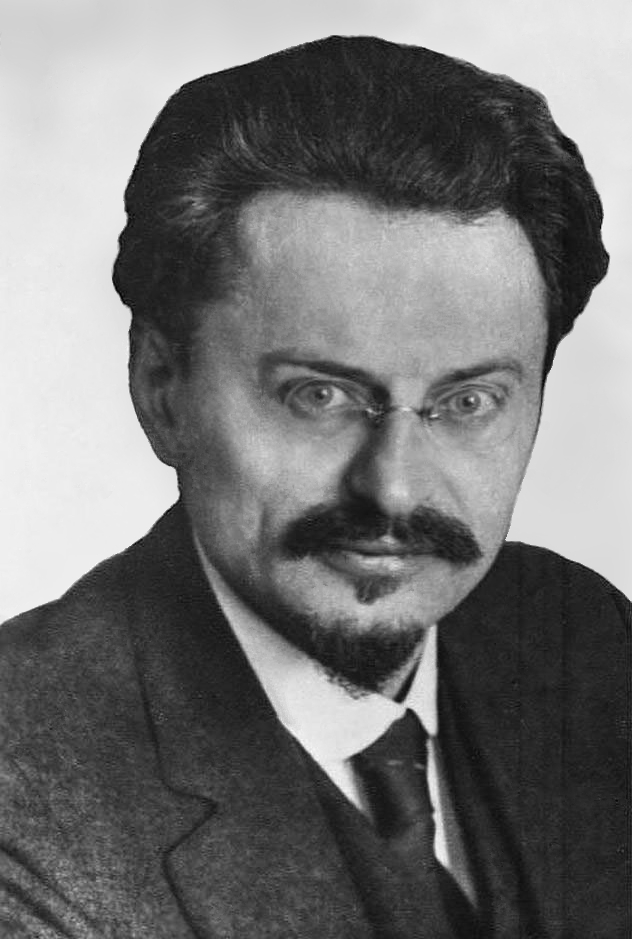
Leon Trotsky, founder of the Red Army and a key figure in the October Revolution.

The popular organizations which came into existence during the February Revolution were called "Councils of Workmen's and Soldiers' Deputies". These bodies were supposed to hold things together under the provisional government until the election of a constituent assembly could take place; in a sense, they were vigilance committees designed to guard against counter-revolution. The Petrograd Soviet of 4,000 members was the most important of these, on account of its position in the capital and its influence over the garrison.

At the beginning of the Revolution, these soviets were under control of the Socialist Revolutionary Party, and even the Mensheviks had a larger share of the elected representatives than the Bolsheviks. As World War I continued and the Russians met defeat after defeat, and the provisional government proved inadequate at establishing industrial peace, the Bolsheviks began to grow in support. By degrees, the Bolsheviks dominated with a leadership which demanded "all power to the soviets."

The Bolsheviks promised the workers a government run by workers' councils to overthrow the bourgeoisie's main government body - the provisional government. In October 1917, the provisional government was overthrown, giving all power to the Soviets. John Reed, an American eyewitness to the October Revolution, wrote, "Until February 1918 anybody could vote for delegates to the Soviets. Even had the bourgeoisie organised and demanded representation in the Soviets, they would have been given it. For example, during the regime of the Provisional Government there was bourgeois representation in the Petrograd Soviet – a delegate of the Union of Professional Men which comprised doctors, lawyers, teachers, etc."

In Petrograd, in November 1917, we also elected a Commune (Town Council) on the basis of the most democratic voting, without limitations for the bourgeoisie. These elections, being boycotted by the bourgeoisie parties, gave us a crushing majority. The democratically elected Council voluntarily submitted to the Petrograd Soviet... the Soviet Government placed no obstacle in the way of the bourgeois parties; and if the Cadets, the SRs and the Mensheviks, who had their press which was openly calling for the overthrow of the Soviet Government, boycotted the elections, it was only because at that time they still hoped soon to make an end of us with the help of armed force... If the Petrograd bourgeoisie had not boycotted the municipal elections, its representatives would have entered the Petrograd Council. They would have remained there up to the first Social Revolutionary and Cadet rising, after which ... they would probably have been arrested if they did not leave the Council in good time, as at a certain moment did the bourgeois members of the Paris Commune.

— Leon Trotsky, Terrorism and Communism (1920)

"The disenfranchisement of the bourgeoisie is not a necessary and indispensable feature of the dictatorship of the proletariat. And in Russia, the Bolsheviks, who long before October put forward the slogan of proletarian dictatorship, did not say anything in advance about disenfranchising the exploiters. This aspect of the dictatorship did not make its appearance 'according to the plan' of any particular party; it emerged of itself in the course of the struggle ... even when the Mensheviks (who compromised with the bourgeoisie) still ruled the soviets, the bourgeoisie cut themselves off from the soviets of their own accord, boycotted them, put themselves up in opposition to them and intrigued against them. The soviets arose without any constitution and existed without one for more than a year (from the spring of 1917 to the summer of 1918). The fury of the bourgeoisie against this independent and omnipotent (because it was all-embracing) organisation of the oppressed; the fight, the unscrupulous, self-seeking and sordid fight, the bourgeoisie waged against the soviets; and, lastly, the overt participation of the bourgeoisie (from the Cadets to the Right Socialist-Revolutionaries, from Pavel Milyukov to Alexander Kerensky) in the Kornilov mutiny – all this paved the way for the formal exclusion of the bourgeoisie from the Soviets.

— Vladimir Lenin, The Proletarian Revolution and the Renegade Kautsky (1918)

The Bolsheviks and their allies came out with a program called "soviet government". The soviet system was described as "a higher type of state" and "a higher form of democracy" which would "arouse the masses of the exploited toilers to the task of making new history". Furthermore, it offered "to the oppressed toiling masses the opportunity to participate actively in the free construction of a new society". According to Lenin, soviet rule "is nothing else than the organized form of the dictatorship of the proletariat". A code of rules governing elections to the soviets was framed in March 1918, but the following classes were disqualified to vote: "Those who employ others for profit; those who live on incomes not derived from their own work – interest on capital, industrial enterprises or landed property; private business men, agents, middlemen; monks and priests of all denominations; ex-employees of the old police services and members of the Romanov dynasty; lunatics and criminals."

With village and factory soviets as a base, there arose a vast pyramid of district, cantonal, county and regional soviets, each with its executive soviet. Over and above these stood the "All-Russian Soviet Congress", which appointed an "All-Russian Central Executive Committee" of not more than 200 members, which in turn chooses the "Soviet of People's Commissaries" – the Ministry. Beginning with a minimum of three and maximum of 50 members for smaller communities, the maximum for town soviets was fixed at 1,000 members. The soviet system was seen as an alternative to parliamentary systems for administering republican governments.

== Within the Soviet Union ==
As outlined in the Treaty on the Creation of the USSR and the Declaration of the Creation of the USSR, and successively the 1924 Constitution of the Soviet Union and 1936 Constitution of the Soviet Union, the Soviets were the basis of government in the USSR. Factory and village Soviets would send delegates to town Soviets, and in turn the town Soviet would send delegates to the regional Soviet, town and regional Soviets elected delegates to the provincial Soviet, provincial Soviets sent delegates to the Soviet of the constituent republic, and the Soviets of the Union Republics sent delegates to the Congress of Soviets of the U.S.S.R. As of 1936, the election of delegates up the pyramid became direct with the creation of the Supreme Soviets.

Elections of delegates were made by a show of hands in open factory and village meetings, or in meetings of the rank and file of the army. Any candidate was personally known to the electors, and his qualifications could be argued about immediately in front of his face. Delegates once elected were liable to 'recall' should they cease to represent the views of their electorate. Since this electorate was a real entity, always in existence and discussing politics from day to day, it had a live and changing public opinion. Thus the will of his 'constituency' could easily, unmistakably and effectively be brought home to the delegate; and it was equally easy for him to report back to his electors.

— Holme, "The Soviets and Ourselves: Two Commonwealths"

Local constituents within the factory and village soviet would compile a list of what they want the government to do, and the role of the elected delegates was to carry out the given tasks. Unsatisfactory delegates are liable to recall by majority decision of the electorate: in the 30s, fifteen delegates were so recalled within four years in Moscow alone. There were very few full time administrative workers or state functionaries; instead, many citizens would take part in the day-to-day running of the government. In the 1940s, it was estimated that at any given time there were over a million people participating in the running of the Soviets.

Each Soviet has a variety of committees, parallel to the government departments in the USSR as a whole- public employees aided, advised and ran their relevant committees- for example, teachers would be on education sections, and doctors on healthcare sections:

One major factor making the standing committees a more likely arena for deputy participation in the work of the soviet is their smaller size [...] in 1985 nearly 2 million deputies were members of one or another standing committee - about 80 percent of all deputies. In addition, deputies are assisted in their work by unpaid volunteers (aktiv) with a particular interest or expertise in the issues before the committee.

— Hahn, "Soviet Grassroots: Citizen Participation in Local Soviet Government"

The Union Republics, Provinces and Town Soviets had jurisdiction to run their own industry, take censuses, employ more doctors, teachers, and nurses, build schools, libraries and hospitals so long as it did not directly conflict with the national policy. More than half of the Union Republic's income went towards local grants, and local Soviets were largely allowed to determine how their budget was spent.

Based on the Bolshevik view of the state, the word soviet extended its meaning to any overarching body that obtained the authority of a group of soviets. In this sense, individual soviets became part of a federal structure - Communist government bodies at local level and republic level (Note: Earlier, in the Russian SFSR, there were three levels of soviet hierarchy: local, republic, and federal-republic.) were called "soviets", and at the top of the hierarchy, the Congress of Soviets became the nominal core of the Union government of the Union of Soviet Socialist Republics (USSR), officially formed in December 1922. Successive Soviet Constitutions recognised the leading role of the Communist Party in politics, - the 1936 Constitution deemed it the "leading nucleus of all organisations of workers, whether public or state". The soviets were structured as the instruments through which the Party governed the country. Thus the organs of the Communist Party (the highest being the Central Committee) made decisions on state policy, while the soviets acted as a system for public approval of implementing the Party's programme.

Later, in the USSR, local-government bodies were named soviet (sovyet: council) with an adjective indicating the administrative level, customarily abbreviated: gorsoviet (gorodskoy sovyet: city council), raysoviet/raisoviet' (rayonny sovyet: raion council), selsoviet (sel'sky sovyet: rural council), possoviet (poselkovy sovyet: settlement council). In practice deputies in a soviet often worked in standing committees and carried out functions with the help of unpaid volunteers (the aktiv - Russian: актив).

However, political pluralism disappeared very early. Under Bolshevik rule, rival political parties were suppressed or excluded, and political power became concentrated in the Communist Party. A Cambridge history of Lenin's government notes that Lenin himself came to describe the dictatorship of the proletariat as meaning, “in essence,” the dictatorship of the Communist Party.

Furthermore, the existence of elections and recall did not by itself make the soviets democratic in the ordinary competitive sense. By the Stalin period, elections normally did not offer voters a genuine choice among competing political programmes. This is particularly striking after the supposedly democratic 1936 Constitution. Historian J. Arch Getty notes that the first elections to the Supreme Soviet in 1937 permitted only uncontested candidates, while the constitutional civil liberties and democratic guarantees largely remained dead letters.

The leadership initially contemplated multicandidate elections under the 1936 Constitution, partly as a way of disciplining unpopular local officials. Those plans were abandoned in 1937. The intention was never to permit electoral competition that threatened Communist Party rule. Criticism of a factory manager or inefficient local official, for example, was not equivalent to challenging Communist Party rule. Indeed, the system sometimes deliberately encouraged criticism within prescribed ideological boundaries. But organized political opposition to the Party's monopoly on power was another matter. Under Stalin it could be extraordinarily dangerous, including expulsion, dismissal, arrest, imprisonment, exile or execution. Even much later, dissidents could face professional sanctions, surveillance, imprisonment or other forms of repression. One modern scholarly summary puts the development particularly succinctly: the soviets “soon became a rubber stamp of the Communist Party,” with the dictatorship of the proletariat becoming a dictatorship of the party and, under Stalin, of the leader.

Opposition was severely constrained. The 1936 Constitution of the Soviet Union formally guaranteed freedom of speech, press, assembly and demonstrations in Article 125, but explicitly framed those freedoms as being exercised “in conformity with the interests of the working people” and for strengthening the socialist system. Article 126 simultaneously defined the Communist Party as the “leading core” of organizations of the working people, including state organizations.

== Post-Communist Russia ==
Although English speakers perceive the term as connoting the defunct Soviet Union, the same word is used in Russian for the Federation Council of the post-communist Russian Federal Assembly. Its untranslated name is Сове́т Федера́ции (Sovyet Federatsii).

== Outside Russia ==
=== Poland ===
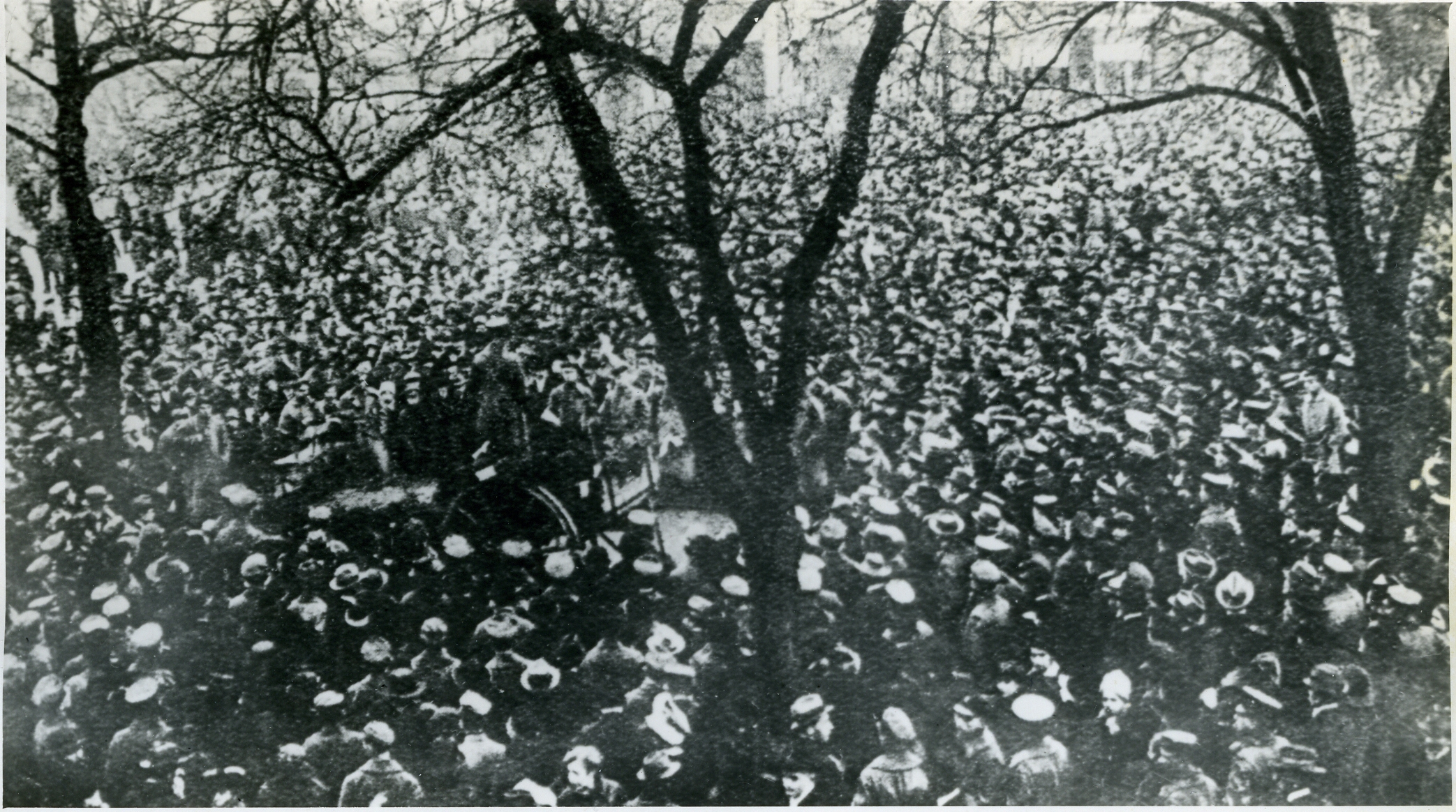
Polish soldiers and workers electing a council in Poznań, November 1918

Workers' councils, known as rady delegatów robotniczych (councils of workers' delegates) or simply rady robotnicze (workers' councils), were formed in Poland at various times throughout the 20th century. The first known examples occurred during the Revolution in the Kingdom of Poland (1905–1907), part of the 1905 Russian Revolution, wherein workers in Congress Poland took control of factories and sometimes even entire towns until tsarist authorities quelled the rebellion using police and military forces; alongside Central Russia and Latvia, Congress Poland was one of the most active centres of the 1905 of revolution.

In 1918, soviets began popping up all around Poland, which was regaining independence after 123 years of colonial rule. Over 100 workers' councils operated there in the years 1918–1919, assembling around 500,000 workers and peasants. The most numerous and radical councils were located in Kraśnik, Lublin, Płock, Warsaw, Zamość, and Zagłębie Dąbrowskie. Although some of the rady managed to form self-defence units, the councils were dismantled by July 1919 – mostly due to suppression by the Polish government and withdrawal of support from the reformist Polish Socialist Party.

The rady robotnicze also appeared in the aftermath of World War II 1944–1947, in the Polish People's Republic during the Poznań protests of 1956 and Polish October, in 1970, as well as the strike committees and councils of 1980–1981.

=== Germany ===
In the wake of World War I, the Social Democrats took power in Bavaria, setting up the People's State of Bavaria under the leadership of Kurt Eisner, a popular Jewish writer. Eisner, an eccentric and well known figure in Munich, succeeded in carrying out a bloodless coup with a few hundred men on 7 November 1918, occupying the seat of parliament and government, and proclaiming a republic. He was assassinated three months after, whereupon a short-lived soviet republic was established by the Bavarian workers.

On 1 May 1919, the German Army, along with local Bavarian Freikorps, overthrew the nascent republic, massacring several hundred persons in the process, including many non-Communist. A Social Democratic government was thereupon restored, however, political power passed to the Bavarian right.

The political turmoil of post-war Bavaria was also the political springboard of Hitler's political career. Hitler, having returned to Munich in late November 1918, detested the soviet state (he elaborated on his aversion to it in his autobiographical work, Mein Kampf, where he also claimed he once narrowly avoided arrest by the state). After the fall of the soviet administration in Bavaria, Hitler began his "first more or less political activity", informing a military commission regarding those involved in the short-lived soviet state. This work might have been what ensured his future employment with the Reichswehr in Munich as an "educational officer" whose task was combating "dangerous" ideas like communism, pacifism, and democracy among the army's ranks (many soldiers had taken part in the German Revolution; in fact it was sparked by mutinous German sailors).

=== China ===
After the Nanchang uprising, the term was also used by the Chinese Communists in the 1920s taking control in some parts of the country, which were later declared as the Chinese Soviet Republic in 1931. The CSR was China's first communist government in a structure that would later evolve into the People's Republic of China. The Chinese Soviet Republic was dissolved on 22 September 1937 when the Chinese Communist Party issued, in the Second United Front, its manifesto on unity with the Kuomintang.

In 1929, Deng Xiaoping led a short-lived soviet in Bama County.

=== Elsewhere ===
The term soon came to be used outside the former Russian Empire following 1917. The Limerick Soviet was formed in Ireland in 1919 at the beginning of the Irish War of Independence, and sprung up alongside a number of soviets in Ireland. In 1920, the Workers' Dreadnought published "A Constitution for British Soviets" in preparation for the launch of the Communist Party (British Section of the Third International). Here the focus was on "household" soviets "[i]n order that mothers and those who are organisers of the family life of the community may be adequately represented."

== See also ==
- Alsace Soviet Republic
- Arbeitsrat für Kunst
- Bavarian Soviet Republic
- Cellular democracy
- Council communism
- Federation Council (Russia), which translates as Сове́т Федера́ции (Soviet Federatsii)
- Free soviets
- German Revolution
- Irish soviets
- Jiangxi–Fujian Soviet
- Participatory democracy
- Soviet democracy
- Thing (assembly)
- Workers' control
- Workers' council

== Notes ==
- cleveland.com - Stalin put on trial, loses: Russian court rejects 'bloodthirsty cannibal' libel suit by grandson
