= St. Davnet's Hospital =

Psychiatric hospital in County Monaghan, Ireland

- Health Service Executive
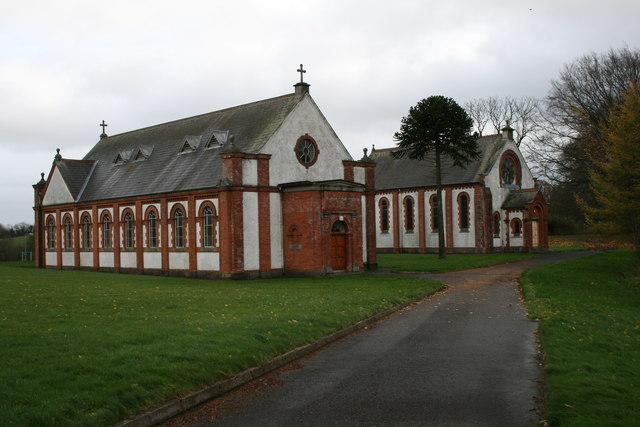
- Chapels at St. Davnet's Hospital

- Shown in Ireland

Geography
- Location: Monaghan, County Monaghan, Ireland
- Coordinates: 54.2510°N 6.9582°W

Organisation
- Care system: HSE
- Type: Specialist

Services
- Speciality: Psychiatric hospital

History
- Founded: 1869

Links
- Website: www.hse.ie/eng/services/list/1/lho/cavanmonaghan/mental-health-services/

St. Davnet's Hospital (Irish: Ospidéal Naomh Damhnait) is a psychiatric hospital in Monaghan, County Monaghan, Ireland.

== History ==
The hospital, which was designed by John McCurdy, was opened as the Cavan and Monaghan District Lunatic Asylum in 1869. Two chapels were built, one for Catholic patients and the other for Protestant patients, and these were renovated by William Alphonsus Scott in 1910.

The Irish republican, Peadar O'Donnell, was regarded as the first Irish person to use the term "occupation" in relation to the occupation of a workplace, when he and the staff of the hospital occupied the site in 1919. "The occupation was, in fact, the first action in Ireland to describe itself as a soviet, and the Red Flag was raised above the hospital." It became Monaghan Mental Hospital in the late 1920s and St. Davnet's Hospital in the 1950s.

After the introduction of deinstitutionalisation in the late 1980s the hospital went into a period of decline and activities became focused on Blackwater House.
