= William Nugent (soldier) =

17th-century Irish soldier (died 1690)

William Nugent (died 1690) was an Irish soldier of the seventeenth century.

An Irish Catholic, he was a Jacobite supporter of James II, who appointed him Lord Lieutenant of County Longford. He also served as a Brigadier in the Irish Army. He was fatally wounded during the Battle of Cavan, which took place on 11 February 1690 near the town of Cavan in southern Ulster between forces of Williamite and Jacobite troops during the Williamite War in Ireland. The battle ended in a victory for the Williamites, who captured, sacked and burned the town of Cavan.

== Bibliography ==
- Childs, John. The Williamite Wars in Ireland. Bloomsbury Publishing, 2007.
