= Cavan Courthouse =

Municipal building in County Cavan, Ireland

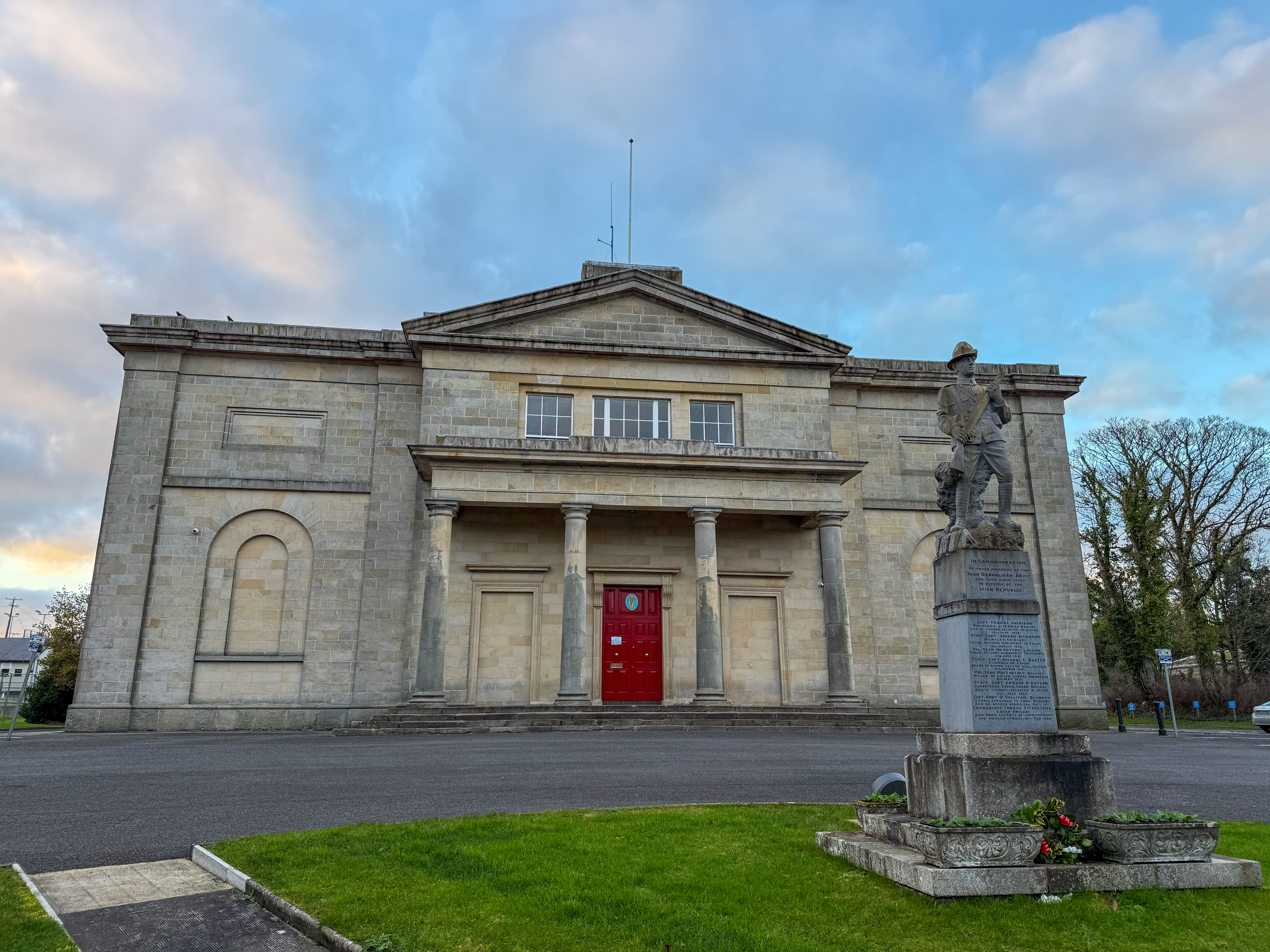
- Cavan Courthouse

- Location within Ireland

General information
- Architectural style: Neoclassical style
- Location: Cavan, County Cavan, Ireland
- Coordinates: 53.9935°N 7.3623°W
- Completed: 1824

Design and construction
- Architect: William Farrell

Cavan Courthouse (Irish: Teach Cúirte an Chabháin) is a judicial and municipal facility in Farnham Street, Cavan, County Cavan, Ireland.

== History ==
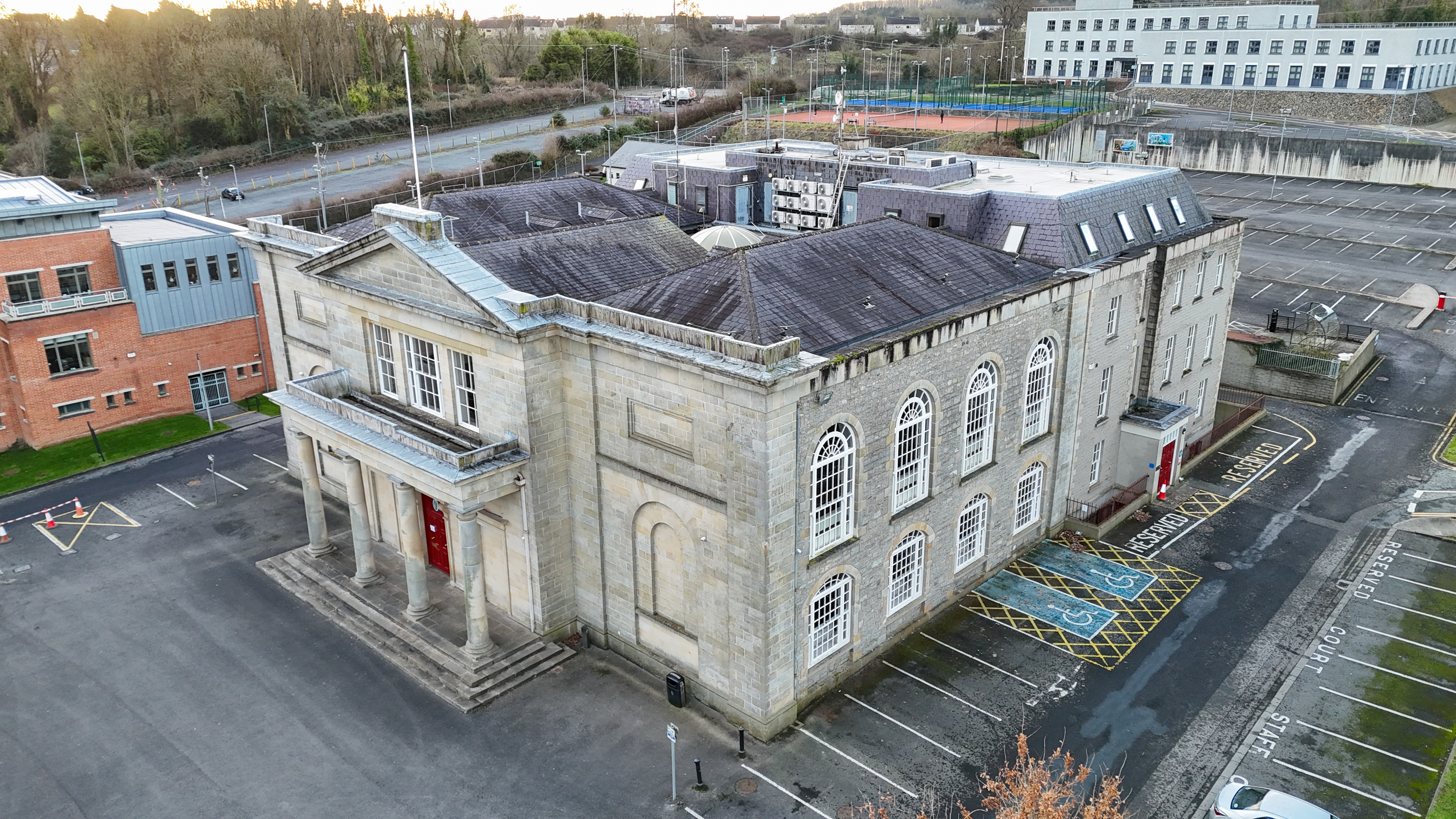
Aerial view of Cavan Courthouse

The building, which was designed by William Farrell in a neoclassical style and built in ashlar limestone, was completed in 1824.

The design involved a symmetrical main frontage with five bays facing onto Farnham Street; the central section of three bays, which slightly projected forward, featured a tetrastyle portico with Doric order columns supporting an entablature. There were three sash windows on the first floor and a pediment above. A memorial outside the building commemorates Thomas Ashe, a member of the Gaelic League, the Gaelic Athletic Association, the Irish Republican Brotherhood (IRB) and a founding member of the Irish Volunteers.

The building was originally used as a facility for dispensing justice but, following the implementation of the Local Government (Ireland) Act 1898, which established county councils in every county, it also became the meeting place for Cavan County Council.

== See also ==
- Carrick-on-Shannon Courthouse - also designed by William Farrell in a near identical style
