= Benoît Fourneyron =

French engineer (1802–1867)

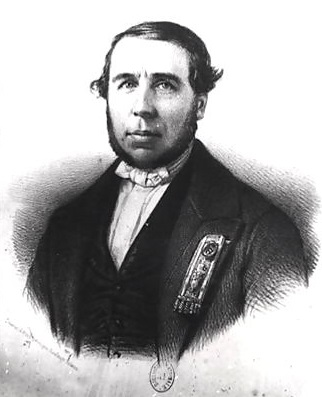
- Benoît Fourneyron
- Born: 31 October 1802; Saint-Étienne, Loire, France
- Died: 31 July 1867 (aged 64)
- Education: École Nationale Supérieure des Mines de Saint-Étienne
- Engineering career
- Projects: water turbine

Benoît Fourneyron (31 October 1802 – 31 July 1867) was a French engineer, born in Saint-Étienne, Loire. Fourneyron made significant contributions to the development of water turbines.

Benoît Fourneyron was educated at the École Nationale Supérieure des Mines de Saint-Étienne, a nearby engineering school that had recently opened. After he graduated in 1816, he spent the next few years in mines and ironworks. Around this time, a number of French engineers—including some of Fourneyron's former teachers—were starting to apply the mathematical techniques of modern science to the ancient mechanism called the waterwheel.

For centuries, waterwheels had been used to convert the energy of streams into mechanical power, mostly for milling grain. But the new machines of the Industrial Revolution required more power, and by the 1820s there was enormous interest in making waterwheels more efficient.

== Fourneyron-style turbines ==
Using the proposal of a former teacher (Claude Burdin) as a guide, Fourneyron built in 1827, at age of 25, his first prototype for a new type of waterwheel, called a "turbine". (The term turbine is derived from the Greek word "τύρβη" for "whirling" or a "vortex".) In Fourneyron's design, the wheel was horizontal, unlike the vertical wheels in traditional waterwheels. This 6 horsepower (4.5 kW) turbine used two sets of blades, curved in opposite directions, to get as much power as possible from the water's motion. Fourneyron won a 6,000 franc prize offered by the French Society for the Encouragement of Industry for the development of the first commercial hydraulic turbine.

Over the next decade, Fourneyron built bigger and better turbines, learning from his mistakes after each new model. By 1837, he had a 60 horsepower (45 kW) turbine capable of a fantastic 2,300 rotations per minute. On that model, the turbine's wheel was only one foot in diameter, and it weighed just 40 pounds. It operated at 80 percent efficiency.

Within a few years, hundreds of factories used Fourneyron-style turbines. Other countries adopted the design to power their industrial machinery, too. Immediately successful, it powered industry in continental Europe and the U.S., notably the New England textile industry. In 1895 Fourneyron turbines were installed on the U.S. side of Niagara Falls to generate electric power.

Fourneyron was elected a Foreign Honorary Member of the American Academy of Arts and Sciences in 1861.

== See also ==
- Water Turbine timeline
- Cavan Water Mill

== Bibliography ==
- "Fourneyron, Benoit". cartage.org. Archived from the original on March 21, 2005.
