= Claude Burdin =

French engineer (1788–1873)

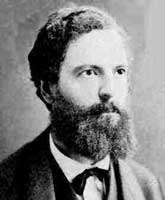
- Born: 19 March 1788; Lépin-le-Lac, Duchy of Savoy
- Died: 12 November 1873 (aged 85); Clermont-Ferrand, French Third Republic
- Citizenship: Duchy of Savoy, France
- Education: École Polytechnique, École nationale supérieure des mines de Paris
- Occupation: Engineer
- Known for: The promoter and creator of the first modern water turbine
- Awards: Knight of the Legion of Honour

Claude Burdin (French: [klod byr.dɛ̃]; 19 March 1788 – 12 November 1873) was a French engineer. Born in Lépin-le-Lac, Savoie, when it was known as the Duchy of Savoy, he was professor at the school of mines, École nationale supérieure des mines de Saint-Étienne, in Saint-Étienne. He became a French citizen on 4 June 1817. He proposed the concept and developed the term turbine from the Greek word τύρβη, meaning "whirling" or a "vortex".

== Biography ==
Burdin was born on 19 March 1788 in the Duchy of Savoy. He was part of the class 1807 of the École polytechnique and the École nationale supérieure des mines de Paris. He became a professor at the École nationale supérieure des mines de Saint-Étienne. Burdin spent most of his engineering career in Clermont-Ferrand.

In 1822, Burdin submitted his memo "Des turbines hydrauliques ou machines rotatoires à grande vitesse" (Hydraulic turbines or high-speed rotary machines) to the Académie royale des sciences in Paris. However, it was not until 1824 that a committee of the Académie (composed of Prony, Dupin, and Girard) reported favorably on Burdin's memo.

Working on water wheels, he was the promoter and creator of the first modern water turbine, an invention which was perfected by his pupil in Saint-Étienne, Benoît Fourneyron. This turbine - with a vertical axis - was installed in 1825, in a mill located in Pontgibaud; it had an energy efficiency of 67%.

He became a corresponding member of the Académie de Savoie on 4 July 1834 and of the Académie des sciences in 1842.

== Sources ==
- Bryan H. Bunch, Alexander Hellemans (2004). The history of science and technology : a browser's guide to the great discoveries, inventions, and the people who made them, from the dawn of time to today. Houghton Mifflin Harcourt. p. 325. ISBN 978-0-6182-2123-3.
