= William Alphonsus Scott =

Irish Roman Catholic architectural historian

- Born: 1871; Dublin
- Died: 1921 (aged 49–50); Dublin
- Other names: W.A. Scott
- Occupations: Architect, Academic
- Known for: Chair of Architecture at University College, Dublin
- Spouse: Kate Crumley (m. 1900)

William Alphonsus Scott (1871–1921) was an Irish Roman Catholic ecclesiastical architectural historian, academic, and was the most significant architect active throughout late 19th and early 20 century Ireland. His offices were first located in Drogheda, later located at 45 Mountjoy Square, Dublin.

== Career ==
Scott was apprenticed to Thomas Newenham Deane in the early 1890s. Deane was Superintendent of National Monuments. He worked in London from 1899 to 1902 and was there influenced by the Arts & Crafts movement. His ecclesiastical work, mostly for Catholic churches, was influenced by Early Irish Christian and Byzantine architecture. In 1911, he was appointed Chair of Architecture at University College, Dublin, succeeding the eminent Sir Thomas Drew. Much of his was completed by fellow academic Rudolf Maximilian Butler (1872–1943), then of 23 Kildare Street, Dublin.

Scott is also credited with the restoration and furniture design for Thoor Ballylee, the country residence of the poet William Butler Yeats.

== Personal life ==
Scott married Kate Crumley, daughter of Patrick, in Enniskillen on 4 September 1900.

== Works ==
- 1910 Repair and renovation on the Catholic and Protestant Chapels at St. Davnet's Hospital, Monaghan, Co. Monaghan.
- Talbots Inch Village, Kilkenny. Commissioned by Ellen Cuffe, Countess of Desart.
