= Ecclesiastical Commissioners of Ireland =

The Board of Ecclesiastical Commissioners was an agency of the Dublin Castle administration which oversaw the funding, building and repairs to churches and glebe houses of the Church of Ireland. It was established by the Church Temporalities Act 1833 (3 & 4 Will. 4. c. 37) to supersede the Board of First Fruits as part of a reform and rationalisation of the Church's structure. Under the Irish Church Act 1869 it was superseded by the Church Temporalities Commission, to prepare for the disestablishment of the Church of Ireland in 1871 and deal with subsequent changes in property ownership. Historic monuments were transferred in 1874 to the Board of Public Works. The Irish Church Act Amendment Act, 1881 dissolved the Church Temporalities Commission and transferred its remaining functions to by the Irish Land Commission.

== History ==
It was founded as a consequence of the Church Temporalities Act 1833 (3 & 4 Will. 4. c. 37).

The board consisted of 11 members, 6 episcopal members and 5 lay members, and they had to be members of the Church of Ireland.

The six episcopal members were appointed by his Majesty in council and four of them had to be Archbishops or Bishops of Ireland including the archbishops of Armagh and Dublin, where both could appoint a commissioner each. The five lay members included the Lord Chancellor of Ireland and the Lord Chief Justice to the Kings Bench, if they were members of the Church of Ireland, and three other laymen or clergymen.

In the beginning, the four provinces of the established church in Ireland were put under the responsibilities of the architects William Farrell (Armagh), Frederick Darley (Dublin), Joseph Welland (Tuam), and James Pain (Cashel). In 1843, the organization was centralized with Joseph Welland as the leading architect. After his death in 1860, the post was jointly assigned to his son William John Welland and William Gillespie.

The annual budget of the commission in the 1860s was about £180,000.

== Sources ==
- Church Temporalities Commission (1880). Report, 1869–80, with appendices. Command papers. Vol. C-2773. Dublin: Alexander Thom for HMSO.
