= William Farrell (architect) =

Irish architect

- Died: 1851
- Occupation: Architect
- Known for: building many Church of Ireland churches

William Farrell, RIAI, (died 1851) was a Dublin-based Irish architect active throughout early to mid-nineteenth century Ireland, during the Georgian and early Victorian period, known particularly for his church and institutional designs.

== Career ==
Succeeding John Bowden, Farrell was a Board of First Fruits architect for the Church of Ireland ecclesiastical Province of Armagh from 1823 to 1843 and as such designed a number of Church of Ireland churches for the Board of First Fruits and its successor (from 1839) the Board of Ecclesiastical Commissioners.

He was "a freeman of the City of Dublin as a member of the Guild of Carpenters at Michaelmas in 1816." He was president of the Aged and Infirm Carpenters' Asylum in 1842. He was a council member for the Royal Institute of the Architects of Ireland from 1842 to 1849, and vice president from 1849 until his death.

Differing views of his designs and success of his practice were raised. Farrell “was one of several architects to be attacked in the satirical poem, ‘An Essay on the Rise and Progress of Architectural Taste in Dublin…by Nicolson Numskull, Esq.’ which was published in 1832: ‘With rosy gills - round as a little barrel, A first fruits architect - see Billy F-rr-ll, Who thrives and fattens on anothers brains, He toils and labours - Billy counts the gains.’”

His sons joined his practice around 1833 or 1834 and his practice's name was changed in 1839 to "William Farrell & Son." Only one son remained in partnership and continued the practice after Farrell's death at the end of 1851, Francis James Farrell. Arthur Thomas Farrell, another son, attended Trinity College, Dublin in 1830.

== Influence on other architects ==
A number of prominent Irish architects received their early training in his offices. In the 1830s, it is thought that James Joseph McCarthy (1817–1882), architect of among other works the Roman Catholic St. Macartan’s Cathedral, Monaghan (1861–1892), apprenticed at Farrell’s office. Other apprentices included Sinclair Bates in 1809, John Louch in 1813, Parke Neville, and Sandham Symes.

== Works ==
- Kirwan House Female Orphanage Chapel, (1818-1970)
- St Patrick's Church of Ireland Church, Monaghan, (1836)
- Tyrone and Fermanagh Hospital, Omagh, County Tyrone.
- Cavan Courthouse
- Killeshandra Church of Ireland 1840
- Kilmore diocese See House, Cavan
- St. Paul's Church, Dublin, 1824
