= List of national monuments in Ulster =

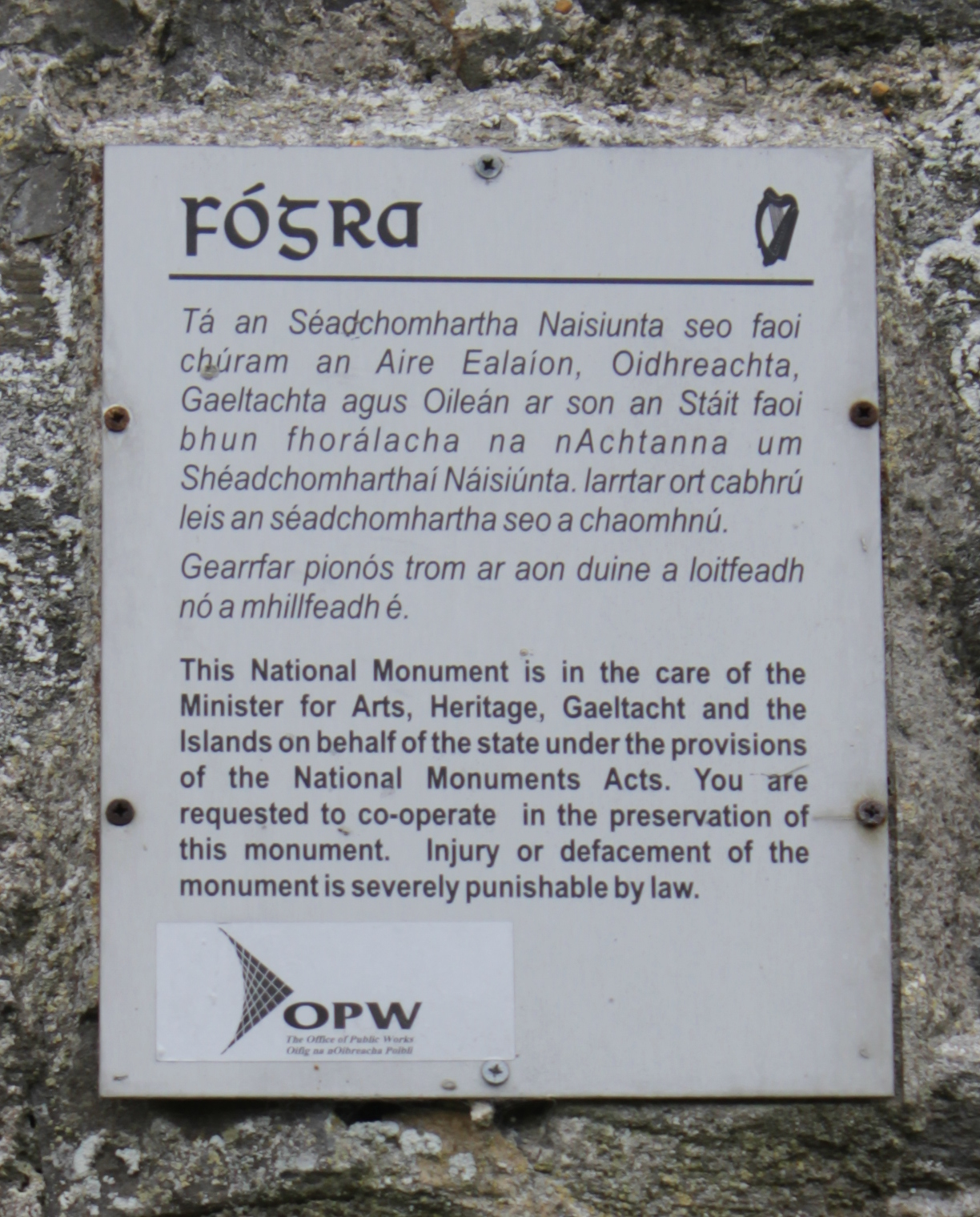
Photo of a typical Notice (Irish: Fógra) at a national monument in the Republic of Ireland. Only three of Ulster's nine counties lie within the Republic. The other six counties make up Northern Ireland.

The Irish state has officially approved the following list of national monuments of Ireland. In the Republic of Ireland, a structure or site may be deemed to be a "national monument", and therefore worthy of state protection, if it is of national importance. If the land adjoining the monument is essential to protect it, this land may also be protected.

Only national monuments in Counties Donegal, Cavan and Monaghan are under the protection of the Irish Government as the rest of Ulster is part of Northern Ireland. In Northern Ireland, such monuments are usually termed scheduled monuments and are under the protection of the Department for Communities, a department created by the Northern Ireland Executive in April 2016. Previously, such monuments were under the protection of the Northern Ireland Environment Agency (N.I.E.A.), which was part of the former Department of the Environment (the D.o.E.).

== National Monuments in Ulster ==
Cavan - Donegal - Monaghan

This list is initially sorted by county. If the list is sorted under another heading, the county links above will take you to the first item from the county in the sorted list

NM#	Monument name	Description	Image	Townland	County	Location
585	Cabragh Ringfort	Ringfort		Cabragh	54°03′14″N 7°06′32″W	
456	Cohaw	Court Tomb		Cohaw	54°03′27″N 7°01′05″W	
4	Drumlane	Church & Round Tower		Drumlane	54°03′29″N 7°28′43″W	
585	Errigal Ringfort	Ringfort		Errigal	54°03′57″N 7°06′12″W	
570	Gartnanoul	Court Tomb		Gartnanoul	54°00′37″N 7°29′32″W	
602	Cloughoughter Castle	Castle		Inishconnell	54°01′07″N 7°27′17″W	
616	Lisnagowan Ringfort	Ringfort		Lisnagowan	54°03′32″N 7°18′14″W	
139.01	Glencolumbkille Church	Church & Holy Well		Beefan	54°43′05″N 8°44′19″W	
140	Grianan of Aileach	Cashel		Carrowreagh, Speenogue, Toulett	55°01′26″N 7°25′40″W	
139.02	Glencolumbkille Cashel	Penitential Station		Cashel	54°42′39″N 8°43′29″W	
319	Doe Castle	Castle		Creeslough	55°08′06″N 7°51′52″W	
271	Carndonagh high cross	Cross		Churchland Quarter, Clonca	55°15′00″N 7°16′20″W	
25	Clonca Church & Cross	Church, High Cross & Grave Slab		Clonca	55°16′04″N 7°10′25″W	
174	Donegal Castle	Castle		Donegal	54°39′18″N 8°06′39″W	
175	Donegal Abbey	Friary (Franciscan)		Glebe	54°39′01″N 8°06′55″W	
658	Inishkeel Island	Early Medieval Ecclesiastical Site		Innishkeel Island	54°50′48″N 8°27′11″W	
139.03	Malin Beg (Glencolumbkille)	Church & Ringfort		Malin Beg	54°39′54″N 8°46′14″W	
139.04	Malin More (Glencolumbkille)	Megalithic Tombs		Malin More	54°40′57″N 8°43′15″W	
639	Newmills Corn and Flax Mills	Milling Complex		Milltown	54°55′45″N 7°48′31″W	
453	Pluck Standing Stone	Standing Stone		Pluck	54°56′23″N 7°38′11″W	
23	Ray Church	Church & Cross		Ray (Raymunterdoney)	55°08′51″N 8°04′14″W	
463	Beltany	Stone circle & standing stone		Raphoe	54°51′02″N 7°36′17″W	
24	Tory Island	Early Medieval Ecclesiastical Site		Tory Island	55°15′45″N 8°13′00″W	
435	O'Doherty's Keep	Castle		Tullyarvan	55°08′23″N 7°27′52″W	
111	Clones Round Tower	Round Tower		Crossmoyle	54°10′41″N 7°13′52″W	
112	Clones High Cross	High Cross		Crossmoyle	54°10′46″N 7°13′57″W	
111	Clones Church	Church		Crossmoyle	54°10′41″N 7°13′52″W	
382	Mannan Castle	Castle (Motte & Bailey)		Donaghmoyne	54°00′33″N 6°41′57″W	
208	Inishkeen Glebe Round Tower	Round Tower		Inishkeen Glebe	54°00′13″N 6°34′44″W	
564	Mullyash Kerbed Cairn	Kerbed cairn		Mullyash, Tavanaskea	54°10′27″N 6°40′10″W	
367	Cairnbaine	Court Tomb		Tiredigan	54°11′50″N 7°04′29″W	

== See also ==
- National Monument (Ireland)
