= List of national monuments in County Monaghan =

The Irish state has officially approved the following list of national monuments in County Monaghan. In the Republic of Ireland, a structure or site may be deemed to be a "national monument", and therefore worthy of state protection, if it is of national importance. If the land adjoining the monument is essential to protect it, this land may also be protected.

== National Monuments ==
NM#	Monument name	Description	Image	Townland	Location
111	Clones Round Tower	Round Tower		Crossmoyle	54°10′41″N 7°13′52″W
112	Clones High Cross	High Cross		Crossmoyle	54°10′46″N 7°13′57″W
111	Clones Church	Church		Crossmoyle	54°10′41″N 7°13′52″W
382	Mannan Castle	Castle (Motte & Bailey)		Donaghmoyne	54°00′33″N 6°41′57″W
208	Inishkeen Glebe Round Tower	Round Tower		Inishkeen Glebe	54°00′13″N 6°34′44″W
564	Mullyash Kerbed Cairn	Kerbed cairn		Mullyash, Tavanaskea	54°10′27″N 6°40′10″W
367	Cairnbaine	Court Tomb		Tiredigan	54°11′50″N 7°04′29″W

== Sources ==
- National Monuments in County Monaghan
