= List of national monuments in County Cavan =

The Irish state has officially approved the following list of national monuments in County Cavan. In the Republic of Ireland, a structure or site may be deemed to be a "national monument", and therefore worthy of state protection, if it is of national importance. If the land adjoining the monument is essential to protect it, this land may also be protected.

== National Monuments ==
NM#	Monument name	Description	Image	Townland	Location
585	Cabragh Ringfort	Ringfort		Cabragh	54°03′14″N 7°06′32″W
456	Cohaw	Court Tomb		Cohaw	54°03′27″N 7°01′05″W
4	Drumlane	Church & Round Tower		Drumlane	54°03′29″N 7°28′43″W
585	Errigal Ringfort	Ringfort		Errigal	54°03′57″N 7°06′12″W
570	Gartnanoul	Court Tomb		Gartnanoul	54°00′37″N 7°29′32″W
602	Cloughoughter Castle	Castle		Inishconnell	54°01′07″N 7°27′17″W
616	Lisnagowan Ringfort	Ringfort		Lisnagowan	54°03′32″N 7°18′14″W

== Sources ==
- National Monuments in County Cavan
