= Cabragh =

Cabragh may refer to the following places:

- Cabra Castle, a former castle and house and now hotel in County Cavan, Ireland
- Cabra, Dublin, Republic of Ireland; formerly spelt Cabragh
- Cabragh, County Down, a population centre in Northern Ireland
- Cabragh, County Tipperary, Republic of Ireland
- Cabragh (Killeeshil), a townland in County Tyrone, Northern Ireland
- Cabragh (Kilskeery), a townland in County Tyrone, Northern Ireland
- Threemilehouse, County Monaghan, Republic of Ireland; called "Cabragh" in the 2006 census.

Ancient sites:

- Cabragh Ringfort, County Cavan
- Cabragh Wedge Tomb, County Sligo
