= List of national monuments in County Donegal =

The Irish state has officially approved the following list of national monuments in County Donegal. In the Republic of Ireland, a structure or site may be deemed to be a "national monument", and therefore worthy of state protection, if it is of national importance. If the land adjoining the monument is essential to protect it, this land may also be protected.

== National Monuments ==
NM#	Monument name	Description	Image	Townland	Location
139.01	Glencolumbkille Church	Church & Holy Well		Beefan	54°43′05″N 8°44′19″W
140	Grianan of Aileach	Cashel		Carrowreagh, Speenogue, Toulett	55°01′26″N 7°25′40″W
139.02	Glencolumbkille Cashel	Penitential Station		Cashel	54°42′39″N 8°43′29″W
319	Doe Castle	Castle		Creeslough	55°08′06″N 7°51′52″W
271	Carndonagh high cross	Cross		Churchland Quarter, Clonca	55°15′00″N 7°16′20″W
25	Clonca Church & Cross	Church, High Cross & Grave Slab		Clonca	55°16′04″N 7°10′25″W
174	Donegal Castle	Castle		Donegal	54°39′18″N 8°06′39″W
175	Donegal Abbey	Friary (Franciscan)		Glebe	54°39′01″N 8°06′55″W
658	Inishkeel Island	Early Medieval Ecclesiastical Site		Innishkeel Island	54°50′48″N 8°27′11″W
139.03	Malin Beg	Church & Ringfort		Malin Beg	54°39′54″N 8°46′14″W
139.04	Malin More	Megalithic Tombs		Malin More	54°40′57″N 8°43′15″W
639	Newmills Corn and Flax Mills	Milling Complex		Milltown	54°55′45″N 7°48′31″W
453	Pluck Standing Stone	Standing Stone		Pluck	54°56′23″N 7°38′11″W
23	Ray Church	Church & Cross		Ray (Raymunterdoney)	55°08′51″N 8°04′14″W
463	Beltany	Stone circle & standing stone		Raphoe	54°51′02″N 7°36′17″W
24	Tory Island	Early Medieval Ecclesiastical Site		Tory Island	55°15′45″N 8°13′00″W
435	O'Doherty's Keep	Castle		Tullyarvan	55°08′23″N 7°27′52″W

== Sources ==
- National Monuments in County Donegal
