= Tullygallan =

Townland in County Donegal, Ireland

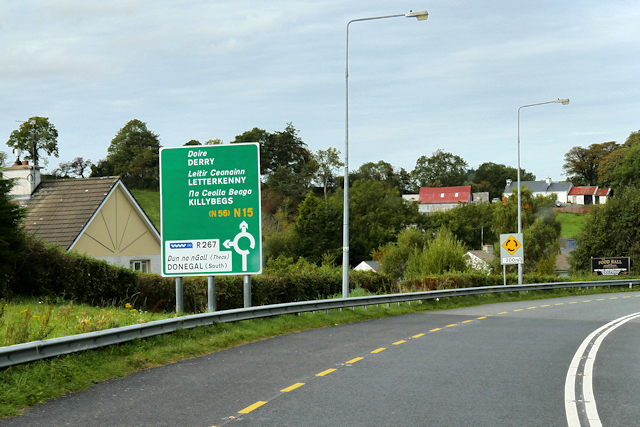
N15 road at Tullygallen

Tullygallan (from Irish Tulaigh Dhalláin, meaning 'hill of Dallán Forgaill') is a townland in the civil parish of Drumhome in the historical barony of Tirhugh in County Donegal, Ireland.

== Geography ==
Tullygallan is bounded on the north by Tullymorin townland, on the west by Rossmore, Rossyvolan, Tullyearl and Tullywee townlands and on the east by Raneany West and Tullyleague townlands. Its chief geographical features are the Laghy River, Tullygallan Hill, which reaches a height of 169 feet, woods, small streams and a spring well. Tullygallan is traversed by the national primary N15 road (Ireland), minor public roads and rural lanes. The townland covers 175 acres.

== Etymology ==
The original name of the townland was Tulaigh Dhalláin meaning 'The Hill of Dallán Forgaill'. Dallán was a friend of Saint Conall Cael of Inishkeel, further up the coast of Donegal, where he later died, so he may have rested in the townland on his way to visit Saint Conall. The earliest surviving mention of the name is from 1608 in "A booke of the Kings lands founde upon the last generall survey within the province of Ulster" found in the MS. Rawlinson A.237 (Analecta Hibernica, Vol. 3, 1931, page 163) where it states that the barony of Tyrhugh was divided into different precincts, one of which was called 'Tullygallane' which comprised one-quarter of a ballybetagh. There is a similar named townland in the mountain to the east of Tullygallan called 'Tullygallan, Tullywee, Oughtnadrin Barr', which probably formed part of the townland in 1608. Other early mentions are under St. Dallan's feast day of 29 January in the 'Martyrology of Donegal' published 1630 by Mícheál Ó Cléirigh (which states- Ata Tulaigh Dallain for it Tir Conaill, meaning 'There is also a Tulach Dalláin still in Tir-Conaill') and in John Colgan's 'Life of Saint Dallán' contained in his 1645 work entitled Acta Sanctorum Hiberniae, page 204, wherein he refers to different locations associated with Dallán, including 'Tulach Dalain and Tulach Dalani' in Raphoe diocese.

== History ==
Sites within the townland, as recorded in the Record of Monuments and Places, include:

1. A medieval earthen ringfort, this and the one below were probably the ones where Dallan stayed and after which the townland is named. The Archaeological Survey of County Donegal (1983) describes it as- Internal diam. 28.5m. A circular area enclosed by an earthen bank. The builders seem to have raised the E side of the site to compensate for the hill-slope. The bank is more substantial on the E side also. A gap to the NE may indicate the entrance. The site is located on the shoulder of a hill where it falls away steeply to the E.
2. A medieval earthen ringfort. The Archaeological Survey of County Donegal (1983) describes it as- Internal diam. 30m. A circular area enclosed by a partially worn earthen bank. There are indications of lazy bed cultivation in the interior which is now rush-covered. It is situated on the shoulder of a hill overlooking Donegal Bay close to another rath in poor land.
3. A lime-kiln
