= Pilib mac Séamus Mac Mathghamhna =

Irish cleric (died 1486)

Pilib mac Séamus Mac Mathghamhna was a canon chorister of Clogher, parson of Dartry and coarb of Clones Abbey.

He was a successor of St. Tigernach in Clones and had for the greater part all the Fourths of the bishop of Oriel and the farming of the priors of Lughbadh and Fermanagh, he was bound for the annates of the rectory in 1477, which was to be united to his canonry for the term of his life. He died on the feast of St. John, Apostle and Evangelist 27 December in 1486, when he is styled coarb, and son of the coarb Séamus mac Ruaidhri Mac Mathghamhna.

== Family ==
He was related to the Kings of Oriel. His grandfather, Ruaidhri mac Ardghail Mor Mac Mathghamhna, was the King of Oriel from 1442–1446. The Annals of the Four Masters mention his son's Niall who died on his way from Rome in 1484 and Séamus mac Pilib Mac Mathghamhna who became Bishop of Derry in 1502. Historians Peadar Livingstone, Robert Bell and Padraig Ó Gallachair all claim the McPhillips clan in Ulster are descendants of Pilib mac Séamus Mac Mathghamhna. The McArdle surname owes its origin to his great-grandfather Ardghail Mór.

Pilib mac Séamus Mac Mathghamhna Coarb
Regnal titles
| Preceded by Unknown | Coarb of Clones Abbey c. 1477 – 1486 | Succeeded by Séamus mac Ruaidhri Mac Mathghamhna |
