= Séamus mac Pilib Mac Mathghamhna =

Irish bishop, died 1519

- Bishop of Derry
- Church: Roman Catholic Church
- In office: 1503–1519
- Predecessor: Domhnall Ó Fallamhain (1485–1501)
- Successor: Ruaidhrí Ó Domhnaill (1520–1551)

Personal details
- Born: Clones, County Monaghan
- Died: 1519; Derry

Séamus mac Pilib Mac Mathghamhna (died 1519) was the Bishop of Derry.

He was appointed Bishop-designate of Clogher on 5 November 1494. John Edmund de Courcy was also Bishop of Clogher around this time and he did not renounce his claim to Clogher until 1502. Mac Mathghamhna then became Bishop of Derry from 26 November 1503 up until his death in 1519.

== Family ==
He was the son of the Coarb of Clones Abbey, Pilib mac Séamus Mac Mathghamhna and great-grandson of, Ruaidhri mac Ardghail Mor Mac Mathghamhna, who was King of Oriel from 1442 to 1446. His uncle, Niall mac Séamus Mac Mathghamhna (died 1488), was also appointed Bishop of Clogher before 14 June 1484, but the papal bulls were not expedited, John Edmund de Courcy went on to become Bishop instead. The Annals of the Four Masters mention his brother Niall who died on his way from Rome in 1484.
