= Dallán Forgaill =

Irish poet and saint

Saint Dallán Forgaill
- Born: c. 560; Magh Slécht, County Cavan, Ireland
- Died: c. 640; Inniskeel, County Donegal, Ireland
- Venerated in: Eastern Orthodox Church Catholic Church
- Feast: 29 January

Eochaid mac Colla (c. 560 – 640), better known as Saint Dallán or Dallán Forgaill (Old Irish: Dallán Forchella; Latin: Dallanus Forcellius; Primitive Irish: Dallagnas Worgēllas), was an early Christian Irish poet and saint known as the writer of the "Amra Coluim Chille" ("Elegy of Saint Columba") and, according to tradition, "Rop Tú Mo Baile" ("Be Thou My Vision").

== Personal history ==
Saint Dallan's given name was Eochaidh (Old Irish: Eochaid); his father was Colla, a descendant of the legendary High King Colla Uais, and his mother was Forgall (Old Irish: Forchella). His nickname, Dallán ("little blind one"), was earned after he lost his sight, reputedly as a result of studying intensively.

He was born in Maigen (now Ballyconnell), at the eastern edge of the territory of the Masraige of Magh Slécht in the north-west of modern County Cavan. He was not a member of the Masraige but belonged to a branch of the Airgíalla called the Fir Lurg, who were in the process of spreading southwards into modern-day County Fermanagh and County Cavan. (The Barony of Lurg in the north of County Fermanagh was named after them.) He was a first cousin of Saint Mogue. (The Life of Máedóc of Ferns says in ch. 72 that Dallán and Máedóc were sons of two brothers and he lived in Kildallan townland.) He was also a fourth cousin of Tigernach of Clones.

The Amhra Coluim Cille, a panegyric on Columba, written shortly after Columba's death in 597, is his best-known work and considered "one of the most important poems we have from the early medieval Gaelic world". It is reported that after completing the work, Dallan regained his sight. It was claimed that those who recited the praises of Columba from memory would receive the gift of a happy death, a custom that was widely abused by those who attempted to rely on their memory rather than a virtuous life. The "Amhra Coluim Cille" became a popular text for students in Irish monasteries.

The "Amra Senáin", a funeral oration in praise of Senán mac Geirrcinn (Senán of Iniscattery), was said to preserve from blindness those who recited it with devotion.

In c.640 Dallan was visiting his friend Saint Conall Cael at his monastery on Inishkeel when pirates raided the island monastery. Dallan was reportedly beheaded, and it is said that God reattached his head to his body after he was martyred. He was buried on Iniskeel; his friend Canall Cael was later laid to rest in the same grave.

He was acclaimed a saint in the early 11th century, during the reign of the High King of Ireland Máel Sechnaill mac Domnaill but was already listed as a saint in the earlier 9th century martyrologies compiled by Óengus of Tallaght. A medieval poem entitled "On the breaking up of a School" composed by Tadhg Og O Huiginn, c.1400, refers to the death of Dallán which caused his school to break up and the students to disperse as they would accept no other master. In a list of ancient Irish authors contained in the Book of Ballymote, Dallán is called "grandson of testimony".

== Works ==
Saint Dallan was a poet, Chief Ollam of Ireland, as well as a scholar of Latin scriptural learning. He helped to reform the Bardic Order at the Convention of Drumceat.

In addition to "Amra Choluim Chille" and "Amra Senáin", the following works are attributed to Dallán, although some may be later works by other poets who credited Dallan with authorship in order to make their poems more famous.

1. Amra Conall Coel – in praise of St. Conall Coel, abbot of Inishkeel

2. Dubgilla dub-airm n-aisse

3. Fo réir Coluim cén ad-fías

4. Conn cet cathach a righi (This is the final poem in the tale "Aírne Fíngein")

5. Rop tú mo baile (English: Be Thou my Vision)

6. Comaillfithir d'Éirinn ídail dar a hora

== Churches ==
Although he was not a priest, Dallán founded several churches throughout Ireland, such as Kildallan in County Cavan, Disert, Tullyhunco in County Cavan, Kildallan, Westmeath, Burnchurch in County Kilkenny, Killallon in County Meath, Clonallan in County Down and Tullygallan in County Donegal. He probably did this out of his friendship with the clergy and perhaps to ensure Masses for his soul. Because of this, he was known as Forgaill Cille in medieval texts, meaning 'Forgaill of the Churches'.

Preceded by Dubhthach moccu Lughair	Chief Ollam of Ireland c.590-640	Succeeded by Senchán Torpéist
