= River Gweebarra =

River in north County Donegal, Ireland

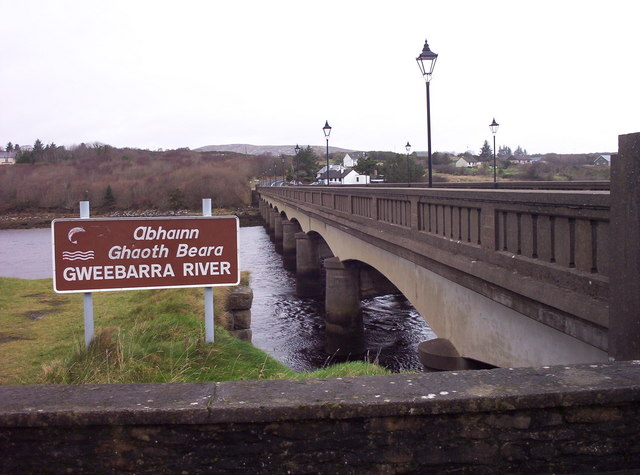
- Gweebarra Bridge near Lettermacaward
- Etymology: Beara's river
- Native name: Abhainn Ghaoth Beara (Irish)

Location
- Country: Ireland

Physical characteristics
- Source
  - location: Lough Barra, County Donegal
- Mouth
  - location: Gweebarra Bay
  - coordinates: 54°51′06″N 8°23′26″W
- Length: 31.78 km (19.75 mi)

Basin features
- Tributaries
  - left: River Cloghernagore

The River Gweebarra (Irish: Abhainn Ghaoth Beara, meaning 'inlet of the water river') is a river in north County Donegal, Ireland.

== Course ==
Several 'burns' enter Lough Barra from Crockfadda and Moylenanav. From there the River Gweebarra flows southwestwards between the Derryveagh Mountains and Glendowan Mountains, crossing the R252 at Doocharry. From here it widens, being bridged by the N56 south of Lettermacaward. It enters the Gweebarra Bay which flows on into the North Atlantic Ocean.

== Wildlife ==
The River Gweebarra is a brown trout and salmon fishery. Other species include Sand goby, European flounder, European eel, plaice, Fifteen-spined stickleback, Five-bearded rockling, Lesser sandeel, Two-spotted goby, Greater pipefish, Long-spined sea scorpion, Three-spined stickleback, turbot and pollack.

== See also ==
- Rivers of Ireland
