= Amra Choluim Chille =

Hagiography on Colmcille

Amra Choluim Chille or Amra Coluimb Chille is an Old Irish panegyric (amrae, lit. 'wonder'; [ˈaβ̃ɾe]) relating to Colmcille.

According to the traditional account the Amra Coluim Chille was composed about the year 575 by Dallán Forgaill, the Chief Ollam of Ireland of that time, in gratitude for the services of Columba in saving the bards from expulsion at the great assembly of Druim Cetta in that year.

"The Amra is not", says Whitley Stokes, "as Professor Atkinson supposed, a fragment which indicates great antiquity." John Strachan, however, on linguistic grounds, assigns it in its present form to about the year 800 (Rev. Celt., XVII, 14).

Stokes, too, seems to favour this view (ibid., XX, 16). But Strachan adds "perhaps something more may be learned from a prolonged study of this and other such as the Amra Senain and the Amra Conroi." Dallan was the author of the former, "held in great repute", says John Colgan, "on account of its gracefulness", and also of another Amra on St. Conall Cael of Inishkeel in Donegal, with whom he was buried in one grave.

== Editions ==
The Amra Coluim Chille was printed with a translation by John O'Beirne Crowe in 1871 from the imperfect text in the Lebor na hUidre; also in his edition of the "Liber Hymnorum" by Robert Atkinson, and in his "Goidelica" by Whitley Stokes, from an imperfect text in Trinity College, Dublin.

The Bodleian text (Rawlinson B. 502) was edited, with a translation, for the first time (Rev. Celt., vols. XX-XXI) by Stokes.

The standard modern edition of the Amra is the 2019 work by Jacopo Bisagni.
