= Cabragh Wedge Tomb =

Gallery grave in County Sligo, Ireland

Cabragh (I) Wedge Tomb
- Tuama Dinge na Cabraí (Irish)
- Giant's Grave
- Location within Ireland
- 54.174167°N 8.673889°W
- Type: wedge-shaped gallery grave
- Location: Cabragh, Coolaney, County Sligo, Ireland

History
- Built: c. 2250 BC

Site notes
- Elevation: 174 m (571 ft)

National monument of Ireland
- Official name: Cabragh Wedge Tomb
- Reference no.: 523

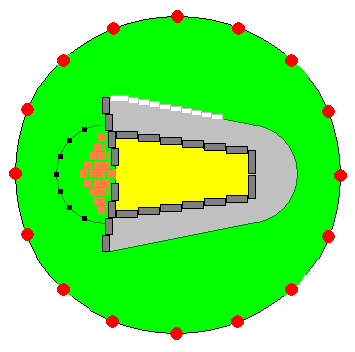
Wedge tomb

The Cabragh Wedge Tomb, also called Cabragh I or the Giant's Grave, is a wedge-shaped gallery grave and National Monument located in County Sligo, Ireland.

== Location ==
Cabragh Wedge Tomb is located 4.7 km (2.9 mi) west of Coolaney in the foothills of the Ox Mountains. A tributary of the Owenbeg River flows to the west.

== History ==
This wedge tomb was built c. 2500–2000 BC, in the Copper or Bronze Age. The entrance faces southwest, towards the setting sun at the winter solstice.

== Description ==
The tomb is 12 m (39 ft) long with double outer walling and entrance stones. There are two burial chambers 2.5 m (8 ft 2 in) and 4 m (13 ft) long, with the roof stones collapsed inward.
