= Tigernach of Clones =

Irish saint

Tigernach
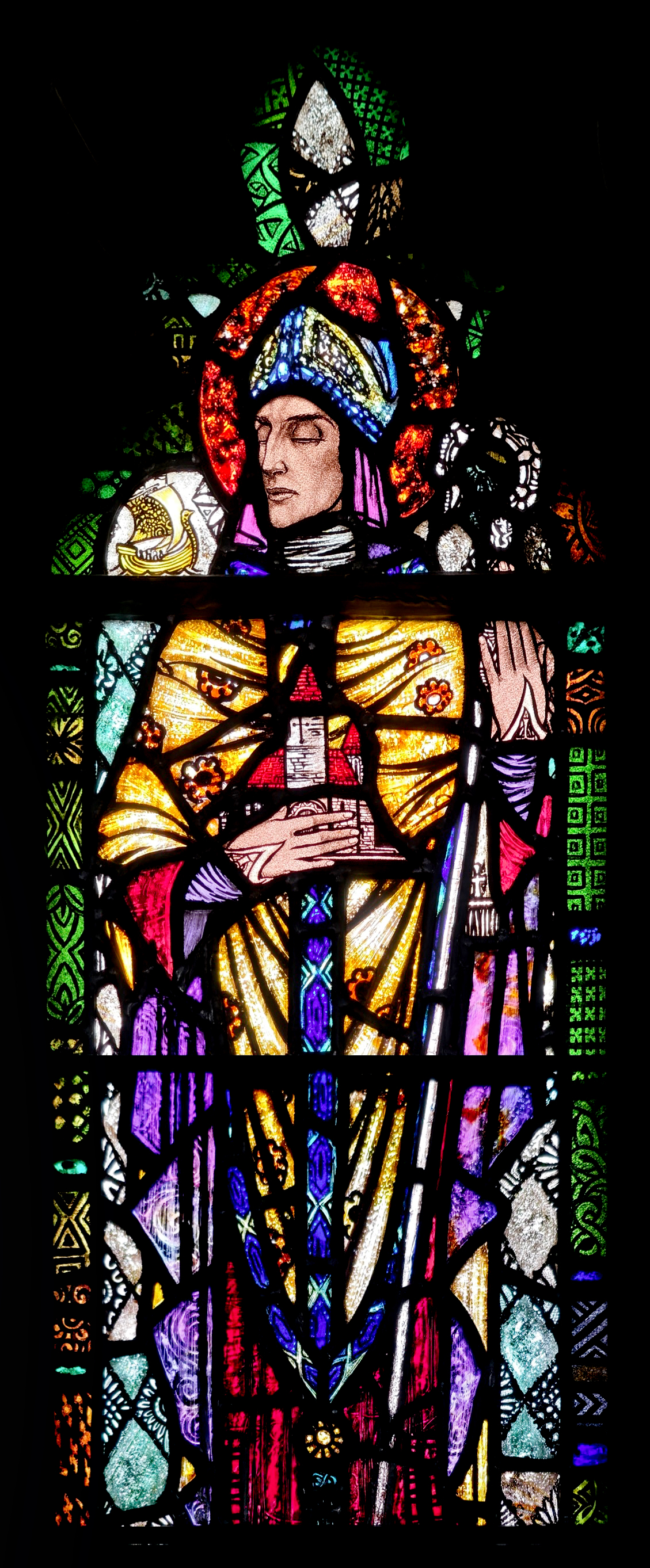
- St. Tigernach by Harry Clarke at St. Joseph's Carrickmacross

Coarb of Clones Abbey
- Died: 549; Clones, County Monaghan
- Venerated in: Roman Catholic Church
- Feast: 4 April

Tigernach mac Coirpri (d. 549) was an early Irish saint, patron saint of Clones (County Monaghan) in the province of Ulster.

== Background ==
Tigernach or Tiarnach of Clones (anglicised Tierney) was one of the pre-eminent saints of the territory ruled by the Uí Chremthainn dynasty, together with Mac Caírthinn of Clogher and Mo Laisse of Devenish. His principal foundation is Clones, which lay in the western part of Fernmag, a kingdom ruled by the Uí Chremthainn branch Uí Nad Sluaig. The first foundation by Tigernach, in about the same area, is Gabáil-liúin, now Galloon Island, Upper Lough Erne (County Fermanagh), on the border of that kingdom.

== Life ==
Tigernach's Life depicts an early stage when the Uí Chremthainn had not yet branched off but had a single royal seat near Clogher. Tigernach was born out of an illicit union between a king's daughter and an alien warrior: his mother, Der Fraích, was a daughter of Eochaid, king of the Uí Chremthainn, while his father, Coirpre, was a Leinsterman in Eochaid's service, the Irish genealogies specifying that Coirpre belonged to the Uí Briúin branch of the Uí Bairrche. Soon after his birth, he was brought to Leinster. Brigit of Kildare named the child Tigernach, meaning "princely". According to Butler, Tigernach was baptized by Conleth, bishop of Kildare with Brigid as godmother. Tigernach's maternal uncle was Cairpre Daim Argat, King of Airgíalla who died in 514. His maternal aunt was Cinnia of Druim Dubhain (Feast Day 1 February). His maternal 1st cousin once removed was Damhnat of Slieve Betha (Feast Day 13 June). His maternal second cousin was Enda of Aran (Feast Day 21 March). His fourth cousins were Saints Dallán Forgaill and Mogue.

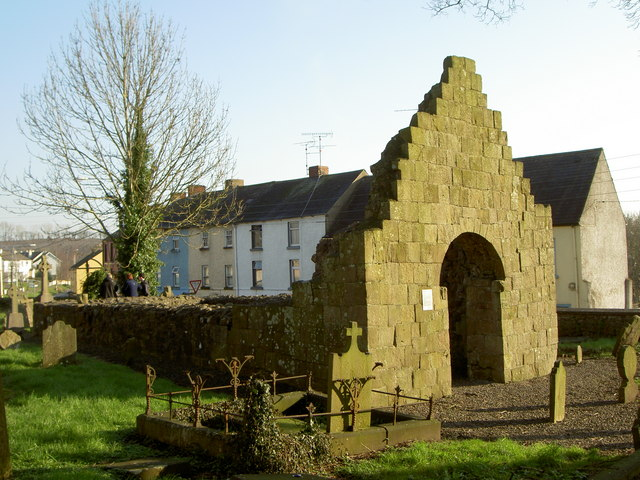
Abbey of SS Peter and Paul, Clones, founded by Tigernach.

The Life goes on to describe a number of experiences in preparation for his career in Ulster: he was educated in Rosnat in Britain. Lanigan identifies Rosnat with Candida Casa, established by Ninian sometime before. However, David Dumville does not find that credible and notes that St. Davids's in Dyfed has also been proposed. Having heard his teacher prophesy the foundation of a prominent church, Tigernach went to Rome to obtain relics and returned to Brigit in Leinster, who urged him to become a bishop.

Tigernach then travelled to his birth land, but is not shown founding any church before relations with the ruling dynasty and the churches of the area are put in order. Eochaid welcomed Tigernach as a dear kinsman and offered to install him as bishop in Clogher. Since, however, this involved ejecting the bishop then in office, Tigernach refused and retreated to a minor church on a mountain slope. However, he earned a good reputation for his ascetic lifestyle and for a miracle by which he raised Doach, the archbishop of Armagh, from the dead. An angel appeared to him and following his directions, Tigernach sought out the boundary of the kingdom to make his first foundation, namely Galloon. Inspired by God, he offered it to Comgall of Bangor and moved a little further east to found Clones. There he is said to have lived like a hermit and died of plague.

His festival is 4 April.

== History of the abbey ==
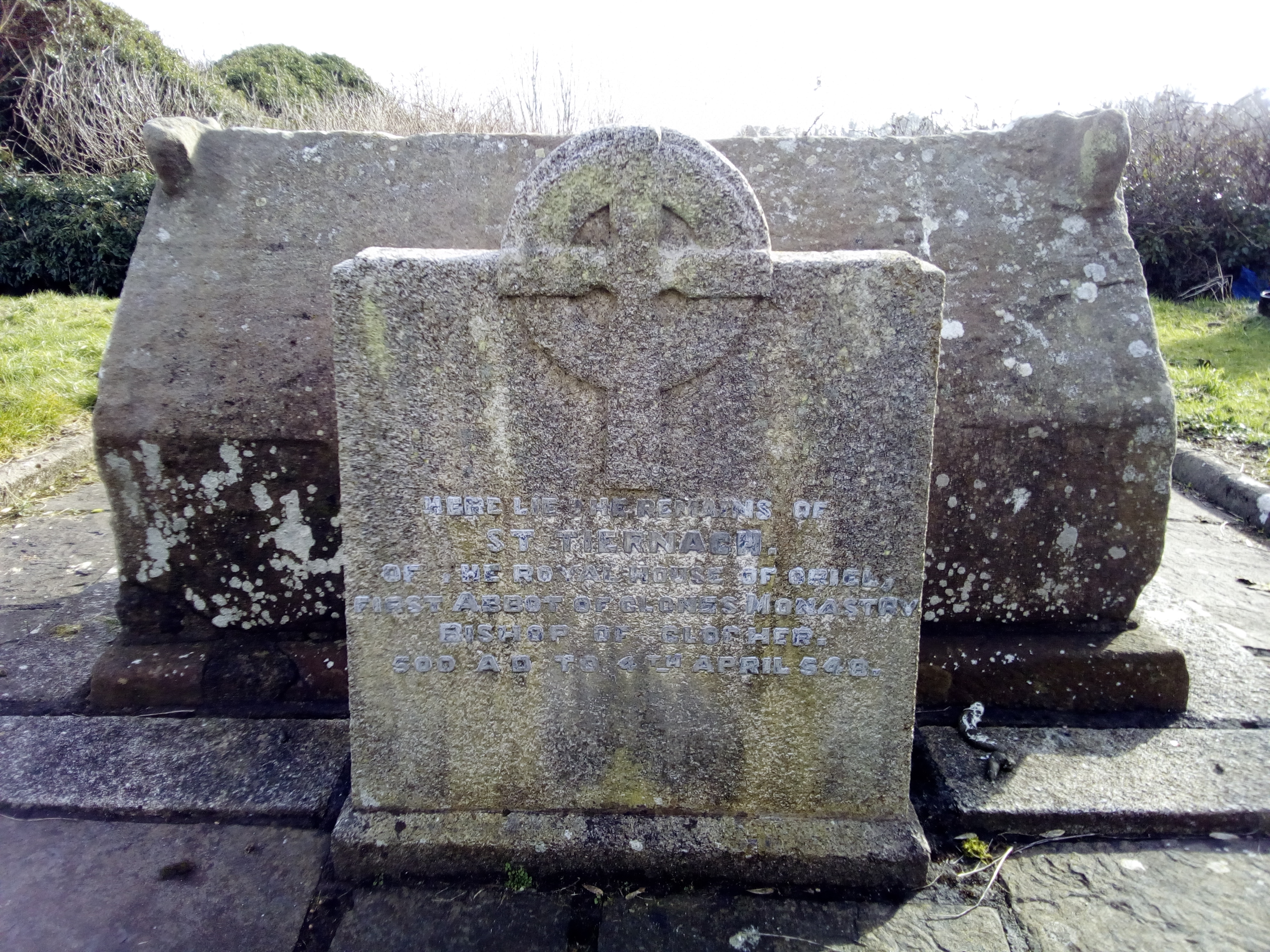
Medieval stone sarcophagus of St. Tigernach, with a modern inscribed slab giving details of his life. In the graveyard by the round tower at Clones.

Clones Abbey, the abbey founded by Tigernach in the 6th century, was dedicated to the Apostles Peter and Paul. It was still active before the dissolution of the monasteries by Henry VIII, but it had experienced a number of misfortunes. The abbey was destroyed by fire in 836, 1095, and in 1184. In 1207, Hugh de Lacy destroyed the abbey and town; but five years after they were rebuilt by the English, who also erected a castle here. The ruins of a 12th-century abbey building can still be found in the town, along with a sarcophagus reputed to have been built to house Tigernach's remains, and a 9th-century round tower and high cross.
