= Narin, County Donegal =

Seaside village in County Donegal, Ireland

Narin An Fhearthainn
- Village
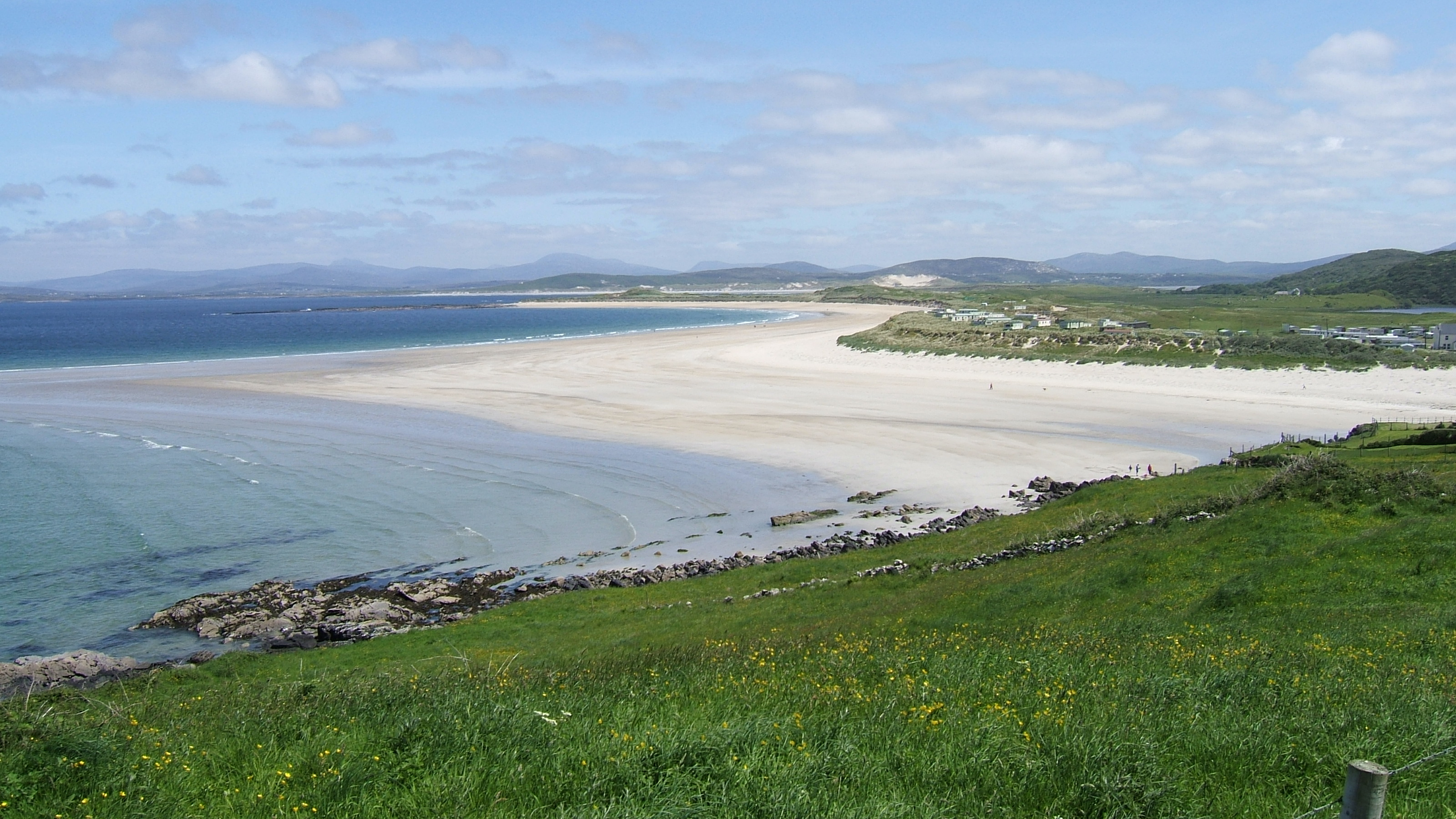
- Narin strand

- Location in Ireland
- Coordinates: 54°50′19″N 8°26′47″W
- Country: Ireland
- Province: Ulster
- County: County Donegal
- Time zone: UTC+0 (WET)
  - Summer (DST): UTC-1 (IST (WEST))
- Irish Grid Reference: G818944

Narin (Irish: An Fhearthainn), also Naran, is a small seaside village and townland in the parish of Ardara on the southwest coast of County Donegal, Ireland. The topography is rough rolling bogland and craggy low hills. Narin Strand is a sand beach approximately two kilometres long. Inishkeel island is located approximately 250 metres from the mainland in Gweebarra Bay and can be reached on foot at low tide by crossing a tidal sand bank. The population of Narin is spread sparsely around the countryside in mostly modern housing. There is a large tourist trade served by several bed and breakfasts and caravan parks. Local amenities consist of a pub, coffee shop and public toilets. There is also an 18-hole golf links with a clubhouse. Narin lies at an altitude of 12 metres and lies 8 km north of Ardara, 11 km northwest of Glenties and 13 km south of Dungloe. Brendan Behan stayed with his wife in Narin in 1961, where they spent much time swimming.

== Gallery ==
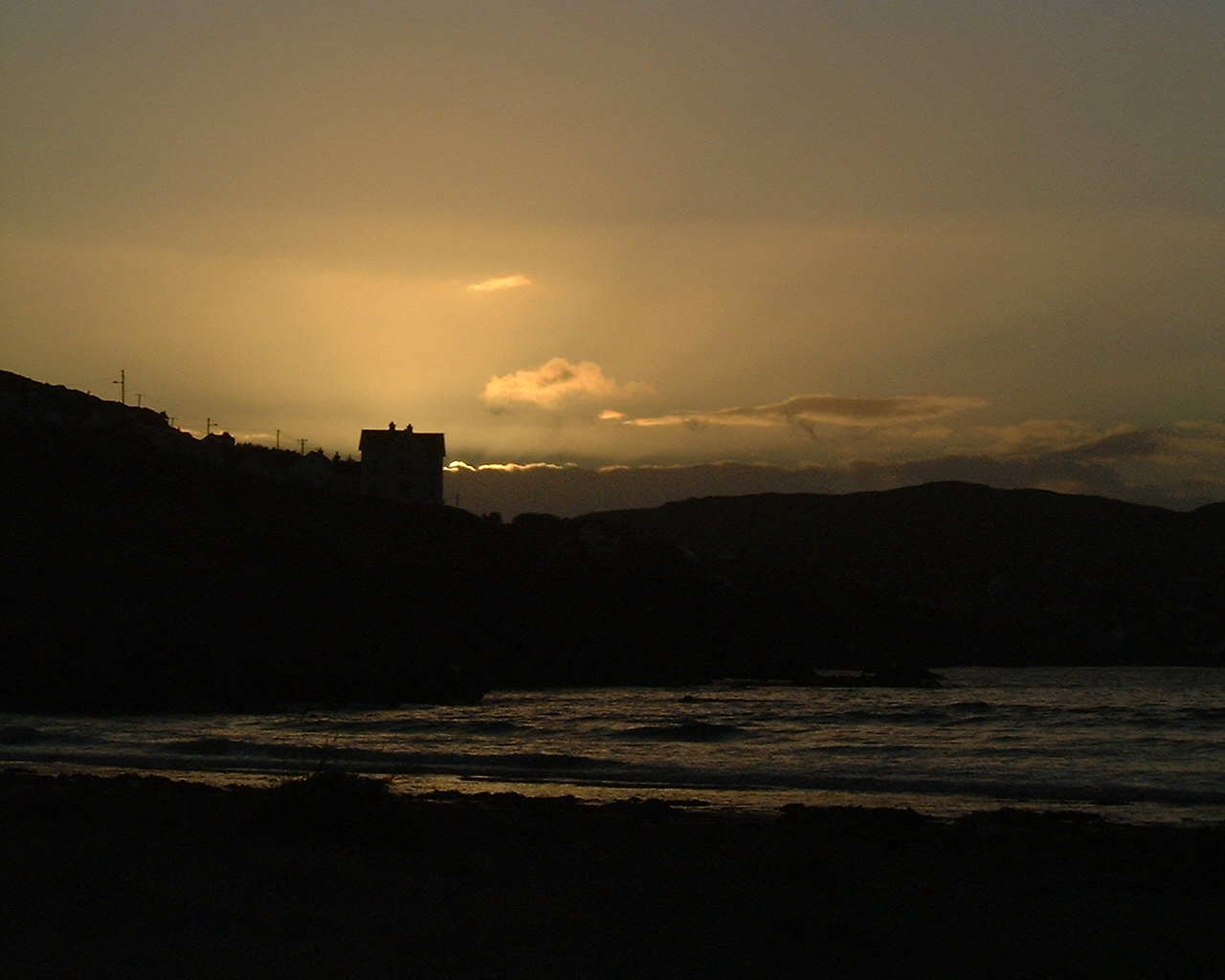
Sunset over Portnoo from Narin Strand

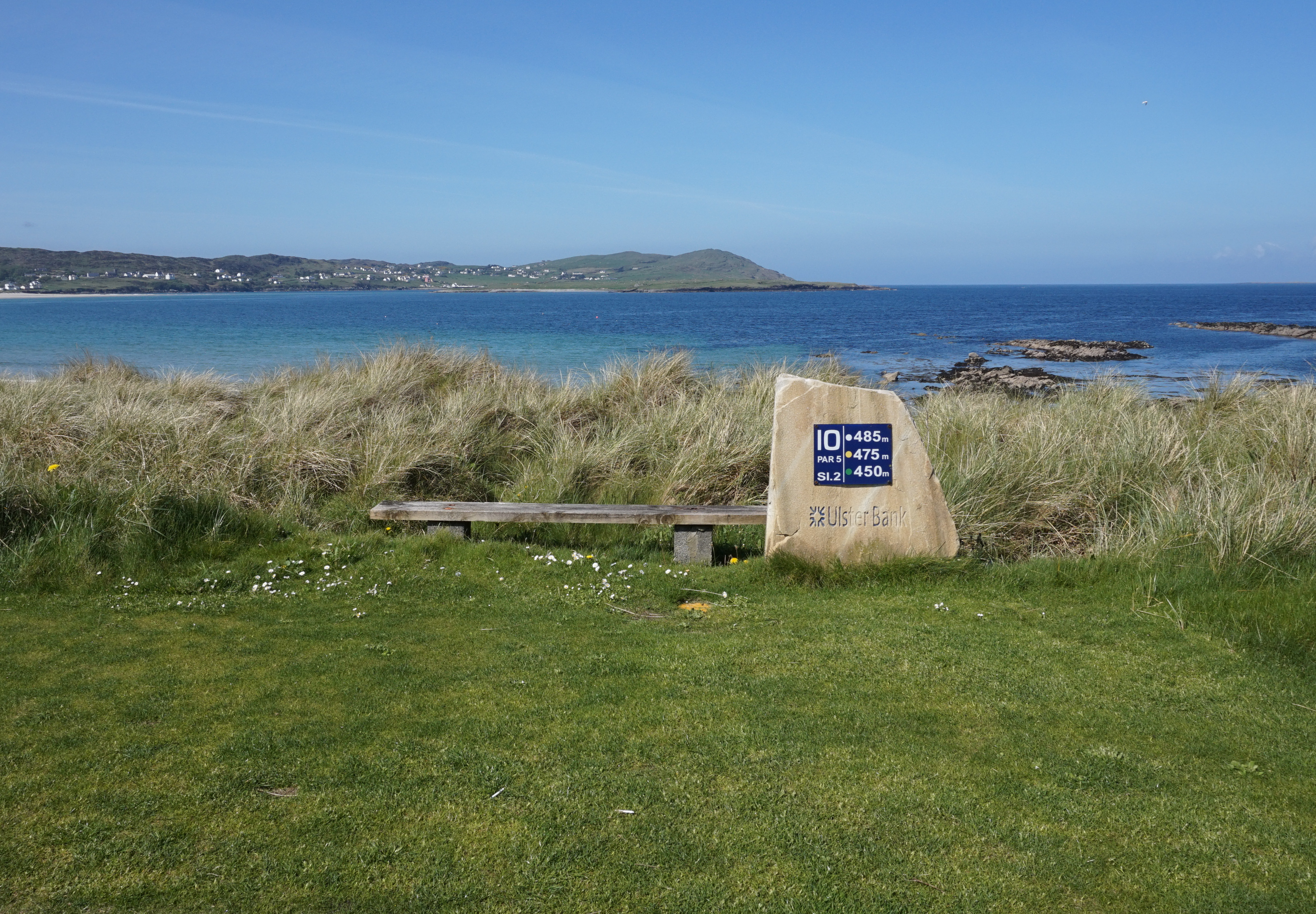
10th hole of the Narin & Portnoo Golf Club

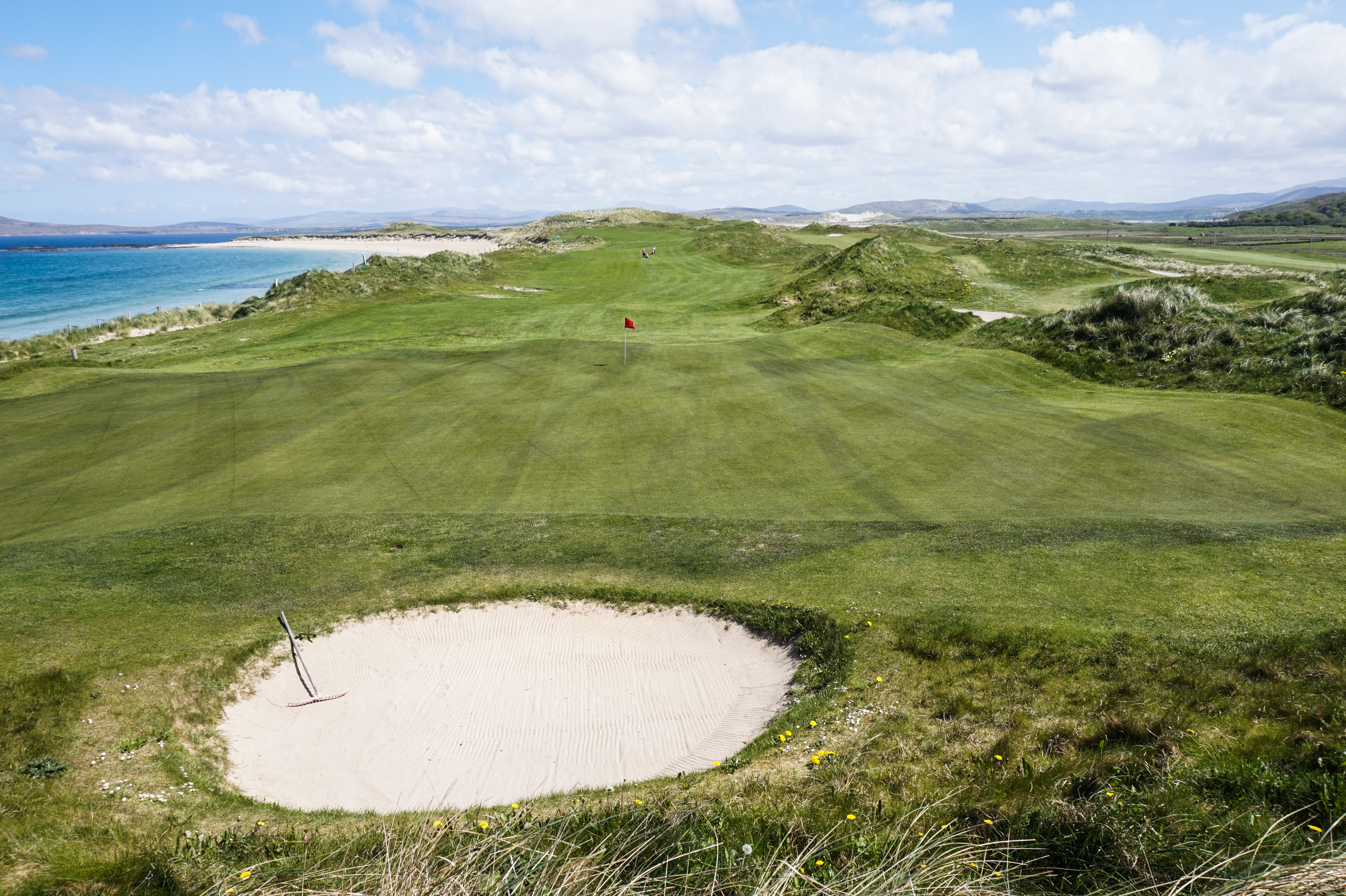
Narin & Portnoo Golf Club

== See also ==
- List of towns and villages in Ireland
