= Gweebarra Bay =

- Irish: Béal an Bheara
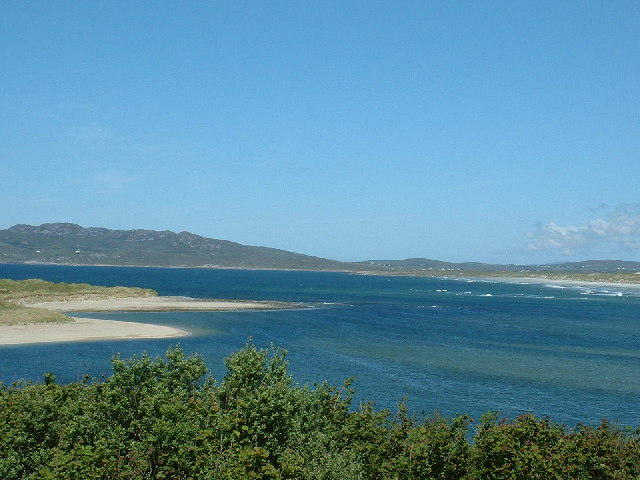
- A view of the Bay.

- Location in Ireland
- Location: County Donegal, Ireland
- Coordinates: 54°52′N 8°26′W
- Type: Bay
- Primary inflows: River Gweebarra

Gweebarra Bay (Irish: Béal an Bheara, meaning 'mouth of the inlet' is located on the west coast of County Donegal, in Ireland. The mouth of the River Gweebarra and Inishkeel Island are here.

The towns near the bay are Narin, Portnoo, Lettermacaward, and Cor.

== References in popular culture ==
- The majority of Lucy Caldwell's 2006 novel Where They Were Missed is set around Gweebarra Bay.
- Irish singer Maggie Boyle's song "Gweebarra Shore" (album 'Gweebarra' 1998) tells of loss and of childhood memories of this place.
- Poet Seamus Heaney refers to Gweebarra in his poem "The Singer's House" published in 1979 as part of his collection Field Work.
- Irish Singer Hozier makes reference to Gweebarra in his song 'Butchered Tongue' (from the 2023 Unreal Unearth album) dealing with marginalisation and oppression of minority and indigenous languages such as Irish.

== See also ==
- List of bays of the British Isles
