= Mannan Castle =

- Caisleán Dhomhnach Maighean (Irish)
- Manann Castle
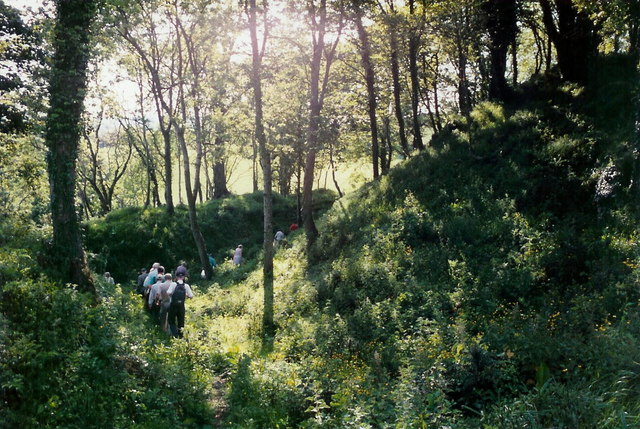
- Edge of the motte, overgrown with vegetation

- Location within Ireland
- 54.007251°N 6.698852°W
- Type: motte-and-bailey
- Location: Donaghmoyne, Carrickmacross, County Monaghan, Ireland

History
- Built: 1193

Site notes
- Height: 12.5 m (41 ft)
- Area: Farney
- Owner: public

National monument of Ireland
- Official name: Mannan Castle
- Reference no.: 382

Mannan Castle is a motte-and-bailey and National Monument located in Donaghmoyne Townland, Tullynacross, on site of the Mannan Castle Golf Club, in County Monaghan, Ireland.

== Location ==
Mannan Castle is located on mannan Castle Golf Club, on a south-facing slope of a limestone drumlin ridge about 3 km (1.9 mi) northeast of Carrickmacross.

== History ==
This site is believed to have been the ancient capital of Airgíalla (Oriel), a kingdom originating sometime in the pre-Christian era (according to semi-mythical accounts, it was founded by The Three Collas in AD 331).

A motte-and-bailey was constructed in 1193 by the powerful Anglo-Norman Pipard family (Sir Roger Pipard, c.1136 – before 1225), to consolidate their hold over the region. They first built a wooden castle. This site was not necessarily chosen for its military or defensive usefulness but for reasons of prestige. By building atop an ancient Gaelic Irish capital, the Norman conquest of Ireland was made clear. In 1227 the Pipard lands were entrusted to Ralph Fitz Nicholas. He began to strengthen Mannan Castle; it was burned by the Irish in 1230 and replaced by a stone castle in 1244.

Various local legends attach to the castle; one claims that the mortar was made with animal blood and this is why a stone cannot be dislodged from the wall. Another connects the name with a druid named Manann, although the early names are derived from Irish maighean ("of the plain").

The first archaeological survey of the site was carried out in 1910 by Henry Morris. Later excavations found large amounts of iron slag, pottery, iron nails and ironworking tools in the southern part of the bailey.

== Building ==
Mannan Castle is a motte (12.5 m high) and inner bailey connected by a causeway with a ditch and an outer bailey without a ditch. The stone ruins of a keep are atop the motte.
