= Cinnia =

5th-century Irish saint

Saint Cinnia
- Born: 5th century Ireland
- Died: Ireland
- Feast: 1 February
- Patronage: Catholic Church, Eastern Orthodox Church
- Influences: Saint Patrick

Cinnia, or Cynnia, was an Irish saint who lived during the 5th century. She was a princess of Ulster, the only daughter of Echu (or Eochaidh), a king in Ireland.

She converted to Christianity, but her father wanted her to marry Corburac, so Saint Patrick intervened on her behalf. Her father agreed to allow her to become a nun, on the condition that Patrick "promised him eternal life without compelling him to be baptized". Patrick agreed, and Cinnia entered the Monastery of Druimduchan, a large community of virgins, under the care of the abbess Cathuberis, where Cinnia lived until her death. Cinnia was responsible for the conversion of many pagans and was well known for her miracles, which occurred both during her life and after she died.

Hagiographer Agnes Dunbar states that Cinnia might have been Patrick's sister, although that is unlikely. Her feast day is February 1.
