= Ray Church =

- Teampall Ráithe
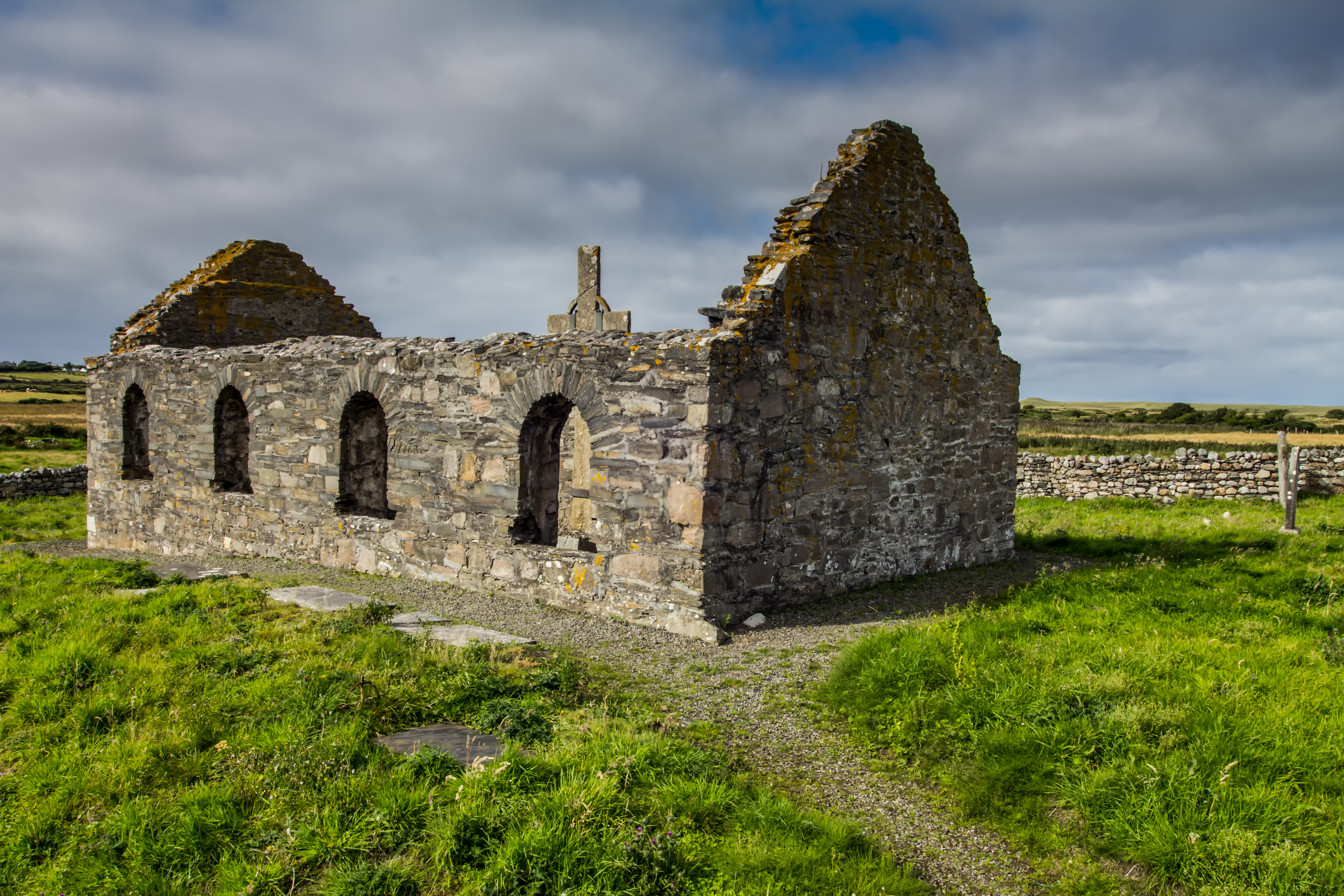

- Location within Ireland
- 55.147379°N 8.070682°W
- Location: Ray, Falcarragh, County Donegal
- Country: Ireland
- Denomination: Church of Ireland
- Previous denomination: Catholic

History
- Founded: 6th century AD
- Founder: St. Fionnán

Architecture
- Functional status: inactive

Administration
- Diocese: Raphoe
Designations
National monument of Ireland
- Official name: Ray Church
- Reference no.: 23

Ray Church (/ˈraɪ/) is a medieval church and National Monument in County Donegal, Ireland.

== Location ==
Ray Church is located 2.5 km (1.6 mi) northeast of Falcarragh, near the confluence of the Yellow River and Ray River.

== History ==
St Fionnán founded this church in the 6th century. Ray stood next to the Ray River, an ancient boundary between the Cenél Luighdech and Cenél Duach. Four 7th-century abbots of Iona were of the Cenél Duach; Ray was almost certainly their home church.

Ray high cross is the largest early medieval stone cross in Ireland. Local lore claims it was made for Columba (521–597) at Muckish to bring to Tory Island, but local saint Fionnán recovered Columba's Gospel Book and he gave the cross to Ray. The cross actually dates to the late 8th century.

The church was destroyed by Oliver Cromwell's soldiers in the 17th century. During Sunday Mass, the entire congregation was slaughtered in the Massacre of Ray (Marfach Ráithe). The dead are buried in a mass grave called Resting Place of the Bones (Lag na gCnámh).

The cross was knocked down in a storm about 1750, and lay broken in the graveyard until it was repaired by the Office of Public Works in the 1970s.

== Buildings ==
=== Church ===
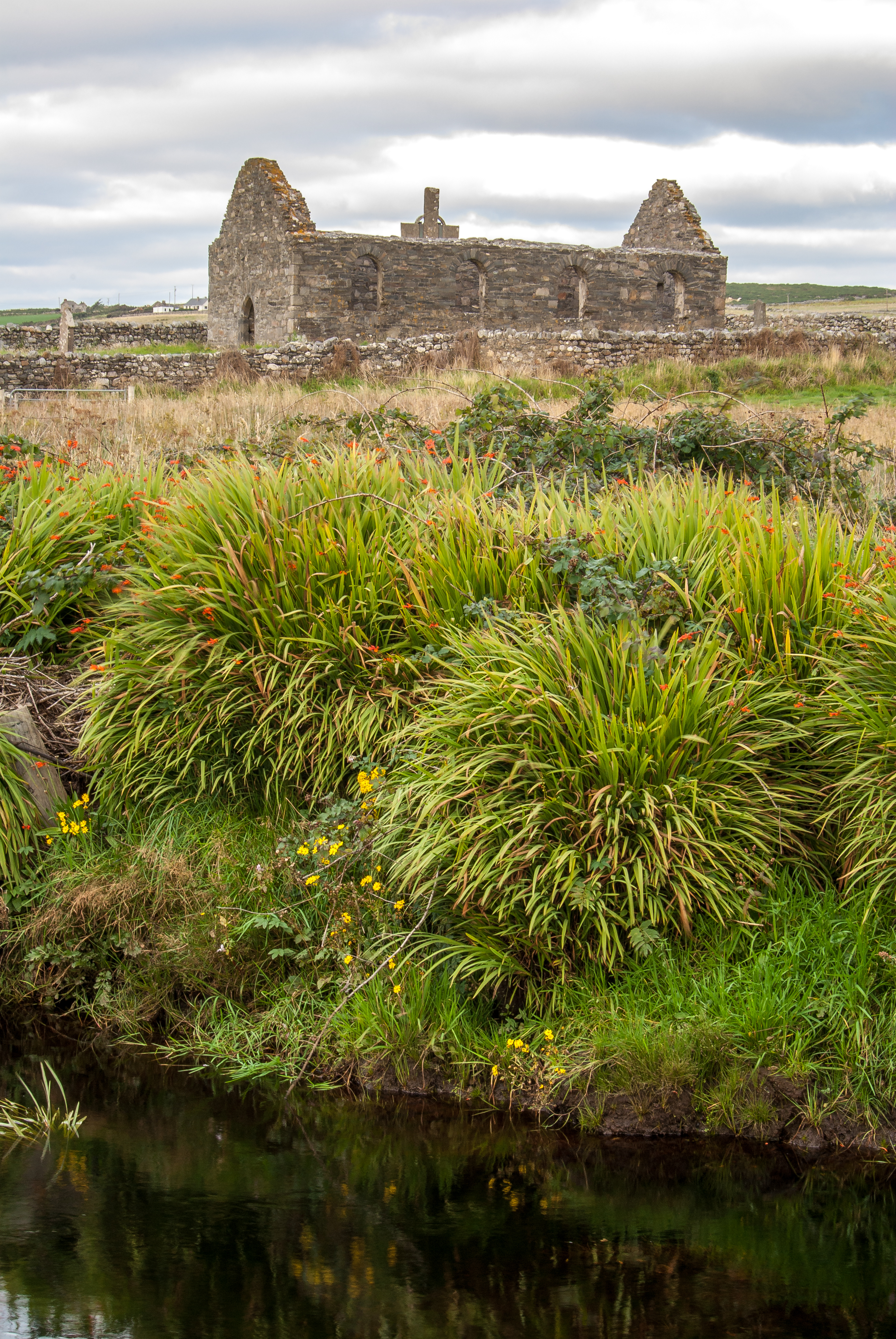
Church and cross with river visible

The church is rectangular with wide round-arched windows.

=== Cross ===
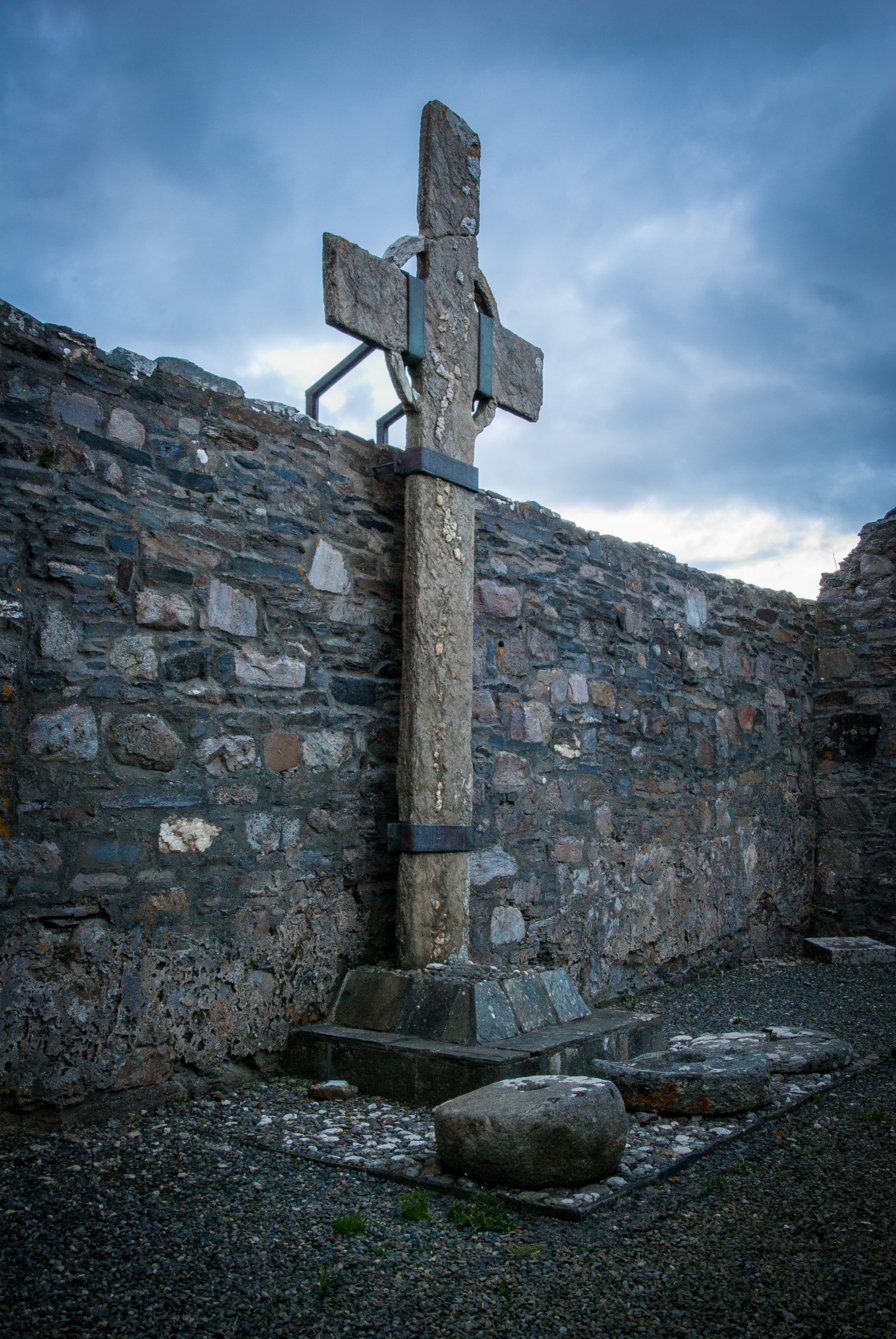
St Colm Cille's Cross

St Colm Cille's Cross, 5.56 m (18.2 ft) high and 2.26 m (7 ft 5 in) across and made of slate, was modelled on Saint John's Cross, Iona.

=== Nearby ===
A basin stone and standing stone are nearby.
