= Errigal Ringfort =

Ringfort in County Cavan, Ireland

- Ráth Aireagail (Irish)
- Location within Ireland
- 54.065652°N 7.103841°W
- Type: ringfort
- Periods: Bronze or Iron Age (c. 2400 BC – AD 400)
- Location: Errigal, Cootehill, County Cavan, Ireland

Site notes
- Material: earth
- Area: 951 m^{2} (10,240 sq ft)
- Owner: private

Designations
- Designation: National Monument

National monument of Ireland
- Official name: Errigal
- Reference no.: 585

Errigal Ringfort, also called Fort William, is a ringfort (rath) and National Monument located in County Cavan, Ireland.

== Location ==
Errigal Ringfort is located about 1.6 km (0.99 mi) west-southwest of Cootehill, just north of the Annalee River.
