= Lough Barra =

Lake in County Donegal, Ireland

- Loch Beara (Irish)
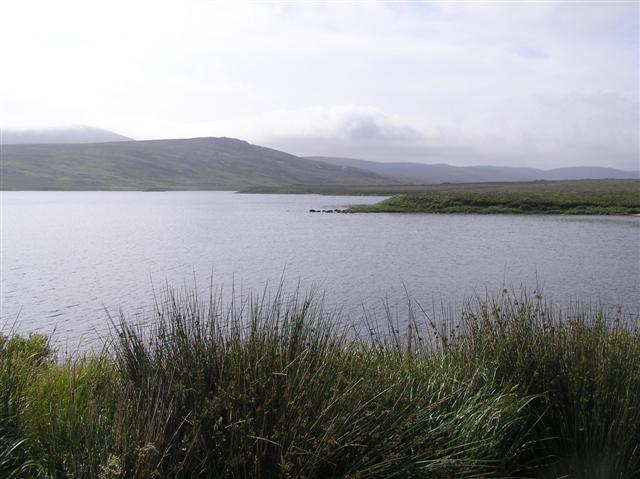

- Location in Ireland
- Location: County Donegal
- Coordinates: 54°57′26″N 8°6′19″W
- Primary inflows: River Barra
- Primary outflows: Gweebarra River
- Catchment area: 19.68 km^{2} (7.6 sq mi)
- Basin countries: Ireland
- Max. length: 1.4 km (1 mi)
- Max. width: 0.8 km (0.5 mi)
- Surface area: 0.63 km^{2} (0.24 sq mi)
- Average depth: 4.4 m (14 ft)
- Max. depth: 11.6 m (38 ft)
- Surface elevation: 90 m (300 ft)

Lough Barra (Irish: Loch Beara) is a freshwater lake in the northwest of Ireland. It is located in north County Donegal in the valley along the Gweebarra fault.

== Geography ==
Lough Barra is about 30 kilometres (19 mi) west of Letterkenny, just outside the southwest corner of Glenveagh National Park. It measures about 1.5 km (0.9 mi) long and 1 km (0.6 mi) wide.

== Hydrology ==
Lough Barra is fed mainly by the Barra River entering at its northern end. The lake drains southwards into the Gweebarra River. The lake, like other area lakes, is oligotrophic.

== Natural history ==
Fish species in Lough Barra include brown trout, salmon and the critically endangered European eel. Lough Barra is part of the Cloghernagore Bog and Glenveagh National Park Special Area of Conservation, which also includes Lough Beagh.

== See also ==
- List of loughs in Ireland
- List of Special Areas of Conservation in the Republic of Ireland
