= Pluck Standing Stone =

- Gallán Phluic (Irish)
- Location within Ireland
- 54.939586°N 7.636319°W
- Type: standing stone
- Location: Pluck, Manorcunningham, County Donegal, Ireland

History
- Built: c. 4000–2500 BC

Site notes
- Elevation: 3 m (9.8 ft)
- Height: 2 m (6 ft 7 in)
- Area: Drongawn Lough

National monument of Ireland
- Official name: Pluck Standing Stone
- Reference no.: 453

Pluck Standing Stone is a standing stone and National Monument located in County Donegal, Ireland.

== Location ==
Pluck Standing Stone is located 2 km (1.2 mi) southwest of Manorcunningham.

== History ==
Stone vessels have been dug up beneath and around Pluck Standing Stone.
