= Cairnbaine =

- An Carn Bán (Irish)
- Tiredigan Court Tomb; Cairnbaine Giant's Grave
- Location in Ireland
- 54.197271°N 7.074729°W
- Type: court cairn
- Location: Tiredegan, Smithborough, County Monaghan, Ireland

History
- Built: c. 3500 BC

Site notes
- Elevation: 129 m (423 ft)
- Area: Dartree

National monument of Ireland
- Official name: Cairnbaine
- Reference no.: 367

Cairnbaine, also called Tiredigan Court Tomb, is a court cairn and National Monument in County Monaghan, Ireland.

== Location ==
Cairnbaine is located 2.9 km (1.8 mi) southwest of Three Mile House.

== History ==
Court cairns are the oldest kind of megalithic monument in Ireland, being built from 4000 BC onward.

== Description ==
Cairnbaine is a dual court tomb. The gallery is exposed and one roof slab is in place. In front of the gallery are court stones and the remains of a façade. The cairn itself is trapezoidal and measures 30 m (98 ft) long and 15 m (49 ft) wide.
