= Mullyash Kerbed Cairn =

Barrow in Ireland

- Carn Chiumhais Mhullaigh Aise (Irish)
- Mullyash Carn
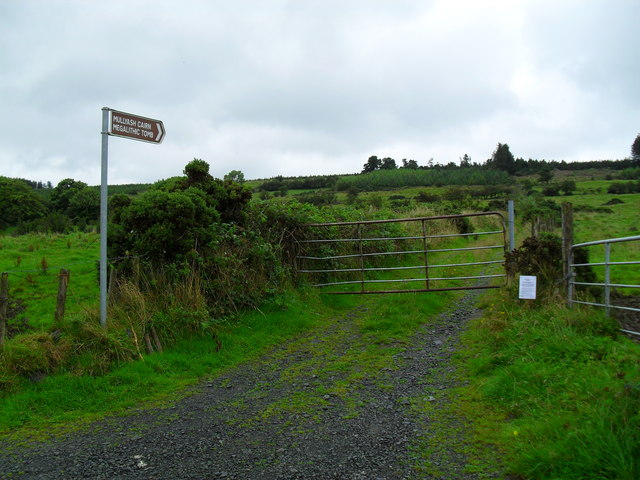
- Lane to Mullyash Cairn

- Location within Ireland
- 54.17422°N 6.669354°W
- Type: bowl barrow
- Location: Mullyash, Cremorne, County Monaghan, Republic of Ireland

History
- Built: c. 4000 BC

Site notes
- Elevation: 317 m (1,040 ft)
- Height: 1.85 m (6 ft 1 in)
- Area: Mullyash Mountains
- Owner: Coillte

National monument of Ireland
- Official name: Mullyash
- Reference no.: 564

Mullyash Kerbed Cairn is a kerb cairn (bowl barrow) and National Monument located in County Monaghan, Ireland.

== Location ==
Mullyash Kerbed Cairn is located at the peak of Mullyash Mountain, 7.5 km (4.7 mi) northeast of Castleblayney, near the border.

== History ==
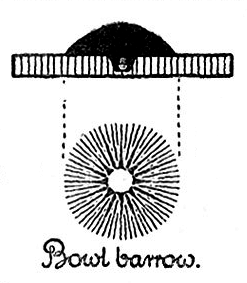
Cross-section of a typical bowl barrow

The cairn dates back to the early Neolithic, c. 4000 BC. The cairn was visible from all parts of the surrounding countryside (at least until the view was blocked by modern tree-planting). From Mullyash one could see as far as Slieve Gullion, Loughcrew, the Mourne Mountains and Cooley Mountains.

Until modern times, the cairn was visited by locals on the last Sunday in July (Crom Dubh's Sunday), a remnant of the Celtic festival of Lughnasadh. Celebrants climbed from the southwest, danced and celebrated at the cairn, and walked down to the west to a standing stone. Mullyash was renowned for matchmaking.

Local legend connected the cairn with the urn burial of a nobleman's daughter. Her father murdered her after she eloped with a young prince of whom he did not approve. If mortals eat certain foods they can see the gold treasure buried with her; perhaps a remnant of ancient shamanic rituals. Another legend claims that Fionn mac Cumhaill threw a stone from Slieve Gullion to Mullyash (a distance of 16.6 km / 10.3 mi), and this is the standing stone that still is there.

== Description ==
Mullyash Kerbed Cairn is a stepped two-tiered kerbed cairn or bowl barrow, or possibly a kind of passage grave. The walls are revetted and the cairn is about 16 m (52 ft) in diameter and 1.85 m (6 ft 1 in) high.

The standing stone is located 200 m west of the cairn. It once stood 3.6 m (12 ft) high but is now broken.
