= Lisnagowan Ringfort =

Ringfort in County Cavan, Ireland

- Lios na nGabhann (Irish)
- Location within Ireland
- 54.058257°N 7.305186°W
- Type: ringfort
- Location: Lisnagowan, Drumahaire, County Cavan, Ireland

History
- Built: c. AD 550–900

Site notes
- Material: earth
- Owner: private

Designations
- Designation: National Monument

National monument of Ireland
- Official name: Lisnagowan
- Reference no.: 616

Lisnagowan Ringfort is a ringfort (rath) and National Monument located in County Cavan, Ireland.

== Location ==
Lisnagowan Ringfort is located about 1.6 km (0.99 mi) north-northeast of Ballyhaise, on the north bank of the Annalee River.
