= Cabragh Ringfort =

Ringfort in County Cavan, Ireland

- Ráth na Cabraí (Irish)
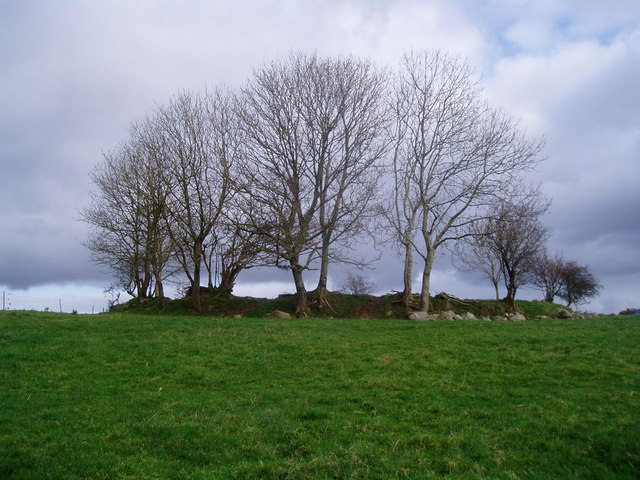

- Location within Ireland
- 54.05389°N 7.109000°W
- Type: ringfort
- Periods: Bronze or Iron Age (c. 2400 BC – AD 400)
- Location: Cabragh, Cootehill, County Cavan, Ireland

Site notes
- Material: earth
- Owner: private

Designations
- Designation: National Monument

National monument of Ireland
- Official name: Cabragh
- Reference no.: 585

Cabragh Ringfort is a ringfort (rath) and National Monument located in County Cavan, Ireland.

== Location ==
Cabragh Ringfort is located about 2.7 km (1.7 mi) southwest of Cootehill.
