= Clones Abbey =

- Mainistir Cluain Eois (Irish)
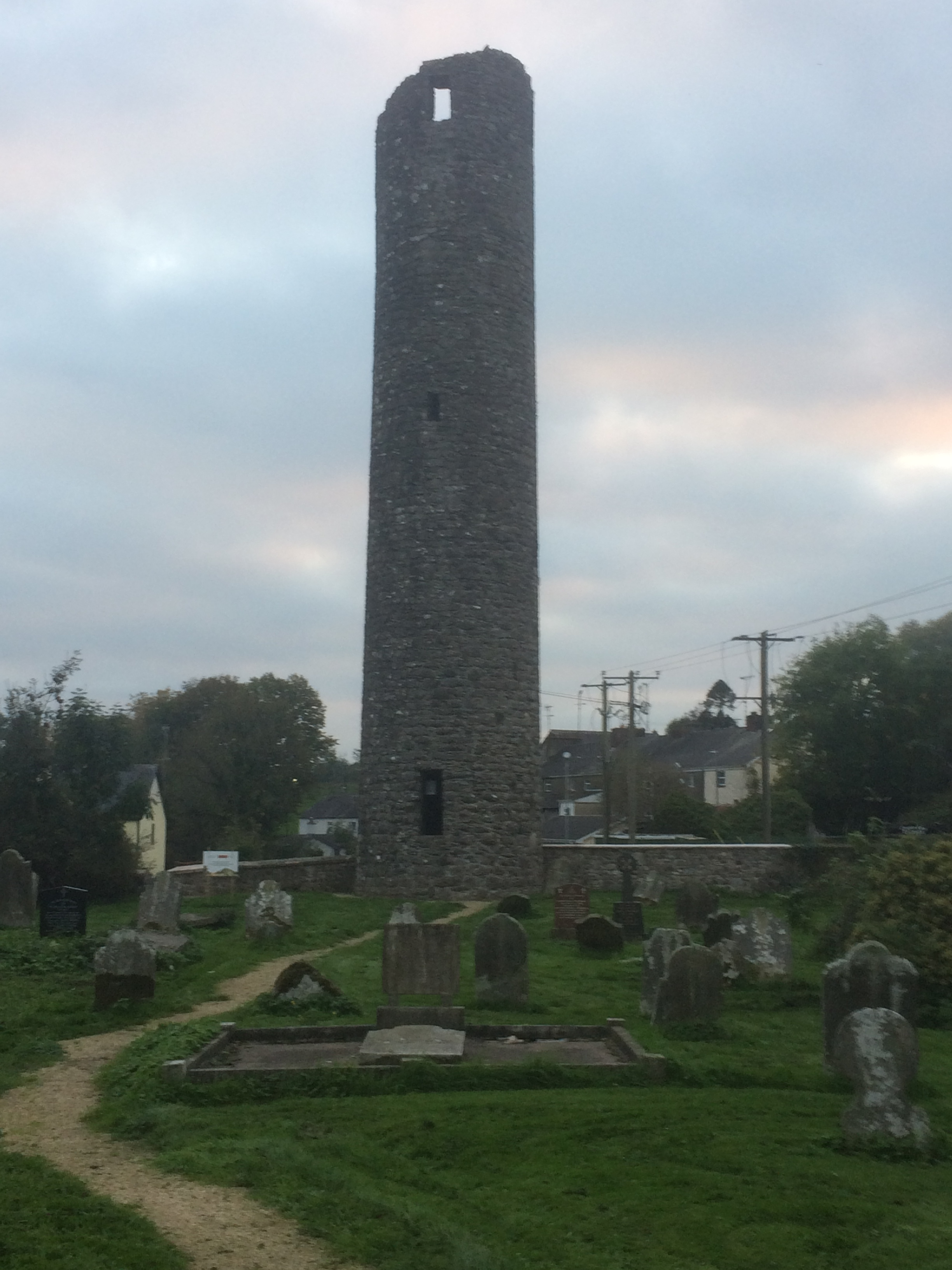
- Clones Round Tower and graveyard

- Location within Ireland
- 54°10′59″N 7°14′01″W
- Location: County Monaghan, Ireland

History
- Built: 12th century

Site notes
- Area: Clones

National monument of Ireland
- Official name: Clones
- Reference no.: 111 & 112

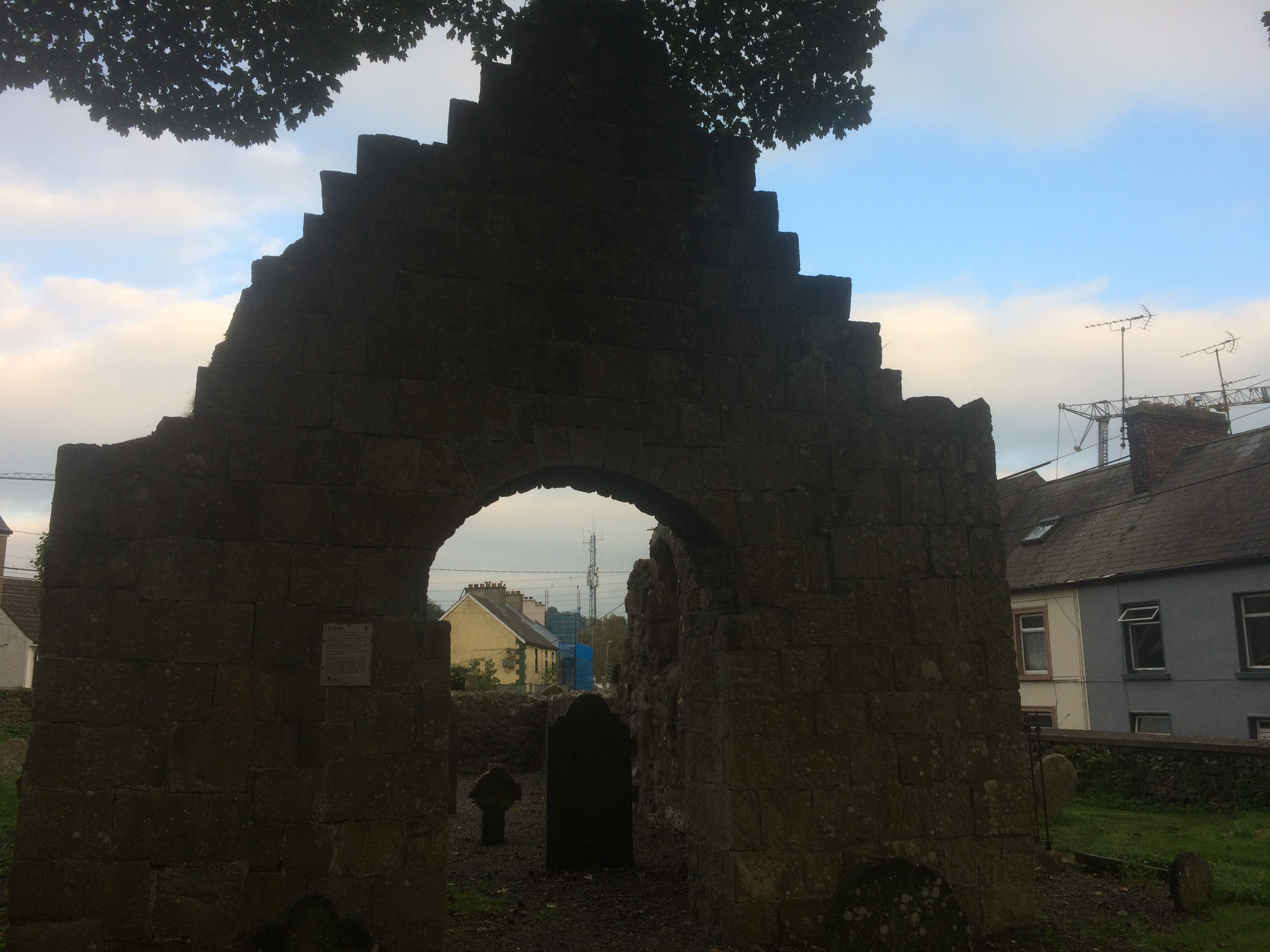
The "Wee Abbey"

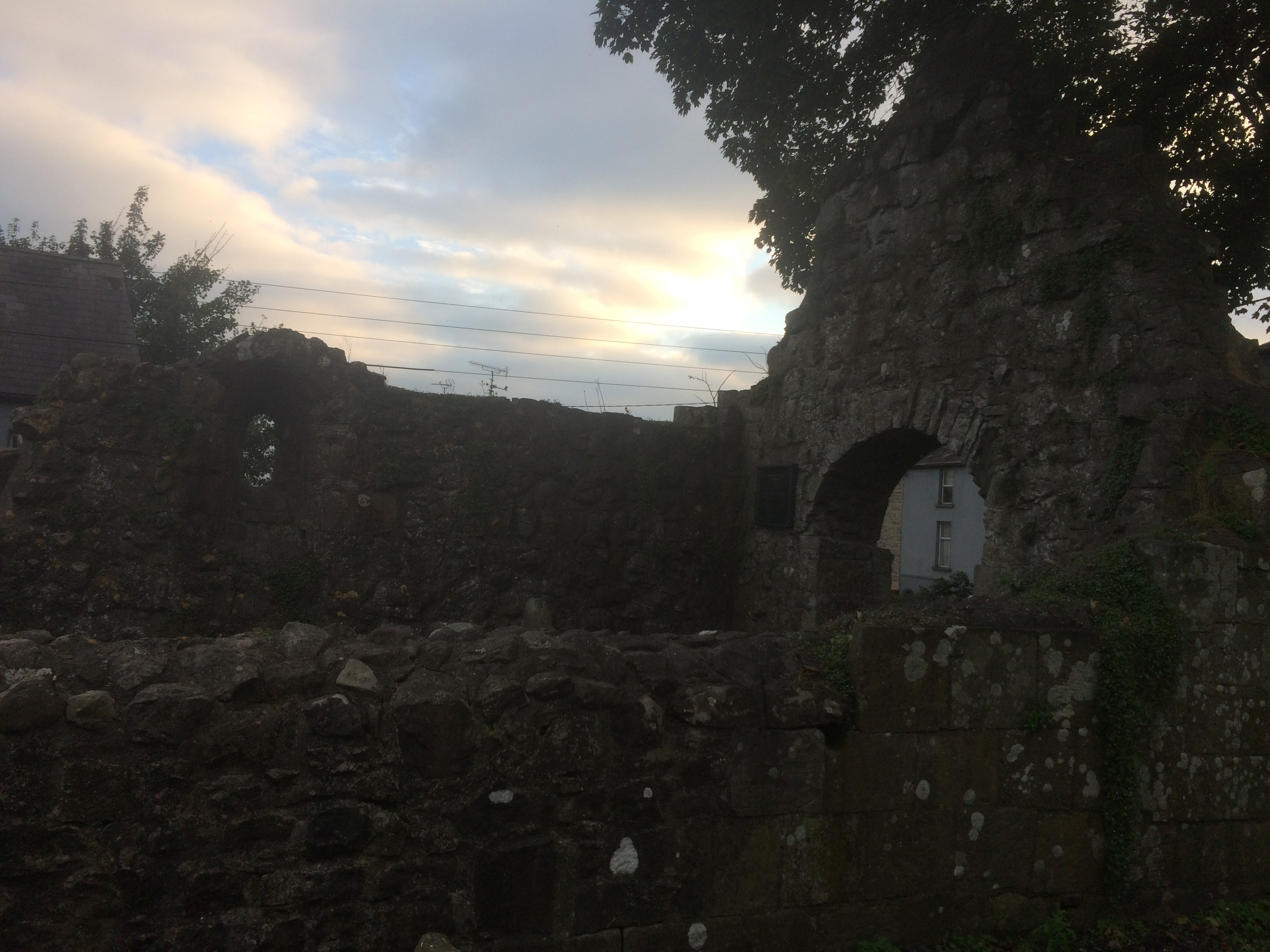
Clones Abbey - side view

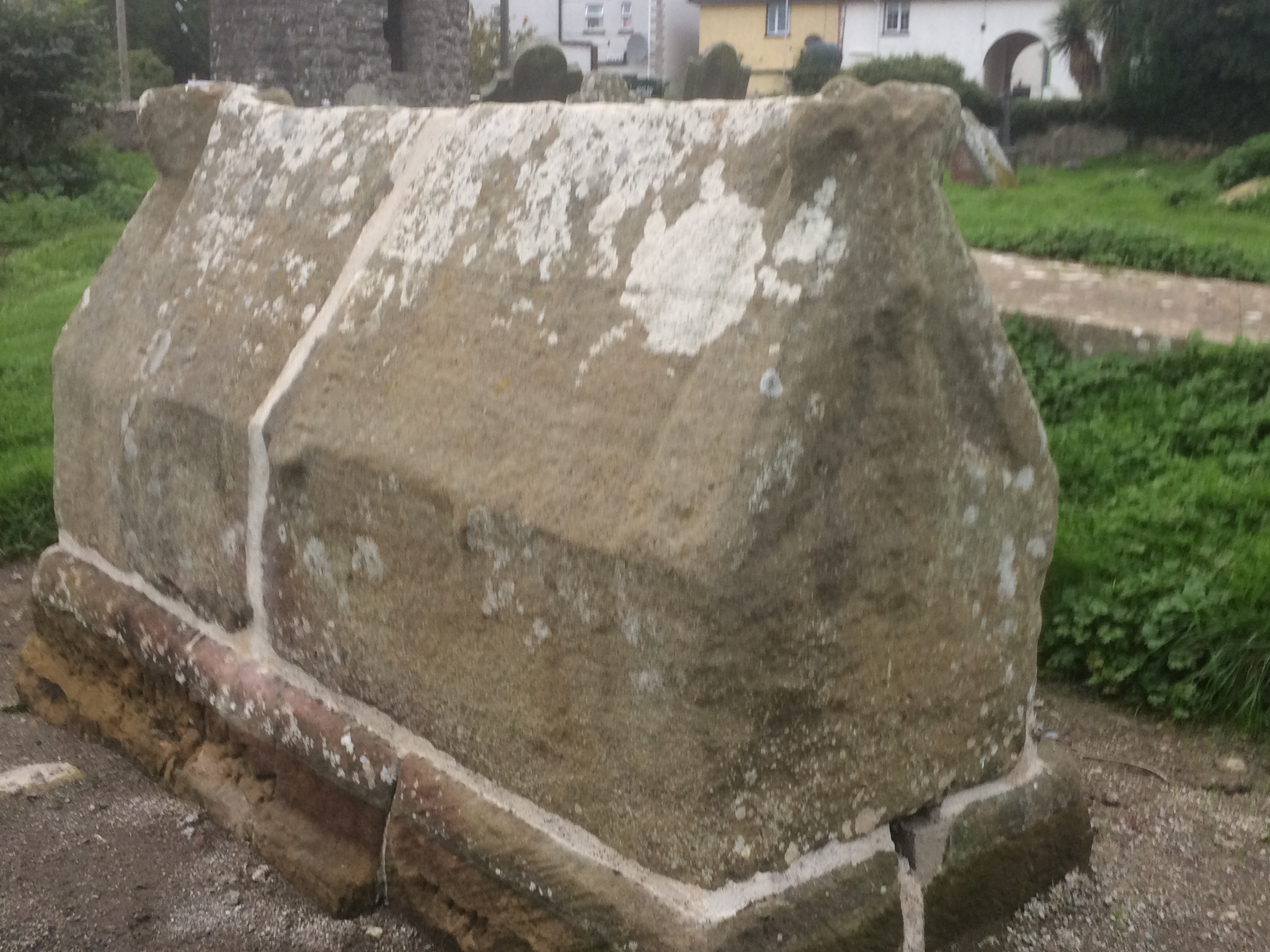
St. Tighernach's Tomb

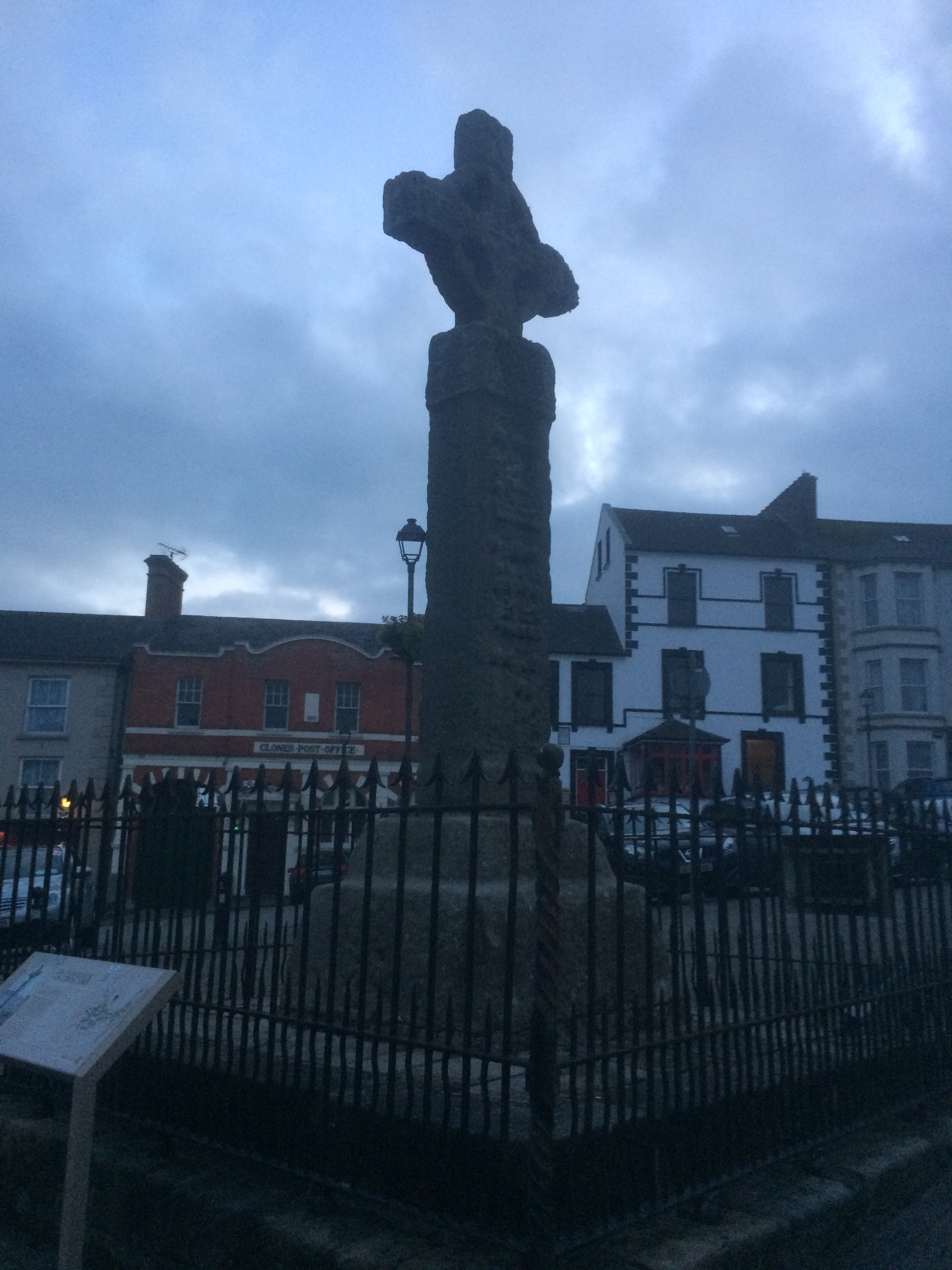
Clones High Cross

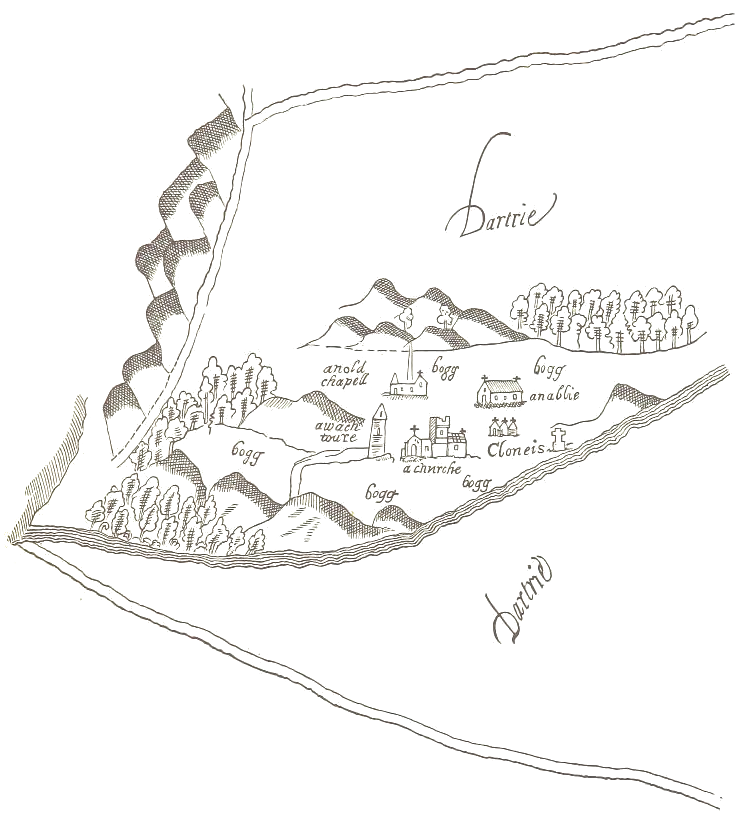
This drawing from c. 1587 shows the church of the Augustinian abbey, labelled a churche, still standing with its tower and choir at the site of the graveyard, east of the round tower and west of the surviving ruin of the small Romanesque church.

Clones Abbey is a ruined monastery that later became an Augustinian abbey in the twelfth century, and its main sights are ecclesiastical. It was formerly known as St. Tighernach's Abbey, and was referred to locally as the "wee abbey". Parochial and monastic settlements were separated, and it seems likely that the building became the Abbey of St. Peter and Paul. In the Book of Armagh and Annals of Ulster the word Clones is referenced as "Clauin Auis" and "Cluain Auiss," respectively. As there is no word in standard dictionaries of Old Irish that give the form "auis" or "eois", Seosamh Ó Dufaigh has speculated that the word is a cognate of the Welsh word for point or a tip: "awch". Bearnard O'Dubhthaigh disputes this theory on the grounds that the earlier form of "awch" is "afwch". Folklore suggests that the monastic town was originally called "Cluin Innish" due to being surrounded by water.

== History ==
The Town of Clones and the Abbey were founded by St. Tigernach (anglicised St. Tierney) in the 6th century. St. Tigernach or Tierney's abbey was dedicated to St. Peter and St. Paul. The abbey was destroyed by fire in 836, 1095, and 1184. In 1207, Hugh de Lacy destroyed the abbey and town, but five years later, they were rebuilt by the English, who also erected a castle here. The ruins of a 12th-century abbey can be found on Abbey Street, along with a sarcophagus with worn animal-head carvings reputed to have been built to house the remains of St. Tigernach, and a 9th-century truncated 22m-high round tower, which was originally about 75 ft high and had a conical cap; and a well-preserved 10th-century high cross on the Diamond, decorated with drama-charged biblical stories such as Daniel in the lion's den, Abrahams sacrifice of Isaac, Adam and the tree and the serpent. On the reverse side, New Testament scenes are illustrated. The multiplication of the loaves, the miracle at Cana, the baptism of Christ.

The Protestant reformation lead to the suppression of the monasteries by Henry VIII in the 16th century, and the monastic settlement in Clones was destroyed. By the 17th century the abbey was a ruin, but solitary monks continued to live in the locality up until the 18th century. An English garrison was later established within the ruins.

== Style ==
The church is Romanesque in style and is evidence of the Roman church in Clones. The round-headed window is interesting, the head of which was cut out of a single stone. On the northern wall is a small Celtic cross sculptured in relief on a stone.

== Monuments ==
=== Round Tower ===
The Round Tower can be seen from Cara Street. The horizontal lintels and small windows are signs of early masonry. The doorway lacks the Romanesque arch, that is typical of medieval Christian buildings. These attributes lead one to the conclusion that it is among the oldest of the round towers on the British Isles. The tower was built to have five floors, ending in the top with a large, rectangular window. The roof of the building was undoubtedly a bencobhair; a stone, conical roof as is typical of Irish round towers. The tower itself would have reached seventy-five feet; but in its current, roofless state only reaches fifty-one. There is damage to the masonry on the exterior below the door, to the right. The cracked appearance of the stones suggests heat damage. This could be from any of the numerous instances in which the monastery was razed.

=== Abbey ===
The Abbey on McCurtain's street is a stone building: a limestone interior and sandstone exterior. The front of the building is the most well preserved. The ashlar masonry and Romanesque arch can easily be appreciated. A single window remains on the building. According to William Frederick Wakeman, the single window: cut out of a single stone, with a recessed moulding and dressed masonry, bears a resemblance to the windows on Clonmacnoise's McCarthy tower. The most singular feature of the Abbey is easily missed. Located on the exterior wall opposite the window, is a single cut stone bearing the mark of a cross. The cross is haloed in a fashion distinctly recognisable as the style of the Irish "Celtic cross". Its function has led to speculation as it is not something seen on churches of the period elsewhere.

== Abbot of Clones ==
The Abbot was the Primus Abbas or first mitred abbot of Ireland.

== List of notable coarbs and abbots ==
Note: From 1398 to 1435, there is an instance of the clash that frequently occurred between the papal provisor and the bishop's nominee.

List of notable coarbs and abbots
From	Until	Incumbent	Notes
unknown	549	Tigernach mac Coirpri ^{[B]}	founder of the abbey; died in office
unknown	806	Gormgal mac Dindnotaig	of the Uí Chremthainn, called abbot of Armagh and Clones in the entry for his obit in the annals
unknown	929	Ceanfoile	Died in office inside the abbey
unknown	unknown	Gilla Christ O'Macturan	in 1184, was elected bishop of Clogher
unknown	1247	Hugh Mac Conchaille	abbot of Clones died
unknown	1257	Mac Robias	abbot of Clones died
1316	1319	Gelasius alias Cornelius Ó Bánáin	Elected bishop-designate of Clogher and consecrated circa 1316; died 1319
unknown	1353	Sean ó Cairbre	John O Carbry died in office. His name appears on the outer shrine of the Domnach Airgid as coarb.
unknown	1365	Sean Mac An Eanaigh	John MacAneany received collation of the comorbania or rectory of Clones from primate Milo Sweetman's commissaries in the diocese of Clogher, this appointment was subsequently ratified by the primate himself.
1393	1398	Tiernacus Mac An Eanaigh	Tierney MacAneany was appointed to the rectory by the bishop of Kilmore and bishop of clogher, but in 1398 the Pope claimed he held the position unlawfully.
1393		(John ó Goband)	Appointed by the Pope. Did not take effect, later became dean of Armagh in the same year
1403		(Pádraig Mac Cathmhaoil)	Patrick Mac Cawell; Appointed by the Pope. Did not take effect
unknown	1413	Éinrí mac Conullag Mac Mathghamhna	Henry MacMahon son of Connolly appears to have been coarb but Eneas ó Cairbre detained the rectory from him having obtained it from the ordinary.
1413	unknown	Neameas O'Hanratty	A canon of Clogher, should have been collated to the rectoy then vacated by the death of Henry MacMahon. He was rehabilitated in 1417 by Martin V and received a fresh appointment from Eugenius IV. In primate John Mey's (Archbishop of Armagh) register, he is alluded to as coarb in 1438.
unknown	1435	Eoin ó Cairbre	died in office
1477	1486	Pilib mac Séamus Mac Mathghamhna	Philip MacMahon son of James; A canon chorister of Clogher, and parson of Dartry he was bound for the annates of the rectory in 1477. He was related to the Kings of Oriel.
1491	1502	Séamus mac Ruaidhri Mac Mathghamhna	James MacMahon son of Rory; A canon of Clogher, who bound himself for the annates in 1491. He was related to the Kings of Oriel. The editor of the Annals of Ulster regards him as being representative of the lay succession of coarbs. This is an unfortunate illustration, for he was certainly a cleric. In 1492 he, the rector of St. Tighernach's, bound himself for the annates of the archdeaconry of Armagh; and in 1502, the year of his death, he, coarb of Clones, was acting as commissary for primate. He was 90 years old when he died.
c.1502	1504	Giolla Pádraig Ó Connálaigh	son of Henry Ua Connalaigh. The abbot of Clones was appointed Bishop-designate of Clogher, 6 March 1504; died before December 1504; also known as Patricius
unknown	1536	Maghnus Mac Mathghamhna	died in office

== See also ==
- List of monastic houses in Ireland
