= Inishkeel =

Irish monastery

Native name: Inis Caoil
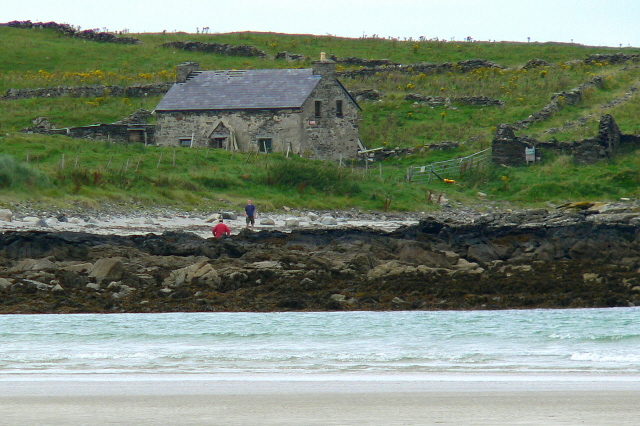
- Building at the south east end of Inishkeel

- Location within island of Ireland

Geography
- Location: Atlantic Ocean
- Coordinates: 54°50′51″N 8°27′22″W
- Area: 0.391 km^{2} (0.151 sq mi)

Administration
- Ireland
- Province: Ulster
- County: Donegal

Demographics
- Population: 0 (2011)

Inishkeel (Irish: Inis Caoil) is a small tidal island and townland off the coast of County Donegal, Ireland. The closest village on the mainland is Narin. The island is in a civil parish of the same name.

== Geography ==
The island is located in Gweebarra Bay around 250 m from the coast. A sandy tidal bank connects, with low tide, the island with the mainland.

== History ==
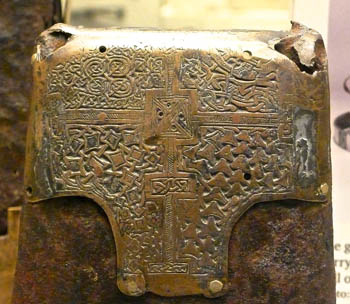
St Conall Cael's Bell

During the 6th century A.D. a small community of monks settled on the island. Their religious leader was Saint Conall Cael, from whom the island later derived its name. During the following centuries Inishkeel was a traditional destination of pilgrimages. Remains of the church and the connected buildings as well as some carved stones can be seen on the island. For its artistical and archeological importance the island was declared National Monument (code: DG064-003). A bell known as St Conall Cael's Bell remained on Inishkeel up to the 19th century and was then acquired by the British Museum.

=== Demography ===
A small community used to live on Inishkeel in the past, and in year 1841 23 inhabitants were registered on the island. The island was later abandoned and in 2011 census had no inhabitants.

== See also ==
Media related to Inishkeel at Wikimedia Commons

- List of islands of Ireland
- List of National Monuments in County Donegal
