= National monument (Ireland) =

Monument assigned national importance in Ireland

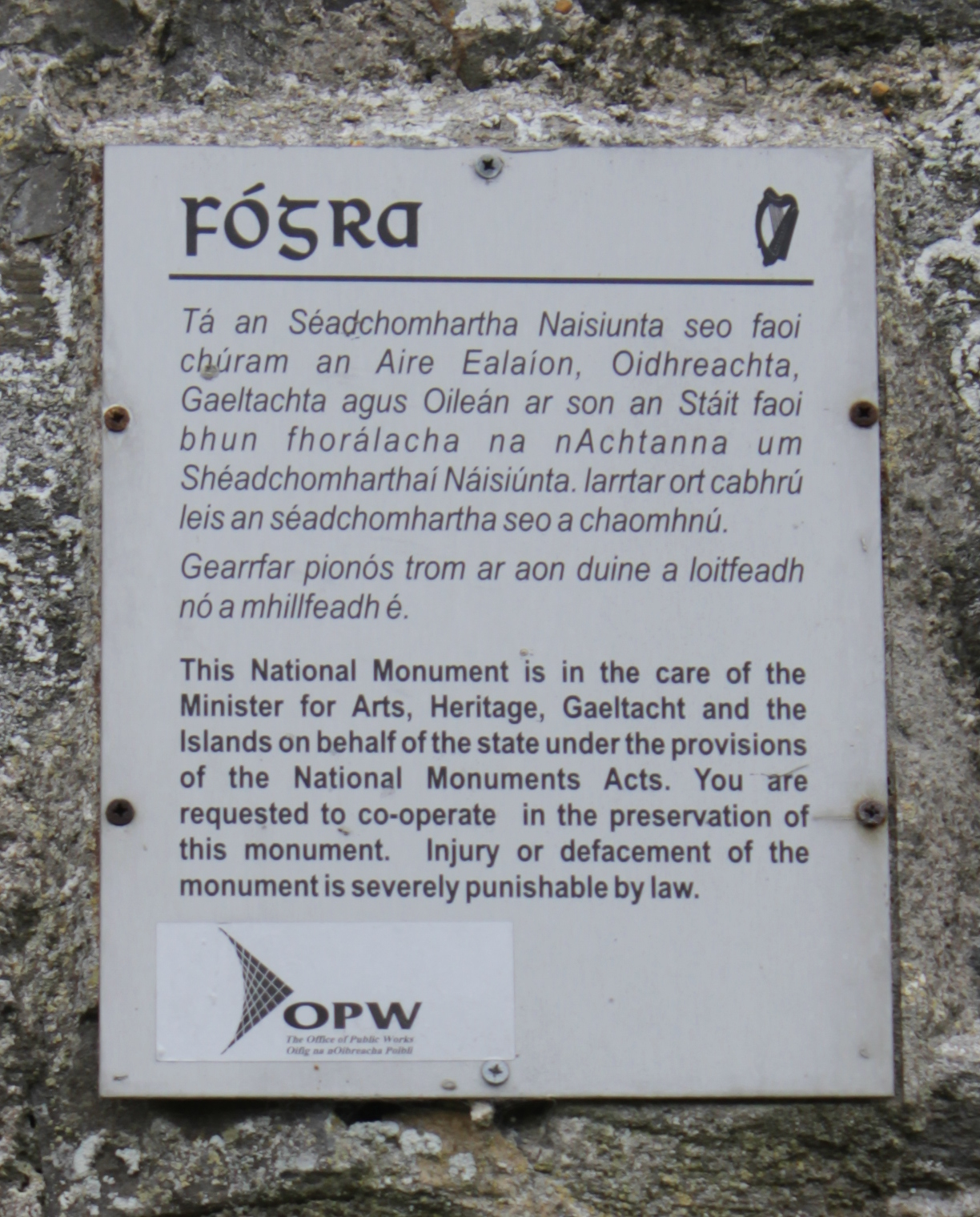
A typical notice (Irish: fógra) at a National Monument. (Note that the current minister responsible is the Minister for Housing, Local Government and Heritage)

A national monument (Irish: séadchomhartha náisiúnta) in Ireland is a structure or site, the preservation of which has been deemed to be of national importance and therefore worthy of state protection. If the land adjoining the monument is essential to protect it, this land may also be protected.

Equivalent monuments in Northern Ireland are listed within the Northern Ireland Sites and Monuments Record and are either in state care or included within the list of scheduled monuments. They are under the protection of the Department for Communities.

== Legal framework for protection ==
National monuments are managed under the auspices of the National Monuments Service, which is part of the Department of Housing, Local Government and Heritage. The official status of national monument is conferred under the National Monuments Acts 1930 to 2014.

Monuments had been protected under the Ancient Monuments Protection Act 1882, an Act of the Parliament of the United Kingdom of Great Britain and Ireland. After the establishment of the Irish Free State in 1922, this framework was reformed by the National Monuments Act 1930. The list of national monuments has since been expanded. By 2010 there were nearly 1,000 monuments in state ownership or guardianship, although this represents only a small proportion of Ireland's recorded archaeological heritage. There are more than 126,000 known sites ['Recorded Monuments'] in Ireland. Each national monument is numbered (for example, the Rock of Cashel is National Monument number 128, Newgrange is number 147), and a numbered monument may represent a group of sites, as is the case at the Rock of Cashel.

A provision of the National Monuments (Amendment) Act 2004 allows for the destruction in whole or in part of a national monument by the Government of Ireland if such destruction is deemed to be in the "public interest". According to press reports, these provisions were included to facilitate road schemes, and in particular the destruction of Carrickmines Castle, a national monument, to build an intersection along the south-eastern section of the M50 motorway.

== World Heritage Sites ==
Two national monuments are also recognised by UNESCO as World Heritage Sites: Brú na Bóinne in County Meath and Skellig Michael in County Kerry.

== List of monuments ==
Province	County	Individual Monuments
Connacht	Galway	88
Munster	Kerry	76
Munster	Limerick	62
Munster	Cork	58
Connacht	Mayo	53
Leinster	Meath	53
Munster	Tipperary	48
Munster	Clare	37
Leinster	Kilkenny	33
Leinster	Dublin	30
Connacht	Sligo	24
Leinster	Wicklow	24
Leinster	Louth	23
Leinster	Wexford	17
Ulster	Donegal	16
Leinster	Kildare	16
Connacht	Roscommon	15
Leinster	Westmeath	15
Leinster	Carlow	14
Munster	Waterford	14
Leinster	Offaly	10
Leinster	Laois	8
Ulster	Cavan	7
Connacht	Leitrim	7
Ulster	Monaghan	7
Leinster	Longford	6
Total	Ireland	761

The following is an index to lists of National Monuments of Ireland, divided by province.

=== Connacht ===
- List of national monuments in County Galway
- List of national monuments in County Leitrim
- List of national monuments in County Mayo
- List of national monuments in County Roscommon
- List of national monuments in County Sligo

=== Leinster ===
- List of national monuments in County Carlow
- List of national monuments in County Dublin
- List of national monuments in County Kildare
- List of national monuments in County Kilkenny
- List of national monuments in County Laois
- List of national monuments in County Longford
- List of national monuments in County Louth
- List of national monuments in County Meath
- List of national monuments in County Offaly
- List of national monuments in County Westmeath
- List of national monuments in County Wexford
- List of national monuments in County Wicklow

=== Munster ===
- List of national monuments in County Clare
- List of national monuments in County Cork
- List of national monuments in County Kerry
- List of national monuments in County Limerick
- List of national monuments in County Tipperary
- List of national monuments in County Waterford

=== Ulster ===
- List of national monuments in County Cavan
- List of national monuments in County Donegal
- List of national monuments in County Monaghan
