= List of heritage sites (Republic of Ireland) =

The Office of Public Works (OPW), together with the National Parks and Wildlife Service of the Department of Culture, Communications and Sport are responsible for the a number of heritage sites of Ireland. They undertake protection and conservation of Ireland's heritage (specifically buildings and historic sites).

The following is a list of Government owned heritage sites in Ireland.

== A-C ==
- Adare Castle – Adare County Limerick – A medieval fortified castle that was an important stronghold of the Earl of Desmond.
- Altamount Gardens – Tullow, County Carlow – Old world garden, Robinsonian in style.
- Ardfert Cathedral – Ardfert, County Kerry – 12th to 17th century Cathedral.
- Athenry Castle – Athenry, County Galway – 13th century, 3-storey tower house
- Aughnanure Castle – Oughterard, County Galway – 16th-century tower house.
- Ballyhack Castle – Ballyhack, County Wexford – 15th-century tower house built by the Knights Hospitallers of St. John
- Barryscourt Castle – Carrigtwohill, County Cork – 15th to 16th century Castle.
- Blasket Center – Dunchaoin, County Kerry – interpretation center for native language, culture and tradition of Blasket Islanders.
- Boyle Abbey – Boyle, County Roscommon – 12th century Cistercian Monastery.
- Brú na Bóinne – Donore, County Meath Neolithic monuments and interpretative centre.
- Cahir Castle – Cahir, County Tipperary
- Carrowmore Megalithic Cemetery – County Sligo Neolithic monuments and interpretative centre.
- Céide Fields – County Mayo – Neolithic field system
- Connemara National Park – County Galway – 20 square kilometre park surrounding the Twelve Bens mountains.
- Coole Park Visitor Centre – Gort, County Galway, Nature reserve, former home of Lady Gregory, one of the founders of the Abbey Theatre
- Corlea Trackway Visitor Centre – Kenagh, County Longford – an Iron Age bog road, dating from 148BC.

== D-K ==
- Derrynane House – Caherdaniel, County Kerry – Ancestral home of Daniel O'Connell.
- Desmond Castle – Kinsale, County Cork – a 16th-century Custom house.
- Desmond Hall – Newcastlewest, County Limerick a 15th-century Castle.
- Donegal Castle – Donegal, County Donegal – a 15th-century Norman tower house with the addition of a 17th-century Jacobean Manor House.
- Doneraile Park – Doneraile, County Cork – an 18th-century landscaped park.
- Dromore Wood – Ennis, County Clare – Nature reserve.
- Dún Aonghasa – Inishmore, Aran Islands, County Galway – A prehistoric stone fort.
- Dungarvan Castle – Dungarvan, County Waterford, Castle with a 12th-century shell keep, with curtain wall, corner tower and gate tower.
- Dunmore Caves – Ballyfoyle, County Kilkenny – limestone cave, site of Viking massacre in 928.
- Dwyer McAllister Cottage – Derrynamuck, County Wicklow – a traditional whitewashed cottage historically linked with the 1798 Rebellion.
- Emo Court – Emo, County Laois – a neo-classical house with extensive parklands
- Ennis Friary – Ennis, County Clare – 13th-century Franciscan Friary.
- Famine Warhouse 1848 – Ballingarry, County Tipperary – site of a skirmish in the Young Irelander Rebellion of 1848
- Ferns Castle – Ferns, County Wexford – 13th-century castle featuring circular chapel, original fireplaces and a vaulted basement.
- Fota Gardens – Fota Island, Carrigtwohill, County Cork – 110,000 square metre park with ornamental pond and Italian walled gardens.
- Gallarus Castle – Ballydavid, County Kerry – a pre 1600 castle on the Dingle Peninsula built by the Knight of Kerry.
- Garnish Island – Bantry, County Cork – Island garden sheltered in Glengarriff harbour.
- Glebe House and Gallery – Churchill, Letterkenny, County Donegal – Regency House.
- Glendalough – Glendalough, County Wicklow – monastic site founded in 6th century, site has a Round Tower, stone churches and multiple stone crosses.
- Glenveagh National Park – Churchill, Letterkenny, County Donegal – 170 square kilometres of mountains, woodland and lakes.
- Heywood Gardens – Ballinakill, County Laois – Formal garden designed by Sir Edwin Lutyens
- Hill of Tara – Navan, County Meath – Seat of the High Kings of Ireland, Pre-Christian center of political and religious power.
- Holy Cross Abbey – Holycross, County Tipperary – 12th century abbey
- Jerpoint Abbey – Thomastown, County Kilkenny – Cistercian monastery.
- John F. Kennedy Arboretum – New Ross, County Wexford – 2.52 square kilometre arboretum dedicated to US President John F. Kennedy.
- Kells Priory – Kells, County Kilkenny
- Kilkenny Castle – Kilkenny, County Kilkenny – castle with extensive parklands.
- Killarney National Park – Killarney, County Kerry – 103 square kilometres of mountains, woodlands including the Lakes of Killarney.
- Kilmacurrage Arboretum – Rathdrum, County Wicklow

== L-Q ==
- Listowel Castle – Listowel, County Kerry – 13th century Castle.
- The Main Guard – Carrick-on-Suir, County Tipperary
- Maynooth Castle – Maynooth, County Kildare – 13th-century Castle.
- Muckross House – Killarney, County Kerry – Victorian House and Cardens located in Killarney National Park.
- Muckross Friary – Killarney, County Kerry – 15th century Franciscan friary.
- Newmills Corn and Flax Mills – Letterkenny, County Donegal – restored industrial buildings powered by watermill on the River Swilly.
- O'Dea Castle – County Clare – a 15th-century castle with high cross and visitor's centre
- Oldbridge Estate – site of Battle of the Boyne
- Old Mellifont Abbey – Tullyallen, Drogheda, County Louth – Ireland's first Cistercian abbey.
- Ormonde Castle – Carrick-on-Suir, County Tipperary – 1560s Elizabethan manor house
- Patrick Pearse's Cottage – County Galway
- Parke's Castle – County Leitrim
- Portumna Castle – Portumna, County Galway

== R-Z ==
- Rathfarnham Castle – Rathfarnham, County Dublin
- Reginald's Tower – Waterford, County Waterford
- Rock of Cashel – Cashel, County Tipperary – traditional seat of the Kings of Munster
- Roscrea Castle – Roscrea, County Tipperary
- Ross Castle – Killarney, County Kerry
- St. Mary's Church – Gowran, County Kilkenny
- Scattery Island Cathedral and Monastery – County Clare – early Christian place of pilgrimage
- Sligo Abbey – Sligo, County Sligo
- Swiss Cottage – Cahir, County Tipperary
- Tintern Abbey – County Wexford – Cistercian abbey
- Trim Castle – Trim, County Meath – Norman castle
- Wexford Wildfowl Reserve – North Slob, County Wexford

== External reference ==
- Heritage Sites of Ireland, Pamphlet, OPW.
