= 1993 in Irish television =

The following is a list of events relating to television in Ireland from 1993.

== Events ==
- 9 January – Three days after its premiere on British television, the BBC children's animated television series The Animals of Farthing Wood begins on RTÉ. It starts off with the series translated into an Irish language titled Cairde Na Coille and airing on RTÉ 1. It is still being shown on Irish television to this very day.
- 12 January – Charlie McCreevy is appointed Minister for Tourism, Transport and Communications with responsibility for broadcasting.
- 21 January – Michael D. Higgins is appointed Minister for Arts, Culture and the Gaeltacht with responsibility for broadcasting.
- 15 May – Ireland hosts and wins the Eurovision Song Contest. The event is presented by Fionnuala Sweeney, from Millstreet, County Cork, while the winning performance is given by Niamh Kavanagh, with a Jimmy Walsh composition, named "In Your Eyes".
- 6 June – The BBC children's animated television series The Animals of Farthing Wood begins airing on Irish television screens in English for the very first time ever on RTÉ 1.
- 30 June – The Broadcasting Authority (Amendment) Act 1993 comes into law. The legislation concerns the production of independent television programmes.
- 25 September – Mary Mulcahy presents a brand new Saturday morning wrapper programme for children called Our House. Screening on Network 2, it plays host to many programmes, including the Irish dubbed version of The Animals of Farthing Wood, a new series of the puppet series The Rimini Riddle, and for first time on Irish television, the 1960s puppetry television series Captain Scarlet and the Mysterons, which was previously available to those who could receive UTV or HTV Wales.
- 16 December – Postman Pat returns to air on Irish television for a second time on Network 2 and continues to run until 10 March 1994.
- Undated – RTÉ establishes an Independent Production Unit as part of its response to the Broadcasting Authority (Amendment) Act.

== Debuts ==
=== RTÉ 1 ===
- 9 January – The Animals of Farthing Wood (1993–1995)
- 18 June – Lifelines (1993–1996)
- 30 September – Art Attacks (1993)
- 2 October – Ryantown (1993–1994)
- 24 October – Nationwide (1993–present)
- 3 November – Extra! Extra! Read All About It! (1993)
- 29 December – Prince Cinders (1993)

=== Network 2 ===
- 4 January – Timberwood Tales (1991)
- 5 January – Batman: The Animated Series (1992–1995)
- 16 February – Halfway Across the Galaxy and Turn Left (1994–1995)
- 5 April – Taz-Mania (1991–1995)
- 12 April – The Bear's Island (1992)
- 15 April – Ramona (1988)
- 15 April – Funnybones (1992)
- 17 April – A Bunch of Munsch (1991–1992)
- 21 April – Dirty Rat Tales (1990)
- 13 May – The Legend of White Fang (1992–1994)
- 13 May – Madeline in London (1991)
- 14 June – Rosie and Jim (1990–2000)
- 5 July – The Adventures of Tintin (1991–1993)
- 9 July – Kideo (1993–1994)
- September – The End (1993–1995)
- 13 September – Tír na hÓige (1993–1994)
- 15 September – Juniper Jungle (1992–1993)
- 16 September – The Brollys (1990)
- 24 September – The New Adventures of Shoe People (1992)
- 25 September – Captain Scarlet and the Mysterons (1967–1968)
- 25 September – Our House (1993–1994)
- 7 October – The Movie Show (1993–2001)
- 22 October – Sandokan (1992)
- 31 October – Dungeons and Dragons (1983-1985)
- 23 November – Back to the Future (1991–1992)
- 6 December – Brum (1991–1994, 2001–2002)
- 25 December – A Cosmic Christmas (1977)
- 31 December – Sesame Street Celebrates Around the World (1993)
- Undated – No Disco (1993–2003)
- Undated – Melrose Place (1992–1999)
- Undated – Forever Knight (1992–1996)

=== UTV ===
- 4 January – UTV Live (1993–present)

== Changes of network affiliation ==
Shows	Moved from	Moved to
Count Duckula	Network 2	RTÉ 1
Butterfly Island	RTÉ1	Network 2
Babar	Network 2	RTÉ 1
The Animals of Farthing Wood	RTÉ1	Network 2
ThunderCats	Network 2	RTÉ 1
A Little Princess	RTÉ 1	Network 2
Jayce And The Wheeled Warriors	Network 2	RTÉ 1
Babar and Father Christmas	RTÉ 1	Network 2

== Ongoing television programmes ==
=== 1960s ===
- RTÉ News: Nine O'Clock (1961–present)
- RTÉ News: Six One (1962–present)
- The Late Late Show (1962–present)

=== 1970s ===
- Sports Stadium (1973–1997)
- The Late Late Toy Show (1975–present)
- RTÉ News on Two (1978–2014)
- Bosco (1979–1996)
- The Sunday Game (1979–present)

=== 1980s ===
- Mailbag (1982–1996)
- Glenroe (1983–2001)
- Live at 3 (1986–1997)
- Saturday Live (1986–1999)
- Questions and Answers (1986–2009)
- Dempsey's Den (1986–2010)
- Marketplace (1987–1996)
- Where in the World? (1987–1996)
- Know Your Sport (1987–1998)
- Kenny Live (1988–1999)
- Fair City (1989–present)
- RTÉ News: One O'Clock (1989–present)

=== 1990s ===
- Would You Believe (1990s–present)
- Winning Streak (1990–present)
- Blackboard Jungle (1991–1997)
- Challenging Times (1991–2001)
- Prime Time (1992–present)

== Ending this year ==
- 20 March – Secrets (1990–1993)
- June – Jo Maxi (1988–1993)
- 22 December – Extra! Extra! Read All About It! (1993)

== See also ==
- 1993 in Ireland
