= Rough Magic (theatre company) =

Dublin theatrical company

Rough Magic is a Dublin-based theatre production company, producing a range of theatre across three strands; new Irish writing, reimagined classics, and major contemporary international work. They play to Irish audiences and tour internationally. The company is involved in artist development, through commissions, mentoring and initiatives such as the SEEDS programme for emerging theatre practitioners.

Since its foundation, Rough Magic has produced 149 productions, including 46 World premieres and 26 Irish premieres.

== History ==
Rough Magic was established in 1984 as an ensemble comprising recent graduates from Trinity College Dublin and University College Dublin. The founder members were Siobhan Bourke, Anne Byrne, Declan Hughes, Helene Montague, Lynne Parker, Arthur Riordan and Stanley Townsend; the first season ran in Players Theatre, Trinty College Dublin. The company received grant funding from The Arts Council within the first year and formed a longstanding relationship with Project Arts Centre where much of its work has been produced.

The Rough Magic archive was donated to the Library of Trinity College Dublin in 2017 and the company founded a joint Fellowship with the Trinity Long Room Hub in 2024.

Rough Magic began commissioning writers in the 1990s with I Can’t Get Started by Declan Hughes. The company has commissioned and produced new plays from writers such as Donal O'Kelly, Gina Moxley, Morna Regan, Elizabeth Kuti, Hilary Fannin, and Arthur Riordan. Writers currently under commission include Marina Carr, Peter Daly, James McAleavey and Shane Mac an Bhaird.

In recent years the company has forged partnerships with festivals and venues to co-produce work around Ireland, including Kilkenny Arts Festival, Lime Tree Theatre Limerick, the Abbey Theatre, Gate Theatre Dublin and Theatre Royal Waterford.

Rough Magic has toured to the UK, United States, France, Finland, Poland, Germany, Macedonia, Australia and New Zealand.

== Artist development ==
The company established the SEEDS programme for emerging artists in 2001. Initially a programme for writers, it was expanded to include directors, designers, producers and production managers. In 2025 the programme evolved to support emerging companies or collectives. The company also ran ADVANCE, a parallel programme for established and mid-career theatre practitioners from 2014 – 17.

Of the 50+ artists who have completed the SEEDS programme 80% are working full-time in professional theatre and 60% have been employed professionally by Rough Magic.

== Notable productions ==
- Talbot’s Box by Thomas Kilroy was the first main production in 1984. Directed by Declan Hughes, designed by Lynne Parker, featuring Darragh Kelly, Anne Byrne, Helene Montague, Stanley Townsend and Arthur Riordan. Produced by Siobhan Bourke.
- Top Girls by Caryl Churchill 1984. Irish premiere directed by Lynne Parker. Featuring Anne Byrne, Rosemary Fine, Anne Enright, Pauline McLynn, Lucy Vigne Welsh, Veronica Coburn.
- The Caucasian Chalk Circle by Bertolt Brecht in a new adaptation by Declan Hughes. Dublin Theatre Festival 1985.
- Digging for Fire by Declan Hughes, world premiere, 1991. Transferred to the Bush Theatre, London. Winner of the Stewart Parker Bursary and the London Time Out Award. Commissioned by Rough Magic.
- Pentecost by Stewart Parker 1995. Winner of the Dublin Theatre Festival award for Best Irish Production. Transferred to the Donmar Warehouse 1996, Kennedy Center Washington 2000.
- Danti-Dan by Gina Moxley, world premiere, 1995. Winner of the Stewart Parker Bursary. Transferred to the Hampstead Theatre London. Commissioned by Rough Magic.
- Copenhagen by Michael Frayn, Irish premiere, 2002. Starring Owen Roe, Declan Conlon and Ingrid Craigie. Winner of the Irish Times Theatre Award for Best Production 2002.
- Improbable Frequency, a world premiere of a new musical by Arthur Riordan and Bell Helicopter premiered in 2004 winning the Irish Times Theatre Award for Best Production and touring to Edinburgh, Poland and New York. Commissioned by Rough Magic.
- The Sugar Wife by Elizabeth Kuti, world premiere, 2005. Winner of the Susan Smith Blackburn Prize. Transferred to Soho Theatre London. Commissioned by Rough Magic.
- The Taming of the Shrew by William Shakespeare, 2006. Starring Pauline McLynn and Owen Roe. Winner of the Irish Times Theatre Award for Best Production.
- Don Carlos by Friedrich Schiller, translated by Mike Poulton, 2007. Starring Rory Keenan, Nick Dunning, Kathy Kiera Clarke, Simone Kirby and Fergal McElherron. Winner of the Irish Times Theatre Award for Best Production.
- Racine's Phaedra adapted by Hilary Fannin and Ellen Cranitch, world premiere 2010. Starring Catherine Walker, Allen Leech, Sarah Greene and Stephen Brennan. Commissioned by Rough Magic.
- The Importance of Being Earnest by Oscar Wilde, 2010. Starring Stockard Channing, Rory Nolan, Rory Keenan, Aoife Duffin and Gemma Reeves.
- How to Keep an Alien by Sonya Kelly, 2014. World premiere. Toured to London Soho, Edinburgh Traverse, Australia, Finland, Irish Arts Center New York.
- Hecuba by Marina Carr, Irish premiere, 2019. Starring Aislín McGuckin and Brian Doherty. A film version of Hecuba made in 2020 during the Covid-19 pandemic was released in cinemas across Ireland in 2022.
- Solar Bones by Mike McCormack in an adaptation by Michael West, world premiere, 2020. A co-production with Kilkenny Arts Festival. Starring Stanley Townsend.
- The Loved Ones by Erica Murray, world premiere, 2023. A co-production with The Gate Theatre. Commissioned by Rough Magic.
- What Are You Afraid Of? by Peter Hanly. Co-produced with Kilkenny Arts Festival 2025.

== Awards ==
Awards include a record number of four The Irish Times Irish Theatre Awards for Best Production; London Time Out Award; two Edinburgh Fringe First Awards and the Irish Times Theatre Award for Best Ensemble for A Midsummer Night’s Dream. Most recently Rough Magic's production of Solar Bones won Best Actor for Stanley Townsend and Best Director for Lynne Parker at the Irish Times Theatre Awards.
