= Patsy Dan Rodgers =

- King of Tory
- Rodgers in 2004
- Predecessor: Padraig Óg Rodgers
- Successor: Vacant
- Born: Patsaí Dan Mag Ruaidhrí; 1944; Westland Row, Dublin, Ireland
- Died: 19 October 2018 (aged 73–74); Mater Hospital, Dublin, Ireland
- Wife: Caitlin
- Issue: Breda; Majella; Christina; Sean
Era dates
- 1990s–2018
- Occupation: Musician-painter-ambassador

Patsy Dan Rodgers (Patsaí Dan Mag Ruaidhrí) was a painter, musician, and the King of Tory from the 1990s until his death in 2018.

== Biography ==
Rodgers was born in 1944 on Westland Row, Dublin. His family adopted him and took him to Tory when he was about four years of age. His paintings have been exhibited worldwide. As a youth Derek Hill had personally inspired him to paint during Hill's visits to Tory, and he was also devoted to music and his native language. The musical instrument with which he was most associated was the button accordion. He often sported a black seafarer's cap.

During the 1970s and 1980s, he steadfastly opposed the relocation of Tory's inhabitants to the Irish mainland. The Kingship of Tory was granted him during the 1990s when the children of his predecessor, Padraig Óg Rodgers, endorsed him for the position, and for more than two decades Rodgers often personally welcomed visitors arriving in Tory in his native tongue. He also performed ambassadorial duties when abroad. While visiting nearby in May 2016, Charles III expressed the wish to one day visit Tory and meet Rodgers, but he never did.

In 1997, Rodgers received an honorary master's degree from the University of Ulster.

Rodgers resided at West Town. He died on 19 October 2018 in the Mater Hospital in Dublin at the age of 74. His remains were flown back to Tory, where he was buried following a funeral ceremony attended by various dignitaries from neighbouring lands.

Rodgers was survived by his three daughters, one son, and two grandchildren.
