= Hilary Fannin =

Irish writer and actress

- Born: 1962 (age 63–64); Dublin, Ireland
- Education: M. Phil. Trinity College Dublin
- Occupations: Writer, playwright, novelist
- Known for: Exploring the plight of creative Irish women in a faltering patriarchy
- Notable work: Doldrum Bay (Play); Phaedra (Play); Hopscotch (Memoir); Weight of Love (Novel)

Hilary Fannin (born 1962) is an Irish writer, playwright and actress. She is best known for her awarding winning weekly column Fiftysomething in the Irish Times. A founding member of Wet Paint Theatre she worked as an actress for much of the 1980s and 1990s. Her first play Mackerel Sky was performed at the Bush Theatre (1997). Her second, Sleeping Around, co-written with Mark Ravenhill, Abi Morgan and Stephen Greenhorn, was produced by Paines Plough and premiered at the Donmar Warehouse London (1998). Her third play, Doldrum Bay, debuted in the Peacock Theatre (2003); and in 2004 she was appointed joint writer-in-association (with Mark O'Rowe) at the Abbey Theatre for its centenary year. Her two most recent plays, an adaptation of Racine’s Phaedra (2010) and Famished Castle (2015) were produced by Rough Magic. Her radio dramas Dear Exile (2001) and Red Feathers (2002) have been broadcast by the BBC. A memoir Hopscotch (2015) and a first novel The Weight of Love (2020) were both published by Doubleday Ireland. She is married to the journalist Giles Newington and has two children.

== Life ==
The youngest of four children Fannin was born in Dublin in 1962; she has one brother Robert, and two sisters Laura and Valerie. Her parents met in the National College of Art and Design, however her mother Marie, left to pursue a career in musical theatre; becoming a much admired drama teacher later in life. Her father Robert (Bob) Fannin previously head of studio at McConnells, turned to cartooning in order to spend more time sailing and his drawings have appeared in publications such as the Irish Field, Business and Finance, and the Evening Herald. Charismatic but unfaithful, her father spent most of his time ‘lining up pints’ in the Howth Yacht Club and ‘evading the debt collectors’; as a result domestic life was turbulent both financially and emotionally, ‘My parents didn't do suburbia very well, because they were artists themselves and it didn't suit them. That led to a lot of complications.’ These complications came to a head when the family was forcibly evicted from their home, ‘My mother was 45 years old when the bailiffs came, the house fell apart, the affair was revealed’; at the same time Fannin was forced to leave her primary school, and childhood friendships, because the family were no longer able to afford the fees. Isolated and alone in a rented holiday cottage she recalls cutting the paper dolls from her mother's dressmaking catalogues saying, ‘I populated every shelf with paper people, gave each of them names and occupations, imbued the limbless with tragic backstories and valiant deeds, while the elegant, well-drawn and fully realised ones were given dire personal problems’ (Fannin, 2021). This imaginative play was to have a formative influence on her career, recollecting later that ‘it was a crucial part of my development as a writer.’

== Education ==
She was educated at Santa Sabina Dominican Convent in Sutton and left school in 1979 saying that ‘there was no free education. My parents were broke I didn’t come from that kind of stable environment. I was very weak academically and I barely got a Leaving Cert. College was not an option for me’. However she returned to education and in 2018 she graduated with an M.Phil. in Creative Writing from the Oscar Wilde Centre, Trinity College Dublin. Since then Fannin has co-created and mentored a playwriting initiative for teenagers conducted jointly with Fighting Words and the Abbey Theatre.

== Acting ==
She was a founding member of Wet Paint Theatre (1984 – 1991), a Dublin-based company that worked closely with Comhairle le Leas Óige (Dublin Youth Services Council) and whose ambition was ‘the development of young people’s access to and participation in the arts.' Participants, including the actors Owen Roe and Gina Moxley, were funded primarily through government employment initiatives such as Teamwork or the Social Employment Scheme; however certain productions were funded directly by the Arts Council. In 1993 she had a small role in the ill-fated television comedy Extra! Extra! Read all About It!, a series so bad the columnist and author Colm Tóibín declared it ‘probably the worst programme RTÉ has ever shown.’ Two years later she returned to television as the bourgeois neighbour Pamela Moriarty, in the series Upwardly Mobile. Faring little better critically than Extra, Extra it ran for three seasons and, crucially, gave her the financial space to begin writing her first play, ‘I got cast in a few bits and pieces of TV over the years and that was such a relief as I was very often broke.’

== Writing ==
Reflecting on her career in acting she says: ‘I think acting gives people up – I don’t know if people give up acting ... As a female of a certain age there is a dearth of work.’ However the time spent rehearsing plays by Tom MacIntyre, Dermot Bolger and Michael Harding in the Peacock Theatre inspired her to do more than just appear on stage, ‘I was in the room when they were building plays; when they were writing. Theatre’s very collaborative, and I became very fascinated with that process. And then eventually I started writing myself.’ Motifs from her childhood are frequently revisited and reconfigured in her work, but as a writer Fannin is primarily interested in ‘her generation of Irish women ... those who tried to push beyond the limitations of patriarchy but who get caught up anyway in the aspic of domesticity, childbirth and financial dependency.’ Her plays are full of ideas but a recurring criticism is that her characters seem to function as vehicles for sharply written, often cutting commentary at the expense of dramatic cohesion – in a review of Famished Castle, Peter Crawley remarks that her protagonists have a tendency to be ‘depthless ciphers, delivering interchangeably lofty remarks.’

=== Theatre ===
Mackerel Sky (Bush Theatre, 1997). A comedy of familial dysfunction, the play takes place in a Dublin seaside village where the Brazil family nervously await the arrival of the bailiffs. Abandoned by their seafaring father, glamorous mother Mamie, is trying to revive her career as a singer in order to make ends meet. Youngest daughter Stephanie is in thrall to the nuns; while older sister Madeleine has managed to secure a six-month supply of the contraceptive pill in exchange for a fiver and a pair of turquoise hot pants; and only brother Jack is at sea both literally and metaphorically. Meanwhile, gun-toting grandmother Tom, embittered, and suffering from dementia, is preparing for an armed stand-off. Set in 1970's ‘Catholic Ireland’ the play gives a defiant two fingers to conformity; where the easy way out is avoided at all costs.

Receiving its Irish Premiere with Waterford's Red Kettle Theatre Company in 1999, the reviews were modest: ‘The play is well worth seeing and is the first attempt at theatre by someone who obviously has a talent and a feel for words’ ‘Hilary Fannin’s first play abounds with promise unfulfilled in its brief 90 minutes. Bristling with ideas, it splutters with glib domestic comedy.’

Sleeping Around (Paines Plough, 1998). An explicit reimagining of Arthur Schnitzler’s La Ronde (Reigen) the play was co-written with Mark Ravenhill, Abi Morgan and Stephen Greenhorn. Unlike Schnitzler, who sought to dissect society by examining a series of sexual encounters as they happen across the social classes, Sleeping Around is much more concerned with ‘the deeply human need to connect with others.’

Reviews in the British press fixated on the fragmented nature of the piece, however Rude Guerrilla's 2002 production in California was met with almost universal acclaim, with the LA Times claiming, ‘Like David Hare’s 1998 counterpart The Blue Room, Sleeping Around charts a coital round robin with each new partner carrying forward to the next coupling, coming full circle by the finale. Unlike Blue Room, however Sleeping probes the emotional recesses of its characters, harvesting more humour and sexual voltage than Hare’s socioeconomic emphasis achieved.’

Doldrum Bay (Peacock Theatre, 2003). Four characters drift aimlessly through their middle class privilege. Magda is conflicted by imminent death of her terminally ill artist father – the man whose infidelities have led to her mother's suicide. Her husband Francis has quit his job in advertising to write a great Irish novel but seems more concerned with picking up impressionable young millennials. Chick, his friend and former colleague, now exposed by Francis's absence from the agency, has one last chance to redeem himself with a campaign to rebrand the Christian Brothers in seven words. While Louise, Chick's overly medicated wife, realises that an unexpected pregnancy can bring new meaning to her life.

Undoubtedly ambitious, reviews for the play were mixed: ‘It's meandering, pretentious, disconnected, and presumably intended as a satire on modern Irish mores’; ‘Fannin doesn’t manage to tie up all the themes and ideas she packs into the play, but she has written compelling characters and some wonderfully entertaining comic dialogue’; ‘The wit is barbed and cuts deep ... it’s refreshing to come across a play that isn’t afraid to put the boot into Ireland’s clerical past.’ This willingness to confront Ireland's religious history could still provoke hostility – annoyed by the anti-Catholic subtext, a member of the audience at a post-reading discussion in 2002 told the author that he hoped the play would ‘sink without trace.’ As an interrogation of male angst during the economic ‘boom years’ the play has also attracted academic interest: Prof. Brian Singleton of Trinity College Dublin commenting that ‘Fannin here, presents a world in which male authority is at the point of collapse. And she permits it to collapse, but not as a spectacle that might further embolden and resurrect its authority. This authority simply disappears.’

Phaedra (Rough Magic, 2010) was a collaboration between Fannin and the composer Ellen Cranitch. A darkly witty reworking of Racine’s Phèdre set in a financially buoyant Ireland that has become both cynical and corrupt; a place where wealth is now valued above integrity and where women have become hyper-sexualised. Phaedra has only married Theseus, a bullying tycoon, for money and influence; and stepson Hippolytus, the true object of her affection, is as much a victim for his lack of material interest as he is of the vindictiveness of those around him.

The play opened at the Project Arts Centre as part of the Dublin Theatre Festival and the production was met with widespread acclaim: ‘The line-by-line writing in Hilary Fannin’s script is wonderful: irreverent, deliciously bawdy and bang up to date'; ‘The storyline is ancient Greek, but the dialogue sizzles with crude but funny one-liners.’ Hoping it would be picked up by a British company, Michael Billington described it as an ‘utterly compelling piece about today’s Ireland. This it became clear, was a society in which ... the ostentatious wealth of the “Celtic Tiger” years proved no more than a hollow sham.’

The Famished Castle (Rough Magic, 2015). Considered Fannin's least successful work it sees Nat and Angie, former lovers who meet in a snowbound airport, briefly rekindle their romance. Taking place after the economic crash, key moments from their relationship are revisited in a series of tableau – including an outlandish centrepiece in a seafood restaurant with Nat's warring parents, in which old traumas are served up alongside the main course.

Ridiculed for their lack of chemistry, one critic described the two leads as, ‘The most boring couple to have ever ripped each other’s clothes off at the theatre.’ More damningly though was that the play was considered underdeveloped and incoherent: ‘It is abysmally constructed, its plotline and motivation are indiscernible, and its characters are plastic cut-outs'; ‘The writing is often sharp and the plot never less than interesting. However, some awkwardly-written timeline changes disturb the flow of the narrative.’

=== Fiction and Non-fiction ===
Her memoir Hopscotch was published by Doubleday Ireland in 2015 – writing in the Irish Times Carlo Gébler praised its ability to tell a ‘private story with candour and exactitude, love and understanding, artfulness and wit.’ In 2020 Doubleday also published her first novel The Weight of Love.

== Publications ==
- Mackerel Sky - The Bush Theatre Book ed. Mike Bradwell, Methuen, 1997
- Sleeping Around, Bloomsbury, 1998
- Doldrum Bay, Methuen, 2003
- Hopscotch, Doubleday Ireland, 2015
- Phaedra - Rough Magic Theatre Company: New Irish Plays and Adaptations 2010-2018 ed. Patrick Lonergan, Methuen, 2020
- The Weight of Love, Doubleday Ireland, 2020
