= Kings of Tory =

Irish customary title

King of Tory
- Rí Thoraigh (Irish)
- Incumbent; Vacant since 19 October 2018
- Residence: Tory Island

Patsaí Dan Mac Ruaidhrí, King until his death on 19 October 2018

The king of Tory (Irish: Rí Thoraí) is a customary title used by inhabitants of the island of Tory off the coast of County Donegal, Ireland. The title is vacant, and last claimed by Dublin-born Patsy Dan Rodgers (Irish: Patsaí Dan Mac Ruaidhrí), who died of cancer in Dublin in October 2018.

== History ==
The history of the kings dates to at least the 6th century, and possibly significantly earlier. It has been suggested that some of the pre-historical kings included Conand and Balor. During the 19th century, the Heggerty/Heraghty/Herrity family supplied the kings; however, the role of king is no longer hereditary. The role usually entails being a representative for the island to outsiders. In 1995, it was reported that the then king personally greeted every incoming ferry from the mainland.

According to Tourism Ireland in 2012, Tory Island was the "only place in Ireland to have a [customary] King".

Patsy Dan Rodgers became King of Tory in 1993, and held the title and role until his death in October 2018. Rodgers was an artist and musician and in his role as king welcomed visitors to the island, entertained them with music and tales of island life. He was born in Dublin in 1944 and only adopted into Tory when he was four, but the Rodgers family claims a historic connection to the island, and the holder of the title prior to Patsy Dan Rodgers was Padraig Óg Rodgers.

There is little documentation of earlier kings; a 1917 issue of The Literary Digest mentioned that "The shores are inhabited by septs […] which preserve a clannish allegiance to one another, but the islands are ruled by kings. There is a King of Tory and a King of Innismurray". A dwarf named Paddy Heggarty was another king prior to the Rodgers. Kings were required to be of the brehon class and to be literate.
