= Gina Moxley =

Irish playwright, director and actress

- Born: 1957 (age 68–69); Cork, Ireland
- Education: Crawford School of Art; Trinity College Dublin
- Occupations: playwright, actress, author
- Writing career
- Language: English
- Years active: 1995–present
- Period: 1995–present
- Subjects: feminism, childhood
- Notable works: Danti-Dan; Dog House; The Patient Gloria
- Notable awards: Stewart Parker Trust Award (1996)

Gina Moxley (born 1957) is an Irish playwright, director, author and actress. She is a member of Aosdána, an Irish association of artists.

== Early life ==
Moxley was born in Cork in 1957.

== Career ==
Moxley studied fine art at Crawford School of Art. She applied for a job as a designer with a theatre company in Dublin, who then invited her to audition to act instead.

Her debut play, Danti-Dan (1995) was commissioned by Rough Magic and won the Stewart Parker Trust Award. In 1996, she contributed the idea for the film Snakes and Ladders and also co-starred in it (alongside Pom Boyd) as one of the female leads. In 1997 she followed her debut play with Dog House, a one-actor drama about the abuse of a teenager.

Moxley attended the creative writing course at the Oscar Wilde Centre and received an M.Phil. from Trinity College Dublin in 2006.

In 2014, How to Keep an Alien won best production at the 2014 Dublin Fringe Festival.

In 2018, her play The Patient Gloria, based on the 1965 film Three Approaches to Psychotherapy, was staged at the Abbey Theatre. At the 2019 Edinburgh Festival Fringe she won Fringe First and Herald Angel awards for the play.

As an actress, she has mostly appeared on stage, but has also appeared on several films and TV shows produced in Ireland, including Game of Thrones, The Butcher Boy, Titanic: Blood and Steel, This Is My Father and Moll Flanders (1996). She has also written radio plays and short stories, and contributed a chapter to the serial novel Yeats is Dead!.

Moxley was elected to Aosdána in 2020.

== Personal life ==
Moxley lives in Kilmainham, Dublin.
