= Gallarus Castle =

Tower house in County Kerry, Ireland

- Contae Chiarraí; Near Dingle/An Daingean in Ireland
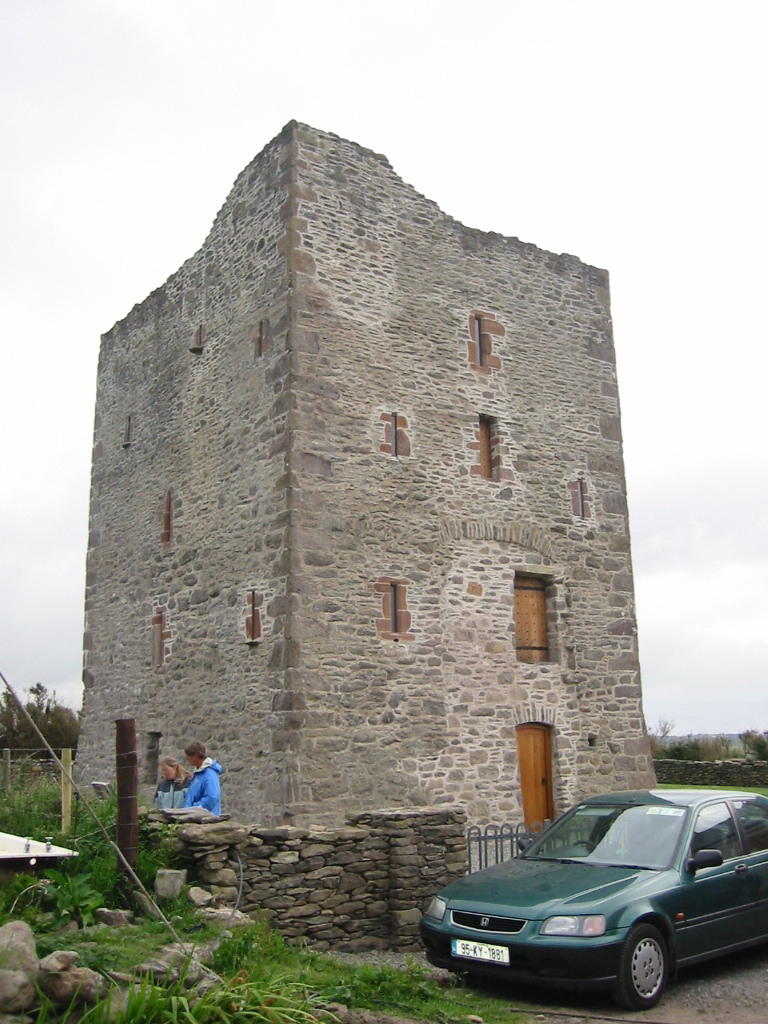
- Gallarus Castle

Site information
- Type: Tower house
- Owner: Knight of Kerry
- Condition: restored

Location
- Coordinates: 52°10′33″N 10°21′21″W
- Height: 4 storeys

Site history
- Built: 15th century

Gallarus Castle is a four-storey rectangular tower house in Baile na nGall, County Kerry, Ireland and is notable as one of the few fortified structures preserved on the Dingle Peninsula.

== History ==
Gallarus Castle was built in the 15th century by the Knight of Kerry, the holder of a hereditary knighthood belonging to the Geraldine Dynasty. It is now an Irish heritage site.

The building has been extensively restored and a new rectangular doorway inserted in the north wall. There is no evidence of a stone stairway below the second floor. A mural stairway rises in the east wall and the ceilings on the third and fourth floor are vaulted.

Gallarus Castle stands about 1 kilometre (0.62 mi) away from the better known and more historically significant Gallarus Oratory.

== Sources ==
- Anonymous (1846). The Parliamentary Gazetteer of Ireland. Vol. 2. Dublin: A. Fullarton. – D to M (for Gallerus)
