= Ballydavid =

Village in County Kerry, Ireland

Ballydavid Baile na nGall
- Village
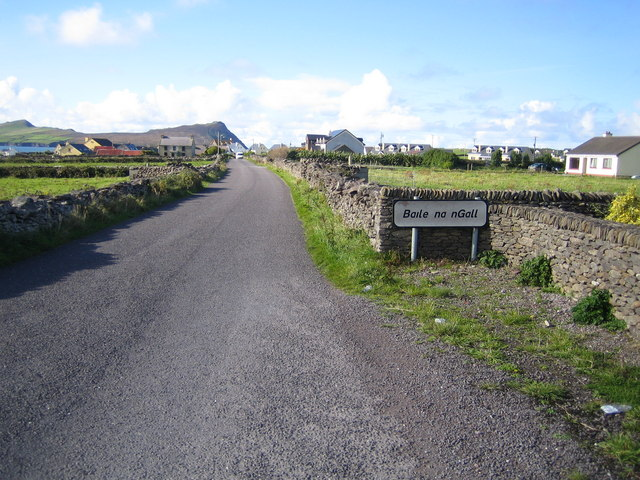

- Location in Ireland
- Coordinates: 52°13′12″N 10°21′39″W
- Country: Ireland
- Province: Munster
- County: County Kerry
- Official name: Baile na nGall.

Baile na nGall (Irish, meaning "town of the foreigners), unofficially anglicized as "Ballydavid", is a Gaeltacht village is situated on the Dingle Peninsula of County Kerry, Ireland. As the 2003 Official Languages Act revoked the status of the English language name Ballydavid, the official name is Baile na nGall.

The village is near to Gallarus Castle, a 15th-century tower built by the Knight of Kerry, the holder of a hereditary knighthood belonging to the Geraldine Dynasty. It is now an Irish heritage site and stands about one kilometre from the better known and more historically significant Gallarus Oratory.

RTÉ Raidió na Gaeltachta has a broadcast studio just outside the village. The radio tower is also a transmission site for RTÉ Network Limited.

The Marilyn, Ballydavid Head, has a relative height of 247 metres.

== See also ==
- List of towns and villages in Ireland

== Sources ==
- Anonymous (1846). The Parliamentary Gazetteer of Ireland. Vol. 2. Dublin: A. Fullarton. – D to M (for Gallerus)
