= Glebe Gallery =

Gallery with gardens in County Donegal, Ireland

Coordinates: 55.001495°N 7.898838°W

Glebe House and Gallery
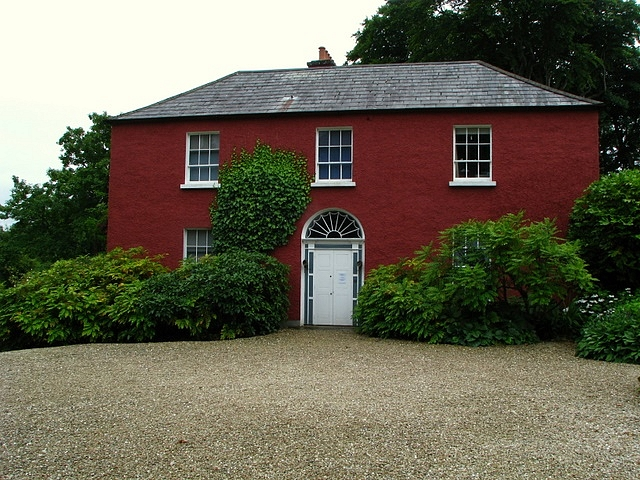

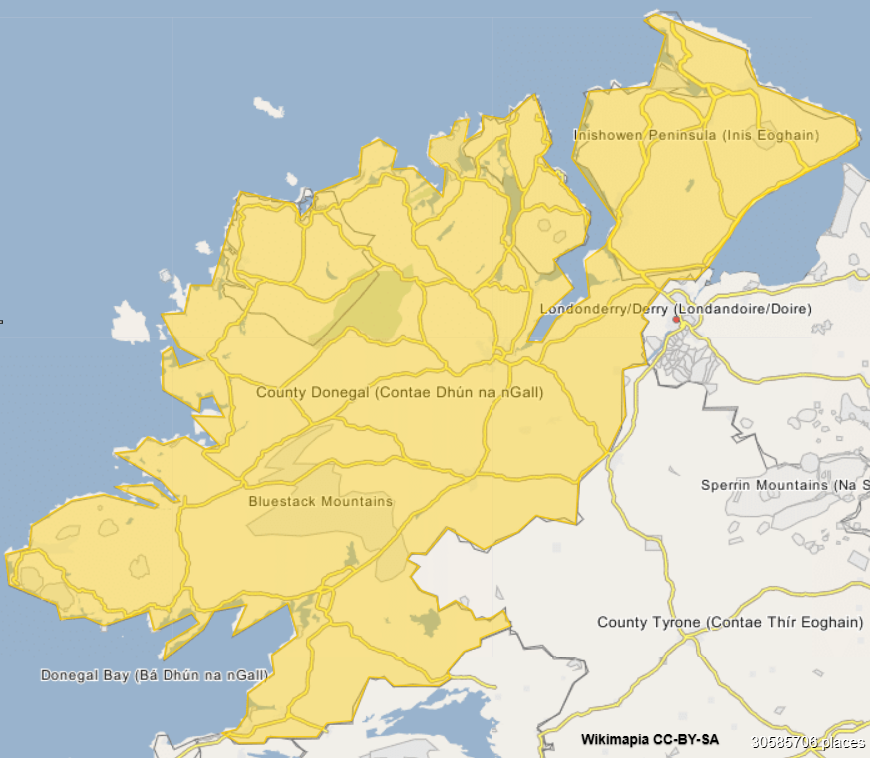
- Location within Ireland Glebe Gallery (County Donegal)
- Former names: St Columb’s
- Alternative names: Derek Hill House

General information
- Location: Glebe, Church Hill, County Donegal, F92 WP70, Letterkenny, Ireland
- Opened: 1828; 198 years ago
- Owner: Office of Public Works

Design and construction
- Known for: House of Derek Hill

Glebe House and Glebe Gallery are located just outside the town of Letterkenny near Churchill. The house was built in 1828. The English portrait and landscape painter Derek Hill lived and worked there from 1954 until he presented the house and his art collection to the Irish state in 1982. Hill's former studio has been converted into a modern gallery with changing exhibitions while his art collection is shown in his former home together with European and oriental furniture and William Morris wallpapers and fabrics. The collection includes works by Pablo Picasso, Georges Braque, Louis le Brocquy, Graham Sutherland, Auguste Renoir, Jack Butler Yeats, Oskar Kokoschka, Patrick Swift and the native Tory Island painter, James Dixon.

Run by the Office of Public Works the gallery is open for a limited season each year - around Easter and then from June to the end of September. Access to the permanent collection in Glebe House is by guided tour only. The woodland gardens, which border Lough Gartan, are open all year round.

In May 2023, an outdoor classroom for the local Gartan National School to interact with arts, culture and nature in a holistic manner, was opened on the premises.

In July 2024 it attained full-accreditation from the Heritage Council’s Museum Standards Programme for Ireland for maintaining its mark of excellence. In September that year, the gallery and house both closed to facilitate conservation works; and in November it received a green flag award for sustainability in its parks and green spaces.

In January 2025, the gallery was re-opened when conservation work finished, with the house remaining closed until conservation works there finish in the summer.
