= St Andrew's Church, Westland Row, Dublin =

St. Andrew's Church
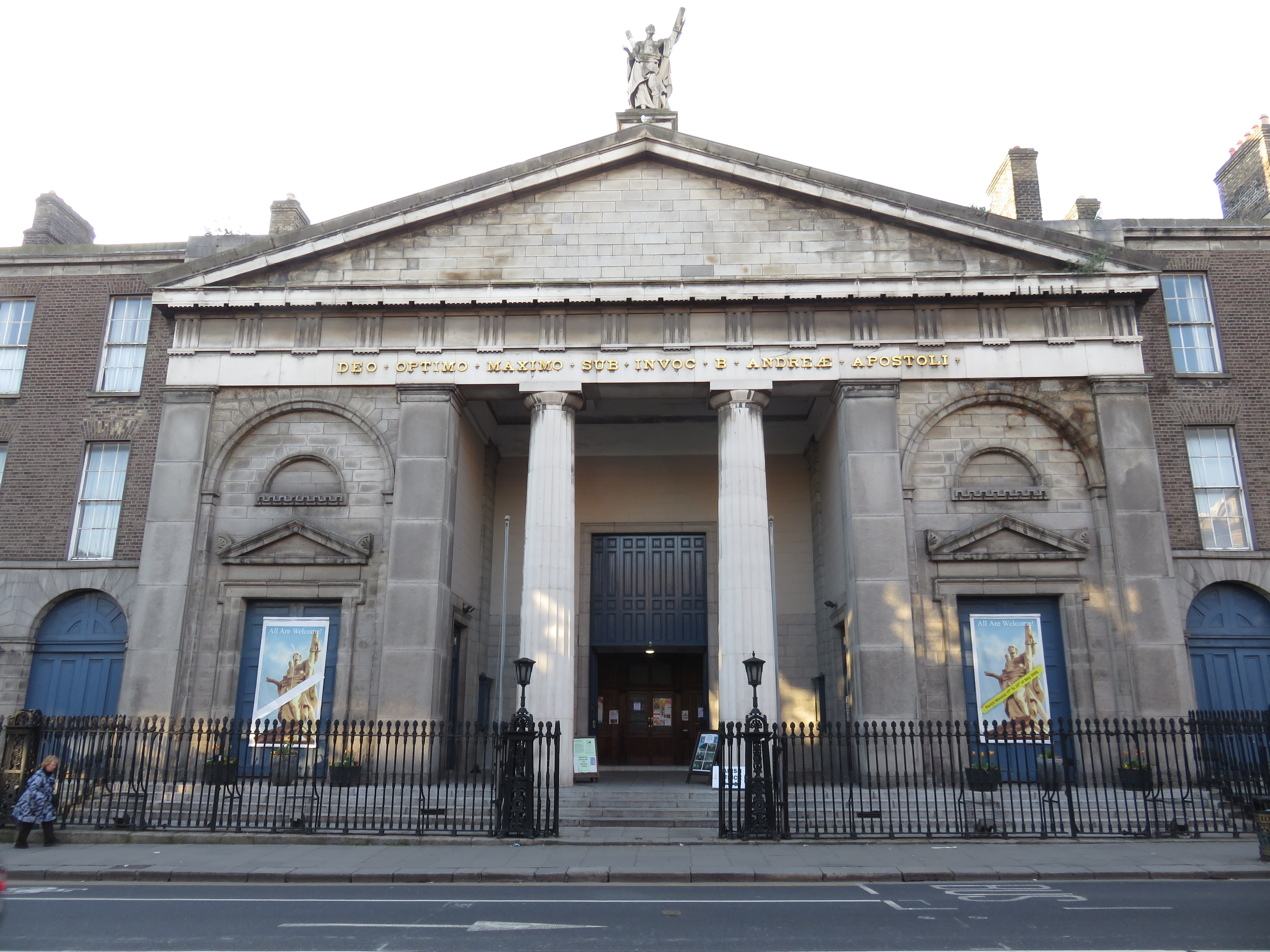
- The church in 2018
- St. Andrew's Church
- 53°20′35″N 6°14′56″W
- Location: Westland Row; Dublin
- Country: Ireland
- Denomination: Roman Catholic Church
- Website: https://www.standrews.ie/parish

History
- Dedication: St. Andrew
- Consecrated: 2 January 1834

Architecture
- Architect(s): John Bolger, based on plans by James Leeson, with input from Francis Johnston and James Lever. Roof by Richard Turner.
- Architectural type: Classical (Baroque)
- Style: Church

Administration
- Diocese: Dublin
- Deanery: South City Centre
- Parish: Westland Row Parish

St. Andrew's Church is a Roman Catholic church located in Westland Row, Dublin, Ireland. Construction started in 1832, it opened for public worship in 1834 but was not completed until 1837.

== History ==
The architect appointed to design the church was John Bolger. However, he used the plans for a previous church, in Townsend Street, which had been designed by James Leeson. Assistance was received from Francis Johnston and James Lever. The roof was by Richard Turner. The exterior of the church has a Doric portico with a statue of St. Andrew, sculpted by John Smyth (1776–1840), son of Edward Smyth (d.1812), sculptor of the Riverine heads at the Custom House.

On 7 January 1940 ornamentation fell from the ceiling, which prompted an investigation and refurbishment. This started in 1942 when the interior was renovated and painted. All sculptures were restored at the same time.

Dominic Corrigan (1802–1880), a noted physician, is buried in the crypt of the church.

== Organ ==
The organ of St. Andrew's was built by John White of Dublin in 1870–1 at a cost of £1,000. It is a large three-manual instrument, notable for containing ten ranks of pipework from the workshop of the renowned French organ builder Aristide Cavaillé-Coll. The original pneumatic-assisted mechanical action was removed during a rebuild in the 1950s and replaced with an electro-pneumatic system.

=== Specification ===
I. Choir
Gedeckt	8′
Viol de Gamba	8′
Flute	4′
Piccolo	2′
Larigot	1 ^{1}/_{3}′
Clarinet	8′
Swell to Choir

II. Great
Double Open Diapason	16′
Open Diapason	8′
Stopped Diapason	8′
Harmonic Flute	8′
Principal	4′
Harmonic Flute	4′
Twelfth	2 ^{2}/_{3}′
Fifteenth	2′
Tierce	1 ^{3}/_{5}′
Mixture	IV
Cimbel	II
Trumpet	8′
Clarion	4′
Swell to Great
Swell Octave to Great
Choir to Great

III. Swell
Open Diapason	8′
Flute	8′
Salicional	8′
Voix Celestes	8′
Principal	4′
Mixture	III
Oboe	8′
Vox Humana	8′
Trumpet	8′
Clarion	4′
Tremulant
Swell Sub Octave
Swell Octave

Pedal
Open Diapason	16′
Bourdon	16′
Octave	8′
Choral Bass	4′
Fagot	16′
Fagot	8′
Swell to Pedal
Great to Pedal
Choir to Pedal

=== Organists ===
- P.W. Gormley
- Alois Volkmer
- Joseph Seymour
- Louis O'Brien
- Carole O'Connor
- Aleksandr Nisse

== Gallery ==
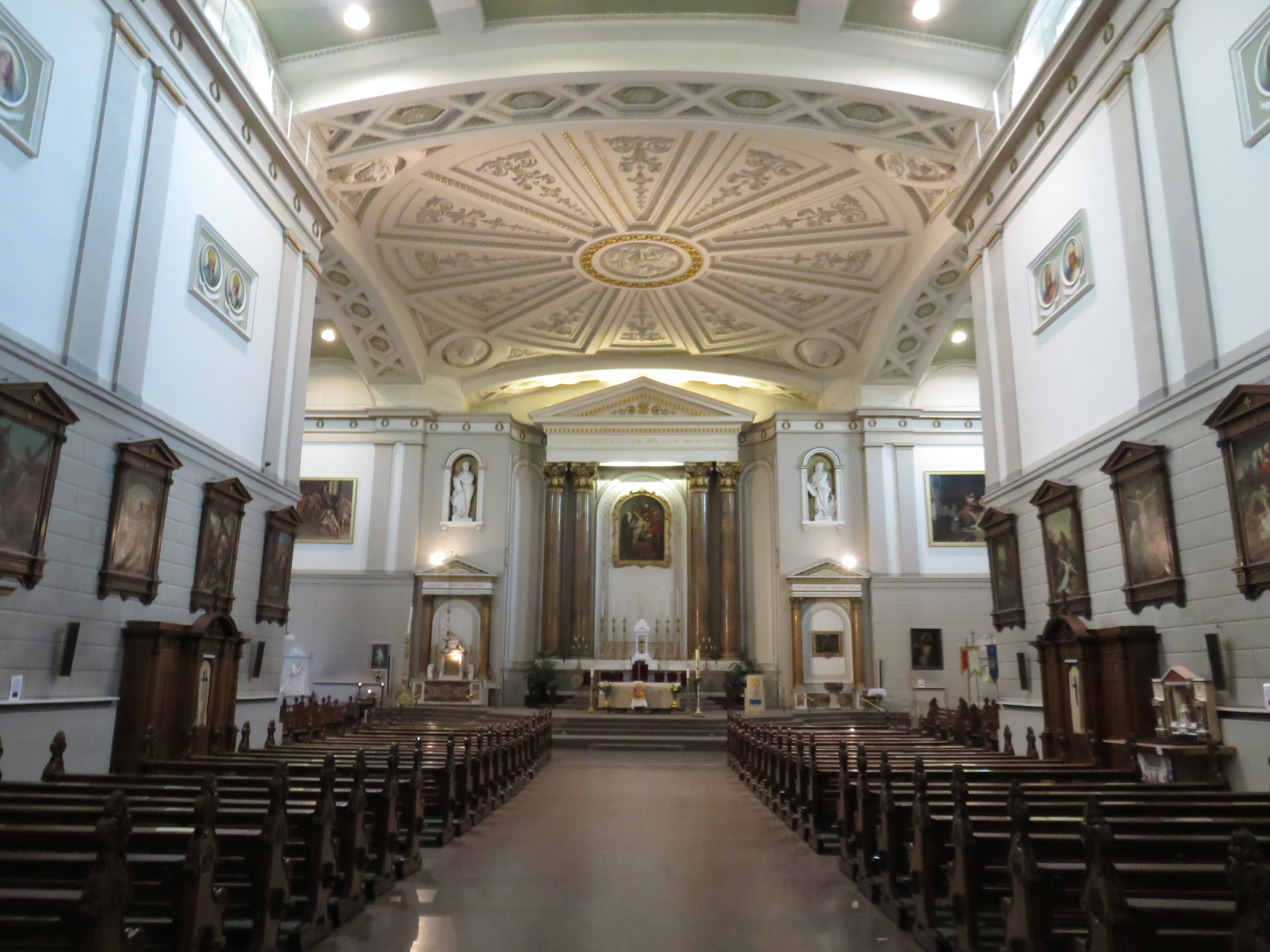
View towards sanctuary

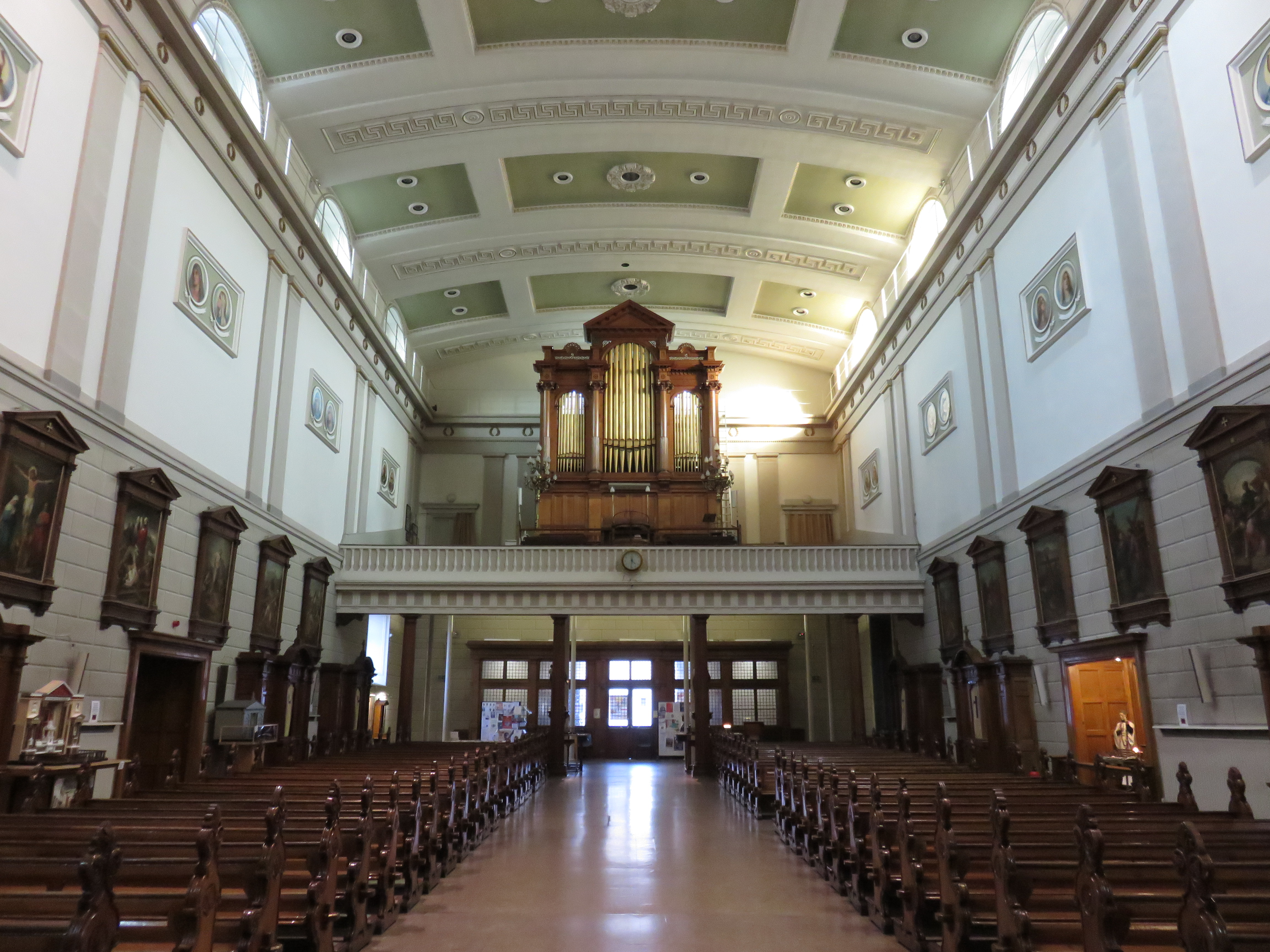
View towards rear

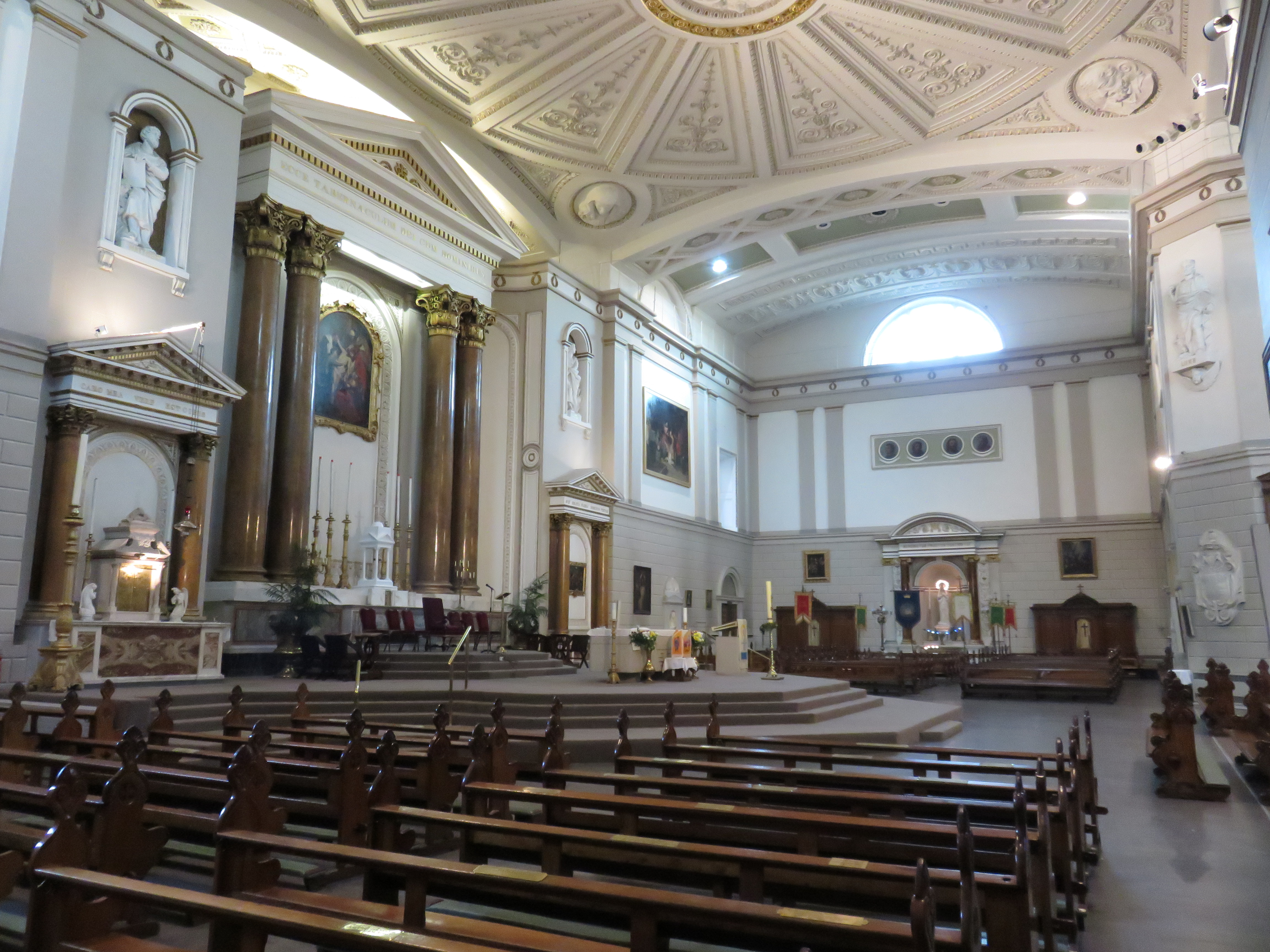
View from transept

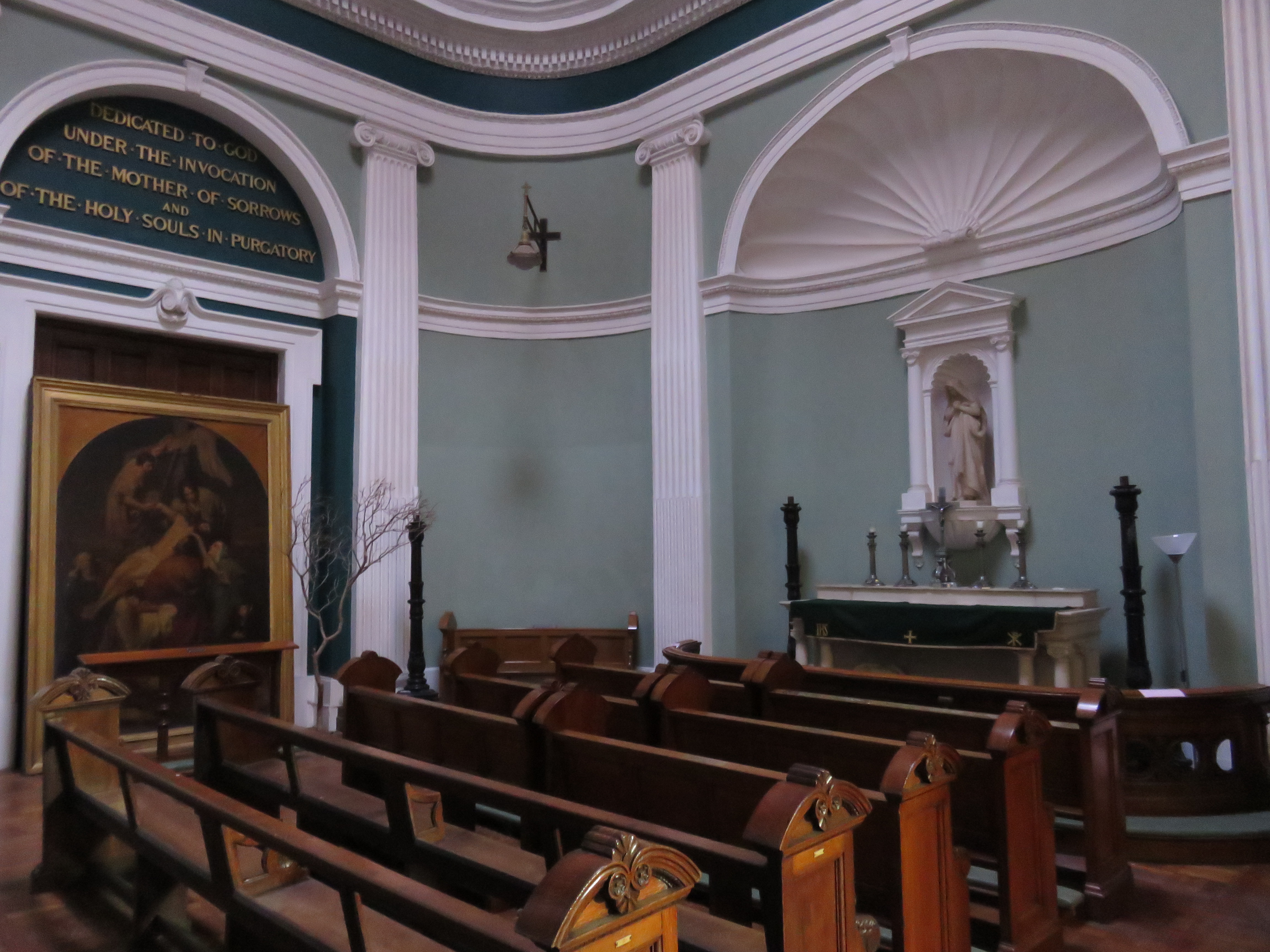
Side chapel

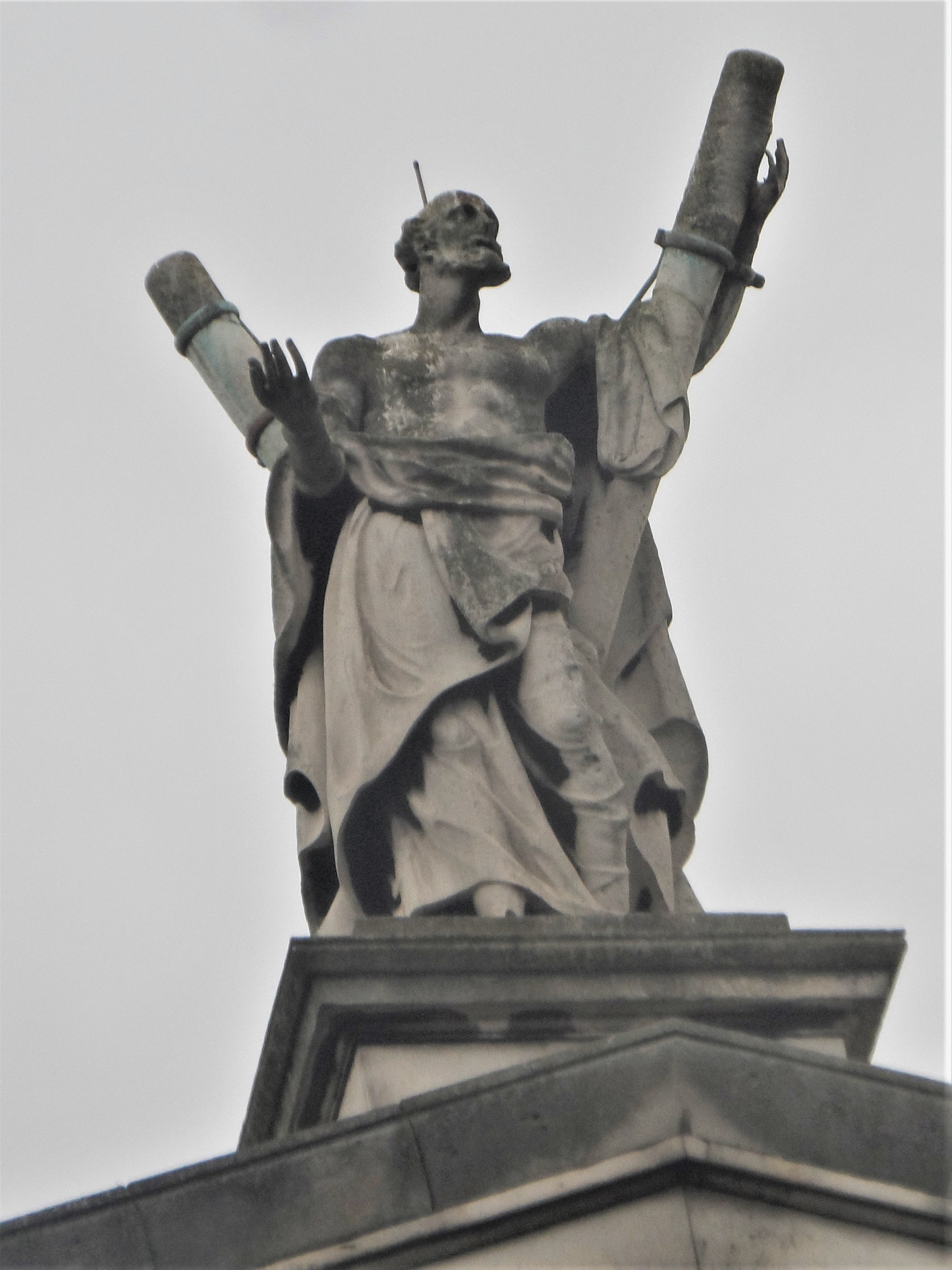
Statue of Andrew the Apostle

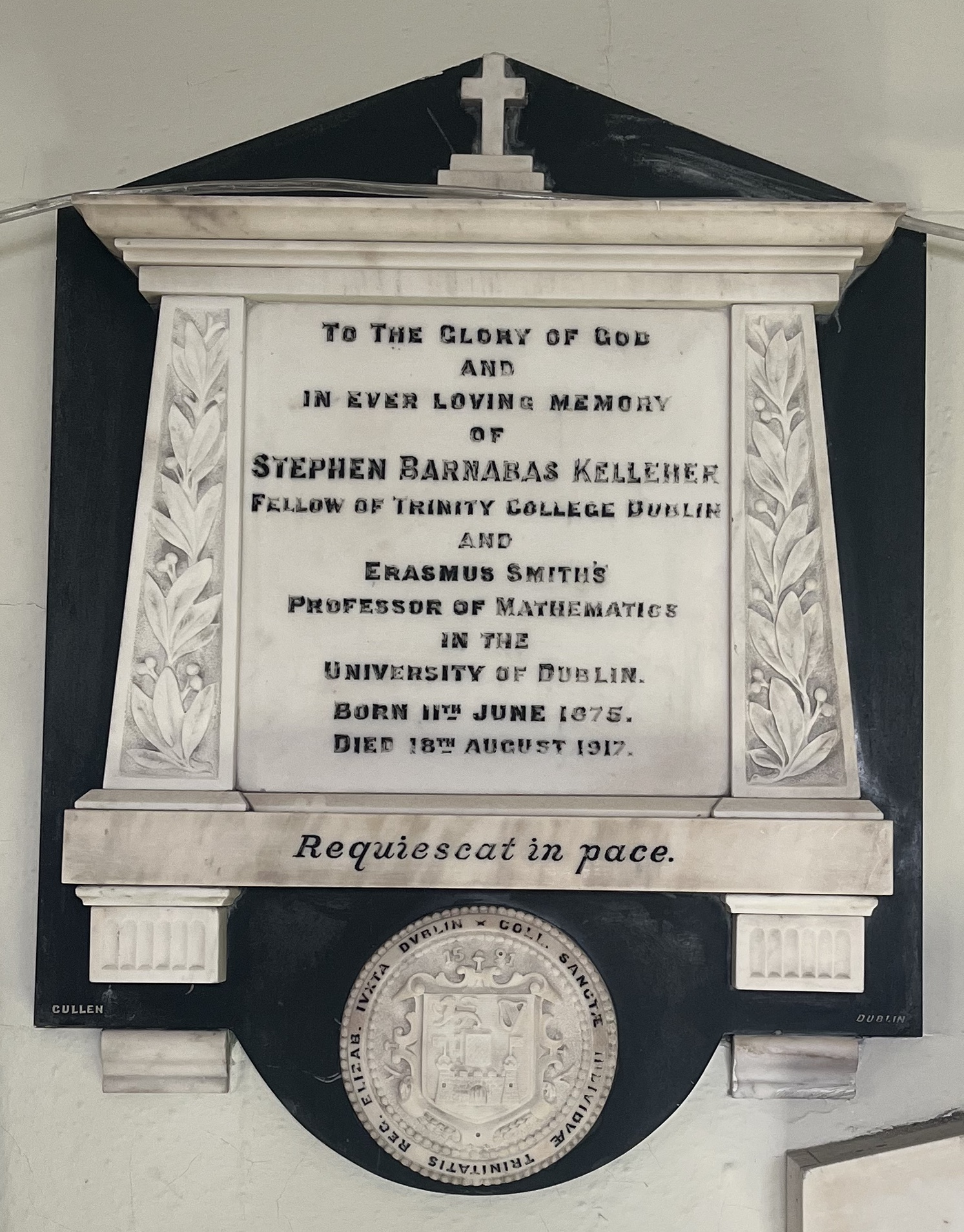
Stephen B. Kelleher Memorial

== References and sources ==
Notes

Sources

- Gilbert, John (1854). A History of the City of Dublin. Oxford: Oxford University.
- George Newenham Wright An Historical Guide to the City of Dublin
- Watson, Elizabeth (2007). St. Andrew's Church, Westland Row. Dublin: self.
- Casey, Christine (2005). Dublin: The City Within the Grand and Royal Canals and the Circular Road with the Phoenix Park. Yale: Yale University Press. ISBN 0-300-10923-7.
- Curtis, Joe (1992). Times, Chimes and Charms of Dublin. Dublin: Verge Books.
