= Inishmurray =

Island off the coast of County Sligo, Ireland

Native name: Inis Muirígh
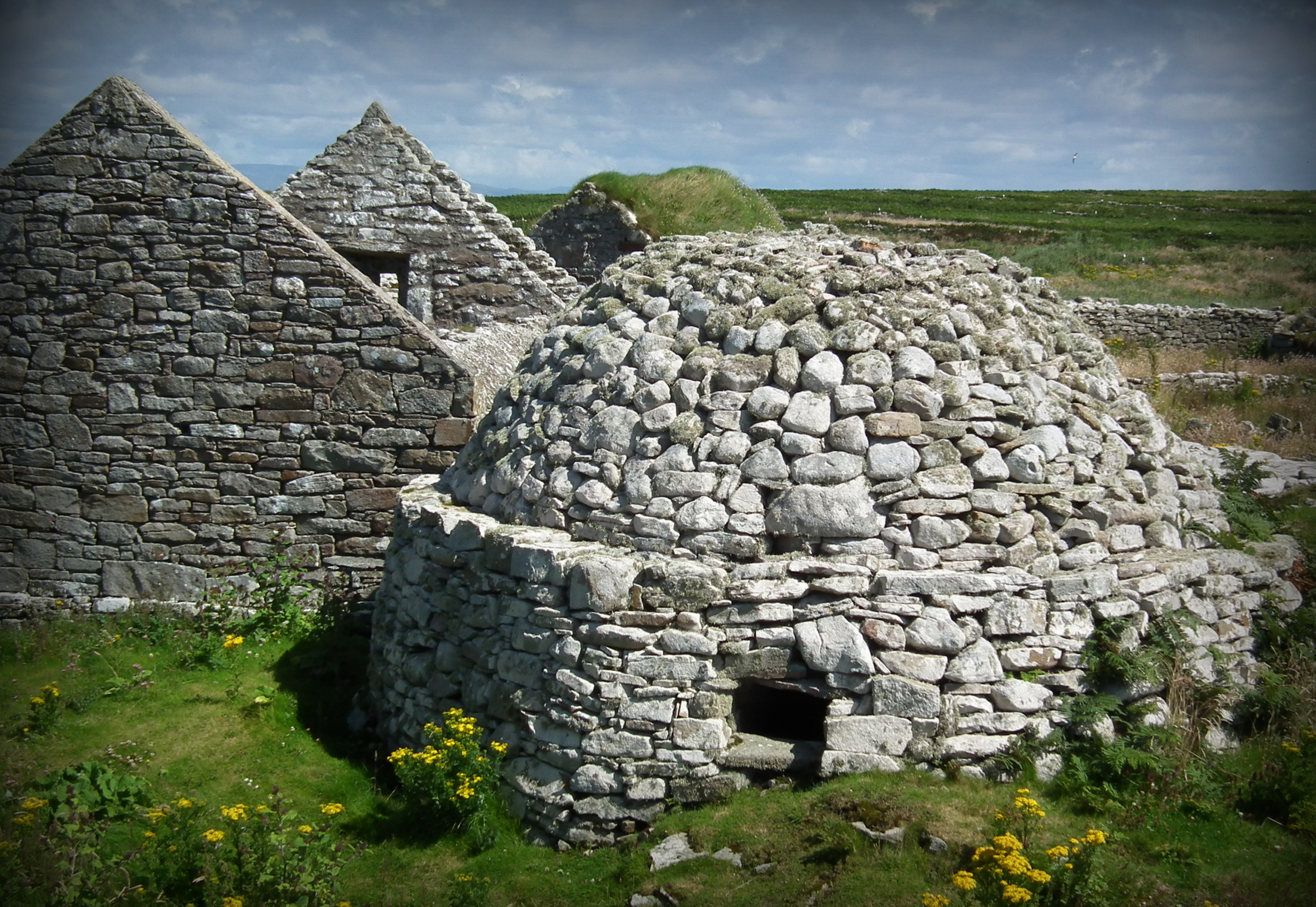
- Early Medieval Ecclesiastical Site

- Location within island of Ireland

Geography
- Location: Atlantic Ocean
- Coordinates: 54°26′N 8°40′W
- Area: 0.9 km^{2} (0.35 sq mi)

Administration
- Ireland
- Province: Connacht
- County: Sligo

Demographics
- Population: 0 (2011)

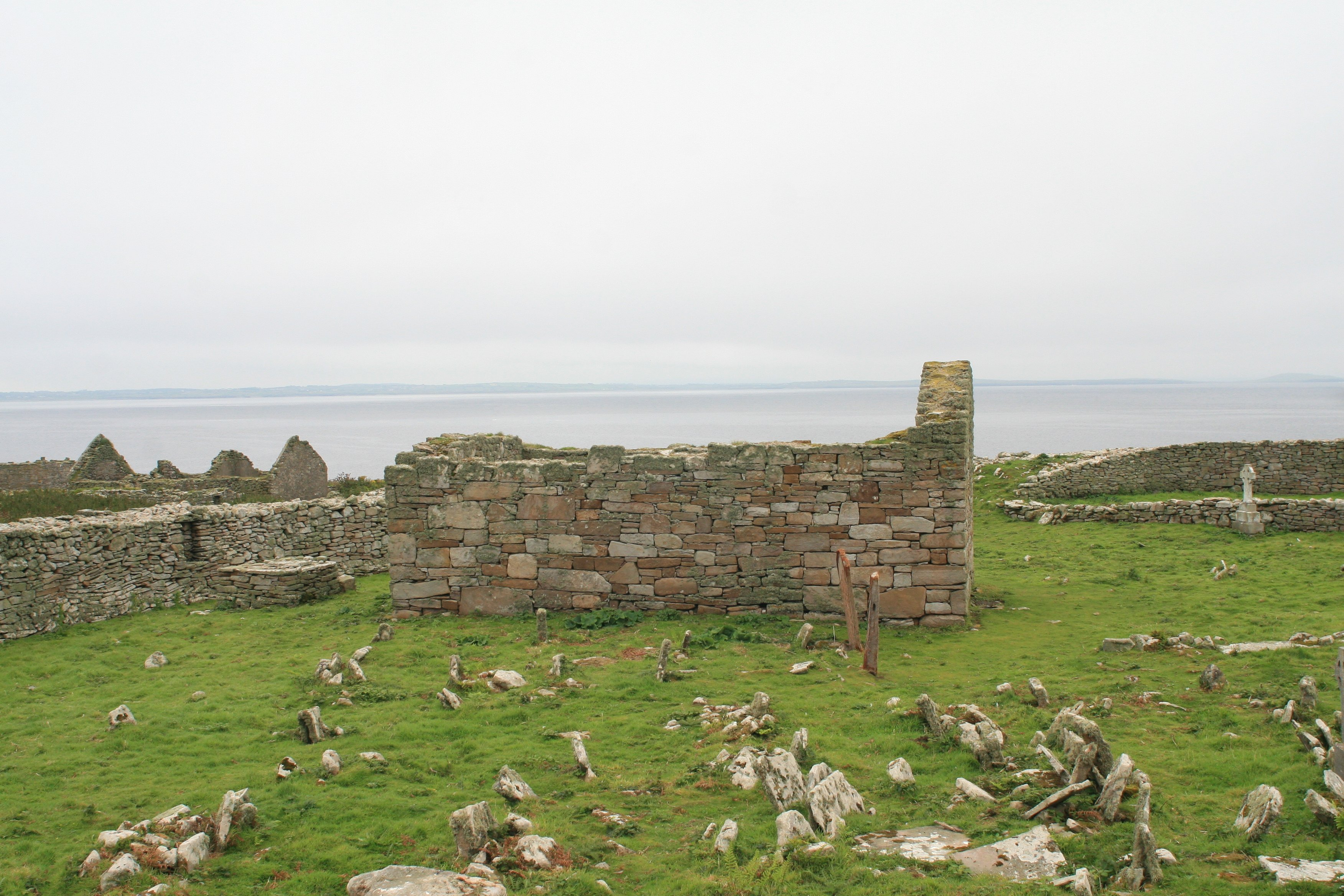
Teampall Molaise, the principal church of the monastery, as seen from the north with the mainland in the background.

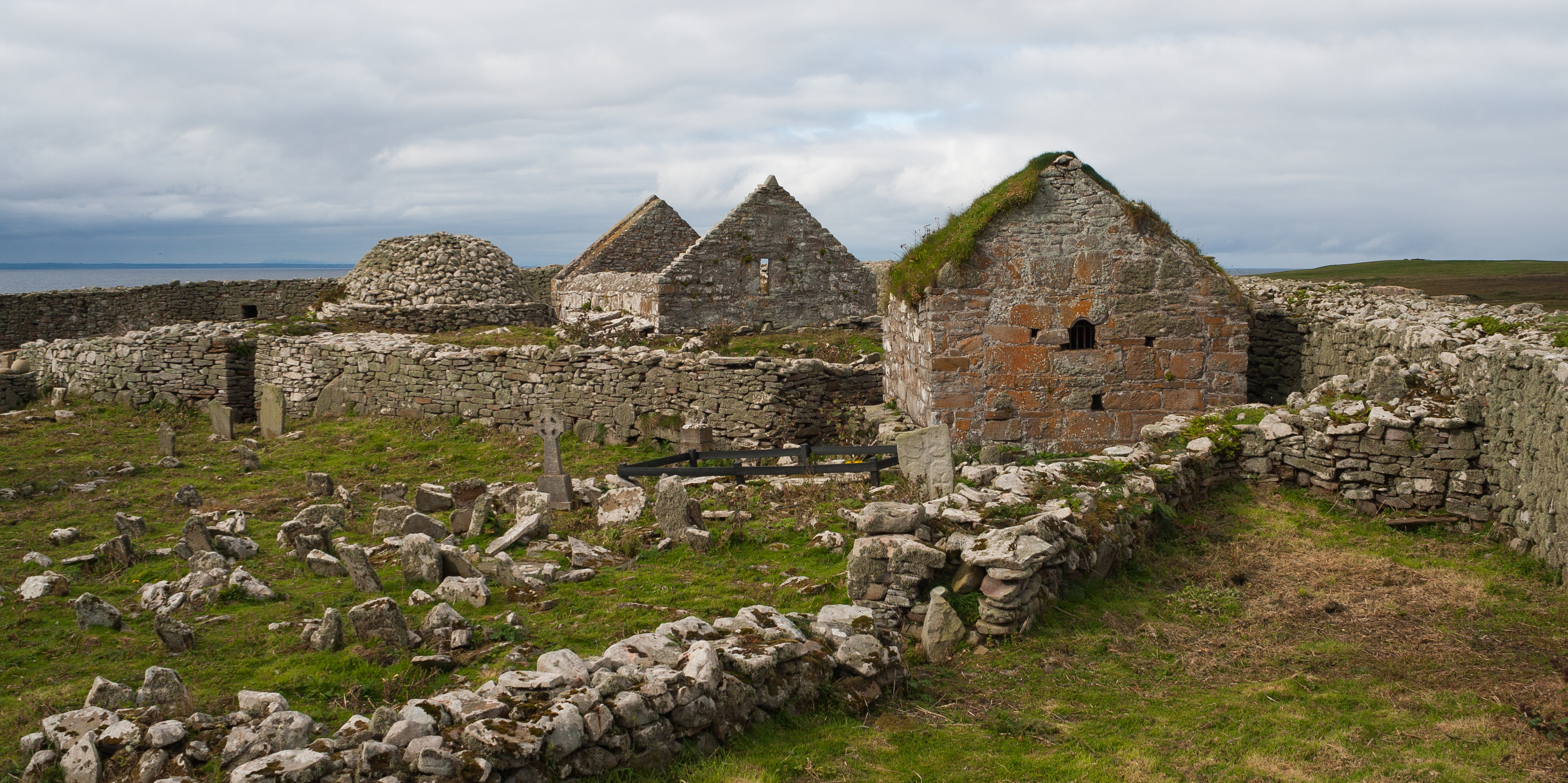
Inishmurray Teach Molaise E 2015 09 06

Inishmurray (Irish: Inis Muirígh or Inis Muireadheach meaning 'Muireadheach's island') is an uninhabited island situated 7 km (4 mi) off the coast of County Sligo, Ireland.

== Geography ==
The island, which is approximately 3.75 km (2.3 mi) long and 0.75 km (0.5 mi) wide, is 0.9 km^{2} (0.3 mi^{2}) in area. It is 7 km (4.3 mi) from the coast of County Sligo within Donegal Bay.

== Etymology ==
Inishmurray may be named after the early saint, Muiredach mac Echdach (fl. early 6th century) of Killala.

== History ==
There are remains of an early Irish monastic settlement. Laisrén (Saint Molaise) Mac Decláin reputedly founded a monastery here in the 6th century. He was confessor of Saint Columba (Colmcille) after the Battle of Cúl Dreimhne on the mainland nearby. His feast day is 12 August.

The island's ecclesiastical settlement was attacked in 795 and again in 807 by the Vikings, and eventually the monks abandoned the island and it remained uninhabited until the first secular settlement, probably in the 12th century.

=== Monastery complex ===
The monastery's enclosure wall reaches 4.5 metres (15 ft) in height at its highest point and is up to 3 metres (9.8 ft) thick in places. The site contains various ecclesiastical buildings including enclosures, a stone-roofed oratory, two churches, a clochán, a large beehive-shaped cell, a holy well and other remains including cross slabs suggesting foreign influences. The whole complex is composed of what is probably local sandstone rubble.

=== 19th and 20th century ===
The island's population, which peaked at just over 100 in the 1880s, were involved in lobster fishing, vegetable farming and grazing cattle. Some locals were also involved in the "illicit" distilling and selling of poitín.

The "King of Inishmurray", a customary title used by inhabitants of the island which was similar to the King of Tory, was last claimed by Michael Waters, who died in January 1951. Increases in barley and potato prices, during and after The Emergency (World War II), impacted the island's economy. In the 1940s, Waters and the island's 60 remaining inhabitants petitioned the Irish government for new land and were "evacuated" to the mainland of County Sligo in 1948. Inishmurray's last residents left the island on 12 November 1948.

=== Later history ===
Some of the island's abandoned buildings are still visible, including a number of houses and the island's school. The monastery site remained a pilgrimage destination into the late medieval period.

In 2018, the Marine Survey Office of the Department of Transport barred commercial operators from landing visitors on the island, due to "concerns for safety during embarking and disembarking". As of August 2019, landing facilities had not been developed and, as of March 2023, the development had yet to progress.

== See also ==
- List of abbeys and priories in Ireland (County Sligo)
