= Upwardly Mobile =

Irish sitcom

- Title card
- Genre: Situation comedy
- Written by: Brian Lynch
- Directed by: Jeff Naylor
- Starring: Joe Savino; Catherine Byrne; Niall Buggy; Hilary Fannin; Mark O'Regan; Robbie Doolin; David Kelly
- Theme music composer: Ronan Johnston
- Country of origin: Ireland
- Original language: English
- No. of series: 3
- No. of episodes: 44

Production
- Executive producer: David Blake Knox
- Production locations: Studio 4, RTÉ Television Centre, Donnybrook, Dublin 4, Ireland
- Camera setup: Multi-camera
- Running time: 30 minutes
- Production company: Raidió Teilifís Éireann

Original release
- Network: RTÉ One
- Release: 8 September 1995 – 26 December 1997

Upwardly Mobile is an Irish television sitcom that was made and broadcast by RTÉ. Three series, including three Christmas specials, were originally broadcast on RTÉ One between 8 September 1995 and 26 December 1997.

The programme starred Joe Savino and Catherine Byrne as northside couple Eddie and Molly Keogh, who win the Lotto and move to the exclusive Belvedere Downs estate on the southside of Dublin. Backed by a strong supporting cast, the series chronicles their highs and lows in life, in particular the contrast with their upper-class neighbours.

== Broadcast dates ==
=== Series ===
Series	Year	Dates	No. Episodes
Series 1	1995	8 September – 17 November	12
Series 2	1996	13 September – 25 December	16
Series 3	1997	12 September – 16 December	16

=== Special ===
Title	Year	Date
Upwardly Mobile Christmas Special	1995	25 December
