= How to Keep an Alien =

How to Keep an Alien is a one-person show written and performed by Irish playwright Sonya Kelly, supported in the original run by stage manager Justin Murphy, and directed by Gina Moxley. The show chronicles Kelly's attraction to and then relationship with her stage manager at the time, the Australian national Kate Ferris, and fight to keep her in the country. It premiered in Dublin in 2013, and since has been on several national and international tours, including the Edinburgh Fringe, New York, and Finland, and is being performed in several festivals in New Zealand in 2017.
