= Sonya Kelly =

Irish playwright and screenwriter

- Born: Dublin, Ireland
- Education: Trinity College Dublin
- Occupations: Playwright, screenwriter
- Relatives: Frank Kelly (uncle)

Sonya Kelly is an Irish playwright and screenwriter.

Kelly was born in Dublin. Some of her family had a theatre background: her uncle Frank Kelly was a well-known actor, and an aunt who taught speech and drama sent her plays by George Bernard Shaw as a teenager. She studied drama and classics at Trinity College Dublin.

After graduation she got a few acting roles in Dublin's Gate Theatre before spending some time as a stand-up comedian. She then progressed to what she has described as "a medium somewhere between theatre and comedy", doing self-performing autobiographical pieces. "The Wheelchair on my Face" was the first of these followed by "How to Keep an Alien". Her first play for other actors was "Furniture".

Productions of Kelly's plays "The Wheelchair on My Face" and "The Last Return" have won Scotsman Fringe First awards.

She lives in Dublin with her Australian wife Kate. They met while they were both working on a play at the Project Arts Centre, Dublin. Their daughter Juno was born in 2021.

Kelly was a 2024 recipient of the Windham Campbell Prize for Drama.

== Playography ==
- The Wheelchair on My Face
- How to Keep an Alien
- Furniture
- Once Upon a Bridge
- The Last Return
