= Westland Row =

Street in Dublin, Ireland

Coordinates: 53°20′34″N 6°15′00″W

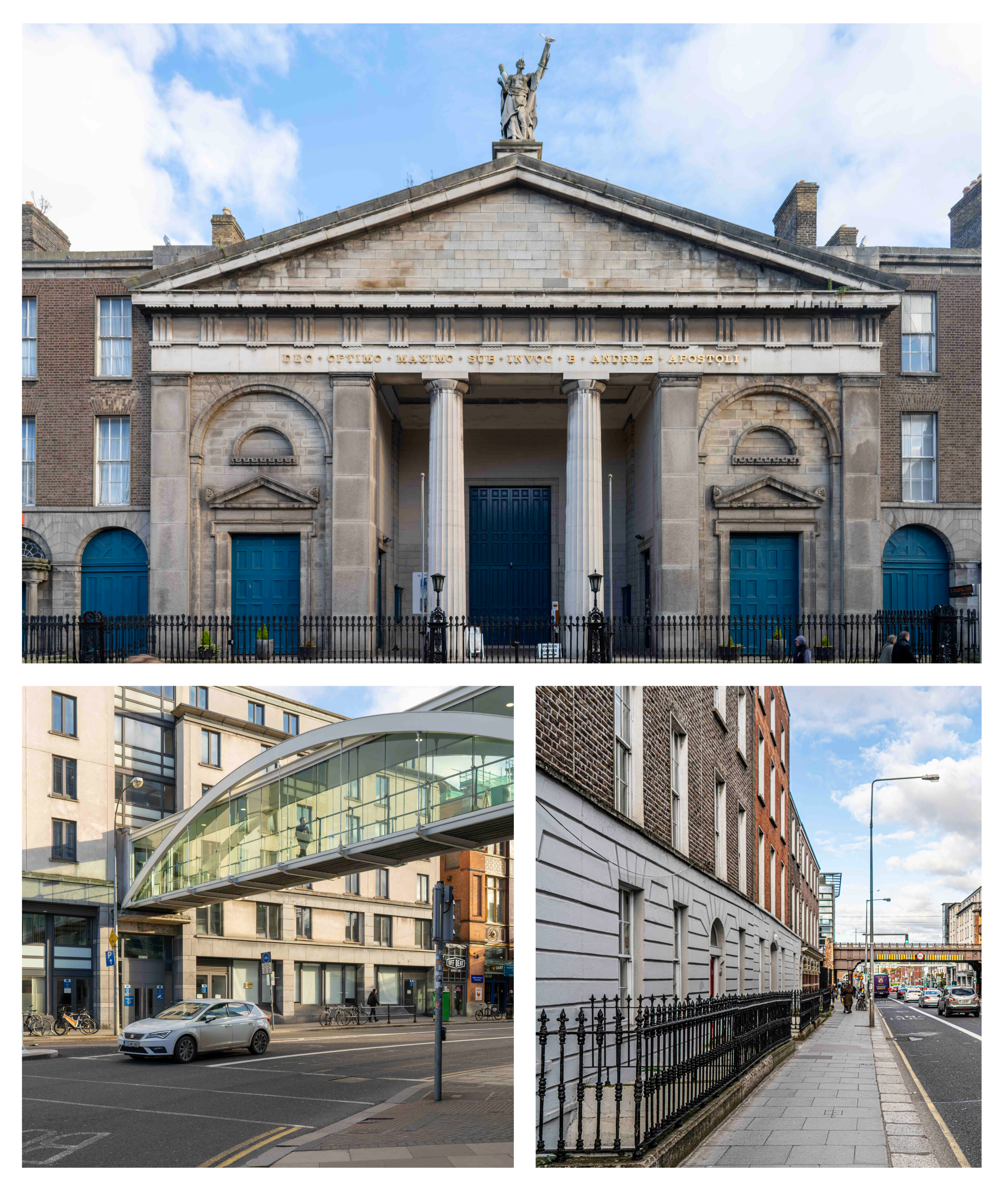
- Clockwise from top: St Andrew's Church; looking north along Westland Row; the junction of Westland Row and Pearse Street

- Location within Central Dublin
- Native name: Rae an Iarthair (Irish)
- Namesake: William Westland
- Length: 250 m (820 ft)
- Width: 21 metres (69 ft)
- Location: Dublin, Ireland
- Postal code: D02
- north end: Pearse Street
- south end: Lincoln Place

Other
- Known for: Pearse Station, Church of St. Andrew, Royal Irish Academy of Music

Westland Row (Irish: Rae an Iarthair) is a street on the Southside of Dublin, Ireland.

== Location ==
The street runs along the east end of Trinity College Dublin.

== History ==
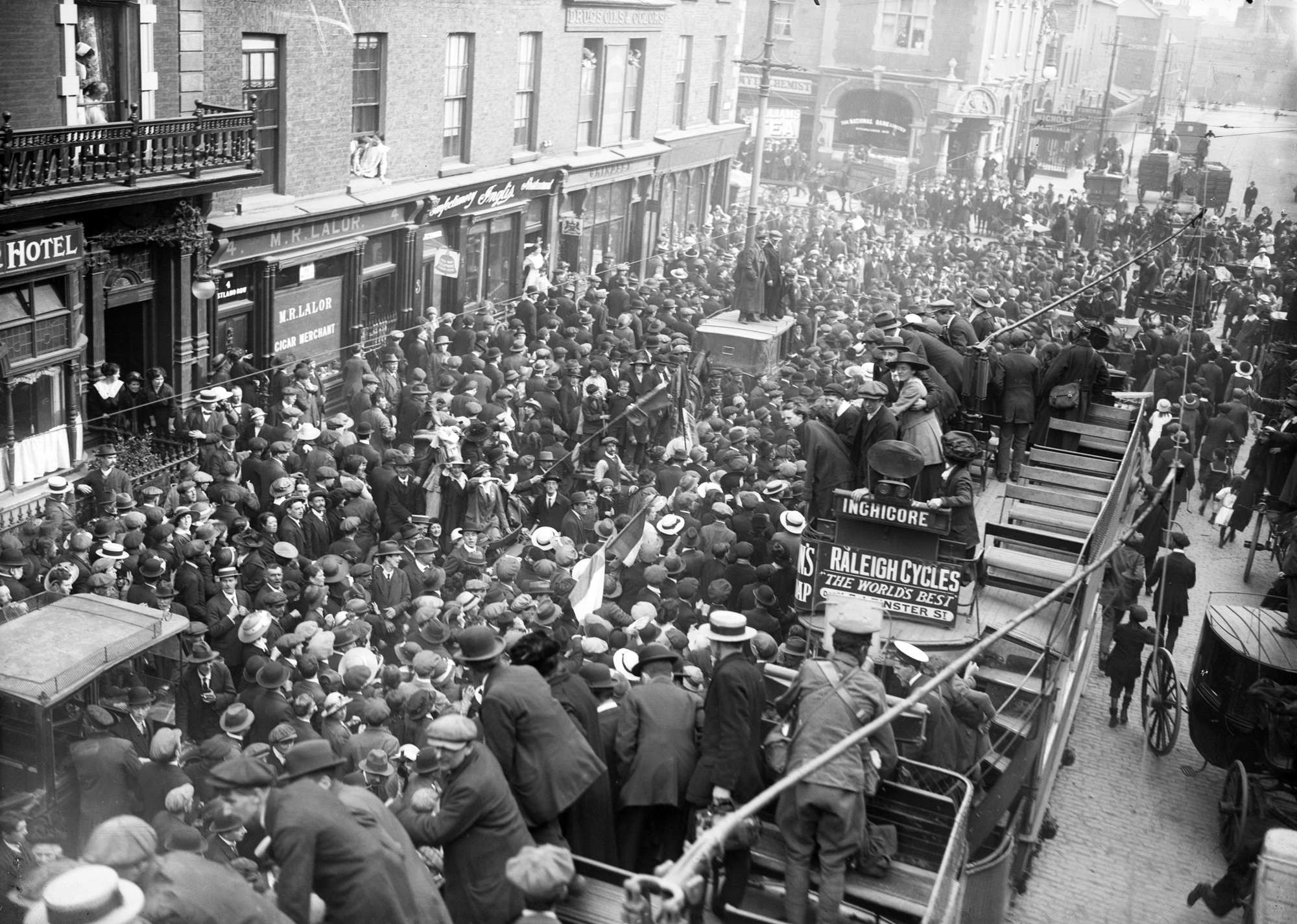
Crowds meeting prisoners under a general amnesty, Monday, 18 June 1917. Many are onboard the Dublin tramways electric trams with other spectators in the street. There are advertisements for Raleigh Cycles.

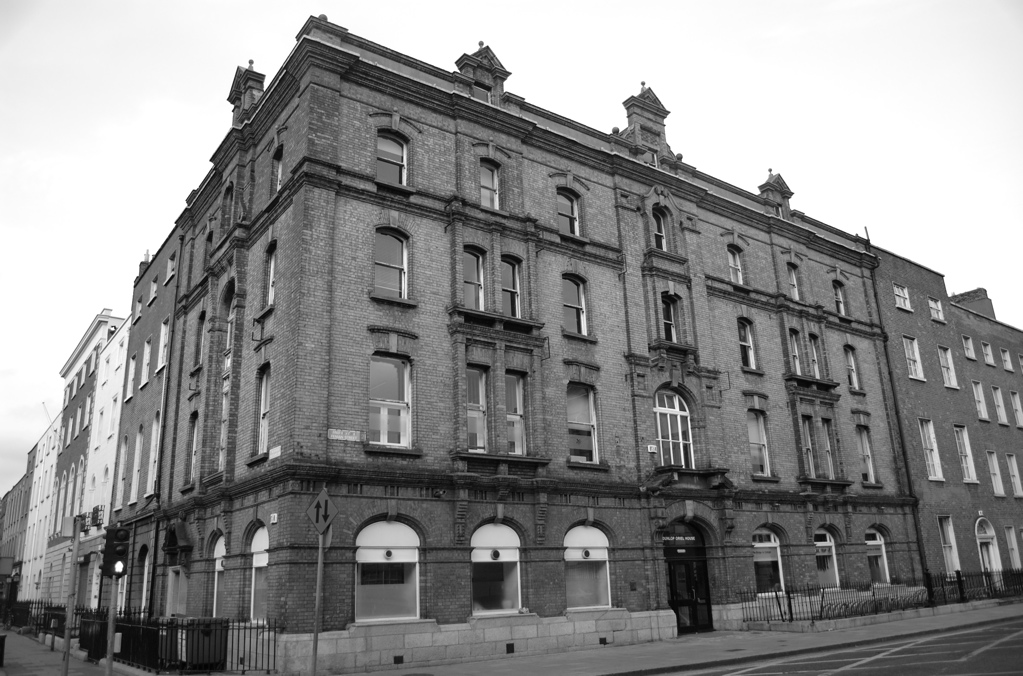
South façade, Oriel House, Westland Row

Westland Row first appeared on maps in 1776. It was originally known as Westlands after William Westland who owned property in the area in the 18th century.

The Free State Intelligence Department was based at Oriel House.

Writer Oscar Wilde was born at 21 Westland Row, and future President of Ireland Mary Robinson and her four brothers lived there during their time as students. It is now home of the Oscar Wilde Centre.

Many research departments and Schools associated with Trinity, such as the Hitachi Dublin Laboratory and the Trinity School of Pharmacy, maintain administrative offices on the west side of the street. The eastern side of the street is dominated by Pearse Station, formerly called Westland Row Station, and the Church of St. Andrew. The Royal Irish Academy of Music is also based on the street.

The eponymous CBS Westland Row school backs onto the street, although the school entrance is on Cumberland Street.

== See also ==
- List of streets and squares in Dublin
