= Derek Hill (painter) =

English painter (1916–2000)

Derek Hill CBE, HRHA
- Born: Arthur Derek Hill; 6 December 1916; Southampton, Hampshire, England
- Died: 30 July 2000 (aged 83); London, England
- Known for: painting
- Movement: Tory School

Arthur Derek Hill, CBE, HRHA (6 December 1916 – 30 July 2000) was an English portrait and landscape painter and a longtime resident of Ireland.

== Life and work ==
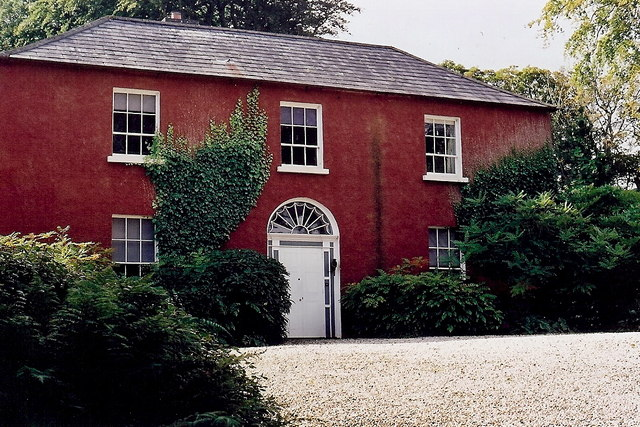
Hill's home at Churchill

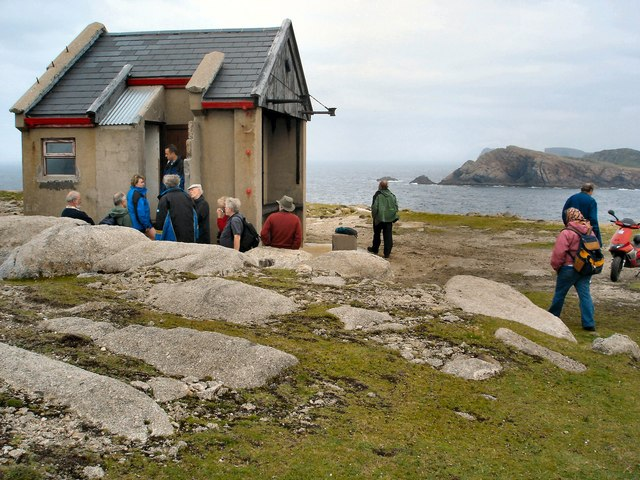
Hill's painting hut on Tory Island

=== Early life ===
Hill was born at Southampton, in Hampshire, the son of a wealthy sugar trader.

=== Career ===
He first worked as a theatre designer in Leningrad in the 1930s, and later as an historian. In the Second World War he registered as a conscientious objector and worked on a farm.

His long association with Ireland began when he visited Glenveagh Castle, County Donegal to paint the portrait of the Irish-American art collector, Henry McIlhenny, whose grandfather had emigrated to the United States from the nearby village of Milford, and who subsequently made a fortune from his patent gas meter.

Hill began to enjoy increased success as a portrait painter from the 1960s; his subjects including many notable composers, musicians, politicians and statesmen, such as broadcaster Gay Byrne, Jerusalem mayor Teddy Kollek and the Prince of Wales. He was also an enthusiastic art collector and traveller, with a wide range of friends such as Bryan Guinness and Isaiah Berlin. Greta Garbo visited Hill in the 1970s, a visit which formed inspiration for Frank McGuinness' 2010 play Greta Garbo Came to Donegal. In 1981, he donated to the state his home, St. Columb's Rectory, near the village of Churchill, County Donegal, which he had owned since 1954, along with a considerable collection including work by Pablo Picasso, Edgar Degas, Georges Braque, Graham Sutherland, Anna Ticho and Jack Butler Yeats.

An exhibition of his work and personal art collection can be seen at the house and associated Glebe Gallery at Churchill, near Letterkenny. Another collection of his work is held at Mottisfont Abbey. Many of his landscapes portray scenes from Tory Island, where he had a painting hut for years, and started and then mentored the artists' community there, teaching the local fishermen how to paint. This led on to the informal but busy "Tory School" of artists such as James Dixon and Anton Meenan, who found that they had the time to paint and used their wild surroundings as a dramatic subject.

Hill was made a CBE in 1997. A retrospective exhibition was arranged for and by him at the Royal Hibernian Academy in 1998. In 1999, he was made an honorary Irish citizen by Irish President Mary McAleese.

He died at a London hospital on 30 July 2000, aged 83, and is buried in Hampshire in the South of England with his parents. Memorial services were held for him in Dublin at St Patrick's Cathedral, as well as St James's Church, Piccadilly, London, and his local church in Trentagh, County Donegal.

== Biographies ==
In 1987 Grey Gowrie's illustrated essay on Hill was published by Quartet. Gowrie considered his landscapes to be as good as those of Jack Yeats. A fuller biography of Hill by Bruce Arnold was published in 2010.

- Bruce Arnold: Derek Hill, London: Quartet, 2010, ISBN 978-0-7043-7171-2

== Rome and the Derek Hill Foundation Scholarship ==
Derek Hill loved Rome and was the Director of Fine Arts at the British School at Rome (BSR) for about five years during the 1950s. During his lively two tenures, he encouraged resident art scholars, which included Anthony Fry and John Bratby, to travel throughout Italy, whilst, in the academy itself, Hill fostered an enthusiastic and creative atmosphere.

In 1989, shortly before Hill's death, he established a charitable trust which provides annual bursaries for the Derek Hill Foundation Scholarship residencies at the BSR. The scholarship is granted through an open, competitive selection of British and Irish artists in the fields of drawing and painting, providing a stipend and three months full-board in one of the Edwin Austin Abbey studios. Winners of the award have included Emma Stibbon RA and David O'Kane.
