= Newmills Corn and Flax Mills =

Grain mill in County Donegal, Ireland

Newmills Corn & Flax Mills

Newmills Corn and Flax Mills (Irish: An Muileann Úr – Muilte Arbhair agus Lín) is a grain mill located in County Donegal, Ireland. The mill is situated on the R250, Churchill road, beside Newmills Bridge on the south bank of the River Swilly, 5 kilometres west of Letterkenny in the small town of Milltown. It features one of the largest operating waterwheels in the country. The millrace is 1 km long and powers two separate millheels, one for grinding oats and barley and the other for flax.

== History ==
Scutching the Flax

Corn and flax mills have been located there since the early 19th century when the Joseph Hunter. This combination of corn and flax mills is found mainly in Ulster where both types of mill were intimately linked to the surrounding farming economy. In 1861, Joseph Hunter sold the mills to John Devine and when Patrick Gallagher moved to Newmills in 1892, he bought the complex from William Devine, John's son. In addition to the mills, Gallagher purchased a residence, public house, grocery and ancillary buildings, including a scutcher's cottage This was located in a field beside the mill pond. The complex also included a forge on the opposite side of the road as well as a sizeable farm of land. The business at Newmills was continued by his son, P.F. Gallagher until his death in 1980.

In 1892 the buildings were in a very poor state of repair and, according to the Valuation Office, the corn mills were disused and had been converted to use as farm buildings. Patrick Gallagher made extensive improvements to the corn mill around 1907 when he fitted the waterwheel present today as well as improving the machinery within the mill. During the Second World War, P.F. Gallagher took advantage of the revival of the flax industry when the British Government offered grants to increase the production of flax to guarantee the supply of linen for the war effort. He demolished a small single-storey flax mill in the early 1940s to make way for the relatively modern looking building. The public house and grocery were an important part of the whole enterprise and proved quite successful in the early years of the 20th century. Indeed, a lively export trade developed and when Sir Thomas Lipton started his grocery business in Glasgow, he received his first consignment of butter, bacon, eggs from Newmills.

The importance of Newmills was recognised in a 1978 An Foras Forbatha inventory of industrial archaeological monuments which identified it as by far the best example of a mill complex in County Donegal. In 1986, the mills were purchased by the state for preservation as a national monument. Under the direction of the Office of Public Works, a group of Irish and international volunteers restored the mills and millrace in 1989.

== Corn mill ==
The corn mill handled mainly oats and barley grown locally as well as imported maize. The mill is a three-storey building and all the apparatus of the mill, stone, sieves, bucket elevators, fans and a sack hoist are powered by a 7.63-metre (25 ft) waterwheel manufactured by J.Stevenson's Strabane Foundry in 1867. The waterwheel turned at three revolutions a minute generating eight horsepower which was transferred from the waterwheel to the mill apparatus by means of gearing and belting. The building also housed a kiln for drying the grain. Harry Pinkerton from Raphoe, the miller at Newmills for some years after the Second World War, stated that the mill was in operation nearly all year round. From the harvest in late summer right up to April or May the following year the mill was engaged in grinding the locally grown grains. During the summer months, animal-feed was prepared, usually by mixing maize with oats.

The milling floor of the Corn Mill

The first processing of the grain that had been delivered by the farmer to the mill was to dry it. The grain was spread to a depth of around 15 cm (6ins) on the drying floor, made up of perforated metal plates on the ground floor. These were heated by the kiln on the lowerground floor, which was fired with a mulled coal, a smokeless fuel, somewhat like anthracite. Turf was not used as it gave the oats an unpleasant flavour. The kiln could dry two tonnes of oats a day, but this could be increased to another half tonne by putting on a load over night.

The grain was then moved to the shelling stones, one or two sets of stones on the ground floor. These separated the hull or husk from the kernel of the grain. The kernels were then ground into oatmeal by the grinding or milling stones. These were usually of a stone known as French burr. The grinding faces had to be dressed or picked at regular intervals to keep the cutting edges sharp. The upper or runner stone could be raised or lowered depending on whether fine, pinhead or coarse oatmeal was required. The meal was lifted to the first floor or upper level where it was cleaned, winnowed and sieved on a series of shakers and fans located there. After this, it was taken back to the lower ground floor to be bagged and then hoisted to the storage area to await collection. Using an ingenious combination of hoists, belts, pulleys and elevators, the whole milling process was highly mechanised and could be managed without too much difficulty by one man. It took 75 kg (1.25cwt) of oats to make 50 kg (1cwt) of meal, although it could be more depending on the quality of the oats. The ground meal was weighed by the miller and muthered, which meant that the miller retained 4.5 kg (10 lbs) of meal from every 50 kg bag, as payment for his work. The original family home, shop and pub still on the grounds are also owned by the National Monuments Section of the Office of Public Works and are presently undergoing renovation.
