= Churchill, County Donegal =

Village in County Donegal, Ireland

Church Hill Mín an Lábáin
- Village
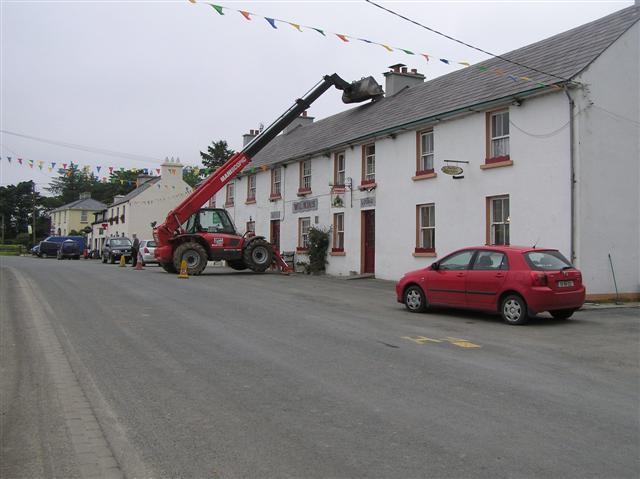
- The village is on the R251 road

- Location in Ireland
- Coordinates: 54°59′24″N 7°53′30″W
- Country: Ireland
- Province: Ulster
- County: County Donegal

Government
  - Dáil Éireann: Donegal
- Time zone: UTC+0 (WET)
  - Summer (DST): UTC-1 (IST (WEST))
- Area code: 074
- Irish Grid Reference: C068159

Church Hill, historically known as Minalaban (Irish: Mín an Lábáin), is a small village and townland in County Donegal, Ireland. The village is 8 miles (13 km) from Letterkenny. The village's name is derived from its location on a small hilltop.

Church Hill has a post office, one off license, a takeaway restaurant, a tea room and two pubs. The local Catholic church is located a mile away while there is a Church of Ireland located in the village itself.

== Heritage and culture ==
Nearby places of interest include the Colmcille Heritage Centre, the Glebe House and Gallery, Glenveagh Castle and Newmills Corn and Flax Mills.

The Churchill Fair takes place on the third weekend in July.

== People ==
The landscape and portrait painter Derek Hill lived and worked in Churchill until 1954. He presented his house and his art collection to the Irish state in 1981.

== See also ==
- List of populated places in Ireland
- Churchill railway station
