= The Rimini Riddle =

- Written by: Mary Elizabeth Burke-Kennedy
- Country of origin: Ireland
- No. of series: 3
- No. of episodes: 95

Original release
- Network: RTÉ
- Release: 26 September 1992 – March 1995

The Rimini Riddle is a partially lost Irish puppet television series, written by Mary Elizabeth Burke-Kennedy. It was produced and aired on RTÉ in the Republic of Ireland from 1992 to 1995.

== Plot ==
Three siblings: oldest brother Rory, youngest brother Leo, and a middle sister named Ellen are sent to live with their selfish, greedy Aunt Vera in her boarding house, The Rimini House after the deaths of their parents.

It premiered on 26 September 1992 and ran for 95 episodes over three series, ending in 1995. Due to the show never receiving a home media release, a large number of episodes have become fully or partially lost.
