= Extra! Extra! Read All About It! =

1993 Irish TV series

- Genre: Situation comedy
- Written by: Frank Sheerin
- Starring: Nuala Holloway; Morgan Jones; Lise Ann McLaughlin; Lorraine Pilkington; Norman Rodway; Peter Vollebregt
- Country of origin: Ireland
- Original language: English
- No. of series: 1
- No. of episodes: 8

Production
- Production locations: Studio 1, RTÉ Television Centre, Donnybrook, Dublin 4, Ireland
- Camera setup: Multi-camera
- Running time: 30 minutes

Original release
- Network: RTÉ 1
- Release: 3 November – 22 December 1993

Extra! Extra! Read All About It! is an Irish television sitcom that aired on RTÉ 1 for one season of eight episodes in 1993. The show was written by Frank Sheerin, and the stand-up comedian, Morgan Jones, was a cast member. Hilary Fannin had a small role in the show.

The show was notable for its negative reception. Writing in the Connacht Sentinel, journalist Declan Tierney gave the programme a negative review: "to say that this is a pathetic attempt at comedy is being kind to "Extra! Extra! Read All About It!" and stated "the only indication that it is a comedy comes from the canned laughter, which is over-done and often goes on for so long that it is impossible to hear the start of the next sentence". Writer Colm Tóibín stated Extra! Extra! was "probably the worst programme RTÉ has ever shown". Brendan Glacken of The Irish Times was equally scathing: "Speaking of Extra! Extra!, as I am afraid we still must, even seasoned RTÉ observers seem unable to answer the question why a series so pathetically weak should have been allowed to reach the screen at all". Extra! Extra! was later included in an Irish Independent list of the worst Irish TV programmes.

The name of the show comes from the phrase "Extra! Extra! Read all about it!" formerly used by street news vendors to sell newspaper extras.
