= River Swilly =

River in County Donegal, Ireland

Coordinates: 54°58′N 7°41′W

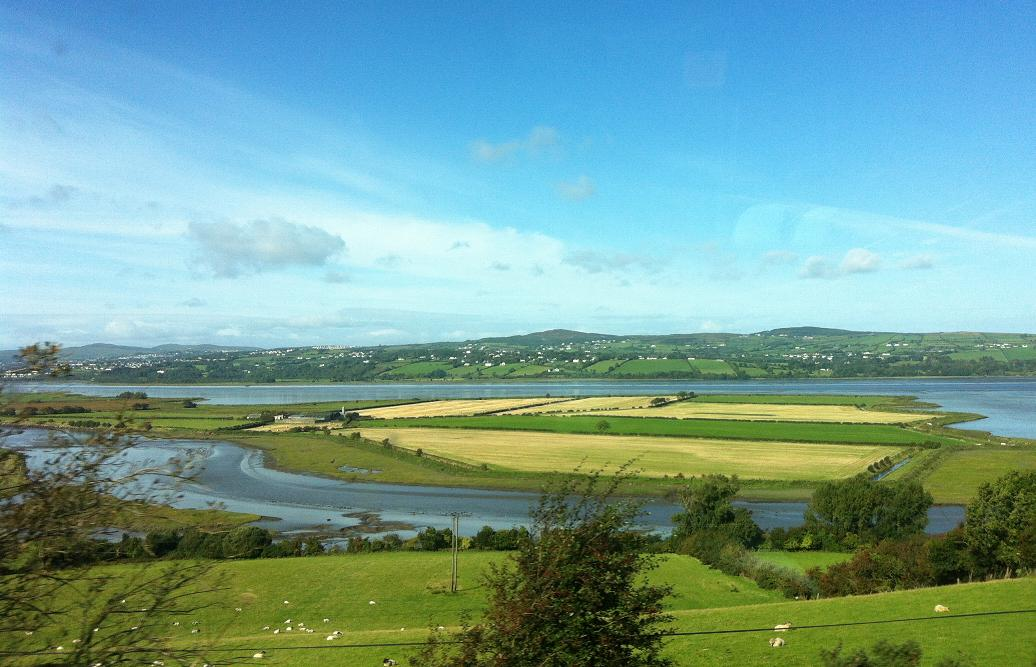
- The mouth of the River Swilly near Letterkenny
- Native name: An tSúileach

Location
- Country: Ireland

Physical characteristics
- Source
  - location: Glendore Mountain, County Donegal
  - elevation: ~15.2 m (50 ft)
- Mouth
  - location: Atlantic Ocean at Lough Swilly
- Length: ~41.8 km (26.0 miles)

The River Swilly (Irish: An tSúileach) is a river in County Donegal, Ireland, which flows in an easterly direction through Letterkenny. The town became the river's first crossing point in the 17th century.

== Name ==
The river takes its name Súileach ('sharp sighted' or 'seeing one'), a multi-eyed man-eating water monster that was reputedly killed by Saint Columba. Letterkenny DJ and producer Diarmuid O'Doherty produced a song, "A Monster in the River Swilly", about this legend.

== Course ==
The River Swilly rises near Glendore, a mountain in County Donegal, and flows for around 41.8 km (26 mi), flowing through Letterkenny, before flowing into the Atlantic Ocean at Lough Swilly. A number of 'burns' flow into the river throughout its course. These include the Forglug Burn, which flows into the river just to the south of Conwal Cemetery, and the Correnagh Burn, which flows under the Derry Road (part of the N56), entering the river at Bonagee on the eastern edge of Letterkenny.

== Navigation and use ==
A shipping industry once operated on the Swilly in Letterkenny. The river was extremely hard for larger ships to navigate, as it was narrow and has many bends near Letterkenny. The port was closed to commercial shipping in the 1960s and its warehouses were demolished in 2001. The coal yard still remains on the old site opposite the Errigal Hotel. Newmills Corn and Flax Mills is powered by the waters of the river.

=== Fishing ===
The Swilly traditionally produced approximately 300–400 salmon per year. The heaviest salmon recorded weighed 11 kilograms (24 lb); a sea trout of 5.5 kilograms (12 lb) was also recorded.

== Crossings ==
The Swilly is spanned by numerous bridges mostly open to road traffic. In Letterkenny there are four bridges across the river:

Bridge	Image
Oldtown Bridge	
Port Bridge	
Rail Bridge	
Devlin Way	

=== Devlin Way ===
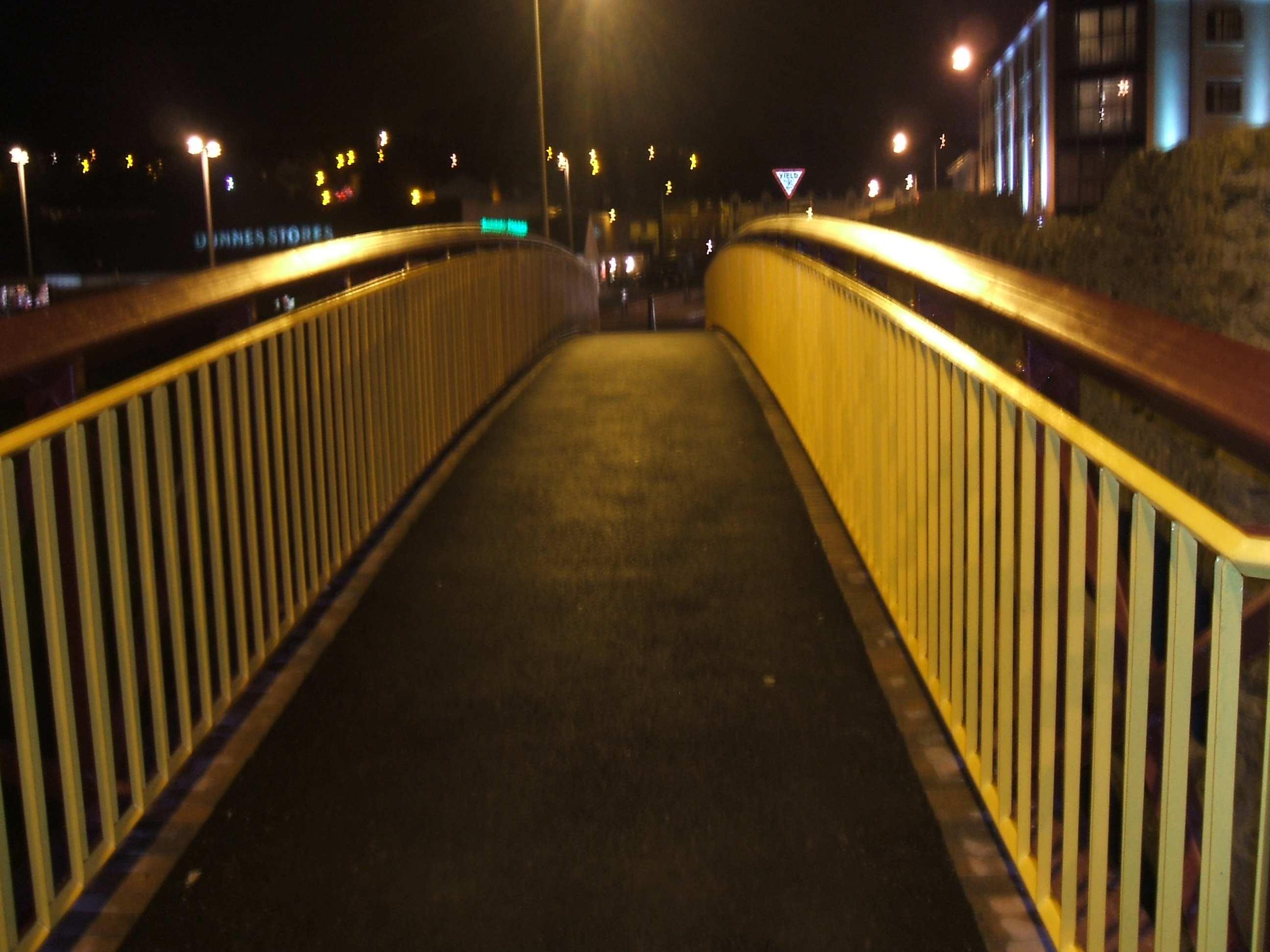
Devlin Way at night

Devlin Way, the first pedestrian bridge built over the River Swilly, was opened in Letterkenny in November 2006. It connects the suburban Oldtown area with the town centre. The bridge was designed by TS McLaughlin Structural Engineers and the ironwork was constructed by Bonnar Engineering. It cost €100,000 to construct. A maroon-coloured cambered steel structure which measures 28 metres long and 2.2 metres wide, the bridge is lit by a lamp cast from iron and contains a commemorative stone seat with a plaque. The bridge is a neighbour to the much older Oldtown Bridge. The bridge is named in honour of the Devlin family who live beside the bridge and gave part of their land so that the bridge could be built.
