= Tory Island =

Island off County Donegal, Ireland

Toraigh Tory Island
- Island
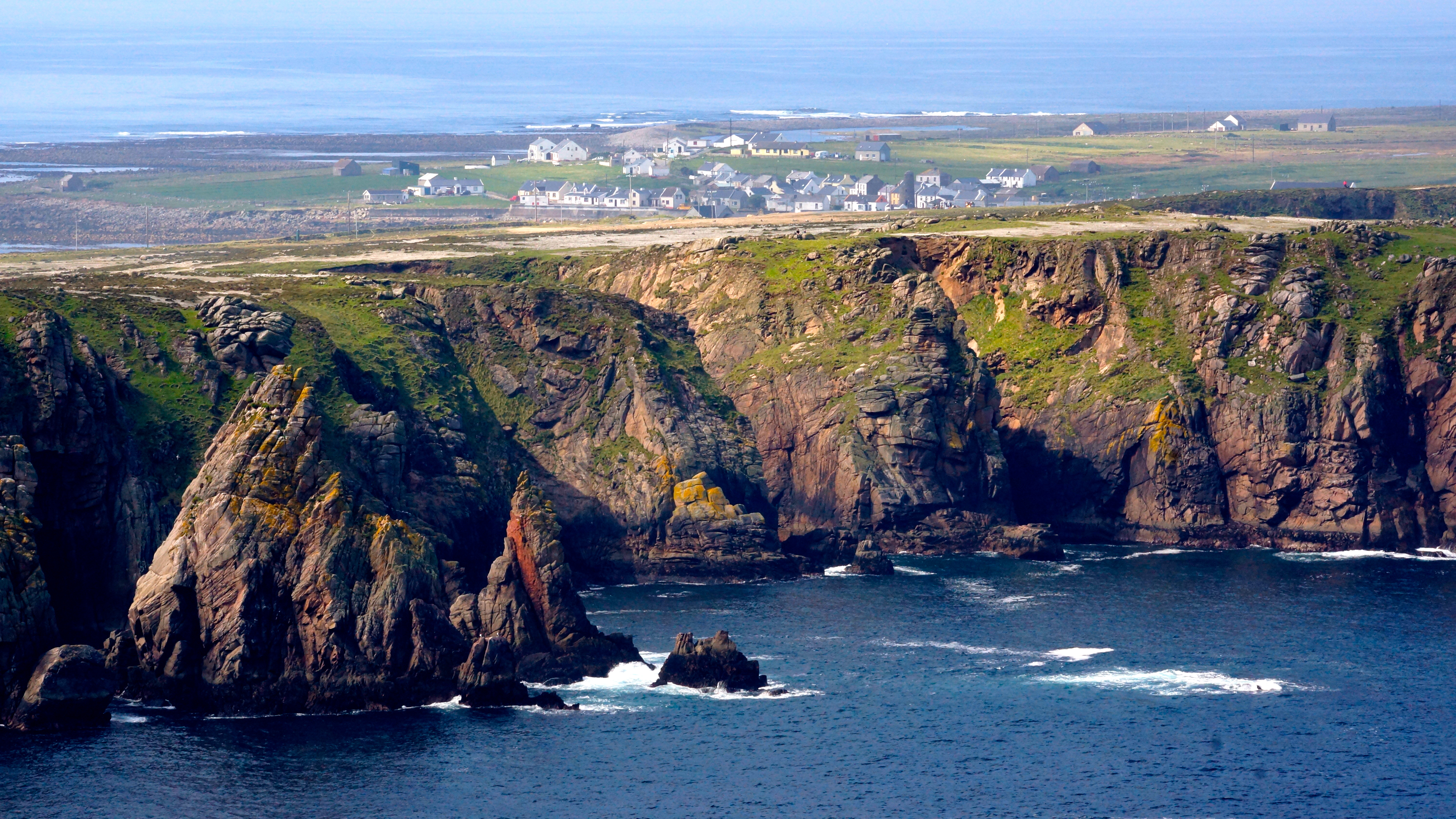
- Aerial view of Tory Island

- Location in Ireland
- Coordinates: 55°15′45″N 8°13′00″W
- Country: Ireland
- Province: Ulster
- County: County Donegal

Government
  - Dáil Éireann: Donegal

Area
  - Total: 3.5816 km^{2} (1.3829 sq mi)

Population (2022)
  - Total: 141
  - Density: 39.4/km^{2} (102/sq mi)
- Time zone: UTC+0 (WET)
  - Summer (DST): UTC-1 (IST (WEST))
- Area codes: 074, +353 74
- Irish Grid Reference: B853466
- Website: toryisland.ie
- As this is a Gaeltacht, Toraigh is the only official name.

Tory Island, or simply Tory, is an island 11 kilometres (6 nautical miles) off the north-west coast of County Donegal in the north-west of Ulster, the northern province in Ireland. It is officially known by its Irish name Toraigh. It is the most remote inhabited island of Ireland. The name toraigh means "place of steep rocky heights".

== Language ==
The main spoken language on the island is Irish, although English is spoken as well, to communicate with visitors. Tory is part of the Donegal Gaeltacht, and Ulster Irish (Gaeilge Uladh) is the main Irish dialect in use.

== Geography and transport ==
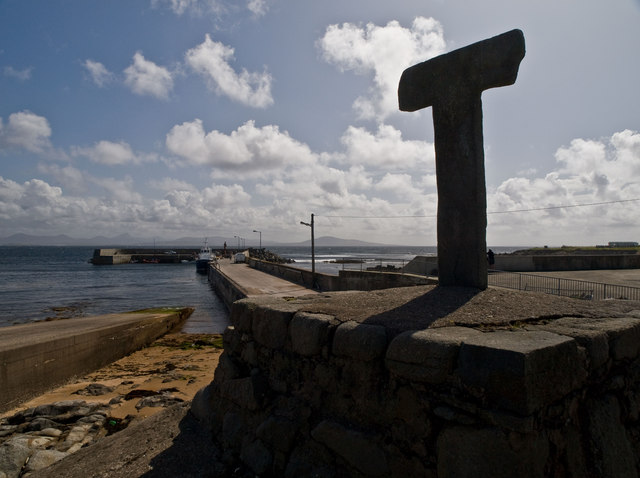
Tau cross. One of only two tau crosses left in Ireland

The island is approximately five kilometres (three miles) long and 1 kilometre (0.6 miles) wide, with an area of 3.581 km^{2} (885 acres). The 2022 census recorded a population of 141, an increase from the 2016 population of 119. The population is distributed among four towns: An Baile Thoir (East Town), An Baile Thiar (West Town), An Lár (Middletown) and Úrbaile (Newtown). Petrol and diesel are available from Tory Oil at prices significantly higher than on the mainland.

Tory has no airport, but it has regular ferry connections from mainland County Donegal. The ferry operates daily all year round. It does not take cars, but holds up to 70 passengers. During the winter months, ferry crossings may not be possible on some days due to rough seas. However, between November and March a four-seater helicopter operates every other Thursday between Falcarragh and Tory.

Power on the island is generated by three diesel electricity generators. These have a total capacity of 4 MW and burn through approximately 500 litres of fuel every day.

== History ==
=== Ancient history ===
In the apocryphal history of Ireland, Lebor Gabála Érenn, Tory Island was the site of Conand's Tower, the stronghold of the Fomorians, before they were defeated by the Nemedians in a great battle on the island. The later Fomorian king, Balor of the evil eye, also lived here. Balor would imprison Ethlinn in a tower built atop Tor Mór (or Túr Mór in Old Irish, meaning The High Tower). Tor Mór is the island's highest point.

A monastery was founded on Tory in the 6th century by Colmcille. The monastery dominated life on the island until 1595, when it was plundered and destroyed by English troops, who were waging a war of suppression against local chieftains. (The monastery's bell tower, built in the 6th or 7th century, is the largest structure to have survived.)

=== Early modern history ===
In 1608, in what is known as the Siege of Tory Island (one of the final incidents of O'Doherty's Rebellion), a group of the surviving rebels took shelter in the castle on the island, but began killing each other in hopes of securing a pardon.

The final action in the Irish Rebellion of 1798, the naval Battle of Tory Island, took place in the sea just off the island.

=== Recent history ===
==== WW1 sinking of HMS Audacious ====
The first battleship the British lost during the First World War, the super-dreadnought HMS Audacious (23,400 tons), was sunk off Tory Island on 27 October 1914 by a naval mine that had been laid by the armed German merchant-cruiser Berlin. The loss was kept an official secret in Britain until 14 November 1918 (three days after the end of the war). The sinking was witnessed and photographed by passengers on RMS Olympic, the sister ship of RMS Titanic.

==== Community of artists ====
Since the 1950s, the island has been home to a small community of artists, and has its own art gallery. The English artist Derek Hill (1916–2000) was associated with the Tory artist community.

==== King of Toraigh ====
The late "King of Tory", Patsy Dan Rodgers (d. 2018), waiting near the harbour to welcome visitors to the island

In keeping with a long-standing tradition, a "king" is chosen by consensus of the islanders. The most recent "King of Tory" (in Irish, Rí Thoraí) was the painter Patsy Dan Rodgers (Patsaí Dan Mac Ruaidhrí), who held the post from the 1990s until his death on 19 October 2018. The king has no legal power, but has duties that include acting as a spokesperson for the island community and welcoming people to the island.

==== Damaged structures ====
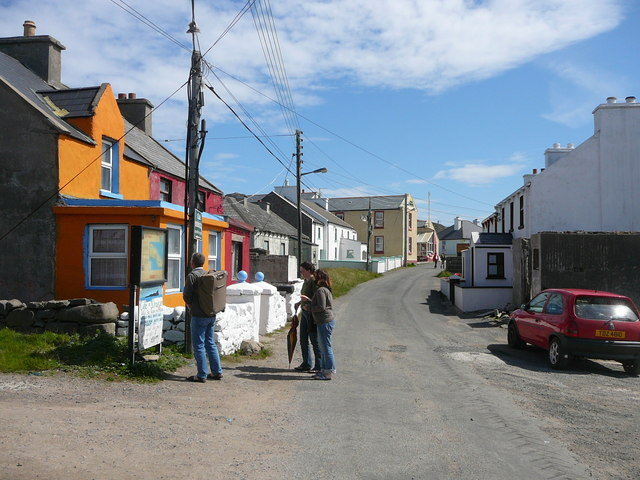
Looking east along the village street, West Town

In 2009, the island gained attention from several news outlets when a resident was awarded damages against a neighbour for demolition and removal of his house in 1993. The house had gradually disappeared over a nine-month period, while the owner worked in New Zealand. On his return, and with the house completely removed and replaced with a car park, his questions and the subsequent investigations by the police were reportedly met with a "wall of silence" from other residents. The story was featured in a book in 2012 written by Anton McCabe and a BBC podcast in 2021, both titled "The House That Vanished"

In 2015, the island's only café was destroyed by fire.

== Demographics ==
The table below reports data on Tory Island's population, taken from Discover the Islands of Ireland (Alex Ritsema, Collins Press, 1999) and from the census of Ireland. Censuses in Ireland before 1841 are not considered complete or reliable.

Historical population

Year	Pop.	±%
1841	399	—
1851	402	+0.8%
1861	386	−4.0%
1871	343	−11.1%
1881	332	−3.2%
1891	348	+4.8%
1901	335	−3.7%
1911	307	−8.4%
1926	250	−18.6%

Year	Pop.	±%
1936	291	+16.4%
1946	265	−8.9%
1951	257	−3.0%
1956	273	+6.2%
1961	264	−3.3%
1966	243	−8.0%
1971	273	+12.3%
1979	213	−22.0%
1981	208	−2.3%

Year	Pop.	±%
1986	136	−34.6%
1991	119	−12.5%
1996	169	+42.0%
2002	133	−21.3%
2006	142	+6.8%
2011	144	+1.4%
2016	119	−17.4%
2022	141	+18.5%

== Tourism ==
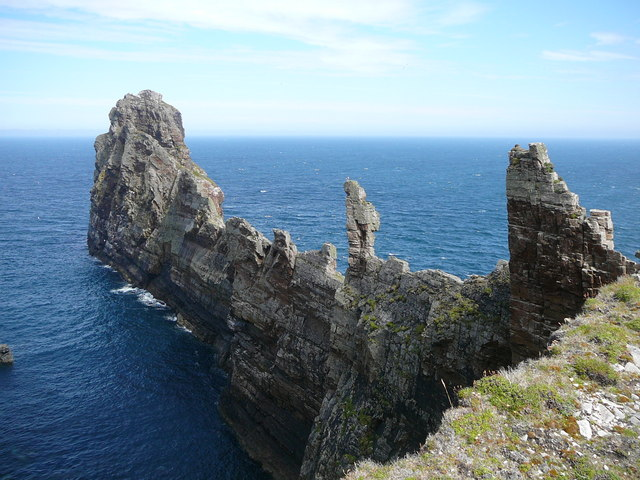
An Tor Mór

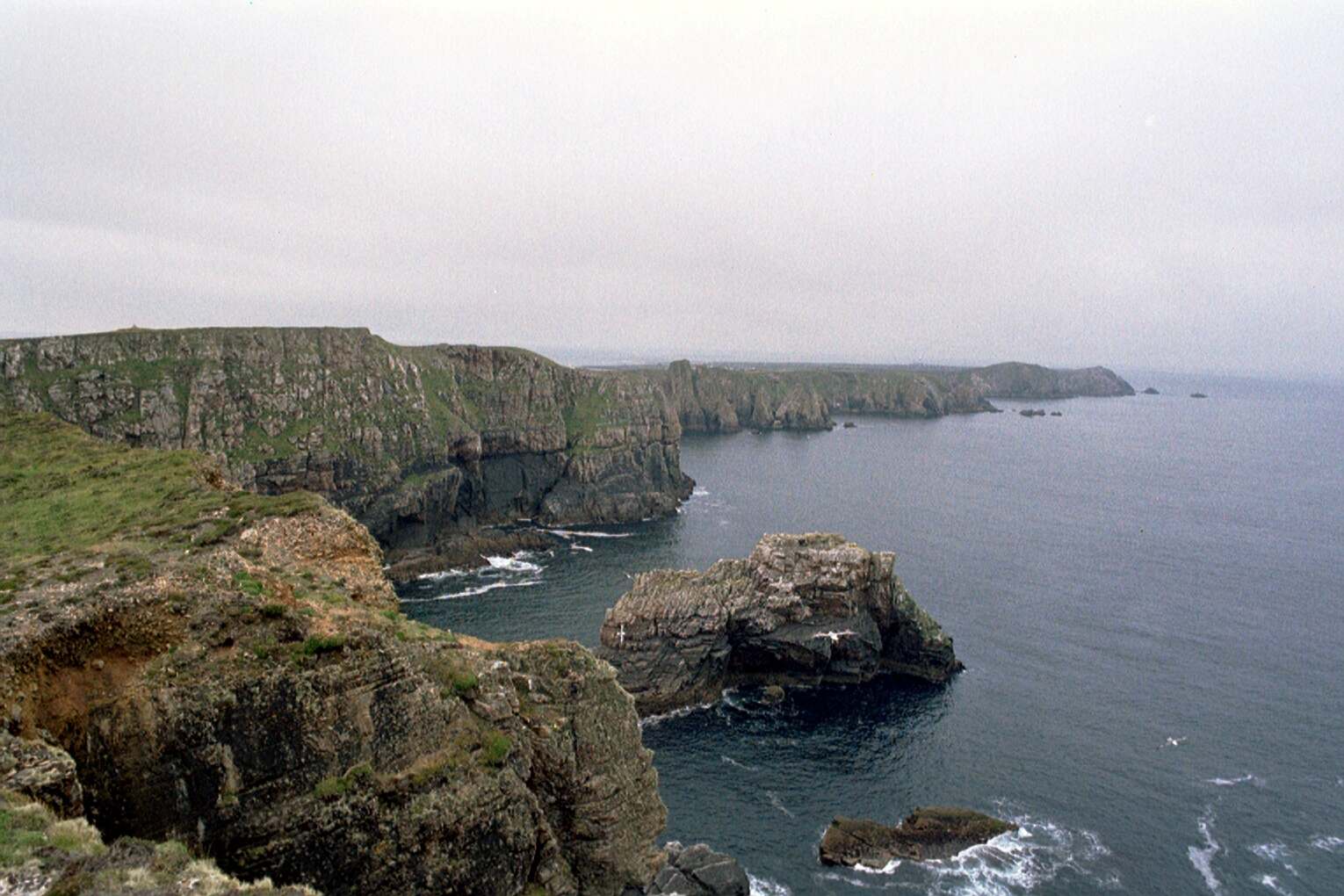
View from Dún Bhaloir

Tory Island has a number of sites connected with historical events and island mythology:

- Dún Bhaloir (“Balor's Fort”) is located on the island's eastern side, on a peninsula surrounded on three sides by 90-metre-high (295-foot) cliffs. The fort is accessible only by crossing a narrow isthmus that is defended by four earthen embankments.
- An Eochair Mhór (the “Big Key”) is a long, steep-sided spur jutting from the east side of the peninsula and ending in a crag called An Tor Mór (the “Big Rock” or the “Big Tower”). The spur has prominent rocky pinnacles known as “Balor's soldiers” (Saighdiúirí Bhaloir). They give the spur a 'toothed' appearance, helping to inspire the name “the Big Key”.
- The Wishing Stone is a precipitous, flat-topped rock alongside the northern cliff-face of Balor's Fort. Traditionally, a wish is granted to anyone foolhardy enough to step onto the rock, and also to anyone who succeeds in throwing three stones onto it.
- An Cloigtheach (the “Bell Tower”) is the largest structure to have survived the 16th-century destruction of the monastery (see history section above). The round tower was built in the 6th or 7th century.
- The Tau Cross (a T-shaped cross) is believed to date from the 12th century. It is one of only two Tau crosses in Ireland (the other is in Kilnaboy, County Clare).
- Móirsheisear (“Grave of the Seven”): Móirsheisear (which literally means “big six”, but is nevertheless a term signifying seven) is the tomb of seven people, six men and one woman, who drowned when their boat capsized off Scoilt an Mhóirsheisear (the “Cleft of the Seven”) on the island's northwest coast. According to local superstition, clay from the woman's grave has the power to ward off vermin.
- The Lighthouse, standing at the west end of the island, was built between 1828 and 1832 based on a design by George Halpin, a noted designer of Irish lighthouses. In April 1990, the lighthouse was automated. It is one of three lighthouses in Ireland into which a reference station for the Differential Global Positioning System (DGPS) has been installed. The lighthouse is at coordinates 55°16.357′N 8°14.964′W
- The Torpedo: A torpedo can be seen midway between An Baile Thiar and An Baile Thoir. It washed ashore during World War II and was then defused and moved to its present location.

== Flora and fauna ==
The island is a designated “Important Bird Area”. It is a breeding site for corn crakes (Crex crex), a globally threatened species whose numbers have fallen as agriculture has intensified. In 2007, Tory Island recorded 18 calling males, down from a recorded maximum of 34 calling males in 2003. In 2010, numbers dropped down further to 10. In addition to its indigenous birdlife, the island records many vagrants.

Ancient records of the flora and fauna of this island can be found in Hyndman's notes on the history of the island. Algae found locally include: Fucus vesiculosus, Fucus nodosus, Himanthalia lorea, Laminaria digitata, Rhodomenia laciniata, Plocamium coccineum, Ptilota plumosa, Conferva rupestrus, Codium tomentosum, Codium adhaerens det Dr Harvey.

Because of its high winds, the island has no trees.

Tory Island Cattle are a rare breed of cattle from Tory Island.

== See also ==
- List of abbeys and priories in County Donegal
