= The Bear's Island =

- Created by: Jacques Peyrache
- Voices of: Kelvine Dumour, Vincent Violette
- Original language: French
- No. of episodes: 26

Production
- Producer: Pixibox
- Running time: 10 minutes

Original release
- Release: 1 June – 23 November 1992

The Bear's Island (French: L'Île aux Ours) is a French animated television series produced by Pixibox and first aired in 1992. It was one of the first animated series which heavily involved computer animation.

== Plot ==
Eddie is a white bear with a mask that lives on Rabbit's Island. One day a little ghost named OC tells him that he is a bear and about the Island of the Bears. He leaves in a balloon with his friend Max (a rabbit), and OC, in search of the Bear's Island.

== Characters ==
=== Protagonists ===
- Eddie - a white bear wearing a mask.
- Little Max - Eddie's rabbit friend.
- OC - a green ghost that lives in a bottle.
- Pink Baron - a bull dressed in pink airplane pilot clothing, flying a pink biplane, a parody of the Red Baron.

=== Antagonists ===
- Storm Bird - he is the first villain of the four they meet. This takes place in the clouds. He plays the organ and divides into a flock of grey birds when he moves.
- Siren Lodine - she lives on an iceberg. She moves in a bathtub carried by servants when she is out of the water.
- Witch Marveline - she lives in a volcano. She was the most determined to stop Eddie because of a prophecy. This prophecy says that the power of the four elements would be lost if something happened with Bear's Island. It is possible that they made the island disappear because of this prophecy. From the start of the series, she monitors them and causes trouble.
- Tropical Monkey He has a personal army of creatures called Vampire Dragons. He lived in the jungle and represents industrialization and pollution. He was building a fleet of aircraft in a bizarre series and throws acid.
- Pirates - crocodile-like pirates that move using flying ships.
- Doctor Craignus - a canine doctor which wants to create the "elixir of cruelty", which turns the creatures injected with it evil.
- Retoj and Chjenocs - the henchmen of Dr Craignus.

== Influence ==
The series had a notable nostalgic resurfacing in the Polish internet in 2011, after a Polish 90s nostalgia website, Karawana.eu published an article about it, highlighting it's aesthetics, worldbuilding and plot, which the users remembered as off-putting and creepy.
