= Oscar Wilde Centre =

Unit of Trinity College Dublin, Ireland

Coordinates: 53°20′40″N 6°15′30″W

The Oscar Wilde Centre is an academic research and teaching unit in Trinity College Dublin. It was founded in 1998, and is located at 21 Westland Row, the house in which Oscar Wilde was born. This building, which is on the perimeter of Trinity, was purchased in the 20th century as part of an expansion programme. The centre offers two post-graduate programmes: the MPhil in Irish writing, and another in creative writing – the first programme of its kind in Ireland. The centre was founded by the poets Brendan Kennelly and Gerald Dawe, who serves as the director. Richard Ford, a Pulitzer Prize-winning American writer, joined the staff in 2008 as an adjunct professor.

Since 2007 the centre also administers the Rooney Prize for Irish Literature, an annual prize for an Irish writer under 40.
