= Moneymore (disambiguation) =

Moneymore is a village in County Londonderry, Northern Ireland.

Moneymore may also refer to:

- Moneymore, Drogheda, a housing estate in Drogheda, Ireland
- Moneymore, New Zealand, a farming district near Milton, New Zealand
- Moneymore, Ontario, a community in Tweed, Ontario, Canada
