= Drogheda =

Town in County Louth, Ireland, with suburbs in County Meath

Drogheda Droichead Átha (Irish)
- Town
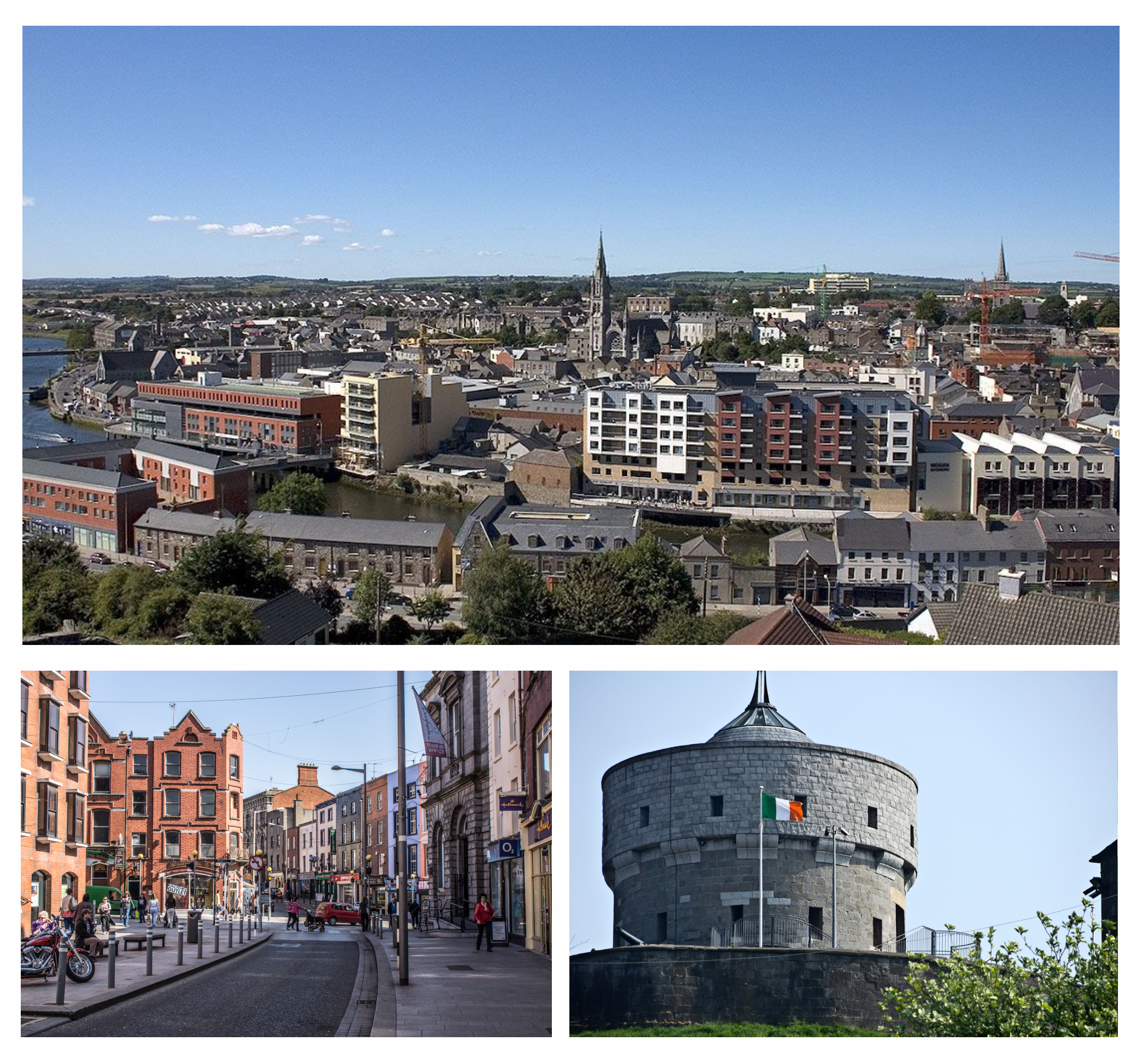
- Clockwise from top: Drogheda viewed from the south; Millmount Fort; West Street, Drogheda

- Flag Coat of arms
- Motto: "God Our Strength, Merchandise Our Glory."
- Location in Ireland Drogheda (Europe)
- Coordinates: 53.7150°N 6.3525°W
- Country: Ireland
- Province: Leinster
- County: County Louth and County Meath
- Municipal district: Drogheda Borough District
- Founded: 911 AD
- First Norman Charter Drogheda-in-Meath: 1194
- County Status: 1412 (abolished 1898)

Government
  - Dáil constituency: Louth
  - EU Parliament: Midlands–North-West

Area
  - Total: 14.8 km^{2} (5.7 sq mi)
- Highest elevation: 27 m (89 ft)
- Lowest elevation: 1 m (3.3 ft)

Population (2022 census)
  - Total: 44,135
  - Rank: 6th
  - Density: 2,776.6/km^{2} (7,191/sq mi)
  - Greater area: 83,000
- Demonyms: Droghedean, Boynesider
- Time zone: UTC±0 (WET)
  - Summer (DST): UTC+1 (IST)
- Eircode routing key: A92
- Telephone area code: +353(0)41

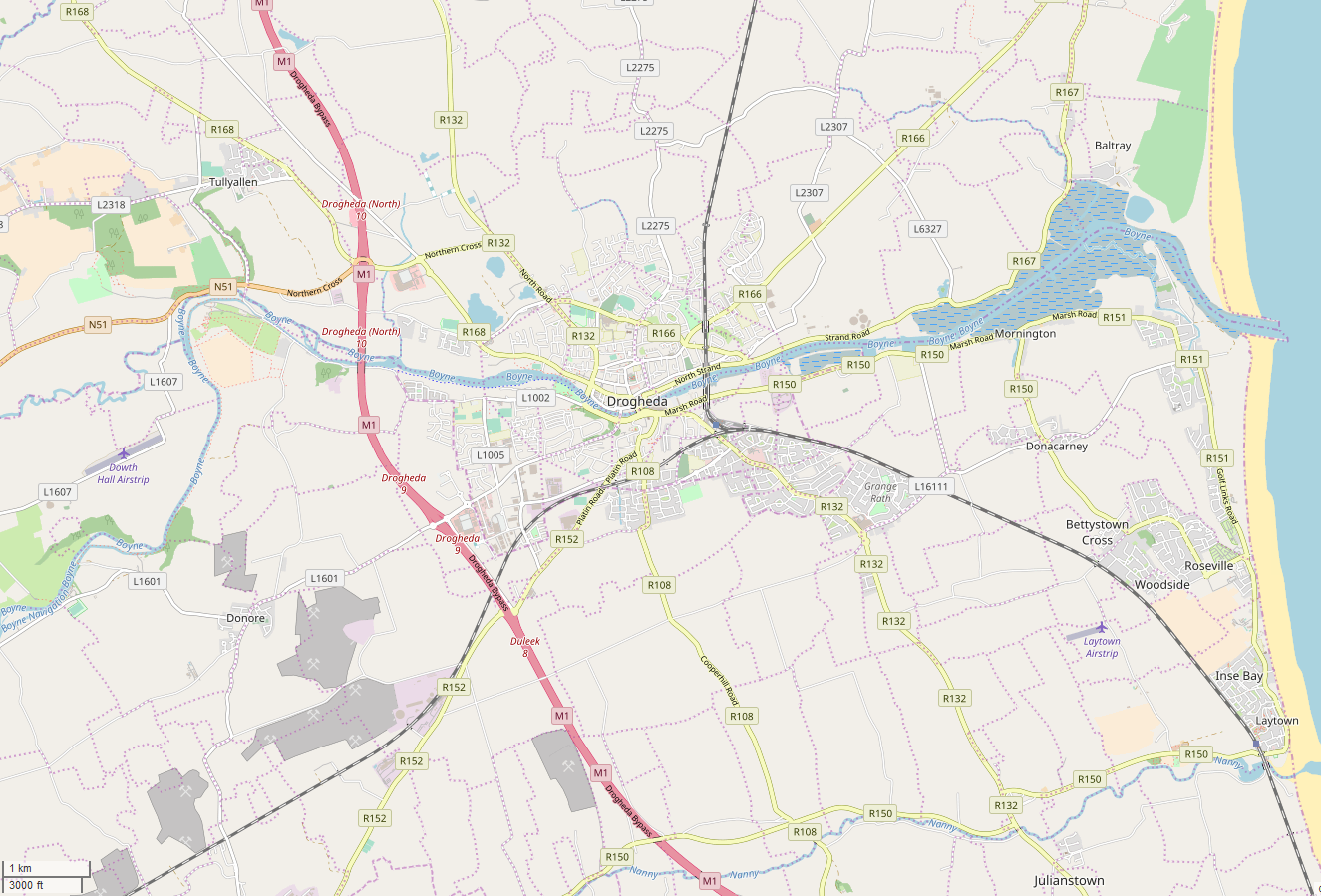
Map of Drogheda

Drogheda (/ˈdrɒhədə, ˈdrɔːdə/ DRO-həd-ə, DRAW-də; Irish: Droichead Átha [ˈd̪ˠɾˠɛhəd̪ˠ ˈaːhə], meaning "bridge at the ford") is an industrial and port town in County Louth on the east coast of Ireland, 43 km (27 mi) north of Dublin. It is located on the Dublin–Belfast corridor on the east coast of Ireland, mostly in County Louth but with the south fringes of the town in County Meath, 40 km (25 mi) north of Dublin city centre. Drogheda had a population of 44,135 inhabitants in 2022, making it the eleventh largest settlement by population in all of Ireland, and the largest town in the Republic of Ireland, (Note: Tallaght, which also does not have city status, has about 20,000 more inhabitants than Drogheda although whether or not it can be considered a town is up for debate.) by both population and area. The area of Drogheda that is in Co. Louth has 35,990 residents, while the area of Drogheda that is in Co. Meath has 8,145 residents, which make up the 44,135 total. It is the last bridging point on the River Boyne before it enters the Irish Sea. The UNESCO World Heritage Site of Newgrange is located 8 km (5.0 mi) west of the town.

== Area ==
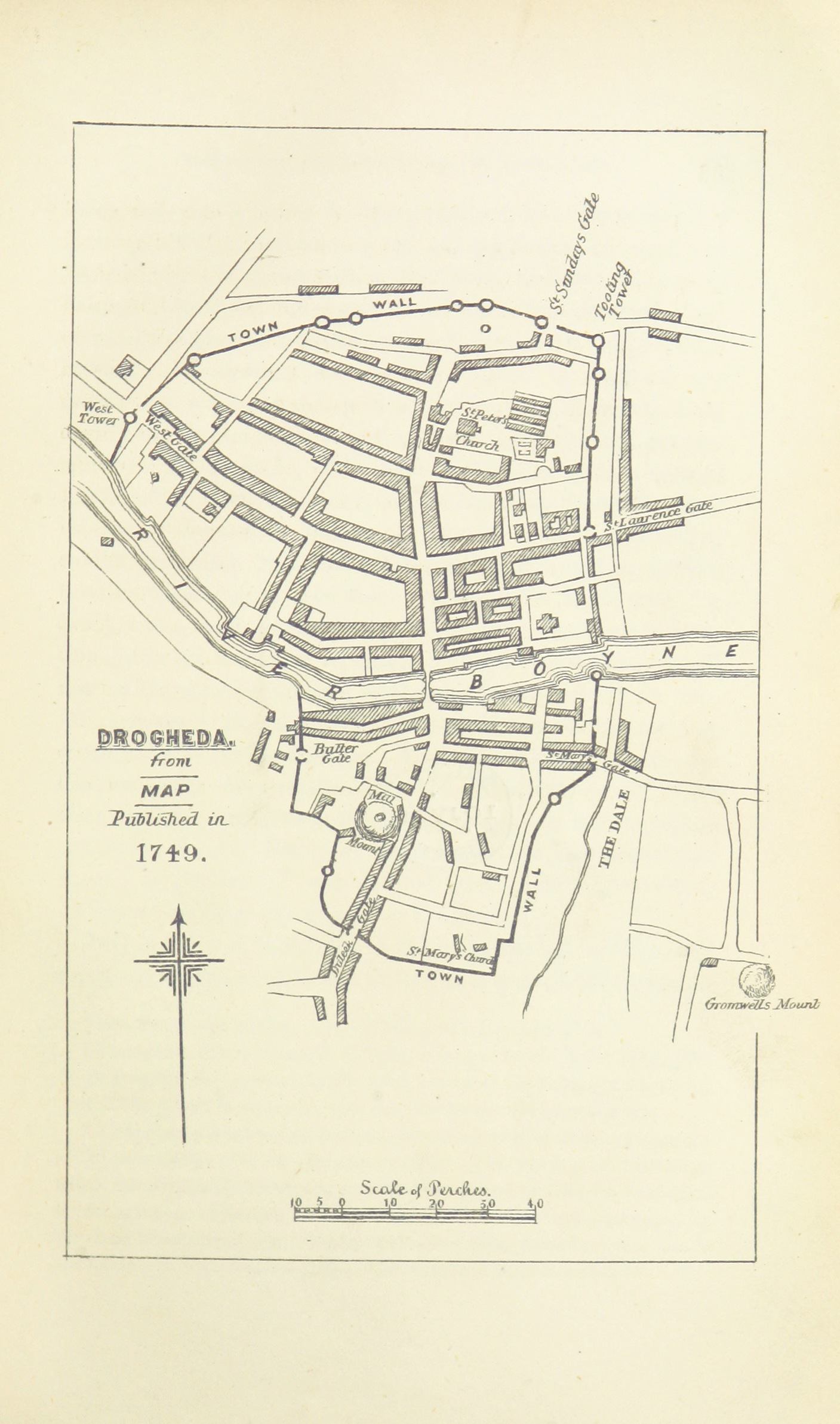
Drogheda, 1749

Drogheda was founded as two separately administered towns in two different territories: Drogheda-in-Meath (i.e. the Lordship and Liberty of Meath, from which a charter was granted in 1194), and Drogheda-in-Oriel (or 'Uriel', as County Louth was then known). The division came from the twelfth-century boundary between two Irish kingdoms, colonised by different Norman interests, just as the River Boyne continues to divide the town between the dioceses of Armagh and Meath. In 1412, these two towns were united, and Drogheda became a county corporate, styled as "the County of the Town of Drogheda". Drogheda continued as a county borough until the establishment of county councils under the Local Government (Ireland) Act 1898, which saw all of Drogheda, including a large area south of the Boyne, become part of an extended County Louth. With the passing of the County of Louth and Borough of Drogheda (Boundaries) Provisional Order 1976, County Louth again grew larger at the expense of County Meath. The boundary was further altered in 1994 by the Local Government (Boundaries) (Town Elections) Regulations 1994. The 2007–2013 Meath County Development Plan recognises the Meath environs of Drogheda as a primary growth centre on a par with Navan.

== History ==
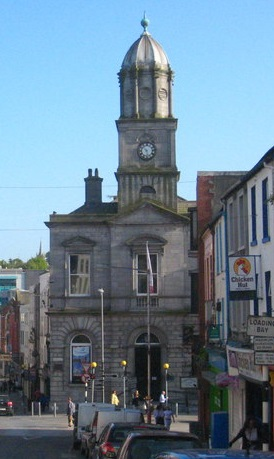
The Tholsel

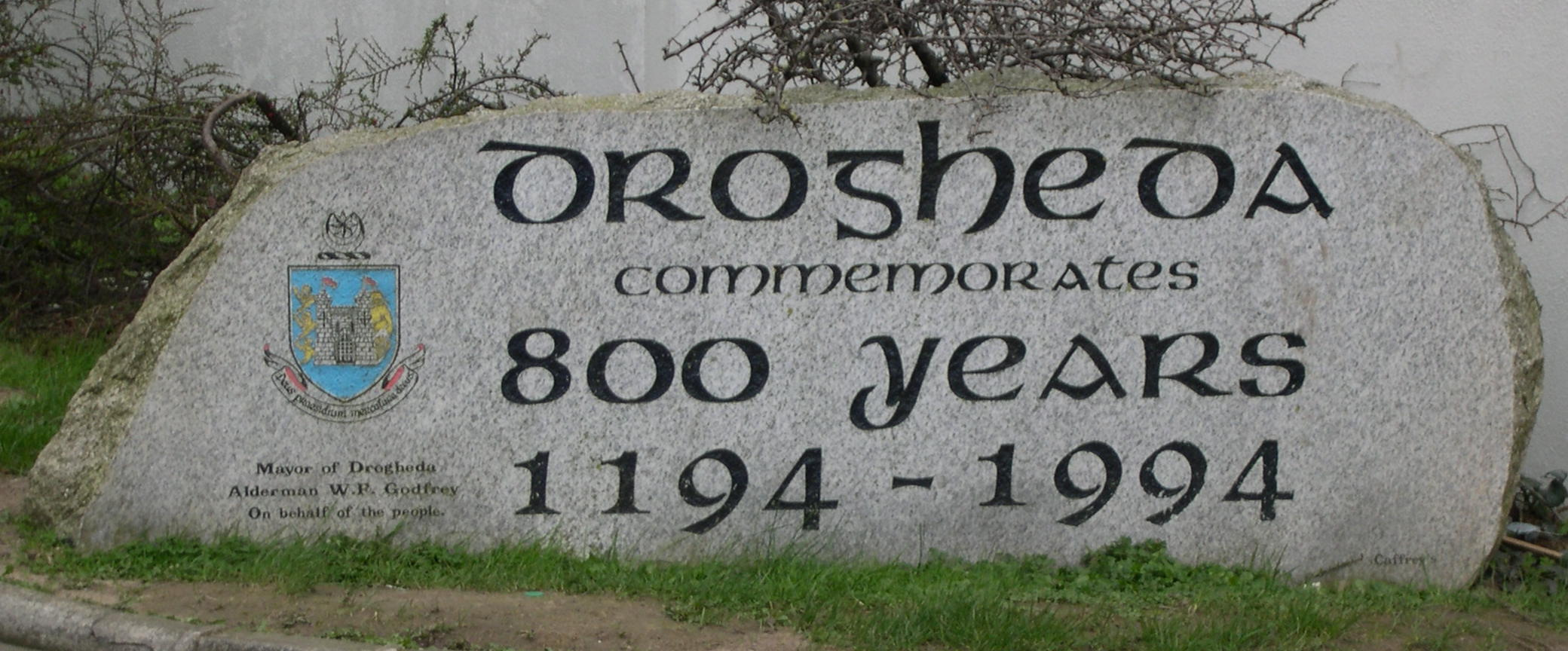
Commemoration of Official Charter

=== Hinterland ===
Historical population
| Year | Pop. | ±% |
|---|---|---|
| 1811 | 15,590 | — |
| 1813 | 16,123 | +3.4% |
| 1821 | 18,118 | +12.4% |
| 1831 | 17,365 | −4.2% |
| 1841 | 17,300 | −0.4% |
| 1851 | 16,810 | −2.8% |
| 1861 | 14,722 | −12.4% |
| 1871 | 13,510 | −8.2% |
| 1881 | 12,297 | −9.0% |
| 1891 | 11,873 | −3.4% |
| 1901 | 12,760 | +7.5% |
| 1911 | 12,501 | −2.0% |
| 1926 | 12,716 | +1.7% |
| 1936 | 14,494 | +14.0% |
| 1946 | 15,715 | +8.4% |
| 1951 | 16,779 | +6.8% |
| 1956 | 17,008 | +1.4% |
| 1961 | 17,085 | +0.5% |
| 1966 | 17,908 | +4.8% |
| 1971 | 20,095 | +12.2% |
| 1981 | 23,615 | +17.5% |
| 1986 | 24,681 | +4.5% |
| 1991 | 24,656 | −0.1% |
| 1996 | 25,282 | +2.5% |
| 2002 | 31,020 | +22.7% |
| 2006 | 35,090 | +13.1% |
| 2011 | 38,578 | +9.9% |
| 2016 | 40,956 | +6.2% |
| 2022 | 44,135 | +7.8% |

The town is situated in an area which contains a number of archaeological monuments dating from the Neolithic period onwards, of which the large passage tombs of Newgrange, Knowth, and Dowth are probably the best known. The density of archaeological sites of the prehistoric and early Christian periods uncovered in the course of ongoing developments, (including during construction of the Northern Motorway or 'Drogheda Bypass'), has shown that the hinterland of Drogheda has been a settled landscape for millennia.

=== Town beginnings ===
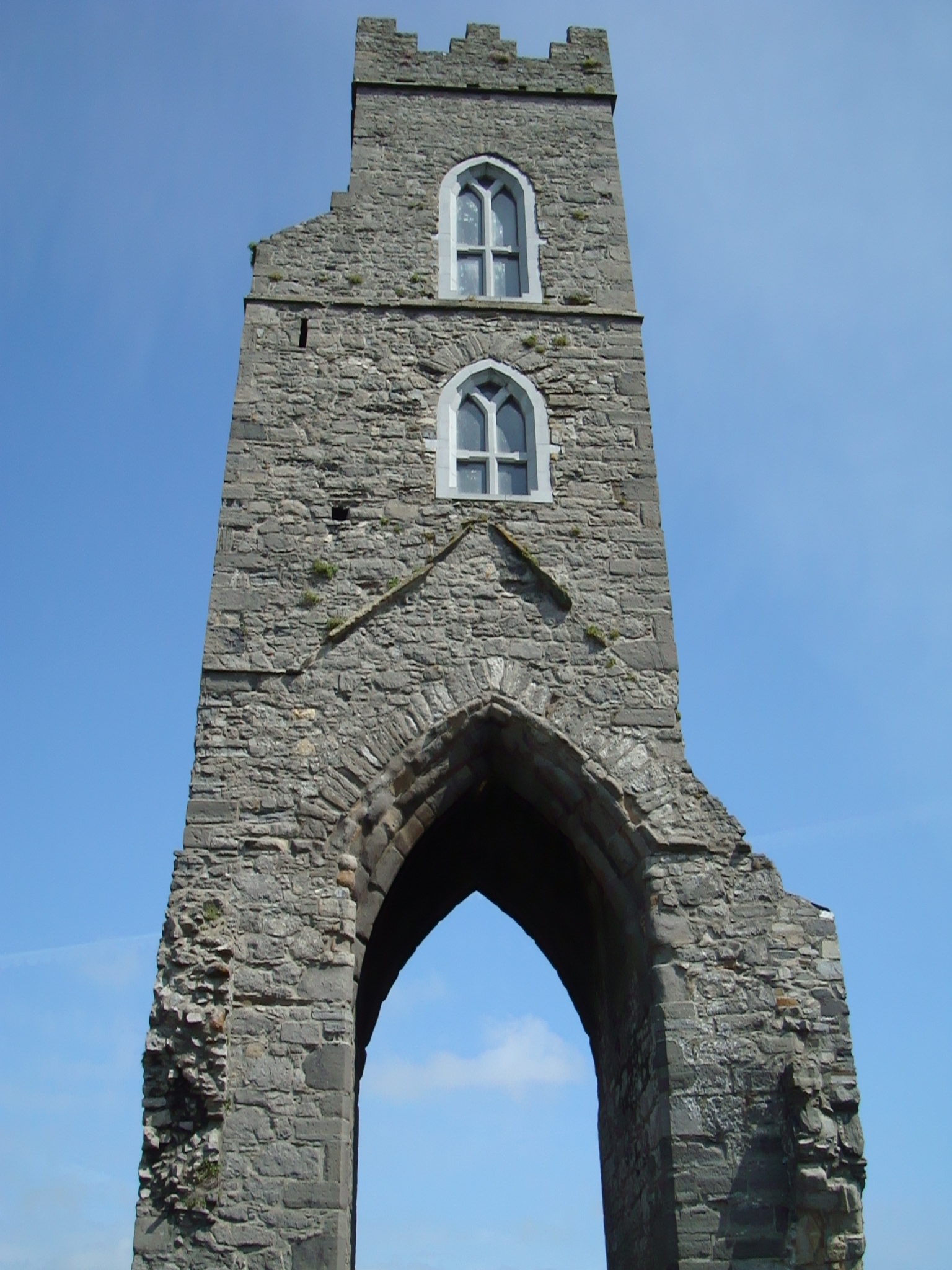
St Mary Magdalene Friary.

Despite local tradition linking Millmount to Amergin Glúingel, in his 1978 study of the history and archaeology of the town, John Bradley stated that "neither the documentary nor the archaeological evidence indicates that there was any settlement at the town prior to the coming of the Normans". The results of a number of often large-scale excavations carried out within the area of the medieval town appear to confirm this statement.

One of the earliest structures in the town is the motte-and-bailey castle, now known as Millmount Fort, which overlooks the town from a bluff on the south bank of the Boyne and which was probably erected by the Norman Lord of Meath, Hugh de Lacy, sometime before 1186. The wall on the east side of Rosemary Lane, a back-lane which runs from St. Laurence Street towards the Augustinian Church, is the oldest stone structure in Drogheda. It was completed in 1234 as the west wall of the first castle guarding access to the northern crossing point of the Boyne. A later castle, circa 1600, called Laundy's Castle stood at the junction of West Street and Peter's Street. On Meathside, the Castle of Drogheda or The Castle of Comfort was a tower house castle on the south side of the Bull Ring. It served as a prison, and as a sitting of the Irish parliament in 1494. The earliest known town charter is that granted to Drogheda-in-Meath by Walter de Lacy in 1194. In the 1600s, the name of the town was also spelled "Tredagh" in keeping with the common pronunciation, as documented by Gerard Boate in his work Irelands' Natural History. In c. 1655 it was spelled "Droghedagh" on a map by William Farriland.

Drogheda was an important walled town in the English Pale in the medieval period. It frequently hosted meetings of the Irish Parliament at that time. According to R.J. Mitchell in John Tiptoft (1427-1470), in a spill-over from the War of the Roses the Earl of Desmond and his two youngest sons (still children) were executed there on Valentine's Day 1468 on orders of the Earl of Worcester, the Lord Deputy of Ireland. It later came to light (for example in Robert Fabyan's The New Chronicles of England and France), that Elizabeth Woodville, the queen consort, was implicated in the orders given. The parliament was moved to the town in 1494 and passed Poynings' Law, the most significant legislation in Irish history, a year later. This effectively subordinated the Irish Parliament's legislative powers to the King and his English Council.

=== Later events ===
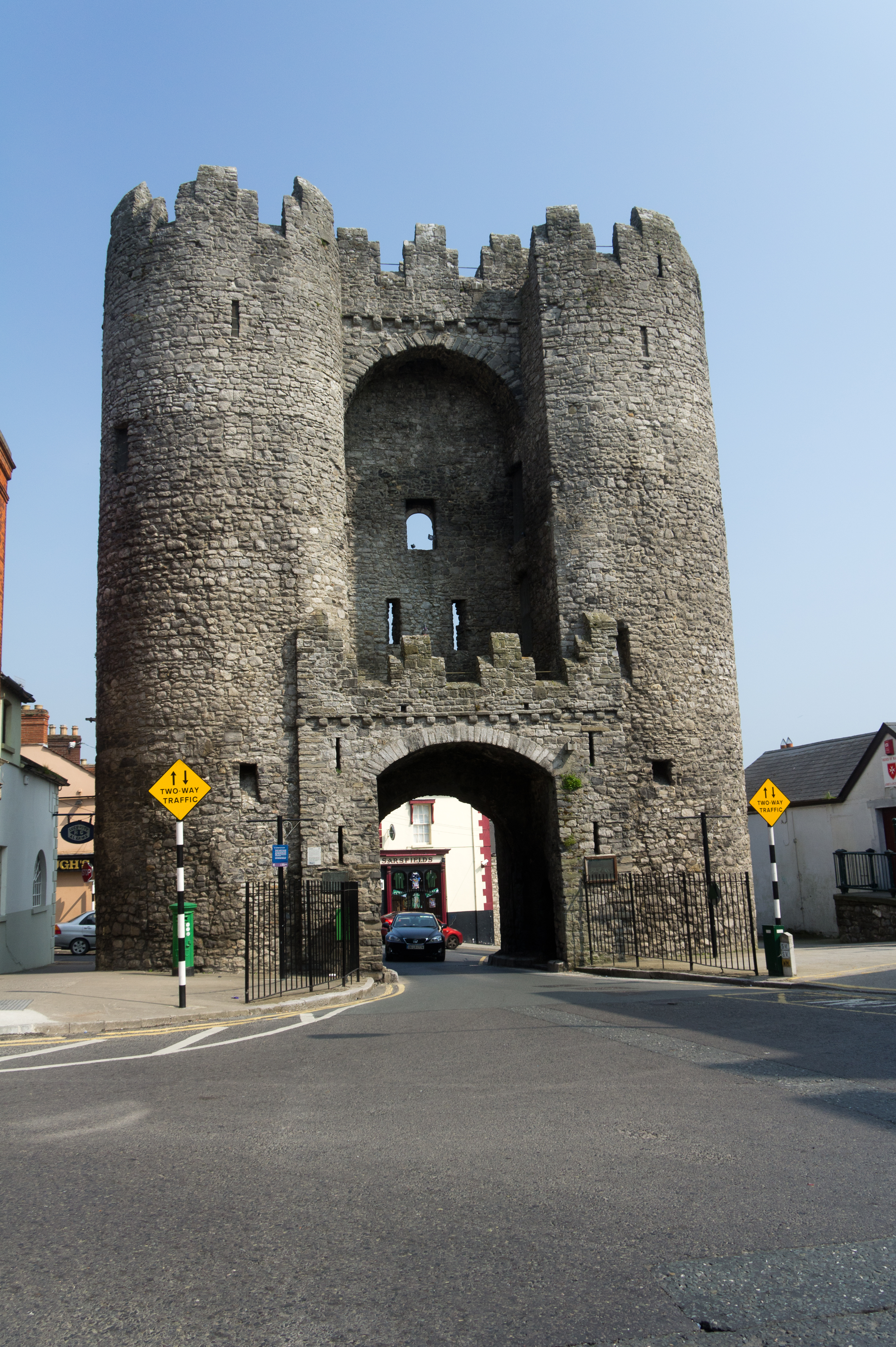
St. Laurence's Gate

The town was besieged twice during the Irish Confederate Wars.

In the second siege of Drogheda, an assault was made on the town from the south, the tall walls breached, and the town was taken by Oliver Cromwell in September 1649, as part of the Cromwellian conquest of Ireland and it was the site of a massacre of the Royalist defenders. In Cromwell's own words after the siege of Drogheda, "When they submitted, their officers were knocked on the head, and every tenth man of the soldiers killed and the rest shipped to Barbados."

In 1661, Henry Moore, 3rd Viscount Moore was created the Earl of Drogheda in the Peerage of Ireland.

The Battle of the Boyne, 1690, occurred some 6 km (3.7 mi) west of the town, on the banks of the River Boyne, at Oldbridge. The Tholsel in West Street was completed in 1770.

In 1790, Drogheda Harbour Commissioners were established by the Port of Drogheda Act 1790. They remained in place until 1997 when a commercial enterprise, the Drogheda Port Company, replaced them.

In 1826, the Drogheda Steam Packet Company was formed in the town, providing shipping services to Liverpool.

In 1837, the population of Drogheda area was 17,365 people, of whom 15,138 lived in the town.

=== Town arms ===
Drogheda's coat of arms features St. Laurence's Gate with three lions, and a ship emerging from either side of the barbican. It is blazoned as Azure per pale dimidiated, on the dexter side three lions passant guardant in pale or, on the sinister as many hulls of ships in pale of the last, surmounted by a castle with two towers triple-towered argent. The town's motto Deus praesidium, mercatura decus translates as "God our strength, merchandise our glory".

The star and crescent emblem in the crest of the coat of arms is mentioned as part of the mayor's seal by D'Alton (1844). In 2010, Irish president Mary McAleese, in a speech delivered during an official visit to Turkey, stated that the star and crescent had been added in the aftermath of the Great Famine as gratitude for food supplies donated by the Ottoman Sultan Abdülmecid I, which had arrived at Drogheda by ship.

=== 20th century ===
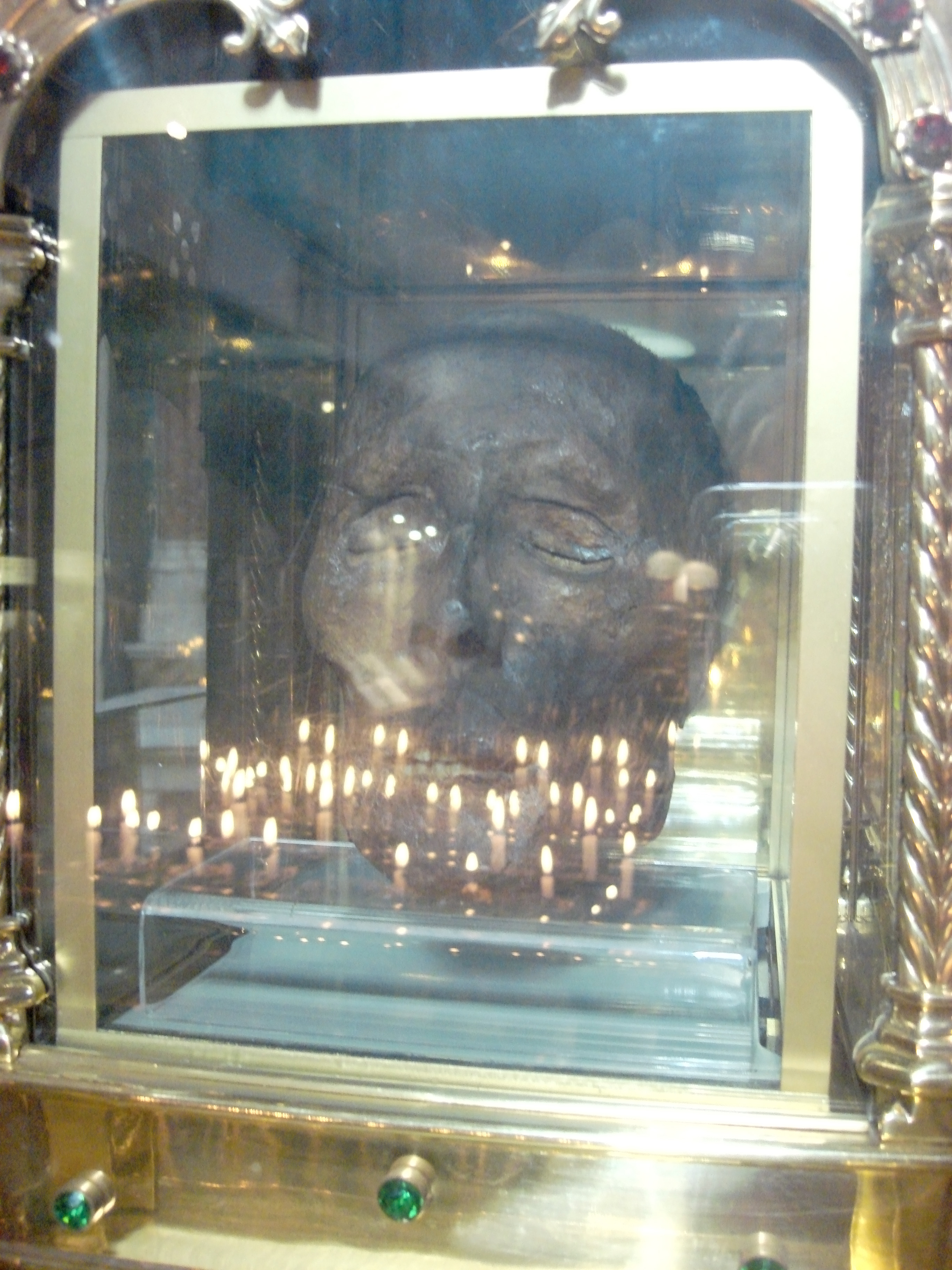
St Oliver Plunkett's Head

In 1921, the preserved severed head of Saint Oliver Plunkett, who was executed in London in 1681, was put on display in St. Peter's (Catholic) Church, where it remains today. The church is located on West Street, which is the main street in the town.

In 1979, Pope John Paul II visited Drogheda as part of his five-stop tour of Ireland. He arrived less than a month after the IRA assassination of Lord Mountbatten, Queen Elizabeth's cousin, in Mullaghmore. On 29 September 1979, he arrived in Dublin, where he gave his first mass. He then addressed 300,000 people in Drogheda, where he appealed "on his knees" to paramilitaries to end the violence in Ireland:

"Now I wish to speak to all men and women engaged in violence. I appeal to you, in language of passionate pleading. On my knees I beg you to turn away from the paths of violence and to return to the ways of peace. You may claim to seek justice. I too believe in justice and seek justice. But violence only delays the day of justice. Violence destroys the work of justice. Further violence in Ireland will only drag down to ruin the land you claim to love and the values you claim to cherish."

=== 21st century ===
Two decades into the 21st century some of the historic core of Drogheda town has suffered urban decline. Some of the buildings have been derelict for some years and are in danger of collapse. There was a 2006 traffic plan for pedestrianisation of West Street. It was rejected at a vote of the elected councillors. They had come under pressure from traders in the area concerned about a potential further decline in customer footfall. But the issue has come up for debate again in 2020. When asked, Drogheda residents point out that a combination of expensive car-parking and high commercial rates had a push-pull effect on the town's centre. Shops were forced to close and at the same time shoppers brought their business to retail parks such as the Boyne Shopping Centre on Bolton Street. A substantial root-and-branch approach to renewal of the locality was proposed in "Westgate Vision: A Townscape Recovery Guide", published in 2018, in which the area surrounding Narrow West Street was to be subject to a 10-year regeneration by Louth County Council.

== Demographics ==
Drogheda has a hinterland of 70,000+ within a 15 km (9.3 mi) radius. According to the 2022 census, there were 44,135 people living in Drogheda town at that time.

As of the 2011 census, non-Irish nationals accounted for 16.1% of the population, compared with a national average of 12%. Polish nationals (1,127) were the largest group, followed by Lithuanian nationals (1,044 people). As of the 2016 census, 17.4% of the population were non-Irish nationals, with 676 people from the UK, 1,324 Polish nationals, 1,014 Lithuanians, 1,798 people from elsewhere in the EU, and 1,400 with other (non-EU) nationalities.

As of the 2022 census, the ethnic makeup of the town was 80.65% white total, including 67.81% white Irish and 12.57% other white people, 7.48% not stated, 5.7% Asian, 2.44% other and 3.73% black.

== Arts and entertainment ==
=== Music ===
The town was selected to host Fleadh Cheoil na hÉireann for two years in 2018 and 2019.

Drogheda is home to two brass bands: Drogheda Brass Band and Lourdes Brass Band. In 2014, the town hosted the international summer Samba festival in which samba bands from around the world came to the town for three days of drumming and parades.

The composer and member of Aosdána, Michael Holohan, has lived in Drogheda since 1983. His compositions have been performed and broadcast both at home and internationally. Career highlights in Drogheda include Cromwell (1994), The Mass of Fire (1995) and No Sanctuary (1997)—with Nobel Laureate and poet Seamus Heaney—and Remembrance Sunday and The Drogheda Unification ‘600’ (2012). Holohan has also performed concerts with The Boyne Valley Chamber Orchestra at Fleadh Cheoil na hÉireann in 2018 and 2019.

Drogheda regularly hosts "Music at the Gate", a community-run event led by uilleann piper Darragh Ó Heiligh, next to Saint Laurence's Gate in the centre of Drogheda.

Drogheda Arts Festival, a mix of music, live performance and street entertainment, is held over the May Bank Holiday weekend.

=== Visual arts ===
Highlanes Gallery, the town's first dedicated municipal art gallery, opened in October 2006. It is located in the former Franciscan Church and Friary on St. Laurence Street. The gallery houses Drogheda's municipal art collection, which dates from the mid-18th century.

== Places of interest ==
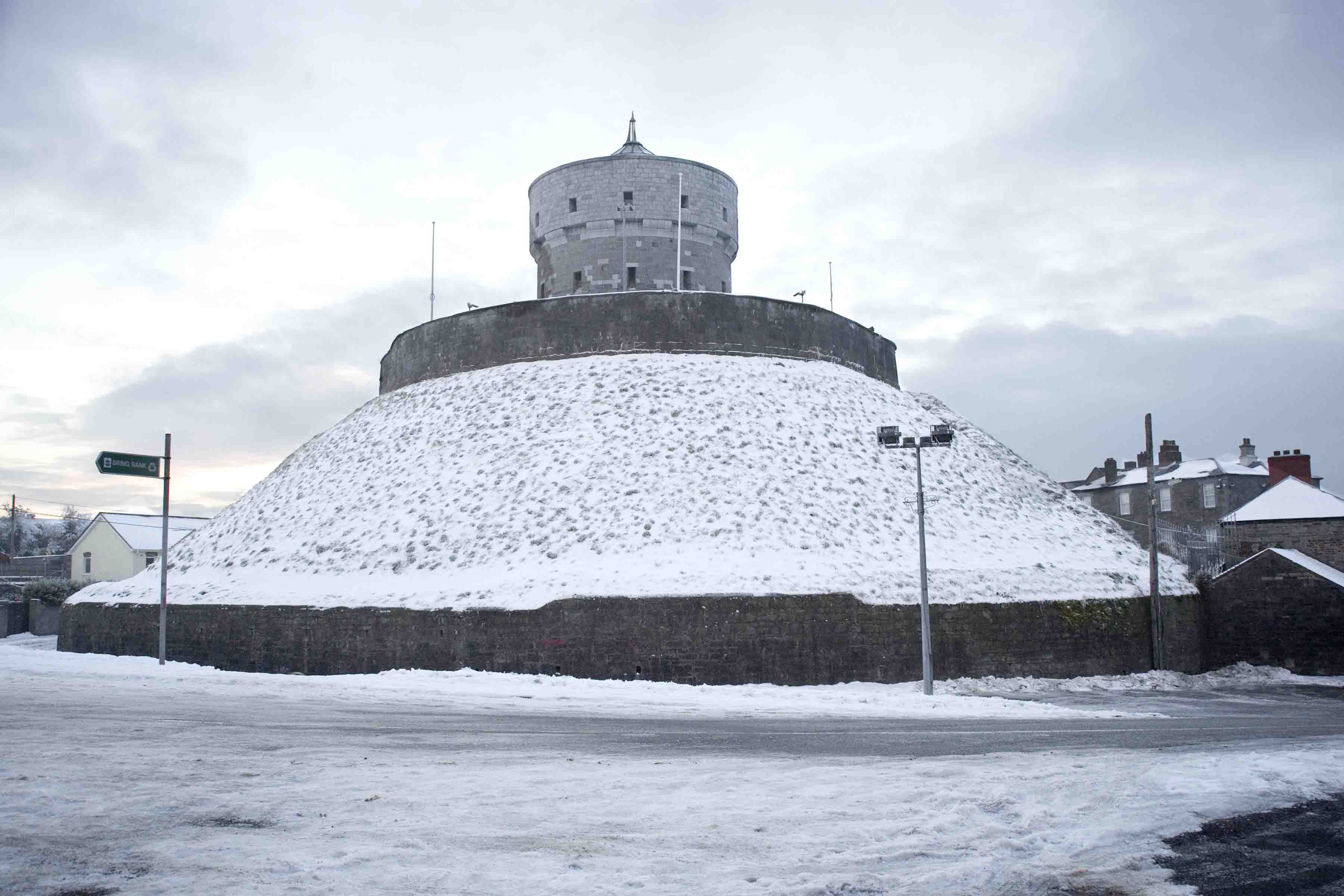
Millmount Monument

Drogheda is an ancient town that has a growing tourism industry. It has a UNESCO World Heritage site, Newgrange, located 8 km (5.0 mi) to the west of the town centre. Other tourist sites in the area include:

- Millmount Fort and museum
- Saint Laurence Gate barbican gate c. 1300s
- John Philip Holland memorial (sculpture commemorating submarine inventor)
- Boyne Viaduct
- John Jameson's residential home (not open to the public), and a Jameson distillery trail of malthouses in the town.
- Battle Of The Boyne Site, visitors centre
- Éamonn Ceannt's school (formerly St Joseph's CBS now operates as Scholars Hotel)
- Beaulieu House and Gardens
- Mellifont Abbey
- Townley Hall nature trail and woods
- Princess Grace Rose Garden at St. Dominic's Park
- St. Peter's Roman Catholic Church, which houses a shrine of Oliver Plunkett
- St Peter's Church of Ireland church, on Peter's Hill
- Highlanes Gallery
- Augustinian Church 'The Passion Window' Harry Clarke Studio

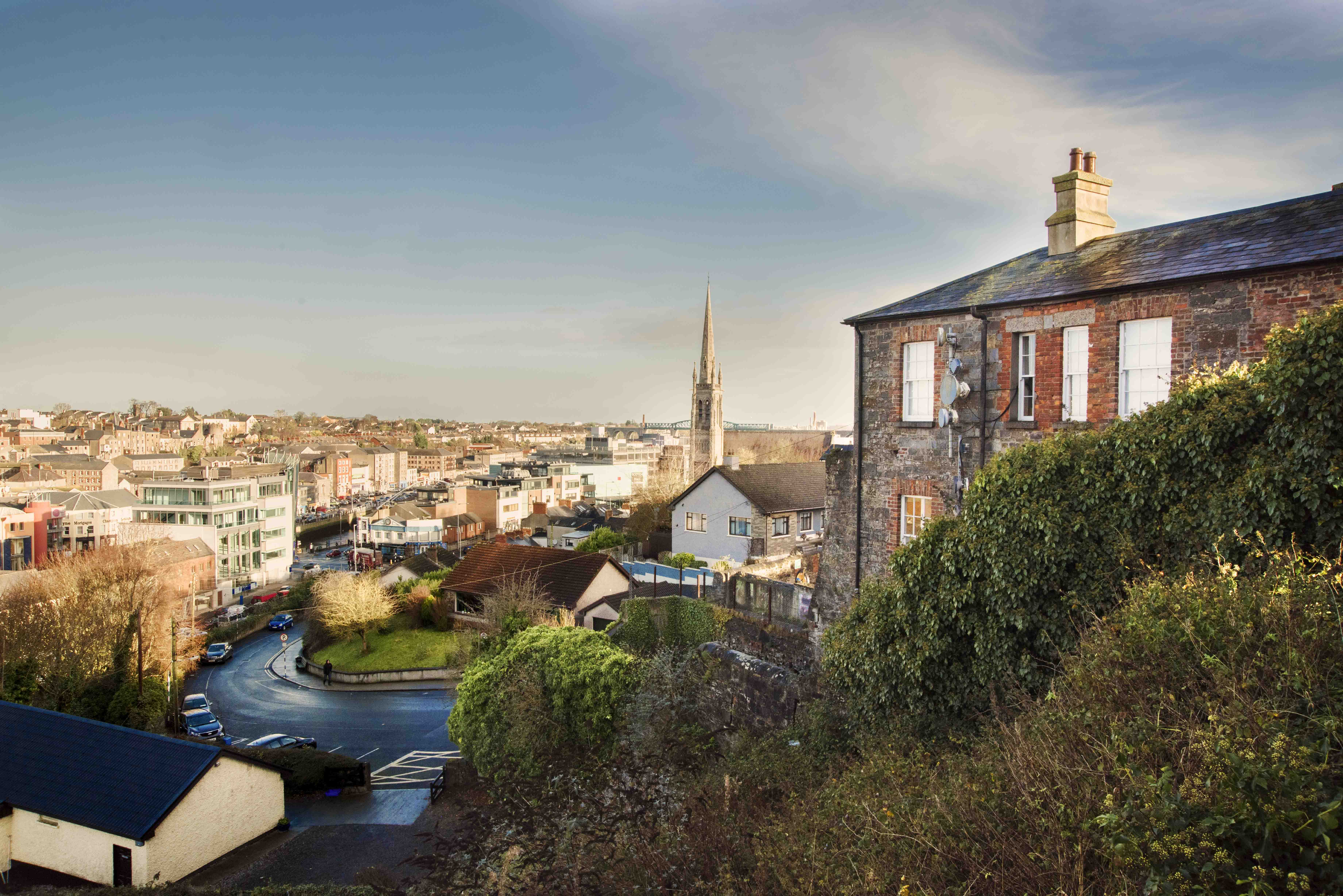
View of Drogheda from Millmount

== Industry and economy ==
There are several national and international companies based in the Drogheda area. Coca-Cola established operations in the town in 1975 and has a facility at SouthGate Shopping Centre. Nature's Best, founded in the 1980s, is one of Ireland's largest producers and distributors of salad products and employs 400 people as of 2024. Other local employers include State Street, Yapstone Inc, the Drogheda Port Company, and Glanbia. BD (Becton, Dickinson and Company) opened a factory in the town in 1964, however, in July 2024 it was announced that the Drogheda medical technology plant would close. Flogas, an Irish energy company, also had its headquarters in the town, however, it closed its Drogheda office in March 2025 and relocated to Dublin Airport.

Drogheda also has a history of and distilling and brewing. The town was once home to 18 distilleries in 1774, however, this would decline to just one by 1822. Preston Brothers Distillery, founded in 1886, produced whiskey that was sold in Ireland and exported to the United States until its closure in 1968. A revival of whiskey distilling began in the 2010s. Boann Distillery, founded in 2016, produces single pot still whiskey since 2019 and exports to 60 countries worldwide. Cairnes Brewery, founded in 1825, was a brewery at the Marsh Road in Drogheda that produced ale and stout. The company closed in the 1960s following its acquisition by Guinness. Other local businesses in the brewing industry include Jack Cody's Brewery, founded in 2014. Dan Kelly's Cider, established in 2013, is also based in Drogheda.

Drogheda has seen growth in the construction of commercial property in the 2020s, with over 1000 newly constructed homes in both 2024 and 2025.

== Transport, communications and amenities ==
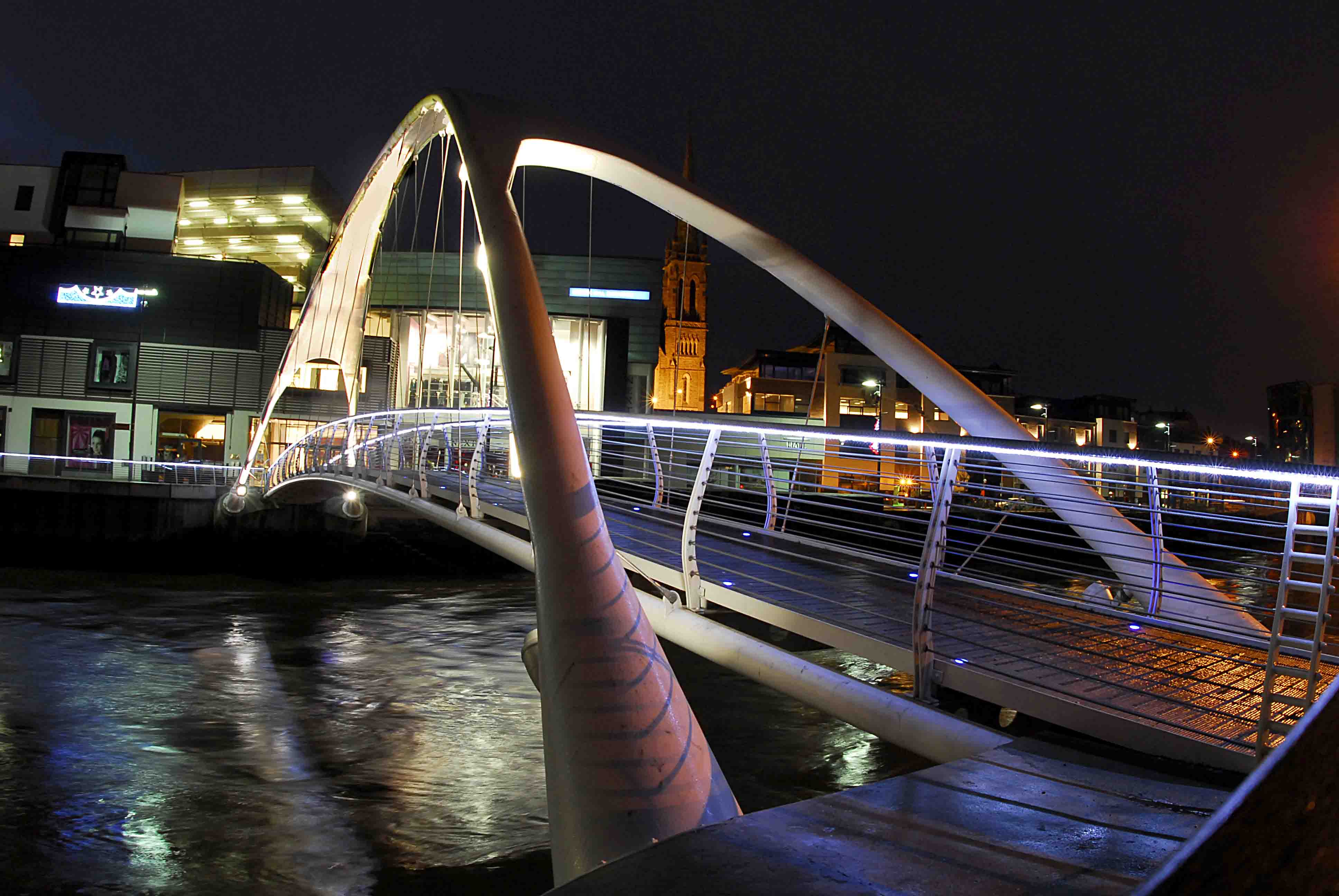
De Lacey Bridge

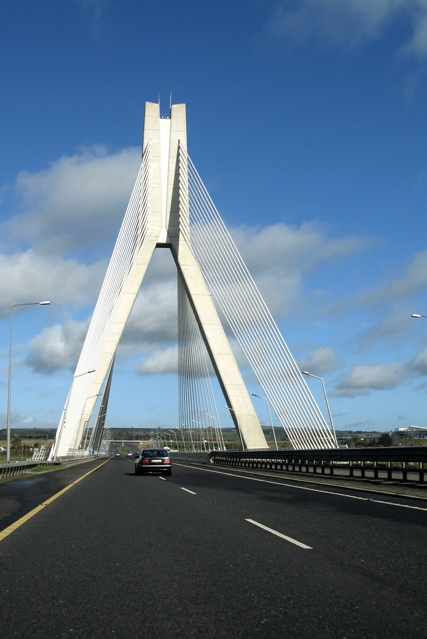
M1 traffic crossing Mary McAleese Boyne Valley Bridge

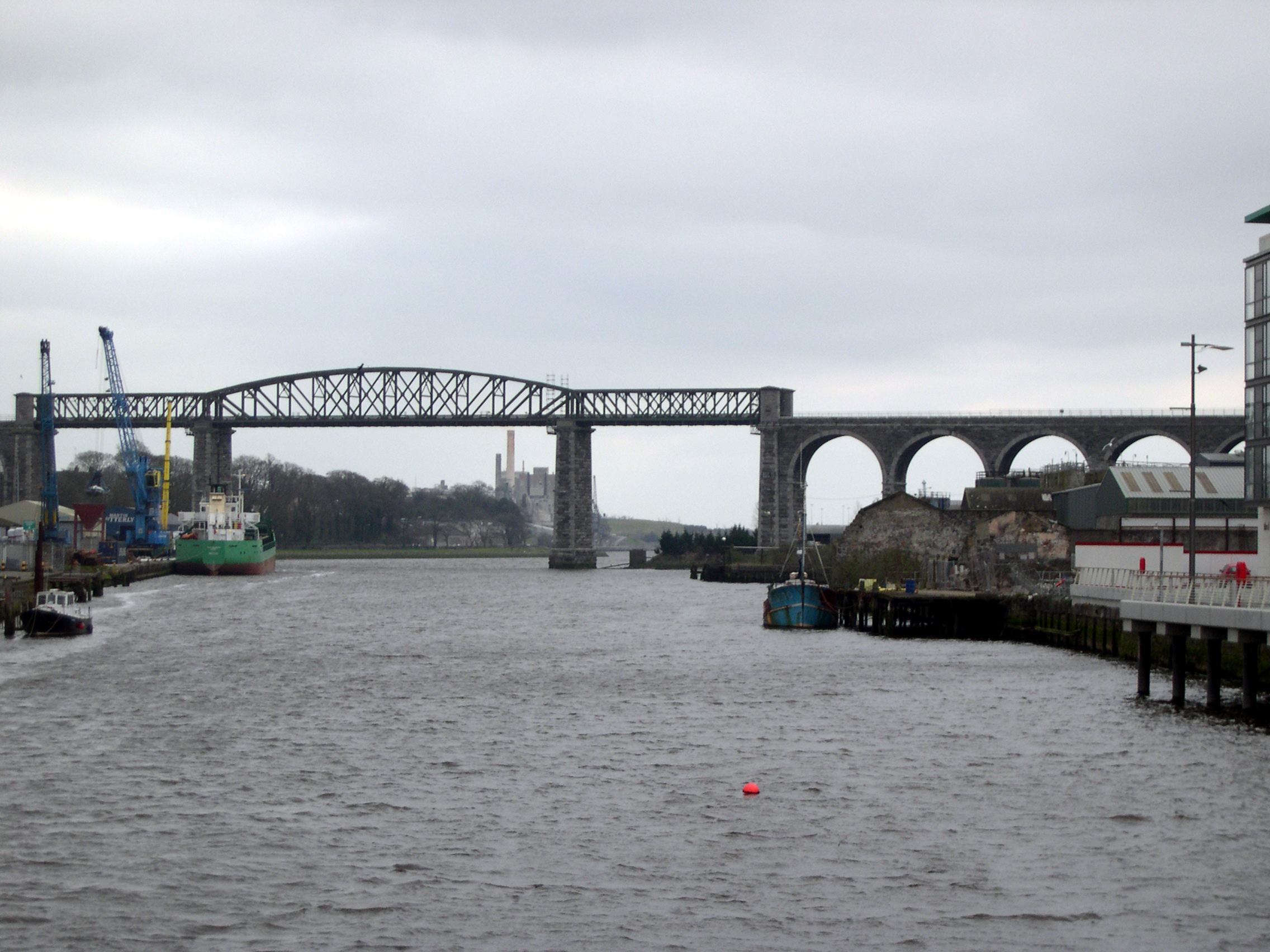
Railway viaduct over River Boyne

=== Road links and infrastructure ===
Drogheda is located close to the M1 (E1 Euro Route 1) (main Dublin – Belfast motorway). The Mary McAleese Boyne Valley Bridge carries traffic from the M1, across the River Boyne, three km (1.9 mi) west of the town and was opened on 9 June 2003. The town's postcode, or eircode, is A92.

=== Railway ===
Drogheda acquired rail links to Dublin in 1844, Navan in 1850 and Belfast in 1852. Passenger services between Drogheda and Navan were ended in 1958, however the line remains open for freight (Tara Mines/Platin Cement) traffic. In 1966 Drogheda station was renamed "MacBride". Drogheda railway station opened on 26 May 1844.

The station has direct trains on the Enterprise northbound to Dundalk, Newry, Portadown and Belfast Grand Central, and southbound to Dublin Connolly. 1 Train a day to Belfast skips Drogheda.

A wide variety of Iarnród Éireann commuter services connect southbound to Balbriggan, Malahide, Howth Junction, Dublin Connolly, Tara Street, Dublin Pearse, Dún Laoghaire, Bray, Greystones, Wicklow, and Wexford. The DART is planned to be extended to Drogheda in the late 2020s or 30s as part of the DART+ program.

=== Bus transport ===
Drogheda's bus station is located on Donore Road. Bus Éireann operates several town bus services. It also runs routes from Drogheda to Dublin, Dundalk, Athlone and Monaghan.

=== Air transport ===
Dublin Airport is located 42 km (26 mi) south of Drogheda and can be reached via the M1 motorway by car.

== Administration ==
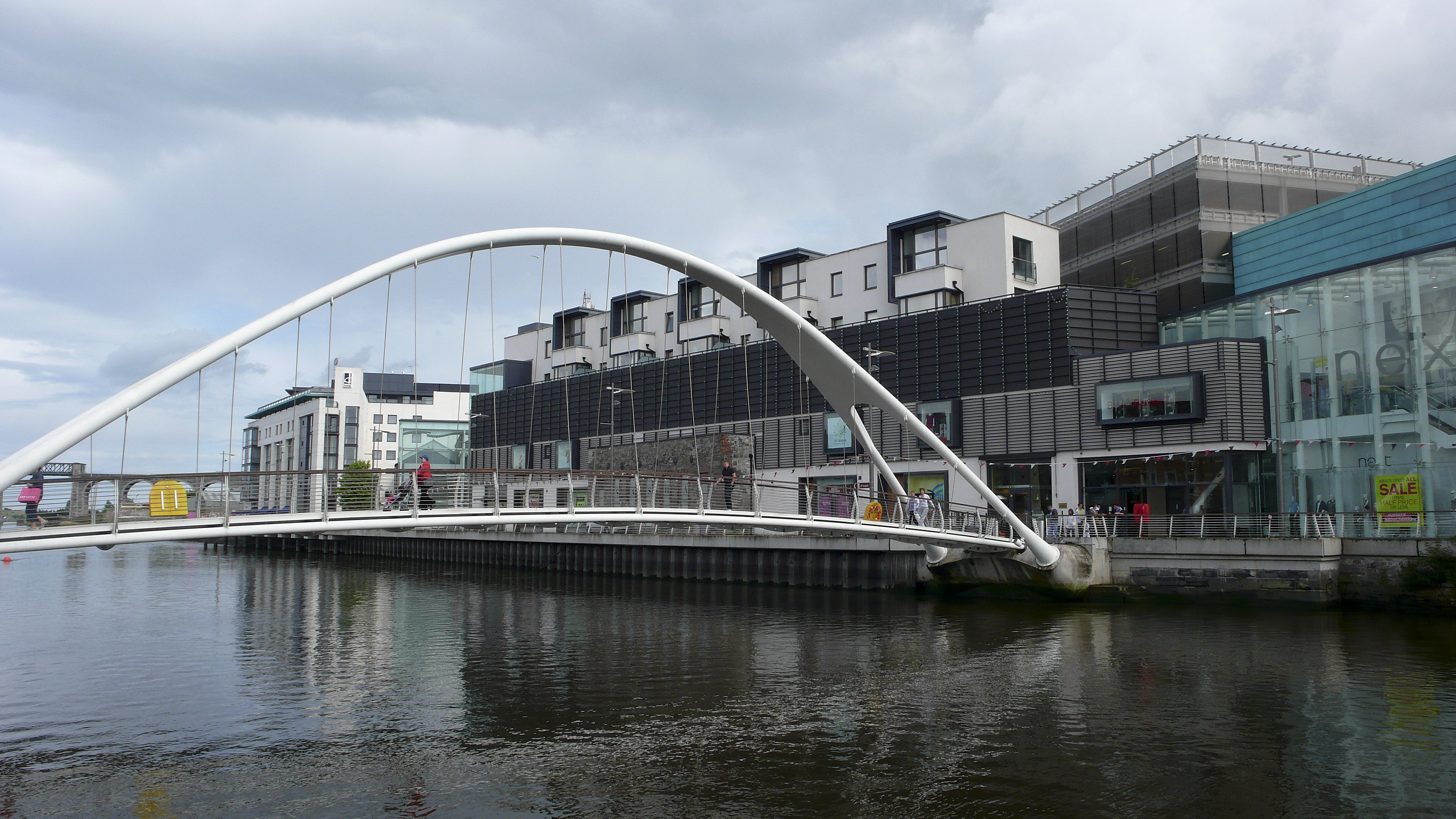
Scotch Hall Shopping Centre

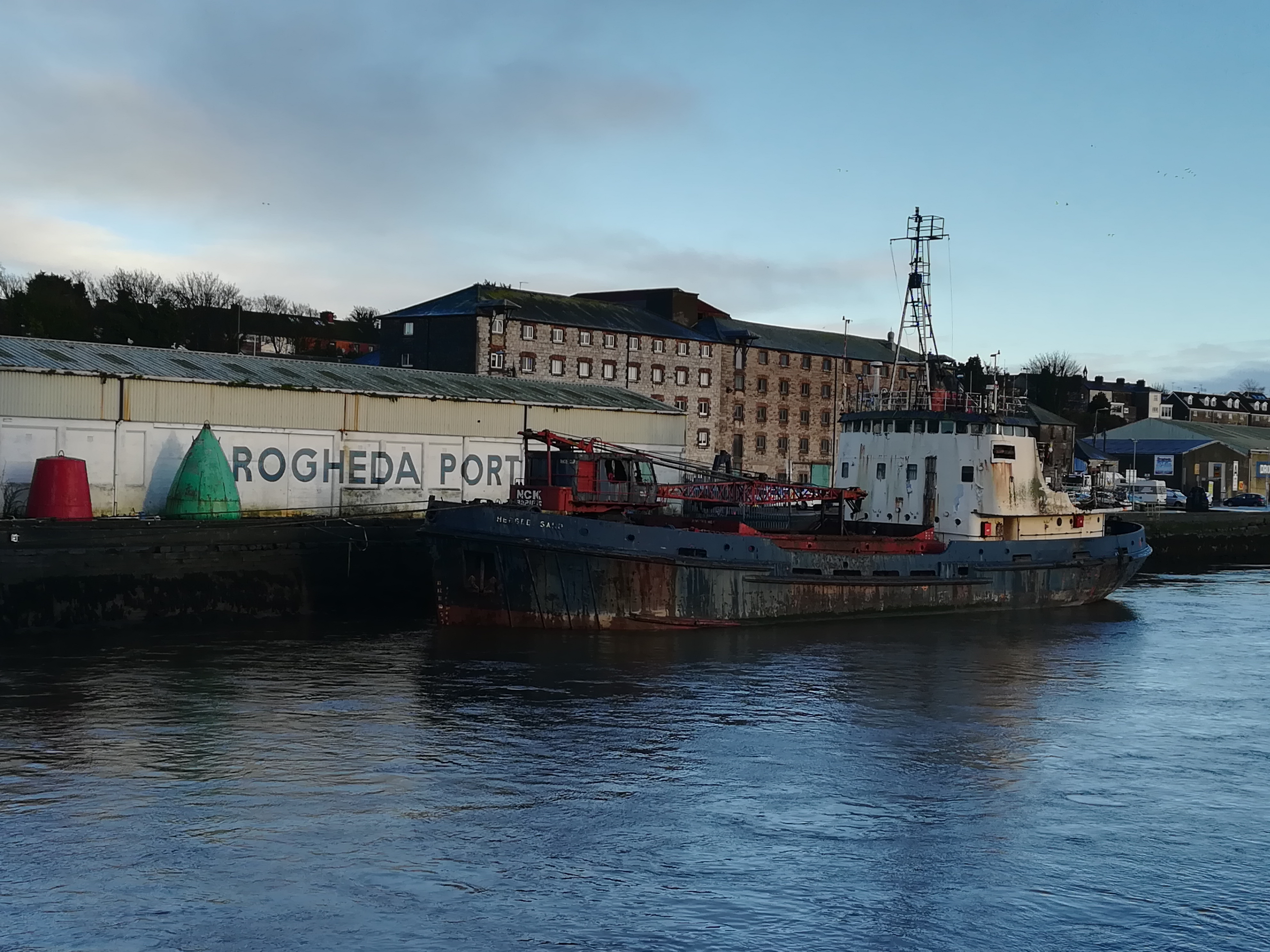
Hebble Sand moored on the Boyne.

Drogheda was one of ten boroughs retained under the Municipal Corporations (Ireland) Act 1840. Under the Local Government (Ireland) Act 1898, the area became an urban district, while retaining the style of a borough corporation.

Drogheda Borough Corporation became a borough council in 2002. On 1 June 2014, the borough council was dissolved and the administration of the town was amalgamated with Louth County Council. It retains the right to be described as a borough. The chair of the borough district uses the title of mayor, rather than Cathaoirleach.

As of the 2019 Louth County Council election, the borough district of Drogheda contains the local electoral areas of Drogheda Urban (6 seats) and Drogheda Rural (4 seats), electing 10 seats to the council.

The parliamentary borough of Drogheda returned two MPs to the Irish House of Commons until 1801. Under the Act of Union, the parliamentary borough returned one MP to the United Kingdom House of Commons, until its abolition under the Redistribution of Seats Act 1885. It was thereafter represented by the South Louth from 1885 to 1918, by County Louth from 1918 to 1922, by Louth–Meath from 1921 to 1923, and by the Dáil constituency of Louth from 1923 to the present.

== Media ==
The local newspapers are the Drogheda Independent (known locally as the D.I.) which was established in 1884, and the Drogheda Leader which was established in 1995. The office of the Drogheda Independent is at 9 Shop Street and the offices of the Drogheda Leader are at 13 West Street.

The local radio station is LMFM, broadcasting on 95.8 FM. The headquarters of LMFM is on Marley's Lane on the south side of the town.

== Hospitals and health care ==
Drogheda is a regional centre for medical care. Its main hospital is Our Lady of Lourdes Hospital, a public hospital located in the town. and is part of the Louth Meath Hospital Group. Facilities include a 24-hour emergency department for the populations of County Louth, County Meath and the North-East of Ireland. As of 2024, the hospital provides 340 beds, of which 30 are reserved for acute day cases.

== Education ==
There are seven secondary schools situated in Drogheda. These include St. Joseph's Secondary School (a former boys' school until 2023), St. Mary's Diocesan School (a boys' school), The Sacred Heart School (a girls' school), the Drogheda Grammar School, St. Oliver's Community College, Ballymakenny College (all mixed schools), and Our Lady's College (a girls' school). There is also Drogheda Institute for Further Education (DIFE), a third-level college situated in the Moneymore townland.

== Climate ==
Drogheda has an oceanic climate (Köppen: Cfb).

Climate data for Drogheda
| Month | Jan | Feb | Mar | Apr | May | Jun | Jul | Aug | Sep | Oct | Nov | Dec | Year |
|---|---|---|---|---|---|---|---|---|---|---|---|---|---|
| Mean daily maximum °C (°F) | 8.1 (46.6) | 8.6 (47.5) | 9.9 (49.8) | 12.0 (53.6) | 14.9 (58.8) | 17.5 (63.5) | 18.9 (66.0) | 18.6 (65.5) | 16.9 (62.4) | 13.8 (56.8) | 10.5 (50.9) | 8.6 (47.5) | 13.2 (55.7) |
| Daily mean °C (°F) | 6.1 (43.0) | 6.3 (43.3) | 7.2 (45.0) | 9.0 (48.2) | 11.8 (53.2) | 14.5 (58.1) | 15.9 (60.6) | 15.7 (60.3) | 14.0 (57.2) | 11.4 (52.5) | 8.4 (47.1) | 6.6 (43.9) | 10.6 (51.0) |
| Mean daily minimum °C (°F) | 4.0 (39.2) | 4.0 (39.2) | 4.5 (40.1) | 6.0 (42.8) | 8.6 (47.5) | 11.3 (52.3) | 13.0 (55.4) | 12.9 (55.2) | 11.3 (52.3) | 9.0 (48.2) | 6.2 (43.2) | 4.6 (40.3) | 8.0 (46.3) |
| Average precipitation mm (inches) | 62.3 (2.45) | 54.2 (2.13) | 55.6 (2.19) | 53.6 (2.11) | 65.4 (2.57) | 68.1 (2.68) | 73.3 (2.89) | 77.1 (3.04) | 68.2 (2.69) | 83.8 (3.30) | 80.9 (3.19) | 74.4 (2.93) | 816.9 (32.17) |
Source: Weather.Directory

== Sport ==
The town's association football team, Drogheda United, was formed in 1919, and their home matches are played at Sullivan and Lambe Park. Nicknamed "The Drogs", they compete in the League of Ireland, and won the 2007 Premier Division title. The club achieved success by winning the FAI Cup in 2005 and 2024, and back to back Setanta Sports Cup successes in 2006 and 2007, along with the 2012 EA Sports Cup. The team came close to UEFA Champions League qualification in 2008. They also narrowly missed out on a UEFA Cup place twice, in 2006 and 2007. In 2011, Drogheda became the sister club of Turkish club Trabzonspor due to their matching colours, and the town's history of Ottoman assistance during the Great Famine. They are also the sister club of English club Walsall and Danish club Silkeborg IF through their shared ownership by Trivela Group. The team qualified for the 2025-26 UEFA Conference League by winning the 2024 FAI Cup. However, the rules of the competition prohibited the participation of both Drogheda United and Silkeborg IF, who were also due to compete, due to their ownership by the same company. Consequently, Drogheda United were excluded, as Silkeborg IF finished in a higher position in the 2024–25 Danish Superliga compared to the team's finish in the 2024 League of Ireland Premier Division.

In rugby union, the local Boyne RFC team was formed in 1997 from the amalgamation of Delvin RFC and Drogheda RFC. The team won the Division 1A title of the Leinster League in 2026.

== Town twinning ==
Drogheda is twinned with the following places:

- Bronte, Italy
- Saint-Mandé, France
- Salinas, California, United States

== Notable people ==
=== Arts and media ===
- Yasmine Akram, comedian and actress in Sherlock
- Pierce Brosnan, actor, film producer and environmentalist was born in Drogheda
- Eamonn Campbell, member of The Dubliners
- Alison Comyn, journalist, broadcaster, and politician.
- Susan Connolly, poet
- Daniele Formica, actor, stage director and playwright was born in Drogheda
- Angela Greene, poet
- Michael Holohan, composer, member and former chair of Aosdána
- Jonathan Kelly, singer-songwriter
- Evanna Lynch, actress known for her role as Luna Lovegood in the Harry Potter films, educated at Our Lady's College in Drogheda
- Colin O'Donoghue, actor known for his role of Captain Hook/Killian Jones in the American TV Show Once Upon a Time
- Hector Ó hEochagáin, broadcaster and podcaster, born in Drogheda
- Offica, drill rapper
- Deirdre O'Kane, actress and comedian
- Eliza O'Neill, actress.
- John Boyle O'Reilly, poet and novelist, member of the Irish Republican Brotherhood, born in Dowth Castle near Drogheda
- Nano Reid, painter of landscapes, particularly Drogheda, the Boyne Valley and surrounding areas
- Fiachra Trench, composer. Penned the string arrangement for fairytale of New York, and wrote music for many Hollywood films

=== Politics and diplomacy ===
- Éamonn Ceannt 1916 Rising Leader – secondary school student in St Joseph CBS Drogheda
- Damien English, former Fine Gael politician and TD for Meath West, was born in Drogheda
- William Hughes, Irish-born US senator from New Jersey
- Alison Kelly, former Irish diplomat
- Tony Martin, Canadian social democratic legislator
- Dominic McGlinchey, INLA leader, assassinated 10 February 1994
- Mairead McGuinness, European Finance Commissioner and Fine Gael MEP
- Ged Nash, Irish Labour Party politician and TD for Louth
- Geraldine Byrne Nason diplomat, Irish Ambassador to the United Nations
- John Neary, diplomat, ambassador to Japan
- Paddy O'Hanlon, former Nationalist MP for South Armagh
- Henry Singleton, judge and friend of Jonathan Swift, was a lifelong resident of Drogheda
- Peadar Toibin, TD for Meath West and founder of Aontú
- T. K. Whitaker, former Irish economist who wrote the Programme for Economic Expansion

=== Military ===
- John Barrett Captain of HMS Minotaur (1793) and HMS Africa (1781)
- George Forbes, 3rd Earl of Granard Naval Officer – educated in Drogheda
- William Kenny, recipient of the Victoria Cross
- Thomas Charles Wright, admiral and general, a founder of the Ecuadorian Navy

=== Academia and science ===
- James Cullen, mathematician who discovered what are now known as the Cullen numbers.
- John Philip Holland, inventor of the modern-day submarine.
- Thomas McLaughlin ESB founder and first CEO. Built the Shannon Hydro Electric Plant.
- Michael Scott, architect who designed Busáras and the Abbey Theatre

=== Religion ===
- James Chadwick, theologian, lyricist and Archbishop of Newcastle and Hexham
- Patrick Curtis Archbishop of Armagh; spymaster for the Duke of Wellington in the Peninsular War.
- Thomas Lancaster, bishop, buried at St. Peter's Church

=== Sport ===
- Keane Barry, professional PDC darts player
- Tommy Breen, Manchester United goalkeeper
- Gavin Brennan, former midfielder for Drogheda United and Shamrock Rovers; brother of footballer Killian Brennan.
- Killian Brennan, former midfielder for Bohs, Derry City and St. Pat's in the League of Ireland Premier Division
- Lukas Browning Lagerfeldt, footballer
- Tommy Byrne, former racing driver, raced briefly in Formula 1 in 1982
- Tony Byrne, bronze medal winner for Ireland 1956 Summer Olympics in Melbourne in the lightweight division.
- Megan Campbell, former Liverpool association footballer
- Jerome Clarke, former Drogheda United forward, earned one cap for the Republic of Ireland.
- Nick Colgan, goalkeeper for Chelsea, Hibernian and the Republic of Ireland.
- Barry Conlon, former Manchester City Striker
- Daryl DeLeon, Filipino-British racing driver
- Mick Fairclough, Former Irish International (English Premier League of that era)
- Evan Ferguson, professional footballer for A.S. Roma in the Seria A
- Bernard Flynn, member of the Meath football team during the 1980s and 1990s
- Paddy Gavin, former full-back for Dundalk, Doncaster Rovers and Republic of Ireland B
- Deirdre Gogarty, 1997 Women's International Boxing Federation (WIBF) featherweight world champion.
- James Hand, footballer for Huddersfield Town
- Ian Harte, former footballer with several English clubs and the Republic of Ireland national football team
- Gary Kelly, football player and charity campaigner.
- Colin Lowth, an Olympic swimmer who represented Ireland at the 2000 Summer Olympics in Sydney.
- David McAllister, midfielder for Sheffield United, Shrewsbury Town and Stevenage.
- Shane Monahan, Professional rugby player, Gloucester, Leinster, Munster, Connaught, Ireland U-21s International.
- Des Smyth, professional golfer, vice-captain on the winning Ryder Cup team in 2006
- Steve Staunton, former Liverpool and Aston Villa defender and Republic of Ireland captain and manager was born there
- Gary Tallon, midfielder for Mansfield Town
- Kevin Thornton, former footballer with several English clubs and the Republic of Ireland under 21s
- Sean Thornton, former footballer with several English clubs, including Sunderland, and the Republic of Ireland under 21 national team

=== Other ===
- George Drumgoole Coleman, architect who played an instrumental role in the design and construction of much of the civil infrastructure in early Singapore
- Sir John Lumsden, founder of St John Ambulance Ireland
- Jill Meagher, crime victim
- Amanda Teague, Jack Sparrow impersonator and posthumous marrier

== Freedom of the Town ==
The following people have received the Freedom of the Town of Drogheda since the corporation was reformed under the Municipal Corporations (Ireland) Act 1840.

People granted the Freedom of Drogheda
| Date | Name | Notes |
|---|---|---|
| 1 February 1877 | Isaac Butt | IPP (Irish Parliamentary Party) leader |
| 1 February 1877 | Benjamin Whitworth | IPP MP and Drogheda resident |
| 1 February 1881 | Charles Stewart Parnell | IPP leader |
| 2 October 1882 | Garnet Wolseley | Victorious commander at the Battle of Tel El Kebir |
| 7 May 1888 | John Dillon | IPP MP |
| 12 December 1889 | George Shaw Lefevre | Liberal MP, supporter of Home Rule and land reform |
| 27 July 1904 | Vincenzo Vannutelli | Papal legate at the reconsecration of St Patrick's Cathedral, Armagh |
| 19 February 1902 | John Redmond | IPP leader |
| 14 September 1909 | Edward O'Meagher Condon | Fenian involved in Manchester Martyrs operation who escaped to USA; toured Ireland in 1909 |
| 14 September 1909 | John O'Callaghan | National Secretary of the United Irish League and a staff writer on The Boston Globe |
| 30 June 1914 | John J. Glennon | Catholic Archbishop of St. Louis |
| 17 March 1915 | William Kenny | Victoria Cross recipient, and a native of Drogheda |
| 17 August 1920 | Daniel Mannix | Catholic Archbishop of Melbourne |
| 28 June 1932 | Lorenzo Lauri | Papal legate to the 1932 Eucharistic Congress |
| 27 November 1935 | Éamon de Valera | President of the Executive Council of the Irish Free State |
| 1 August 1939 | Seán T. O'Kelly | Minister for Local Government and Public Health |
| 15 February 1953 | John D'Alton | Catholic Archbishop of Armagh |
| 16 December 1956 | John F. Stokes | Catholic parish priest of St Peter's, Drogheda |
| 26 April 1959 | Richard Cushing | Archbishop of Boston, United States |
| 31 July 1962 | Michael Browne | Catholic Archbishop of Armagh |
| 25 August 1964 | Henry Farrell | Catholic parish priest of St. John the Baptist's, Perth, Ontario, Canada, and a native of Drogheda. |
| 13 May 1965 | William Conway | Catholic Archbishop of Armagh |
| 6 June 1966 | Mary Martin | Founder of the Medical Missionaries of Mary |
| 29 September 1979 | Pope John Paul II | During his visit to Ireland |
| 19 March 1980 | Tomás Ó Fiaich | Catholic Archbishop of Armagh |
| 28 July 1980 | James Lennon | Catholic parish priest of St Peter's, Drogheda |
| 28 June 1990 | Patrick Hillery | President of Ireland |
| 5 July 1992 | Cahal Daly | Catholic Archbishop of Armagh |
| 3 April 1993 | Mary Robinson | President of Ireland |
| 14 April 1997 | Edmund Garvey | Head of the Congregation of Christian Brothers in Ireland, and a native of Drogheda. Disacknowledged in 2023 |
| 12 December 1999 | T. K. Whitaker | Retired public servant |
| 11 May 2001 | John Hume | Nobel Peace Prize winner |
| 27 June 2002 | Gary Kelly | Played for the Republic of Ireland national football team at the 2002 FIFA World Cup, and a native of Drogheda |
| 12 May 2010 | Oliver Murphy | Founding member of the Irish Wheelchair Association, and a native of Drogheda |
| 9 May 2013 | Patrick Joseph Morrissey | Garda killed on duty in 1985 near Tallanstown in County Louth |
| 24 October 2013 | Ignatius O'Donovan | Prior of the Order of Saint Augustine in Drogheda |
| 22 May 2015 | Michael D. Higgins | President of Ireland |
| 8 June 2018 | Seamus Mallon | Former Deputy First Minister of Northern Ireland |
| 10 January 2020 | Geraldine Byrne Nason | Ireland's permanent representative to the United Nations, and a native of Drogheda |

Years after Edmund Garvey was awarded the freedom, it emerged that he had allowed a legal strategy which made it more difficult for survivors of Christian Brothers child sexual abuse to sue the order for compensation. A campaign to rescind his freedom was led by Michael Reade's radio show on LMFM. On 4 September 2023, Drogheda Borough Council voted by 5 votes to 4 with one abstention "to no longer acknowledge Edmund Garvey as Freeman of Drogheda", despite legal advice from Joan Martin, chief executive of Louth County Council, that the act was ultra vires. Garvey initiated a judicial review but chose not to proceed. As of 23 April 2026, Garvey's name remains on the list of the Freedom of Drogheda on the Louth County Council website, with a footnote on the 2023 council vote.

== See also ==
- List of abbeys and priories in Ireland (County Louth)
- List of towns and villages in Ireland
