= Susan Connolly (poet) =

Irish poet

- Born: Susan Connolly; 1956 (age 69–70); Drogheda, County Louth
- Occupation: Writer

Susan Connolly (born 1956) is an Irish poet.

== Life ==
Susan Connolly was born in 1956 in Drogheda, County Louth where she still lives. She is published by Flax Mill, Dedalus Press and Shearsman. She won the Patrick and Katherine Kavanagh Fellowship in Poetry in 2001.

Connolly worked with Anne-Marie Moroney on various collections including a literary and placenames map of the River Boyne. She has had her poems set to music by the Irish composers Michael Holohan and James Wilson. She was also the focus of a broadcast on ABC National Radio (Australia). In 2015 Connolly was awarded a residency in the Heinrich Böll Cottage on Achill Island. Her book of visual poetry Bridge of the Ford was published by Shearsman Books in 2016. The Orchard Keeper, her sequence of poems about the celebrated Slane poet Francis Ledwidge was published by Shearsman Books during The Ledwidge Centenary in 2017.

== Selected bibliography ==
- For the Stranger (Dublin, Dedalus Press, 1993)
- Stone and Tree Sheltering Water: An Exploration of Sacred and Secular Wells in County Louth (Drogheda, Flax Mill, 1998)
- How High the Moon: Boann & other poems (Poetry Ireland/Co-operation North 1991)
- Race to the Sea (Flax Mill, 1999)
- Ogham: Ancestors Remembered in Stone (Flax Mill, 2000)
- A Salmon in the Pool (Carraig Mhachaire Rois, County Meath, Tearmann, 2001)
- Forest Music (Exeter, UK, Shearsman, 2009)
- The Sun Artist (Bristol, UK, Shearsman 2013)
- Bridge of the Ford (Bristol, UK, Shearsman, 2016)
- The Orchard Keeper (Bristol, UK, Shearsman 2017)
