= James Lennon =

James Lennon may refer to:

- James Lennon (Irish politician), Irish Sinn Féin politician
- James Lennon (Wisconsin politician), member of the Wisconsin State Assembly
- James Lennon (bishop), Irish Catholic bishop
- James Wilfrid Lennon, Irish diplomat
- Jimmy Lennon, ring announcer for boxing and wrestling matches
- Jimmy Lennon Jr., American boxing ring announcer
