= St Oliver's Community College, Drogheda =

St Oliver's Community College

Location
- Rathmullan Rd; Drogheda, County Louth, A92 D766; Ireland
- Coordinates: 53.7137°N 6.3785°W

Information
- Type: Secondary, vocational
- Established: 1980
- Founder: Bishop James Lennon
- Gender: Coeducational
- Age range: 12—18
- Enrolment: 1462 (2023)
- Website: www.socc.ie

St Oliver's Community College is a coeducational secondary school in Drogheda, Ireland. Founded as a vocational school, it has since expanded to offer other mainstream subjects but still maintains a focus on industrial arts.

== History ==
St Oliver's CC was founded as a vocational school by Bishop James Lennon, chair of the Drogheda VEC, to meet a local demand for skilled workers in various trades.

== Notable people ==
Former pupils

- Ian Harte, footballer
- Jill Meagher, murder victim
- Keane Mulready-Woods, murder victim

Former teachers

- Ged Nash, politician
