= Saint Laurence Gate =

- Geata Labhráis
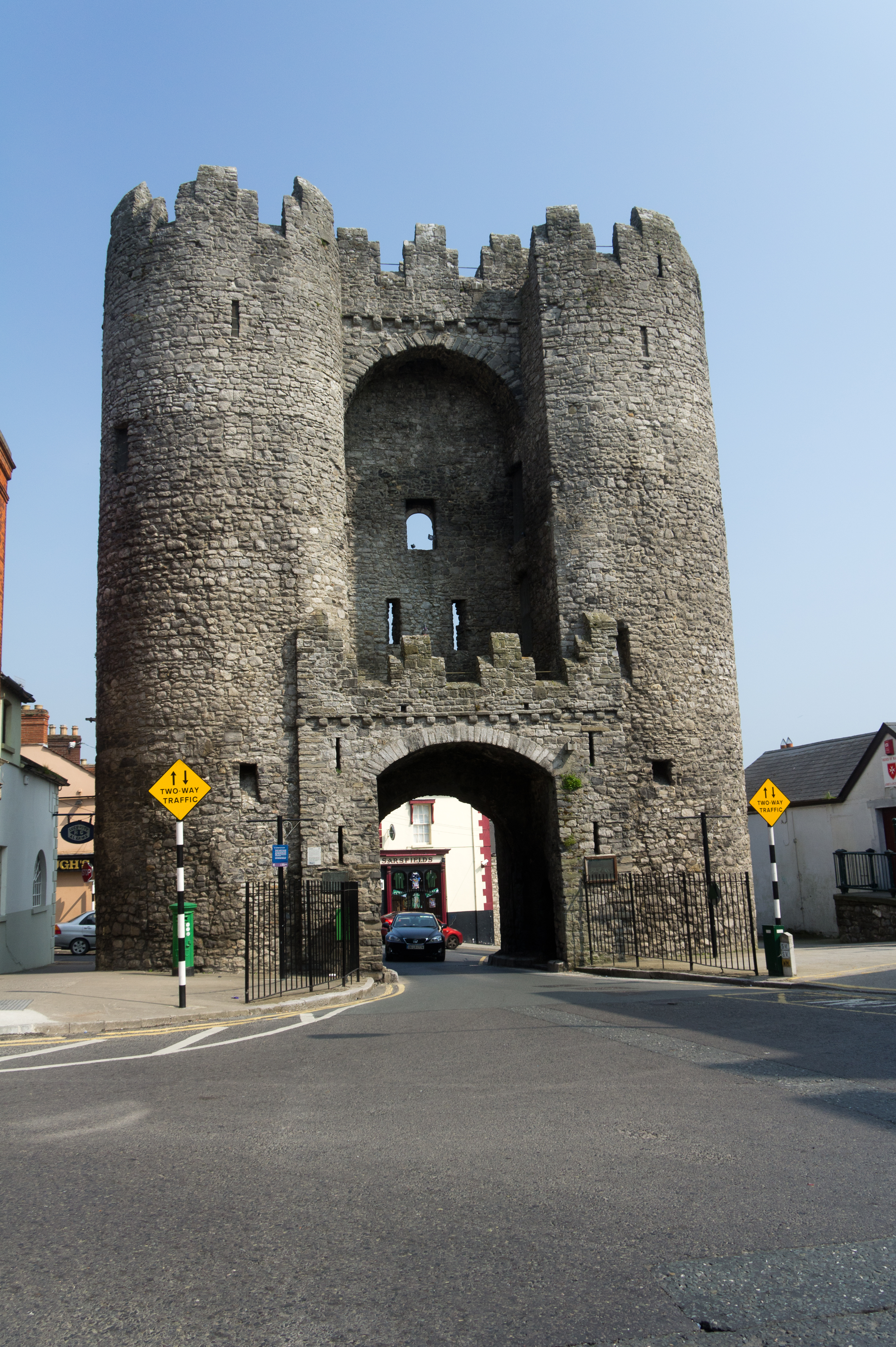
- Interactive map of the Saint Laurence Gate area
- Former names: Great East Gate

General information
- Type: Barbican
- Location: St. Laurence Street, Drogheda, Ireland
- Coordinates: 53.7159°N 6.3470°W
- Completed: c1280
- Owner: Office of Public Works

Website
- St.Laurence Gate

The Saint Laurence Gate is a barbican which was built in the 13th century as part of the walled fortifications of the medieval town of Drogheda in Ireland. It is a barbican or defended fore-work which stood directly outside the original gate of which no surface trace survives. It has been described as one of the finest of its kind, and is designated as a national monument. The original names for Laurence Street and Saint Laurence Gate were Great East Street and Great East Gate, respectively. In the 14th century, the street and gate were renamed because they led to the hospital of Saint Laurence, which stood close to the Cord church.

== Structure ==
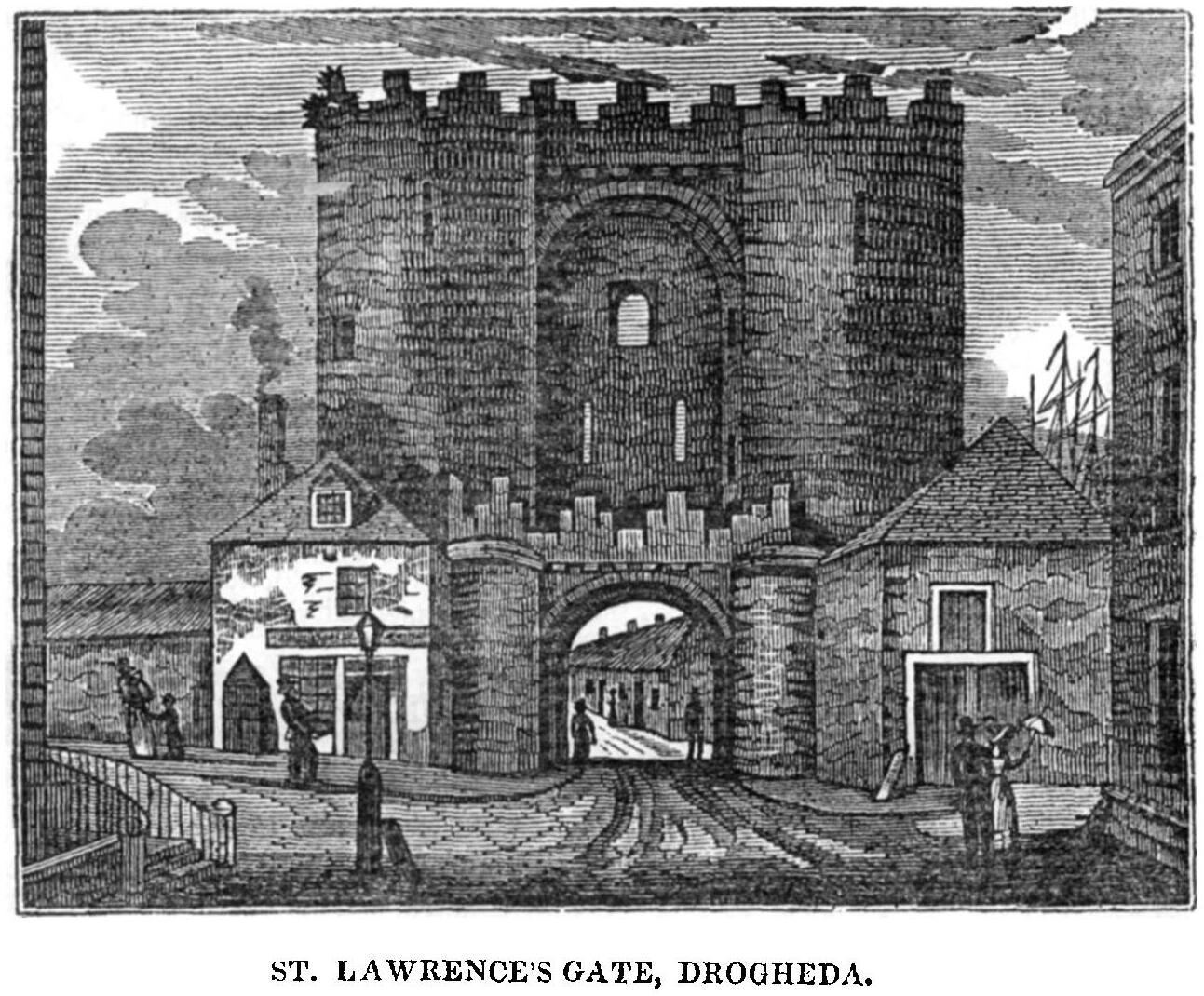
The Gate in 1834, Dublin Penny Journal

The structure consists of two towers, each with four floors, joined by a bridge at the top, and an entrance arch at street level. Entry is gained up a flight of stairs in the south tower. There is a slot underneath the arch from where a portcullis originally could be raised and lowered.

Historians have wondered why such a large barbican was built in the east of the town, when the main artery through the town has always been north/south. For comparison, a similar barbican in Canterbury is less than half the height of Saint Laurence Gate. However, from the top of the Gate, the estuary of the Boyne and a four-mile stretch of river from there to Drogheda can be observed. This is therefore the only point in the town with a clear view of a potential sea invasion. The structure was built in the late 13th-century and heightened by two storeys in the 15th century with the addition of the top connecting arch and battlements. The earliest pictures of Laurence's Gate show that there was a raised lookout platform at the top of the south tower to provide an even higher vantage point.

The medieval town wall joined Laurence's Gate on either side of the portcullis arch. A portion of the town wall remains to the south of Laurence's Gate. North of Laurence's Gate, the wall ran up Palace St/King St where the footpath is today. The deep basements of the buildings on Palace St and King Street suggest the presence of a deep trench outside the wall. Over the centuries, as the walls and gates fell into disrepair, the rubble stones were reused in the construction of later buildings in the vicinity of Laurence's Gate. For example, the stone buildings on the west side of Francis Street. Older pictures show that a toll booth and gate house remained until the early 19th century. The shop beside Laurence's Gate was a bicycle shop in the early 1900s. The green letter box dates from a time when there was a post office there.

== Events ==
Music at the Gate is held during the warmer months of the year. A variety of performances are hosted by the nonprofit Music at the Gate organisers.

== Gallery ==
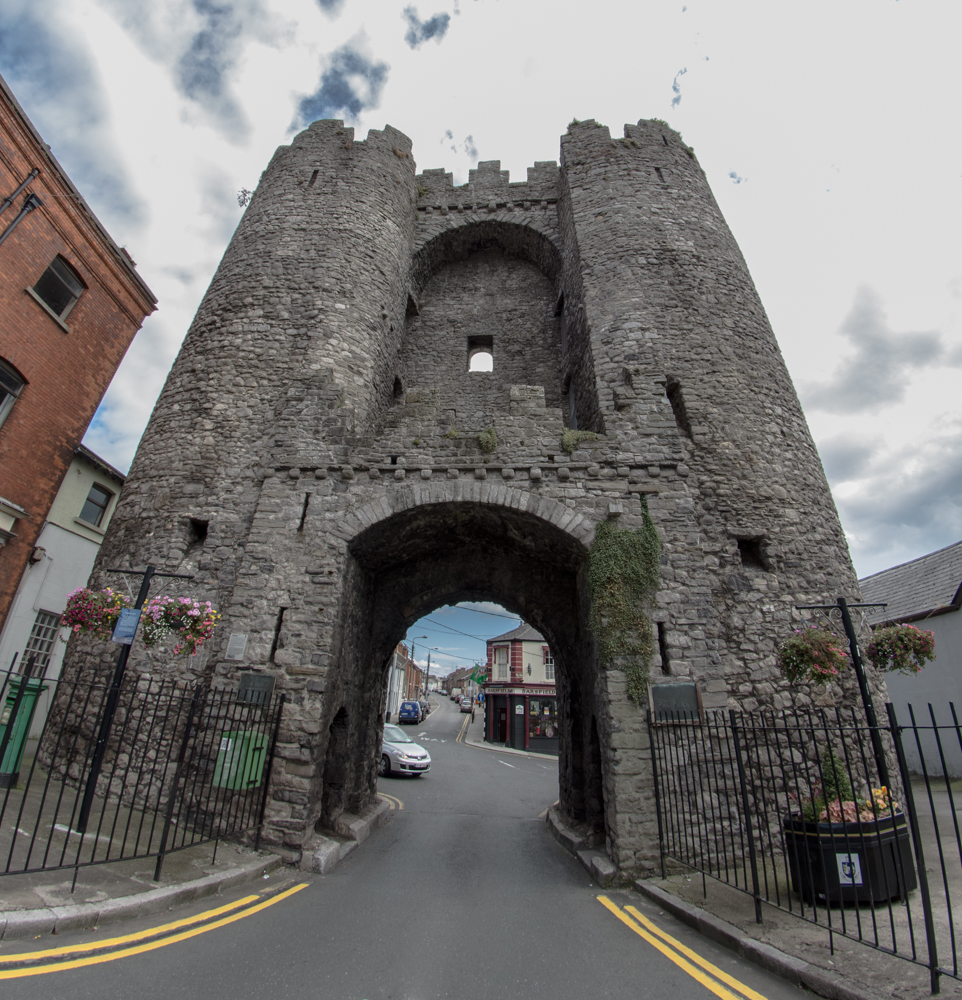
Close up of the gate.

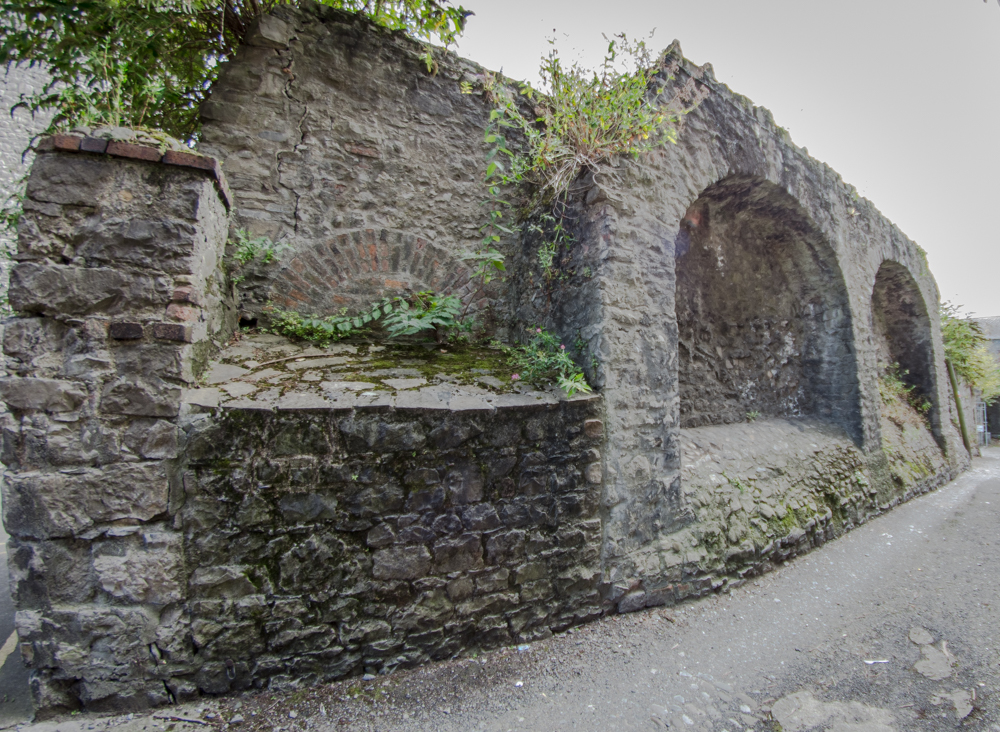
Drogheda's town wall running beside St. Laurence Gate at Featherbed Lane.

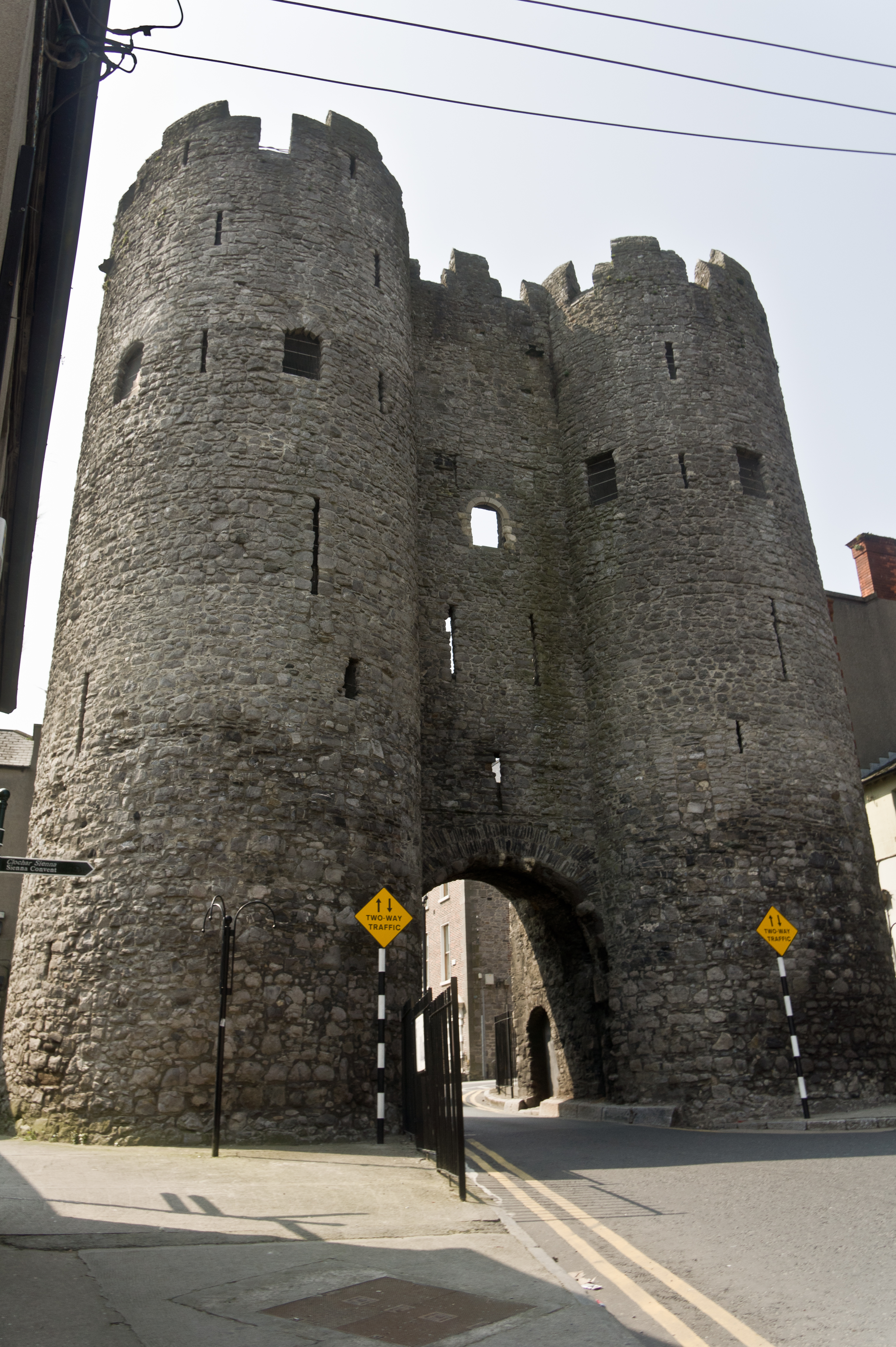
The gate viewed from the top of Constitution Hill.

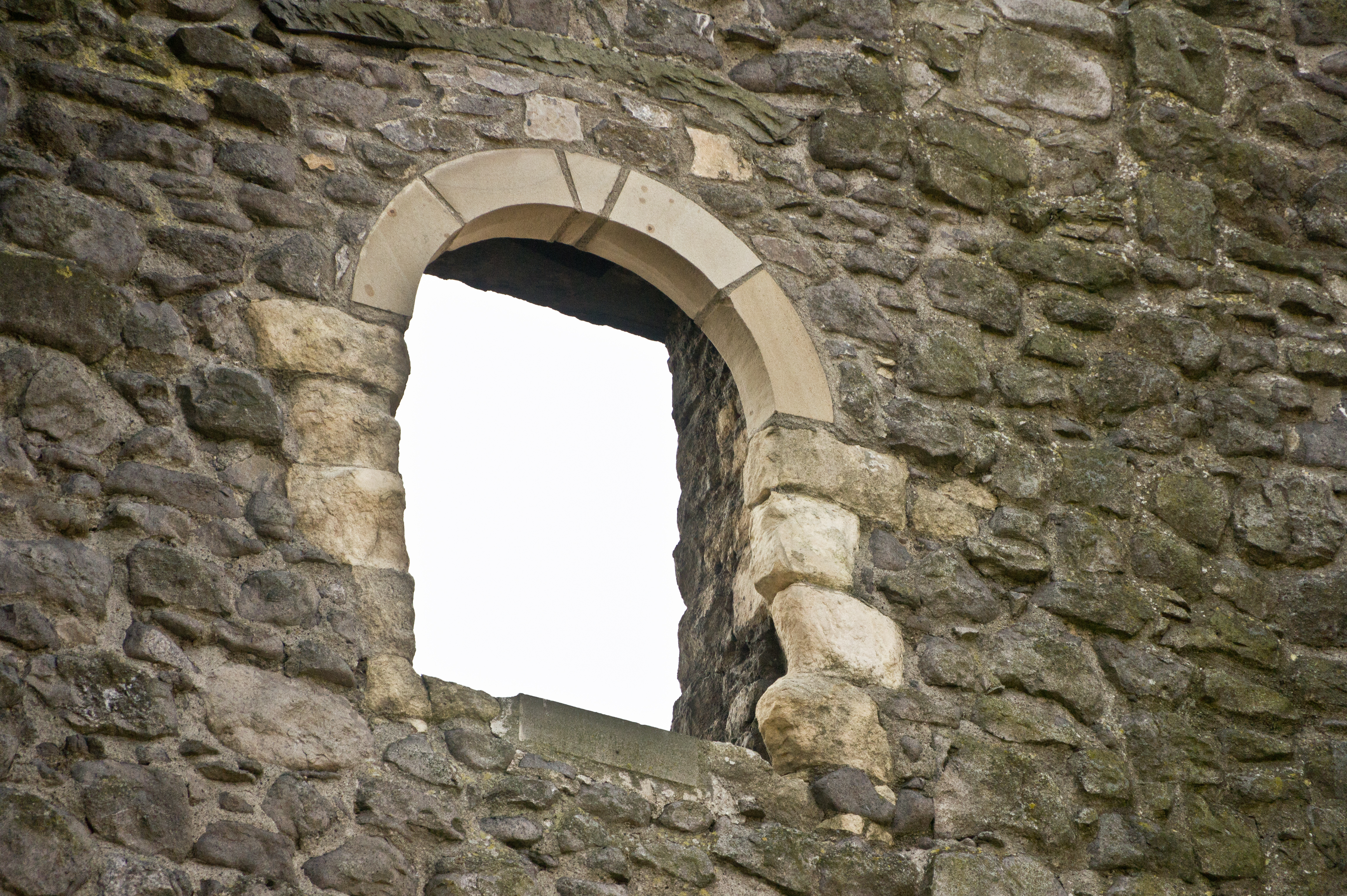
View point in the centre of the gate.
