= William Kenny (VC) =

Irish recipient of the Victoria Cross (1880–1936)

William Kenny VC
- Born: 24 August 1880; Drogheda, County Louth, Ireland
- Died: 10 January 1936 (aged 55); Hammersmith, England
- Burial place: Brookwood Cemetery; 51°18′00″N 0°37′33″W
- Military career
- Allegiance: United Kingdom
- Branch: British Army
- Rank: Drum-Major
- Units: The Gordon Highlanders
- Conflicts: Second Boer War; World War I
- Awards: Victoria Cross; Cross of St George (Russia)

William Kenny VC (24 August 1880 – 10 January 1936) was an Irish recipient of the Victoria Cross, the highest and most prestigious award for gallantry in the face of the enemy that can be awarded to British and Commonwealth forces.

== Victoria Cross ==
Kenny was 34 years old, and a Drummer in the 2nd Battalion, The Gordon Highlanders, British Army during the First World War when the following deed took place for which he was awarded the VC.

On 23 October 1914 near Ypres, Belgium, Drummer Kenny rescued wounded men on five occasions under very heavy fire. Twice previously he had saved machine-guns by carrying them out of action, and on numerous occasions he conveyed urgent messages under very dangerous circumstances over fire-swept ground.

== Other honours ==
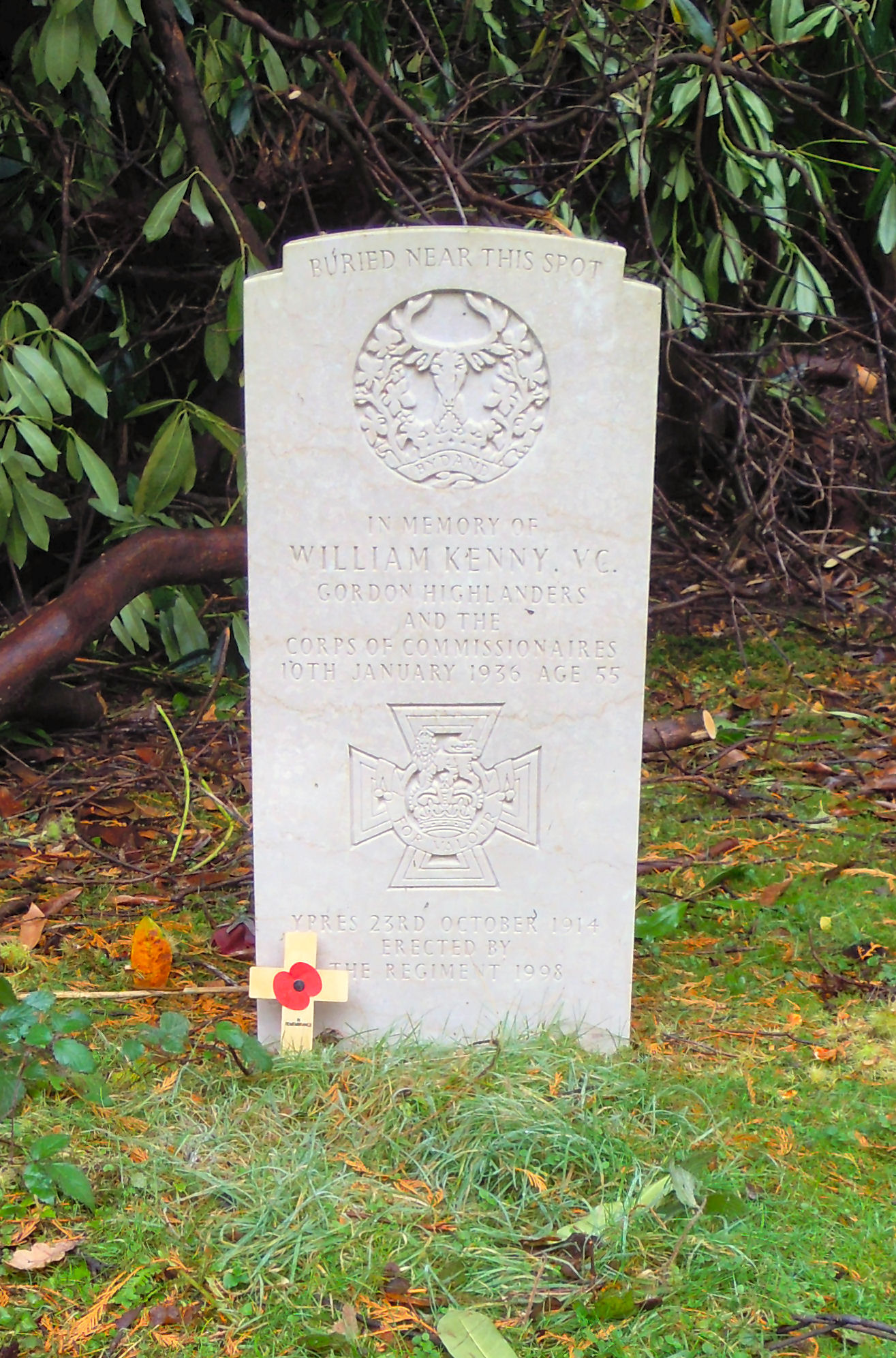
Kenny's grave in Brookwood Cemetery

In addition to the Victoria Cross, Kenny earned the rank of Drum-Major and was also awarded the following medals: Queen's South Africa Medal with bars, King's South Africa Medal with bars, 1914 Star with bar, British War Medal, Victory Medal with oak-leaf, Delhi Durbar Medal, and the Cross of St George (Russia).

On 20 March 1999 the grave of William Kenny received a new headstone in the Corps of Commissionaires plot at Brookwood Cemetery, arranged by The Gordon Highlanders London Association (Lt Col. M.H. Burge). Kenny was buried in 1936 but the original marker was lost and until this stone was placed, Kenny was not otherwise commemorated.

His Victoria Cross and other medals are on displayed at the Gordon Highlanders Museum, Aberdeen, Scotland.
