= Highlanes Gallery =

Public visual arts centre, Drogheda, County Louth, Ireland

- Gailearaí na Lánaí Arda
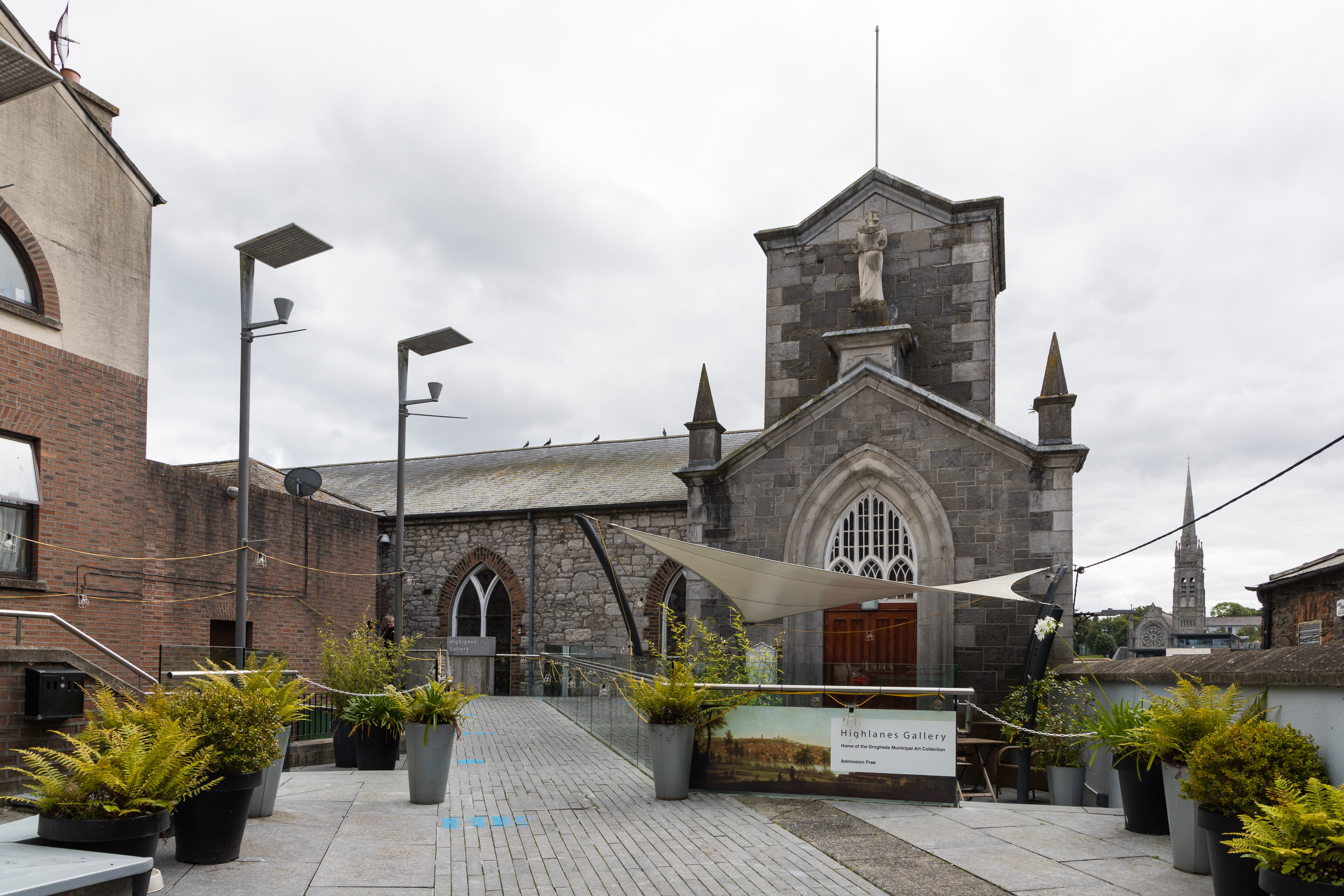

- Location within Ireland
- Established: 4 October 2006
- Location: 36 St Laurence St, Drogheda, County Louth, Ireland
- Coordinates: 53°42′56″N 6°20′55″W
- Type: art gallery
- Public transit access: Drogheda bus station (550 m); Drogheda (1.4 km)
- Parking: Bachelors Lane
- Website: highlanes.ie

Highlanes Gallery (Irish: Gailearaí na Lánaí Arda) is a public art gallery and visual arts exhibition centre in Drogheda, Ireland which opened in 2006.

== History ==
The gallery is sited in a former Franciscan church. It opened in 2006.

== Gallery ==
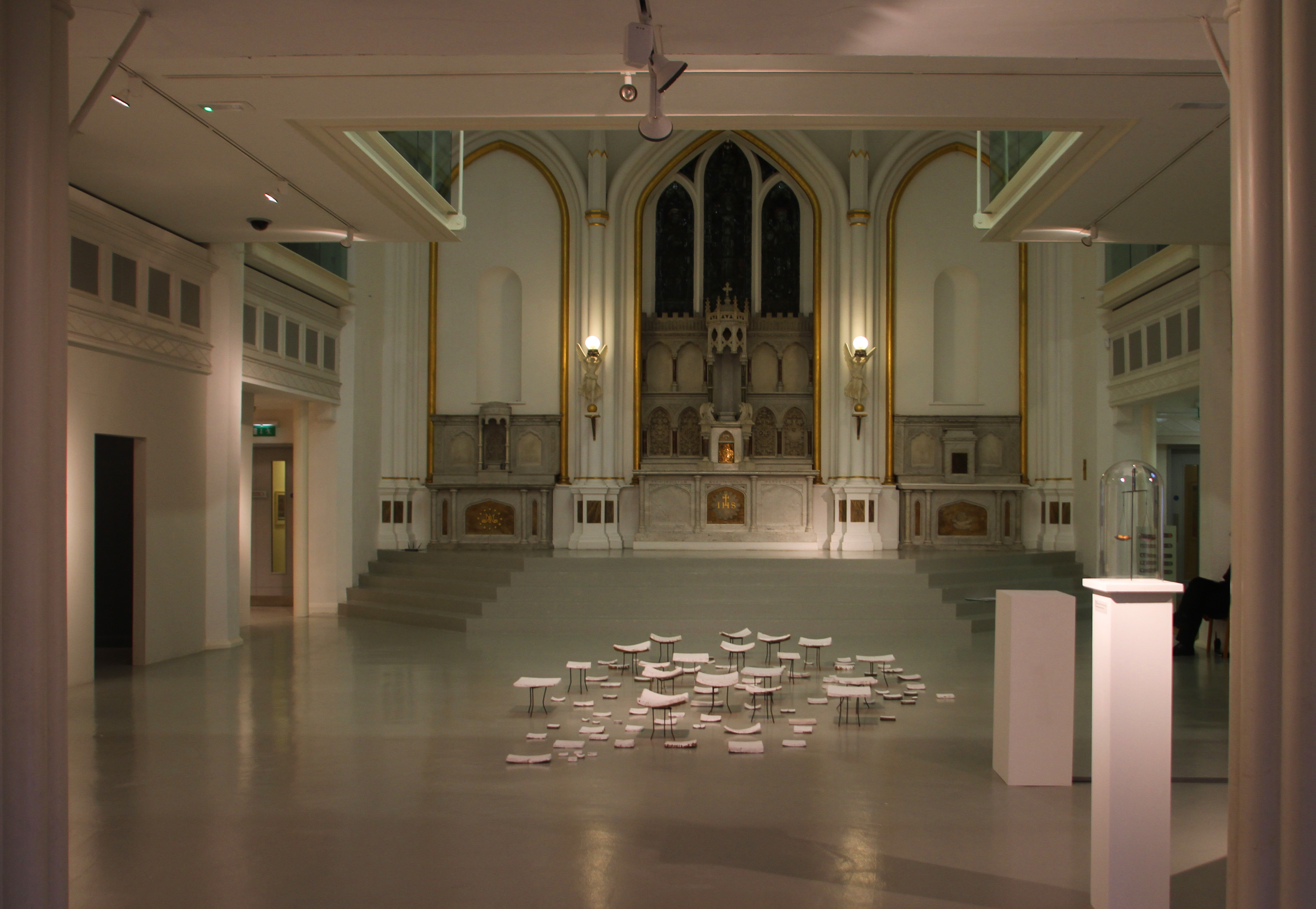
Art display in the Highlanes Gallery

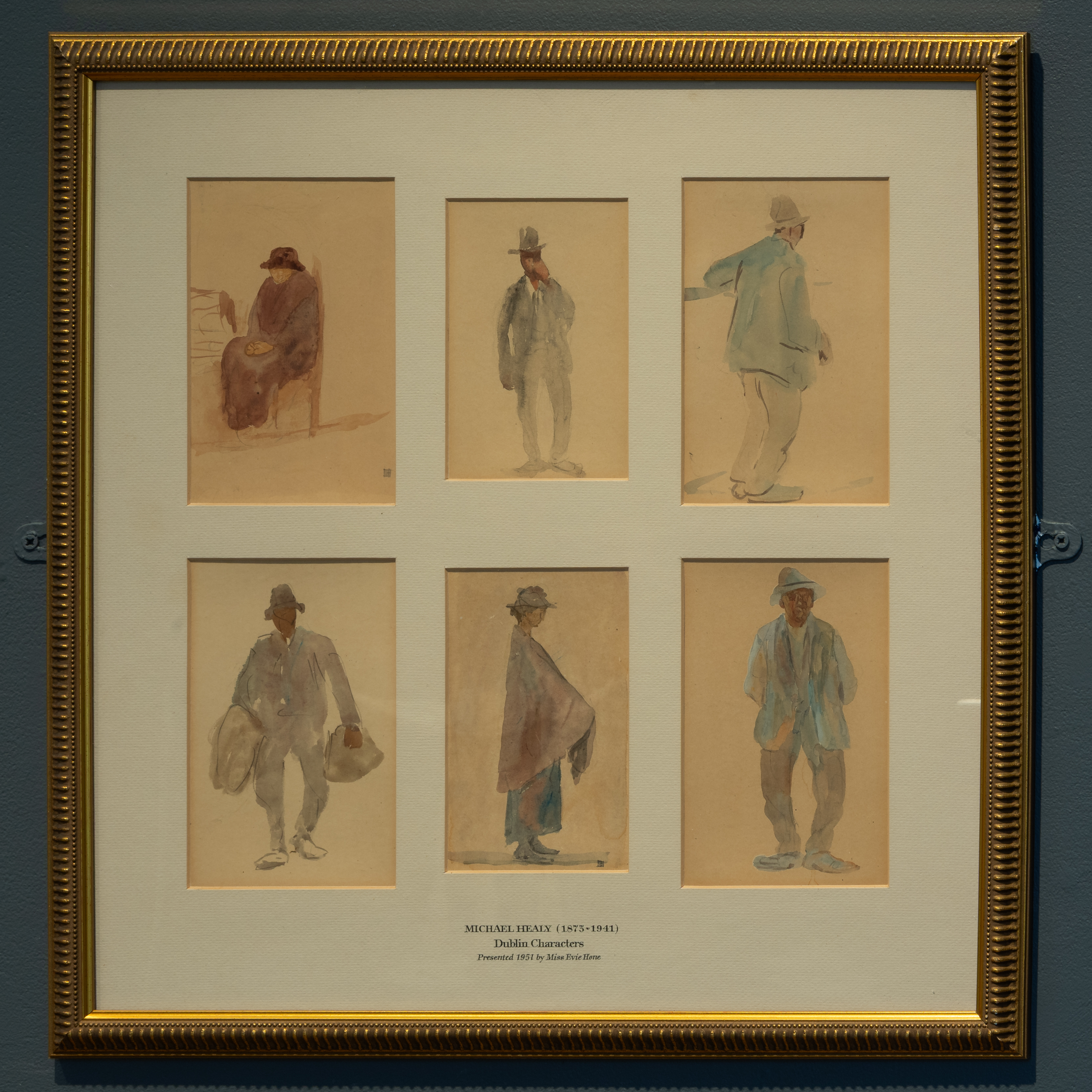
"Dublin Characters" by Michael Healy

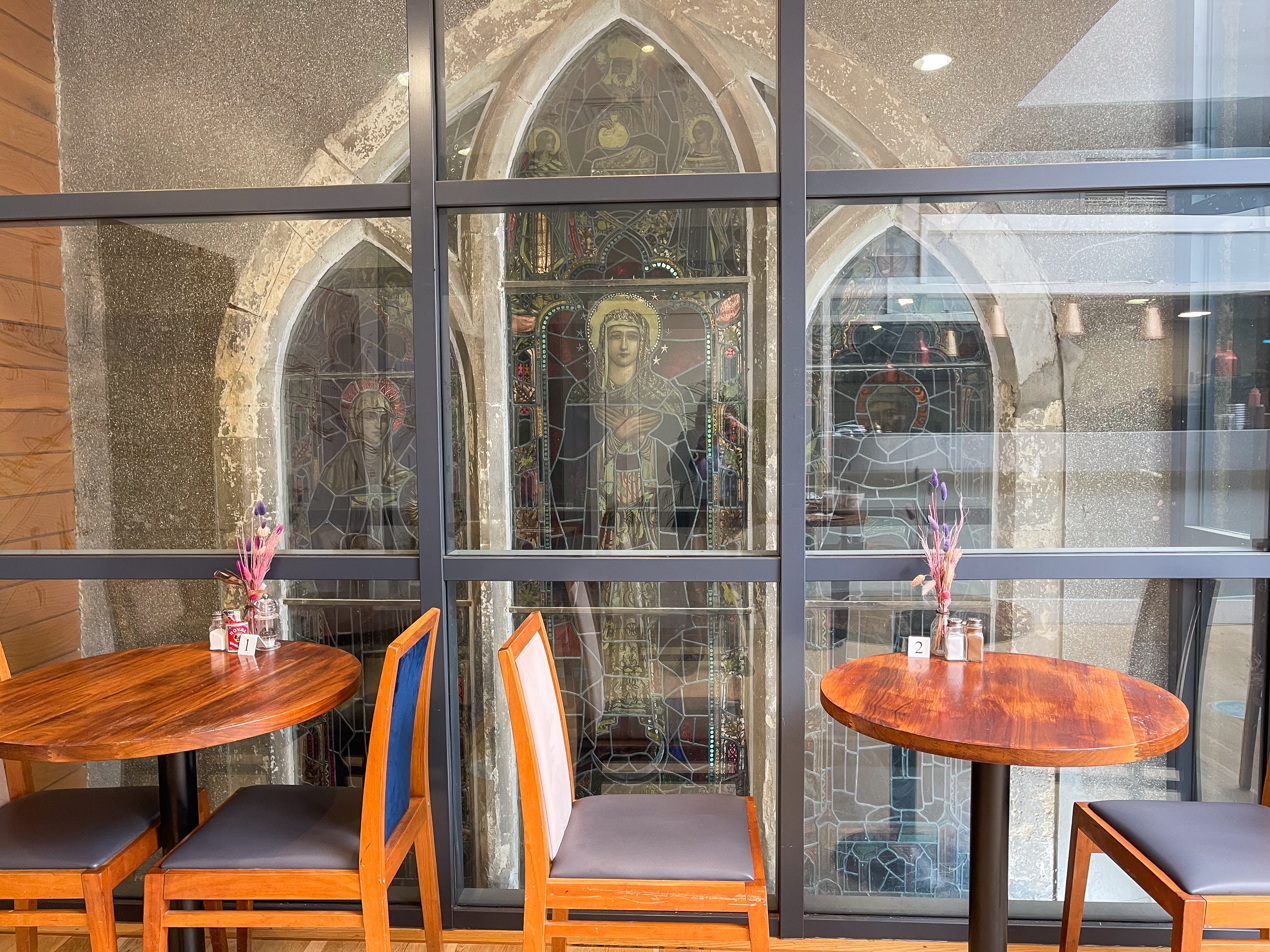
Cafe and east window

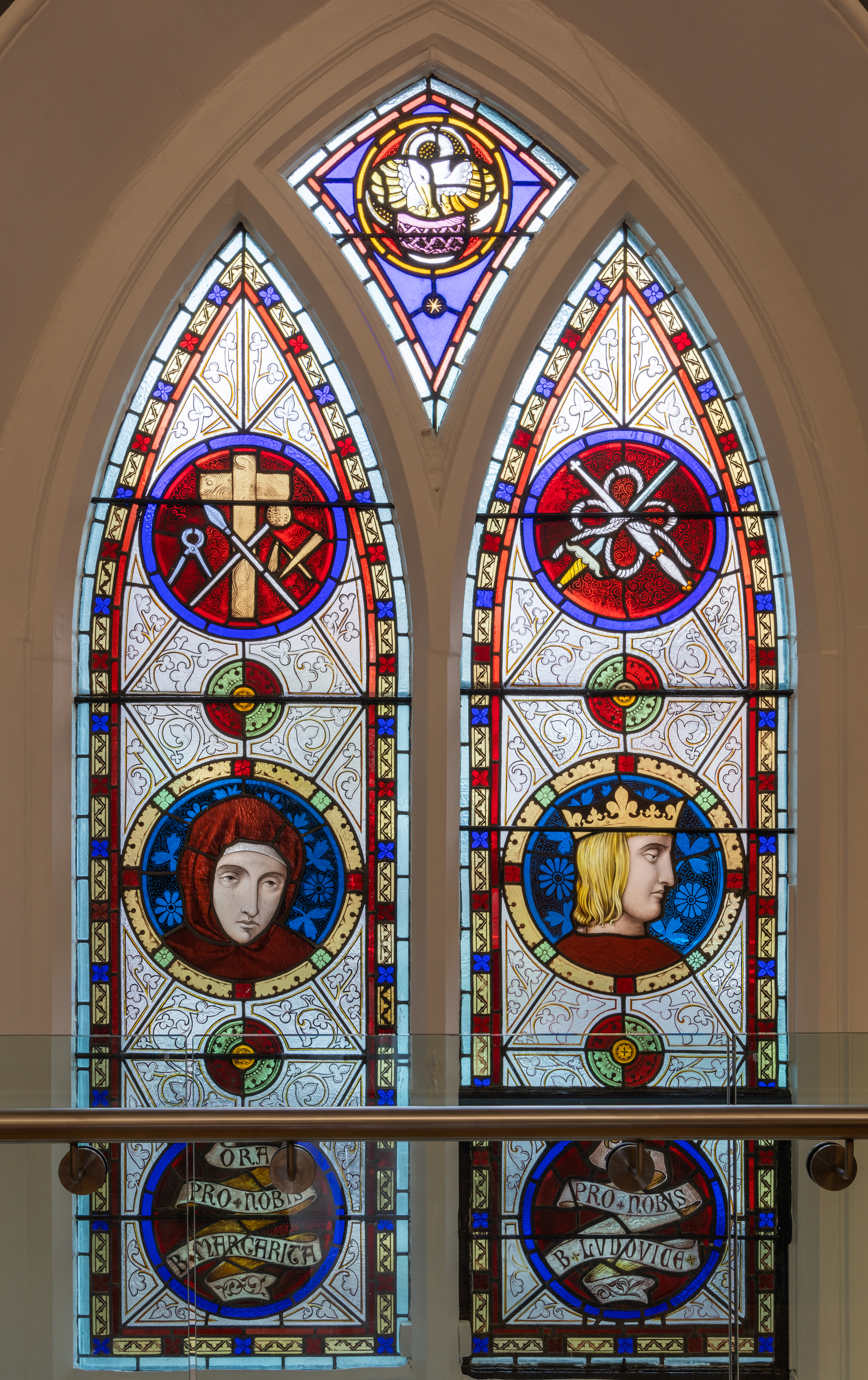
Stained glass window with images of Margaret of Cortona and Louis IX of France
