= Barbican =

Fortified outpost or gateway

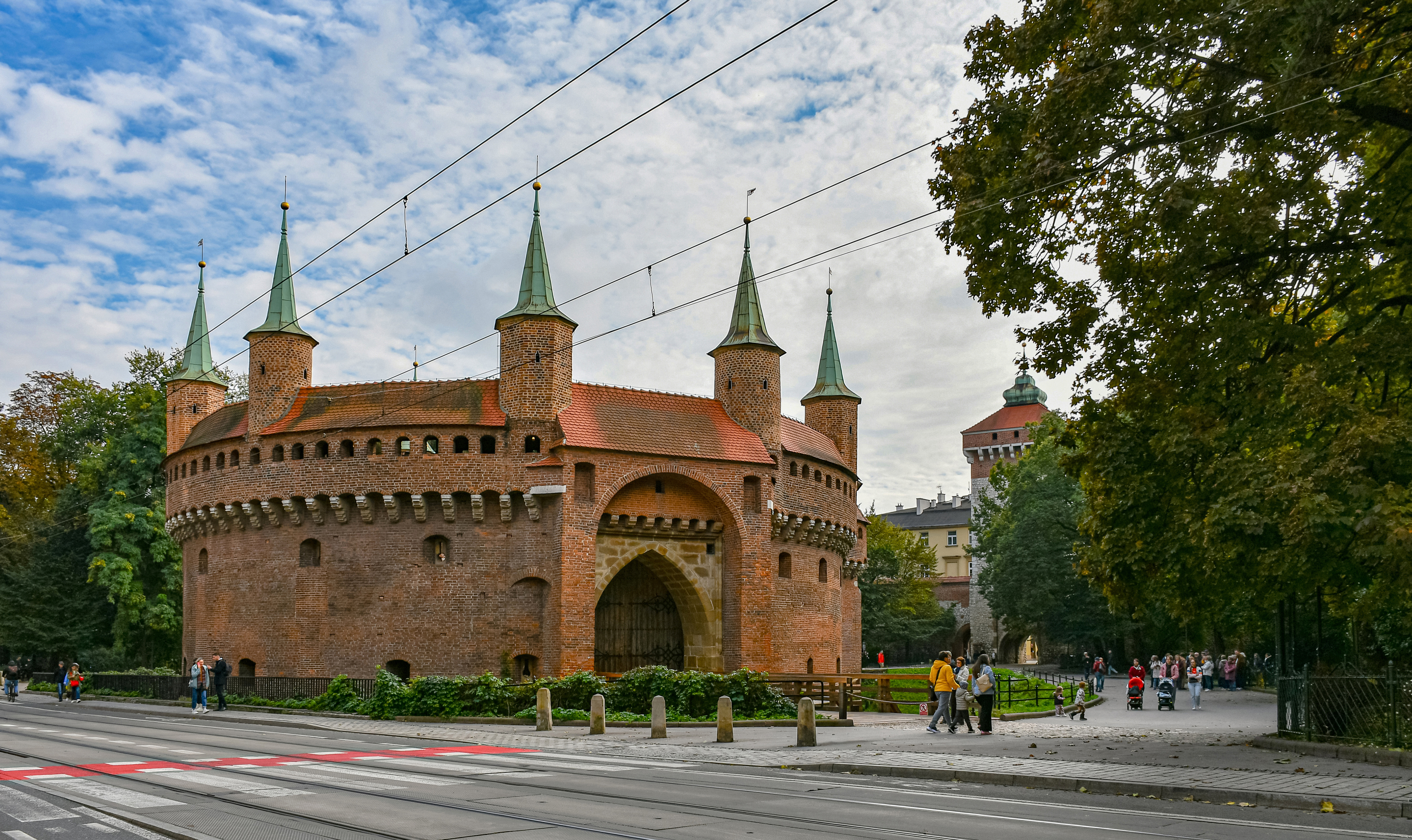
The Barbican in Kraków

A barbican (from Old French: barbacane) is a fortified outpost or fortified gateway, such as at an outer defense perimeter of a city or castle, or any tower situated over a gate or bridge which was used for defensive purposes.

== Europe ==
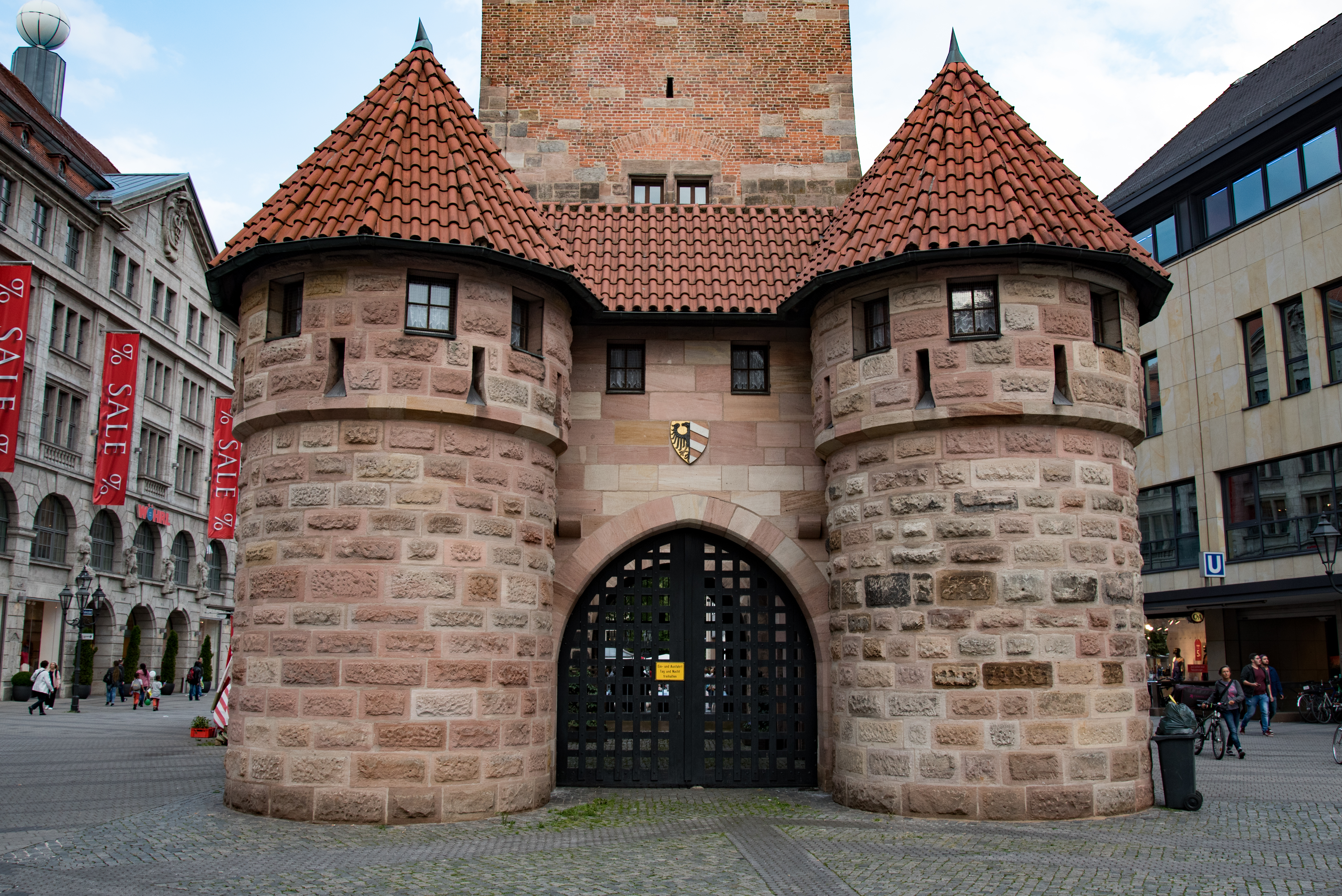
The barbican of the White Tower in Nuremberg (reconstruction)

Medieval Europeans typically built barbicans outside, or at the edge of, a main line of defenses, and connected them to defensive walls with a walled road called the neck. Barbicans would thus control the entrance to a city or castle at the "choke point". In the 15th century, as siege tactics and artillery developed, barbicans began to lose their significance, but new barbicans were built well into the 16th century. Fortified or mock-fortified gatehouses remained a feature of ambitious French and English residences well into the 17th century. Portuguese medieval fortification nomenclature uses the term "barbican" (barbacã) for any wall outside of and lower than the main defensive wall that forms a second barrier. The barrier may be complete, extensive or only protect particularly weak areas. The more restrictive term gate barbican refers to structures protecting gates.

== Arab world ==
The origin of the English word barbican is thought to be found in either Persian or Arabic (see here or here).

Paul Deschamps (1888–1974) interpreted the Arabic word bashura[h] as used in 13th-century chronicles to mean barbican, a defensive structure placed ahead of a gate but this has been debunked, bashura denoting rather an entire section of the outer fortifications, which may include a barbican but also a bastion, gate, tower, or all of these.

== South Asia ==
Barbicans were also used in South Asian fortifications to protect the main gate from being rammed by war elephants.

== East Asia ==
Fortifications in East Asia also feature similar high structures. In particular, gates in Chinese city walls were often defended by an additional "archery tower" in front of the main gatehouse, with the two towers connected by walls extending out from the main fortification. Literally called "jar walls", they are often referred to as "barbicans" in English.

== See also ==
- Gatehouse
- Kraków Barbican
- Warsaw Barbican
- Saint Laurence Gate, Drogheda
- Wall of Vilnius
