= Michael Holohan =

Irish composer (born 1956)

- Born: 27 March 1956 (age 70); Drumcondra, Dublin, Leinster, Ireland
- Education: University College Dublin (BA); Queen's University Belfast
- Occupation: Composer
- Years active: 1980s–present
- Organizations: Association of Irish Composers; Droichead Arts Centre; Aosdána; Arts Council / An Chomhairle Ealaíon
- Website: www.michaelholohan.net

Michael Holohan (born 27 March 1956) is an Irish composer.

== Biography ==
Holohan was born in Drumcondra, Dublin. He attended the O'Connell School and later studied at University College Dublin (BA, 1978) and Queen's University Belfast. He studied composition with Jane O'Leary, Eric Sweeney and Seóirse Bodley. He also attended masterclasses by Olivier Messiaen, Iannis Xenakis, Pierre Boulez, Luciano Berio and Helmut Lachenmann in France.

Holohan was chairman of the Association of Irish Composers from 1987 to 1989 and was later appointed chairman of the Droichead Arts Centre in Drogheda, where he has lived since 1983.

Holohan was elected to Aosdána in 1999 and later served as a member and chair of its Toscaireacht.

== Music ==
Holohan has composed for solo instrument, ensemble, orchestra, stage, choir, and voice, and has collaborated with poets, including Seamus Heaney, Tomas Tranströmer, Ivan V. Lalić and Paul Durcan.

His music has been performed and broadcast in Ireland and internationally. Career highlights in Drogheda have included performances of Cromwell (1994), The Mass of Fire (1995) and No Sanctuary (1997).

== Critical reception and recognition ==
Holohan's work has been reviewed in Irish music journalism. Writing in The Journal of Music following a National Concert Hall composers' showcase, Benedict Schlepper-Connolly described The Dream of Aengus as demonstrating Holohan's "orchestrational control", and characterised Portrait of the Artist as "captivating", while noting the influence of traditional Irish music within his choral writing.

Regional press coverage has also documented performances and recordings of his work, including reports on the release of the piano album Fields of Blue and White and concerts of his music in Drogheda.

== Selected works ==
=== Orchestral ===
- Cromwell (1994)
- Leaves of Glass (1995)
- Building Bridges (1995)

=== Ensemble ===
- Triangulum (1977)
- Macehead (1992)
- A Snail in My Prime (2000) – with text by Paul Durcan

=== Choir ===
- An Stoirm, Bagairt na Marbh and Sos (1981–84) – with texts by Seán Ó Ríordáin
- Anahorish and Oracle (1988) – with texts by Seamus Heaney
- Mass of Fire (1995)
- Quis est Deus? (2001)
- In the Empty Hills (2009) – with text by Wang Wei

=== Voice ===
- Kubla Khan (1974)
- Thomas McDonagh (1987) – with text by Francis Ledwidge
- The Given Note (1989) – with text by Seamus Heaney
- The Potter's Field (1990) – with text by Ivan V. Lalić

=== Solo ===
- By a River (1985), for piano
- Aoise (1988), for piano
- The Road to Lough Swilly (2001), for uilleann pipes
- Monaincha (2002), for piano

=== Stage ===
- Running Beast (2007) – with text by Donal O'Kelly
- Where a Single Footprint Lasts a Thousand Years (2009) – with text by Ernest Shackleton and Bill Manhire

=== Electro-acoustic ===
- The Source (1990)
- July 23rd Dawn (1990)

== Selected discography ==
- A River of Memories (1999)
- Fields of Blue and White (2010)
- The Road to Lough Swilly (2019)
