= John O'Callaghan (politician) =

John O'Callaghan (?–1913) was National Secretary of the United Irish League and a staff writer on The Boston Globe.
