= Moneymore, New Zealand =

Farming community in South Otago, New Zealand

Coordinates: 46°09′30″S 169°54′15″E

Moneymore is a small farming community in South Otago, New Zealand. It is located 5 kilometres to the southwest of Milton, to the south of SH 1.

Other than farming on the fertile ground of the Tokomairaro Plain, the Moneymore area also has a history of coal mining, associated with the nearby lignite field at Kaitangata.

The farming area was founded by Edward Martin in 1852, who founded Moneymore Farm, named for his birthplace in Moneymore, County Londonderry, (Northern) Ireland. At the time, the area was simply known as South Toko, but was formally renamed Moneymore in 1902.
