= Moneymore, Drogheda =

Housing estate in Drogheda, Ireland

Coordinates: 53.728°N 6.352°W

Moneymore (Irish: An Mhónaidh Mhór, meaning 'large bog') is a townland and housing estate in Drogheda, County Louth, Ireland. The townland of Moneymore lies on the northside of Drogheda, and has an area of approximately 2.9 square kilometres (1 sq mi).

Moneymore estate comprises both bungalow and two storey homes. Built in the 1980s by Drogheda Corporation (now Drogheda Borough Council), the housing estate contains 244 houses, a boxing club, Moneymore Football Club, Moneymore Community Creche and Connect Family Resource Centre.

In March 2009, there was a large house fire at Moneymore, in which the residents of the house, the McDonagh family, lost three family members.

As of 2020, the Moneymore estate was reported to be site of violence related to a "gangland" "drug feud".

== Sport ==
Moneymore Playing Fields are on council owned land zoned for recreational purposes in the 1980s in accordance with the building of Moneymore Estate at the same time. The playing fields were used by Moneymore Football Club, which was run by the residents of Moneymore throughout the 1980s. However, Moneymore Football Club was dissolved in the mid 1990s and was only reformed in 2003 by which time the playing fields were a derelict meadow with burnt-out cars. Moneymore Playing Fields now consists of 1 x 11 - a side pitch (standard size) and 2 x 7 - a side pitches (standard size) with a boundary fence and gate to gain entry. This was erected in 2006 through a Peace 11 grant that was awarded to Moneymore FC due to its ongoing work in peace and reconciliation through sport with football clubs from Northern Ireland.

Moneymore FC grew with accreditation, in particular with Girls Football. Their developing Girls U-14 team were on the losing end of the 2006 Drogheda and District League Cup Final, but were crowned League DDSL champions in 2006, and went on to win the U-14's Dublin Women's Soccer League during that summer. The girls team also won the U-14 Drogheda and District League and Cup Final in 2007 and went out in 2008 to win the Girls U-16 North Dublin Brenfer League and Cup Double.

== Public transport ==
Moneymore is served by Bus Éireann route number 173, the Northside Drogheda Town Service. There is a bus every hour daytime Mondays to Saturdays inclusive.
