= James Lennon (bishop) =

Irish Catholic Bishop

James Lennon (b. Armagh 26 September 1923; d. Drogheda 17 October 1989) was an Irish Catholic bishop in the last third of the 20th century.

Lenny was educated at St Patrick's Grammar School, Armagh and St Patrick's College, Maynooth. He was ordained priest for Armagh on 20 June 1948. He served curacies at Collon, Saul, Mellifont and Cookstown. He was appointed parish priest of Termonfeckin in 1975 and of Drogheda in 1977. Lennon was appointed an auxiliary bishop of Armagh in 1980.
