= Belew =

Belew is a surname. Notable people with this surname include:

- Adrian Belew (born 1949), American rock musician
- Bill Belew (1931–2008), American costume designer
- Carl Belew (1931–1990), American country singer-songwriter
- Cody Belew, contestant on The Voice (U.S. season 3)
- David Owen Belew Jr. (1920–2001), American District Court judge
- Kathleen Belew, an assistant professor of history at the University of Chicago, who is said to be an expert on the white-power movement
- Ruth O'Neal Belew, (died 1973), American illustrator

== See also ==
- Ballew
- Ballou
- Bellew
