= Battle of Killala =

Battle of the Irish Rebellion of 1798

- Part of the United Irishmen Rebellion
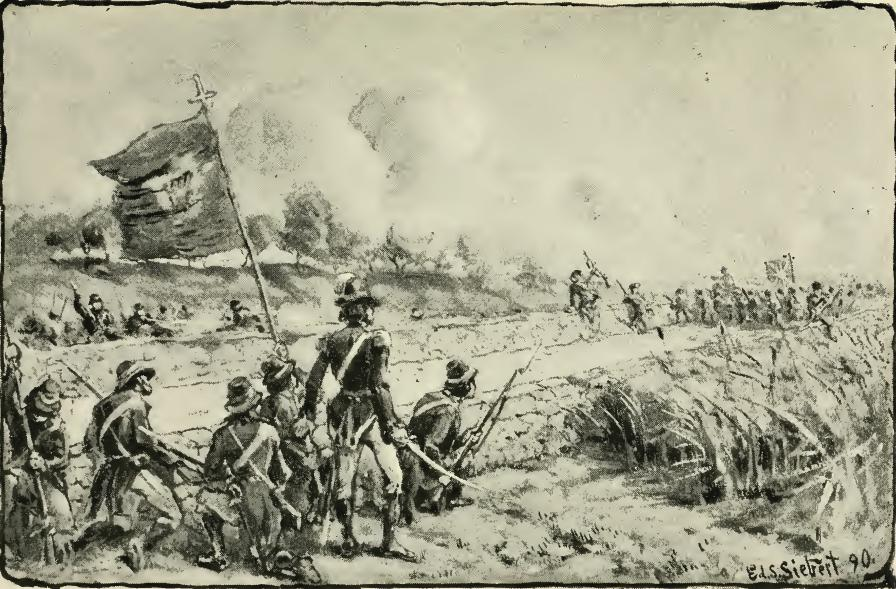
- Battle of Killala by Edward Seibert
Date	22 August 1798
Location	Killala, County Mayo 54.2125°N 9.2219°W
Result	British victory

Belligerents
United Irishmen; France	Great Britain; Ireland

Commanders and leaders
Lt. Col. Charost; Cap. Bellew; Richard Bourke; Roger MacGuire; Henry O'Keane	Eyre Trench

Strength
900–4,000 Irish, 4 French officers	1,200

Casualties and losses
400–500 dead	1 dead 10 wounded (British claim)

The Battle of Killala was an engagement during the Irish Rebellion of 1798. It was fought on Sunday, 23 September 1798, between forces of the British Crown and a combined force of Irish rebels and a small number of French troops at Killala, County Mayo, Ireland.

== Background ==
On the day before the battle, the advance of a government force led by General Eyre Power Trench was visible miles from Killala, as it was marked by smoke from houses and cabins burned along the route. Prior to the battle, Rebels and refugees began pouring into Killala – especially from the direction of Ballina. The morning was marked by heavy rainfall, but this cleared before noon. The French troops present at the battle included only 4 officers: Charoust, Boudet, Ponson, and Truc. Truc had arrived on the morning of the battle from Ballina.

== The battle ==
The main body of Rebels occupied rising ground about a mile outside the town of Killala, on the road to Ballina. They positioned themselves behind low stone walls on each side of the road, which acted as breastworks. Other Rebels were positioned elsewhere near the town, correctly anticipating that Trench would split his forces for the attack. The government force approached the town in two divisions, each from a different direction. One of these divisions approached in the direction of where the Rebels were stationed on the Ballina road and a sharp engagement took place when the two sides met. This lasted for about twenty minutes, until the Rebels fell back into the town. They were pursued by government troops as they did so and, as a result, the rebel force sustained heavy casualties – both within the town and in the fields surrounding it.

== Aftermath ==
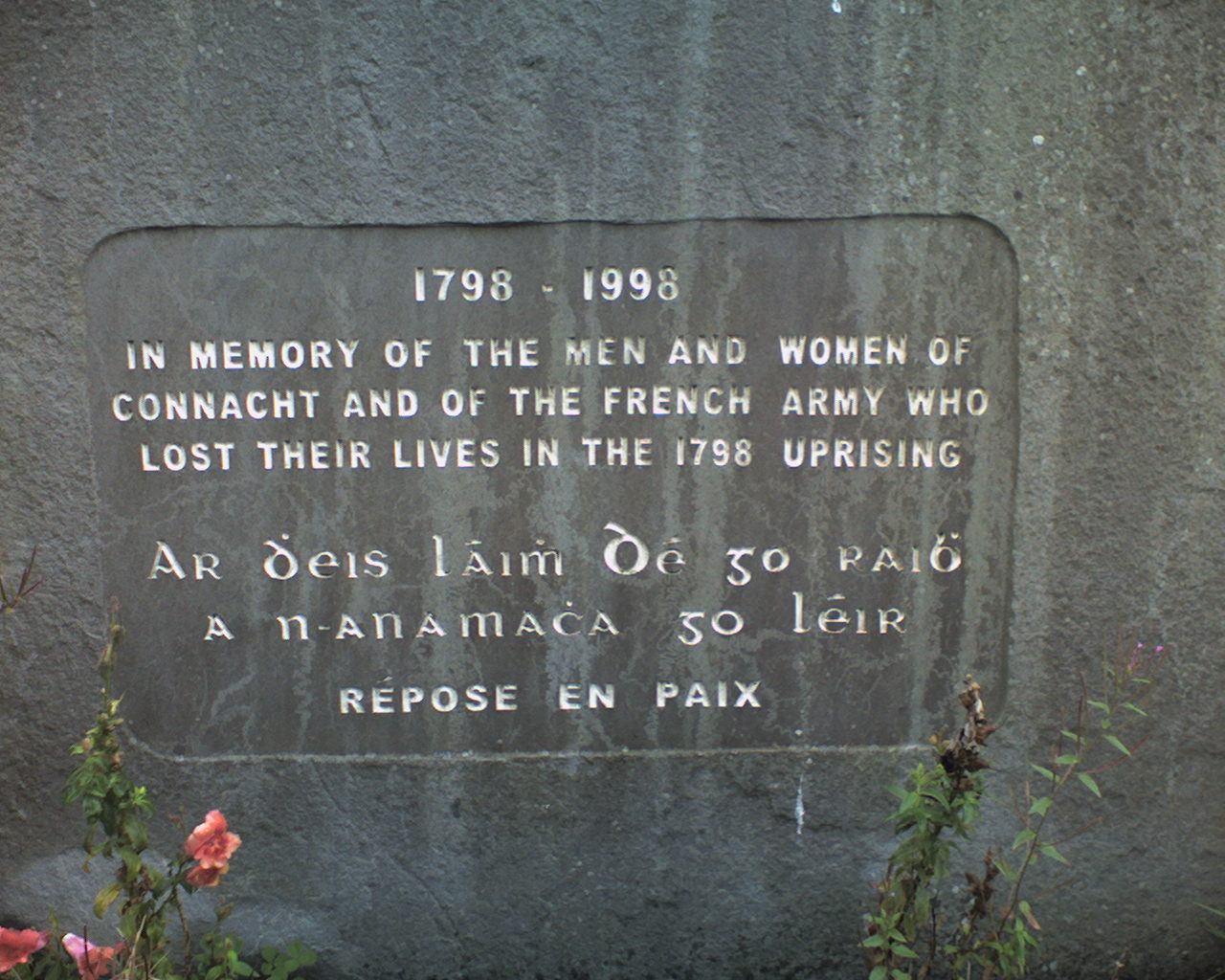
Memorial located at the main site of the Battle.

The defeat was the last major engagement of the Irish Rebellion 1798 on land; Killala had remained under rebel control for only thirty-two days. After the battle, government forces conducted sweeps in the town and the surrounding countryside, summarily executing any captured rebel found and burning houses suspected of harbouring rebels. These sweeps led to the deaths of several civilians, some of whom were loyalists. The four French officers were captured during the battle, and were afterwards sent to Dublin, and from there to London. Irishman Henry O'Keane, though he was an officer in the French Revolutionary Army, was sent to Castlebar instead, where he was court-martialled. O'Keane was spared the death penalty, though he was exiled instead and forbidden to ever set foot on any territory under Crown control.

A series of courts-martial began the day after the battle. The proceedings took place at a house in Killala owned by local resident Owen Morrisson. Two rebel commanders, Richard Bourke and Captain Bellew, were tried on Monday evening and found guilty. They were executed the next morning in the park behind the town castle. Another prominent rebel commander, Roger MacGuire, was transported to Botany Bay instead, while his father was hanged. Courts-martial and executions of other captured rebels continued for a week. In total, seventy-five prisoners were court-martialled at Killala. The Church of Ireland Bishop of Killala and Achonry, Joseph Stock, left the most detailed eye-witness account of the battle. It was published in 1800.

== Sources ==
- Gordon, James B. History of the Rebellion in Ireland in the year 1798, &c. London, 1803.
- Gribayédoff, Valerian. The French invasion of Ireland in '98. Leaves of unwritten history that tell of an heroic endeavour and a lost opportunity to throw off England's yoke. New York: Charles P. Somerby, 1890.
- Maxwell, William Hamilton. History of the Irish Rebellion in 1798; with Memoirs of the Union, and Emmett's Insurrection in 1803. 7th edition. London: Bell and Daldy, 1866.
- Musgrave, Richard. Memoirs of the Different Rebellions in Ireland. Vol. 2 of 2. Third edition. Dublin, 1802.
- Stock, Joeseph. A Narrative of what passed at Killalla, in the County of Mayo, and the parts adjacent, during the French invasion in the summer of 1798. Dublin & London, 1800.
- Teeling, Charles Hamilton. Sequel to Personal Narrative of the "Irish Rebellion" of 1798. Belfast: John Hodgson, 1832.
