= Eddie & the Gang with No Name =

Young adult novel series by Colin Bateman

- Reservoir Pups; Bring Me the Head of Oliver Plunkett; The Seagulls Have Landed
- Author: Colin Bateman
- Country: United Kingdom
- Language: English
- Genre: Crime, young adult
- Publisher: Hodder Children's
- Media type: Print
- No. of books: 3

The Eddie & the Gang with No Name series is a trilogy of young-adult novels, written by Northern Irish author Colin Bateman. The trilogy surrounds a twelve-year-old Eddie and his affiliation with a local gang, the "Reservoir Pups". The trilogy was bought by the publisher Random House for release in America. However, given the drug-related content in the third installment of the series, Random House decided to publish only the first two novels.

== Characters ==
- Eddie Malone – thirteen-year-old boy, protagonist of the story.
- Eddie's mum – mother of Eddie and heavily pregnant with Scuttles' child.
- Bernard Scuttles – chief of hospital security and boyfriend of Eddie's mum.
- Mo – female albino best friend of Eddie.

Since Bring Me the Head of Oliver Plunkett

- Gary Gilmore – friend of Eddie who is fond of explosives and explosions in general.
- Pat – runaway orphan, friend of Eddie.
- Sean – also a runaway orphan and friend of Eddie.

== Reservoir Pups ==
Reservoir Pups
- Author: Colin Bateman
- Publication date: 13 November 2003
- Pages: 312
- ISBN: 9780340877807
- OCLC: 52921494

Reservoir Pups (also known as Running with the Reservoir Pups) is the first novel of the Eddie & the Gang with No Name trilogy by Colin Bateman, published on 13 November 2003 through Hodder Children's Books. It is Bateman's first young adult novel.

=== Plot ===
In 1978 Eddie's father leaves his mother to run away with her boss, a doctor. His mother finds herself a new nursing job at the Royal Victoria Maternity Hospital, however it's located in a run-down section of Belfast; the pair move there regardless. A short time after they arrive, Scuttles, the chief of hospital security, accuses Eddie of scamming the locals and of being part of a neighbourhood gang, the "Reservoir Pups".

Given that all the people in his life believe he is already part of the gang, Eddie decides to join. He is tasked with stealing the security codes from Scuttles' computer and while attempting to do so, hears of a plot to kidnap twelve babies from the hospital nursery, abandoning his mission. Returning to the gang, Eddie is ostracised for his failure to complete his task and he is told to "watch his back". Eddie then sets out to foil the kidnapping himself.

=== Reservoir Pups characters ===
- Captain Black – paraplegic boy and leader of the gang.
- Alison Beech – owner of the cosmetics company that is attempting to kidnap the babies.

== Bring Me the Head of Oliver Plunkett ==
Bring Me the Head of Oliver Plunkett
- Author: Colin Bateman
- Publication date: 13 May 2004
- Pages: 315
- ISBN: 9780340877814
- OCLC: 55021694

Bring Me the Head of Oliver Plunkett is the second novel of the Eddie & the Gang with No Name trilogy by Northern Irish author, Colin Bateman, published on 13 May 2004 through Hodder Children's Books. The story was initially written in 1995–96 as a feature film script aimed at adults. It was sold in 1996 although, as of 2012, no further information has been released. When Bateman was attempting to write the sequel to Reservoir Pups, he found this script, "threw most of it out"; and re-aimed it at the young-adult audience.

=== Plot ===
Two runaway orphans, Pat and Sean, witness the theft of Saint Oliver Plunketts head from St. Peter's Church where it was on display for a forthcoming papal visit. Pat speaks to the primate of the church and discovers that he will be greatly embarrassed by the disappearance; Pat decides to help as he is feeling guilty for not preventing the crime initially. The orphans enlist the help of Eddie and his best-friend Mo in their task. Eddie and Mo, meanwhile, have been involved in some tasks for the Reservoir Pups which coincidentally involve the son of Scarface Cutler; a blind boy named Ivan and son of the thief in possession of the head.

=== Bring Me the Head of Oliver Plunkett characters ===
- The primate – stands to be greatly embarrassed by the loss of the head.
- Scarface Cutler – violent criminal and holder of Plunkett's head.
- Ivan – blind son of Cutler.

== The Seagulls Have Landed ==
The Seagulls Have Landed
- Author: Colin Bateman
- Publication date: 19 May 2005
- Pages: 458
- ISBN: 9780340877821
- OCLC: 60521133

The Seagulls Have Landed is the third novel of the Eddie & the Gang with No Name trilogy by Northern Irish author, Colin Bateman, published on 19 May 2005 through Hodder Children's Books. Random House decided not to publish the book in America due to the drug-related content in this instalment of the series.

=== Plot ===
Eddies loses his newborn half-brother and enlists his gang with no name to help him find him. In doing so Eddie discovers that a gang named The Seagulls, which is the nickname for a large number of immigrants fleeing a natural disaster, are distributing a highly addictive drug called Crush. Eddie and his gang try to stop them whilst finding his lost brother in the process.
