= Ballou =

Ballou may refer to:

== Places ==
=== United States ===
- Ballou, Ohio, an unincorporated community
- Ballou, Oklahoma, a census-designated place
- Ballou, Wisconsin, an unincorporated community
- Ballou High School in Washington, D.C.

=== Elsewhere ===
- Mount Ballou, Victoria Land, Antarctica
- Ballou, Senegal

== People ==
=== In arts and media ===
==== Writers ====
- Addie L. Ballou (1837–1916), American suffragist, poet, artist, author and lecturer
- Ella Maria Ballou (1852-1937), American stenographer, reporter, essayist, and educator
- Emily Ballou, Australian-American poet, novelist and screenwriter
- Hosea Ballou (1771–1852), American clergyman and theological writer
- Joyce Ballou Gregorian (1946–1991), American author
- Mary Ballou (1809–1904), American memoirist
- Maturin Murray Ballou (1820–1895), writer and publisher
- Robert O. Ballou (1892 – 1977), writer and publisher

==== Musicians ====
- Dave Ballou, American musician
- Esther Ballou (1915–1973), American musician and composer
- Kurt Ballou (born 1974), American guitarist with the band Converge

==== In other arts ====
- Bud Ballou (1942–1977), American radio personality
- Michael Ballou, American artist
- Tyson Ballou (born 1976), fashion model

=== In education and academia ===
- Clinton Ballou (1923–2021), American biochemist
- David Ballou, American chemist and professor
- Ella Maria Ballou (1852-1937), American stenographer, reporter, essayist, and educator
- Frank Ballou (1879–1955), American school administrator
- Hosea Ballou II (1796–1861), first president of Tufts University, grand-nephew of clergyman Hosea Ballou

=== In religion ===
- Adin Ballou (1803–1890), American pacifist and Unitarian minister
- Hosea Ballou (1771–1852), American clergyman and theological writer

=== In politics ===
- Addie L. Ballou (1837–1916), American suffragist, poet, artist, author and lecturer
- Adin Ballou (1803–1890), American pacifist
- Latimer Whipple Ballou (1812–1900), American politician
- Maude Ballou (1925-2009), American Civil Rights activist
- Phineas D. Ballou (1823–1877), American businessperson and politician
- Richard A. Ballou, American politician
- Sidney M. Ballou (1870–1929), American judge
- Sullivan Ballou (1829–1861), American politician

=== In sport ===
- Adam Ballou (born 1992), American Paralympic soccer player
- Ballou Tabla (born 1999), Canadian soccer player
- Mike Ballou (born 1947), American football player
- Win Ballou (1897–1963), American Major League Baseball pitcher

=== Others ===
- Adin Ballou Underwood (1828–1888), American army officer

== Other uses ==
- The title character of Cat Ballou, a 1965 comedy western film
- Wally Ballou, a fictional recurring character created by the American comedy duo Bob and Ray

== See also ==
- Ballouville, Connecticut
- Baloo, a main character in Rudyard Kipling's story collection The Jungle Book
- Palwankar Baloo (1876–1955), Indian cricketer
