= Bellew =

Bellew is a surname of Irish origin. Notable people with the surname include:

- Cosmo Kyrle Bellew (1874–1948), British/American film actor
- Edward Donald Bellew (1882–1961), Canadian recipient of the Victoria Cross for action in WWI
- Francie Bellew (born 1976), Irish Gaelic footballer
- Frank Bellew (1828–1888), American artist; created the iconic image of Uncle Sam
- George Bellew (1899–1993), British army officer, genealogist, and armorer
- Henry Walter Bellew (1834–1892), Indian-born British medical officer and author
- Jack Bellew (1901–1957), Australian journalist and publisher
- Kyrle Bellew (1850–1911), British stage actor
- Ray Bellew (1939–2006), Canadian actor
- Richard Bellew, or Richard Bellewe, (fl. 1575–1585), legal reporter
- Richard Bellew (1803–1880), Irish politician
- Thomas Bellew (Galway politician) (1820–1863), Irish landowner and politician from Mountbellew
- Thomas Bellew (Louth politician) (1943–1995), Irish politician from Louth
- Tom Bellew (1922–2001) Australian Rugby League administrator
- Tony Bellew (born 1982), British professional boxer
- Peter Bellew (born 1965) CEO Malaysia Airlines

Irish peerage

- Baron Bellew, any of several barons in the peerage of Ireland
- Baron Bellew of Duleek, a previous baronetcy of Ireland; created 1686, extinct 1770
- Grattan-Bellew baronets, baronetcy in Mount Bellew, County Galway, Ireland
