= Sir Patrick Bellew, 5th Baronet =

Irish Roman Catholic activist

Sir Patrick Bellew, 5th Baronet (c. 1726 – 5 March 1795), was an Irish Roman Catholic activist.

== Biography ==
Bellew was born at Barmeath Castle, County Louth, the second son of Sir Edward Bellew, 3rd Baronet, and Eleanor Moore. In 1750, he inherited the family estate and baronetcy from his elder brother, Sir John Bellew, 4th Baronet.

He was involved in Irish Catholic politics from the early 1760s, petitioning for Catholics to be allowed enter the army in 1762. By the 1770s, he was a leading figure in the Catholic Committee and he was appointed to its select committee in 1778. That year he visited England to lobby for repeal of the Penal Laws against Irish Catholics; this was in part achieved by the passing of the Papists Act 1778. He also helped raise funds for Catholic political activity. In 1783 he presided at two meetings of the Catholic Committee at which he disputed claims that Irish Catholics were opposed to parliamentary reform. Despite his friendship with the Protestant bishop Frederick Hervey, 4th Earl of Bristol, he was viewed with suspicion by some in the Dublin Castle administration, who suspected Bellew of supplying the Catholic Committee with arms for an insurrection. In a March 1785 Committee meeting, however, he argued that the committee should concentrate on securing further relief solely through constitutional means. In the early 1790s, he became disillusioned with the Committee and followed Thomas Browne, 4th Viscount Kenmare, in seceding from the organisation in December 1791.

On 18 August 1756, he married Mary Hore, the daughter and co-heiress of Matthew Hore of County Waterford; they had nine sons and two daughters. He died on 5 March 1795 at his Barmeath Castle home. He was succeeded in his title by his eldest son, Edward.

Baronetage of Ireland
Preceded by John Bellew	Baronet of Barmeath; 1750–1795	Succeeded by Edward Bellew
