= Bring Me the Head of Oliver Plunkett =

2004 young adult novel by Colin Bateman

- Author: Colin Bateman
- Language: English
- Series: Eddie & the Gang with No Name
- Genre: Crime, young adult
- Publisher: Hodder Children's
- Publication date: 13 May 2004
- Publication place: United Kingdom
- Media type: Print (Softcover)
- Pages: 315
- ISBN: 9780340877814
- OCLC: 55021694
- Preceded by: Reservoir Pups (2003)
- Followed by: The Seagulls Have Landed (2005)

Bring Me the Head of Oliver Plunkett is the second novel of the Eddie & the Gang with No Name trilogy by Northern Irish author, Colin Bateman, published on 13 May 2004 through Hodder Children's Books.

== Plot ==
The story surrounds a twelve-year-old named Eddie and his affiliation with a local gang, known as the "Reservoir Pups".

Two runaway orphans, Pat and Sean, witness the theft of Saint Oliver Plunkett’s head from St. Peter's Church in Drogheda, where it was on display for a forthcoming papal visit. Pat speaks to the primate of the church and discovers that he will be greatly embarrassed by the disappearance; Pat decides to help as he is feeling guilty for not preventing the crime initially. The orphans enlist the help of Eddie and his best-friend Mo in their task. Eddie and Mo, meanwhile, have been involved in some tasks for the Reservoir Pups which coincidentally involve the son of Scarface Cutler; a blind boy named Ivan and son of the thief in possession of the head.

=== Characters ===
- Eddie Malone; twelve-year-old boy, protagonist of the story.
- Mo; female albino best-friend of Eddie and leader of the Andytown Albinos gang.
- Pat; runaway orphan boy who enlists Eddie in finding the head of the Saint Oliver Plunkett after witnessing its theft.
- Sean; also a runaway orphan who witnessed the theft of the head.
- The primate; stands to be greatly embarrassed by the loss of the head.
- Gary; friend of Eddie who fond of explosives and explosions in general.
- Scarface Cutler; violent criminal and holder of Plunkett's head.
- Ivan; blind son of Cutler.

== Development ==
The story was initially written in 1995-6 as a feature film script aimed at adults. It was sold in 1996 although, as of 2012, no further information has been released. When Bateman was attempting to write the sequel to Reservoir Pups, he found this script, "threw most of it out"; and re-aimed it at the young-adult audience.

== Reception ==
Though the book is especially good at getting inside the heads of boys to reveal the ambiguous motivations and dynamics of boy-boy interaction with its nuanced body language and subtle power plays, this is no touchy-feely psychological drama. Cinematic action, droll narration, and imaginative plotting guarantee wide and varied readerly appeal.

— The Bulletin of the Center for Children's Books

The novel received a positive reception from reviewers.

Kirkus Reviews called the novel a "fast-paced improbable adventure", stating that readers "will quickly warm to Eddie" and that it is "a good choice for reluctant readers"; although they do state that this is an easier read if you read Reservoir Pups beforehand. In a review aimed at younger readers, Kidzworld stated that "the worst part about Eddie's adventures is that Eddie and his friends basically spend the first half of the book getting beaten up and abused"; although this is somewhat mitigated as "it's fun to read about Eddie and his gang saving the day at last". They awarded the book a score of four out of five stars. Conan Tigard, writing for Reading Review, praised the novel’s pace, characters and believability, stating that he read the book in one sitting. Tigard comments that he found many references to the first book in the series, although did not think it necessary to read it first. In conclusion, he stated "overall, I thought that Bring Me the Head of Oliver Plunkett was an excellent story with fun and excitement that all readers will enjoy. Bravo, Colin Bateman. Way to go!" and awarded the novel a score of nine out of ten.

Cooper Renner, for the School Library Journal, praised the "marvelously over-the-top plot"; the "likable, down-to-earth main characters"; and stated that "plot-turns worthy of an adult thriller keep the pages turning, and Bateman's light touch keeps the violence from seeming as frightening as it otherwise might". Renner concluded by saying that this novel is "a first-rate achievement, and a truly comic novel with a plot that never lets up". Booklist stated that "there's nothing subtle here" and that there is much that is "specifically Irish and Catholic", however tempered this somewhat by stating that "readers already familiar with Eddie will enjoy Bateman's wry humor, nutty characters, and swift-moving plot".
