= St. Peter's Roman Catholic Church, Drogheda =

Saint Peter's Church
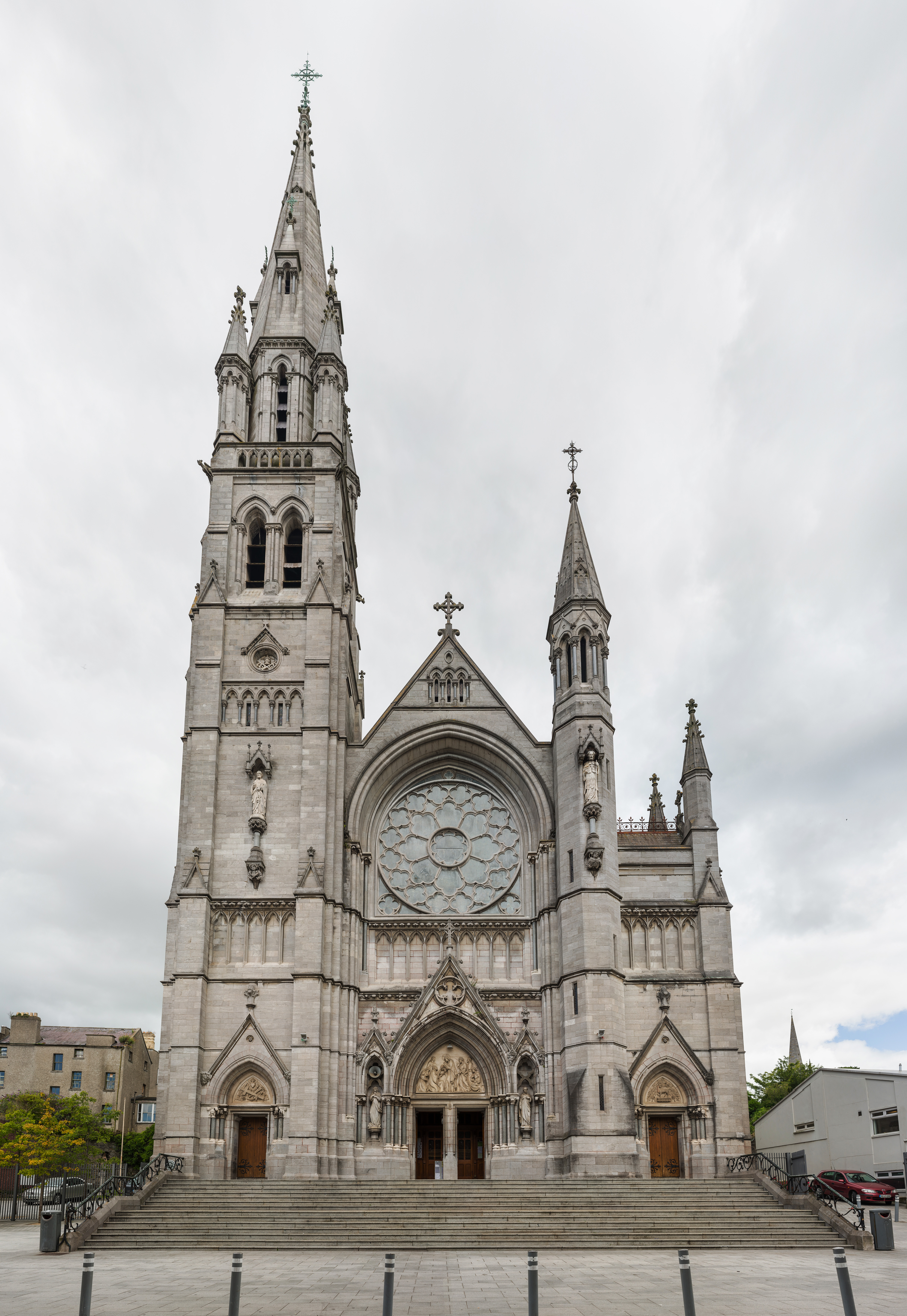
- View from West Street

- Location within Ireland
- 53.715184°N 6.352440°W
- Location: Drogheda
- Country: Ireland
- Denomination: Roman Catholic (Latin Rite)
- Website: https://www.saintpetersdrogheda.ie/

History
- Status: Active
- Founded: 1793

Architecture
- Functional status: Chapel of ease
- Architect(s): J. O'Neill and W.H. Byrne
- Style: French Gothic
- Completed: 1884

Specifications
- Length: 161 ft (49 m)
- Width: 101 ft (31 m)
- Height: 222 ft (68 m)

Administration
- Province: Armagh
- Diocese: Archdiocese of Armagh
- Parish: St Peter's, Drogheda

Clergy
- Bishop: Eamon Martin

St. Peter's Roman Catholic Church is located on West Street, Drogheda, County Louth, Ireland. Designed by John O'Neill and William Henry Byrne and built in the French Gothic style of local limestone ashlar in 1884. This Roman Catholic church is known for its tall west gable, rose window and for containing the national shrine of St. Oliver Plunkett.

== History ==
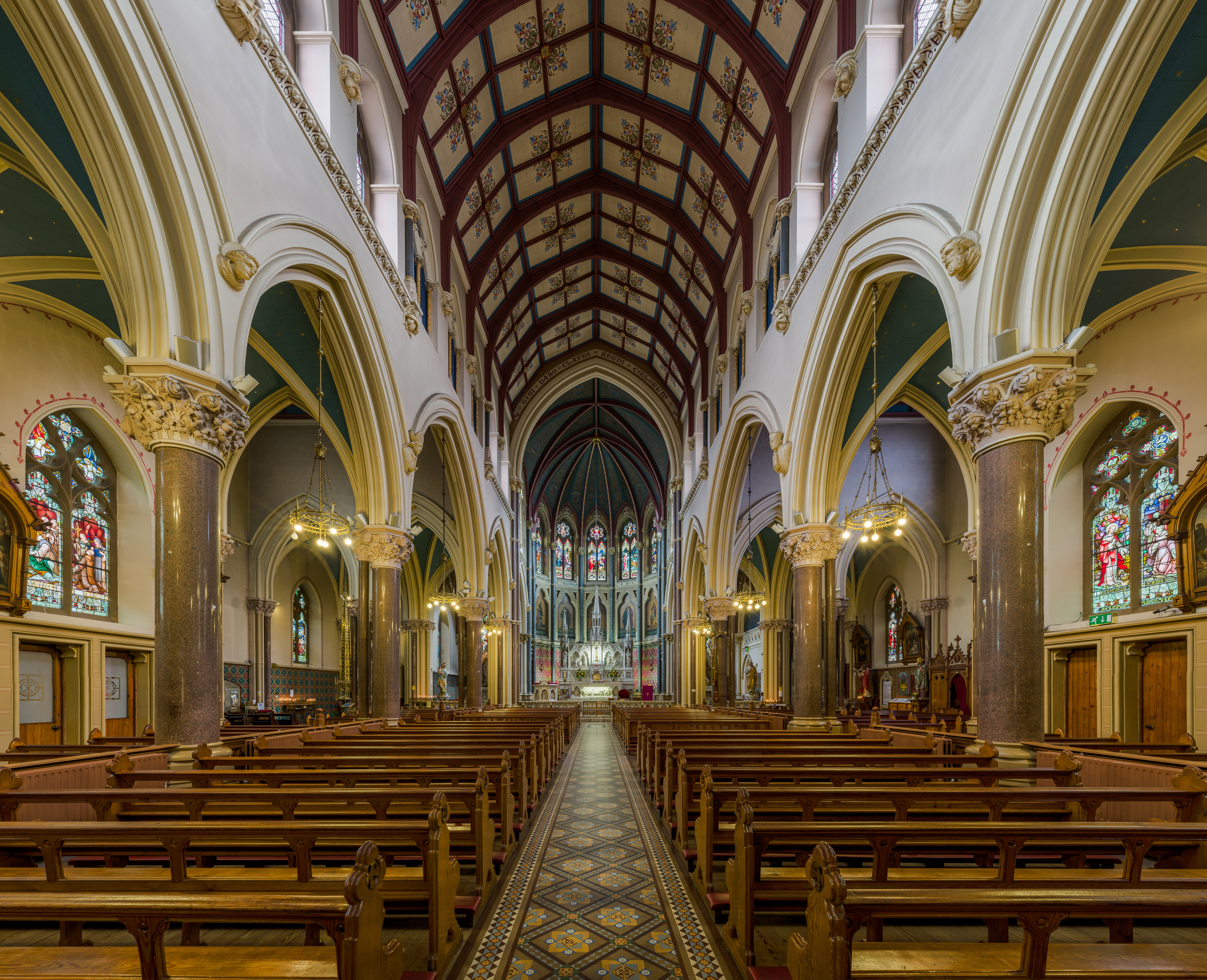
The view of the nave looking north to the altar

During the time of the Penal laws, Catholic chapels were barred within a town's walls. Therefore, Drogheda's Catholic chapel was outside the Westgate and was inadequate for the needs of the populace. A plot of land on a suitable site in West Street (Drogheda's main street) was persistently refused by the corporation. Eventually, through the influence of a Mr. Chester, who was a wealthy Catholic, a lease was finally secured.

A ceremony was held for all to witness Richard O'Reilly, Archbishop of Armagh and Primate of all-Ireland laying the foundation stone. Although the occasion was marred by an unseemly interruption, when the Mayor and Drogheda corporation arrived at the ceremony wearing their official regalia, with the Mace and Sword of state being borne before them, to confront the Archbishop. They warned him that a 'Popish Chapel' would not be tolerated within the town walls.

Sir Edward Bellew of Barmeath Castle, a Catholic, stepped forward and convinced the mayor and corporation and their fellow travelers to withdraw. The proceedings continued without further ado and the foundation stone was duly laid.

The first church on the site was completed in 1793 to a design by Francis Johnston (who designed the spire of the nearby Church of Ireland of the same name) to a cost in the region of £12,000.

== Present building ==
The façade of St. Peter's is an imposing structure in the French Gothic Revival style, built of local limestone. It is one of the most notable buildings on West Street in the town centre of Drogheda. The building from 1793 was partly incorporated into the present building. The tower of the church is very similar to that of St. Patrick's Church in Dungannon, County Tyrone. A detailed image of that building is held at the Highlanes Gallery, illustrated on a mid 19th Century (ca. 1861) map of the town created by Isaiah Rowland CE.

The Church is famous for housing the National Shrine to St. Oliver Plunkett, who was martyred at Tyburn in 1681. The shrine is most elaborate and contains the preserved head of the saint. Another showcase displays his shoulder blade and other bones as relics. Also on exhibit is the cell door of Newgate prison in which he spent his last days.

The Church is a prominent tourist attraction but signs urge silence and remind people that they are in a sacred place.

== Gallery ==
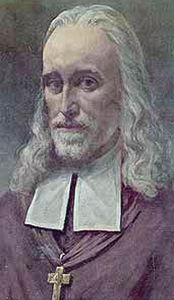
St. Peters houses the national shrine to Saint Oliver Plunkett

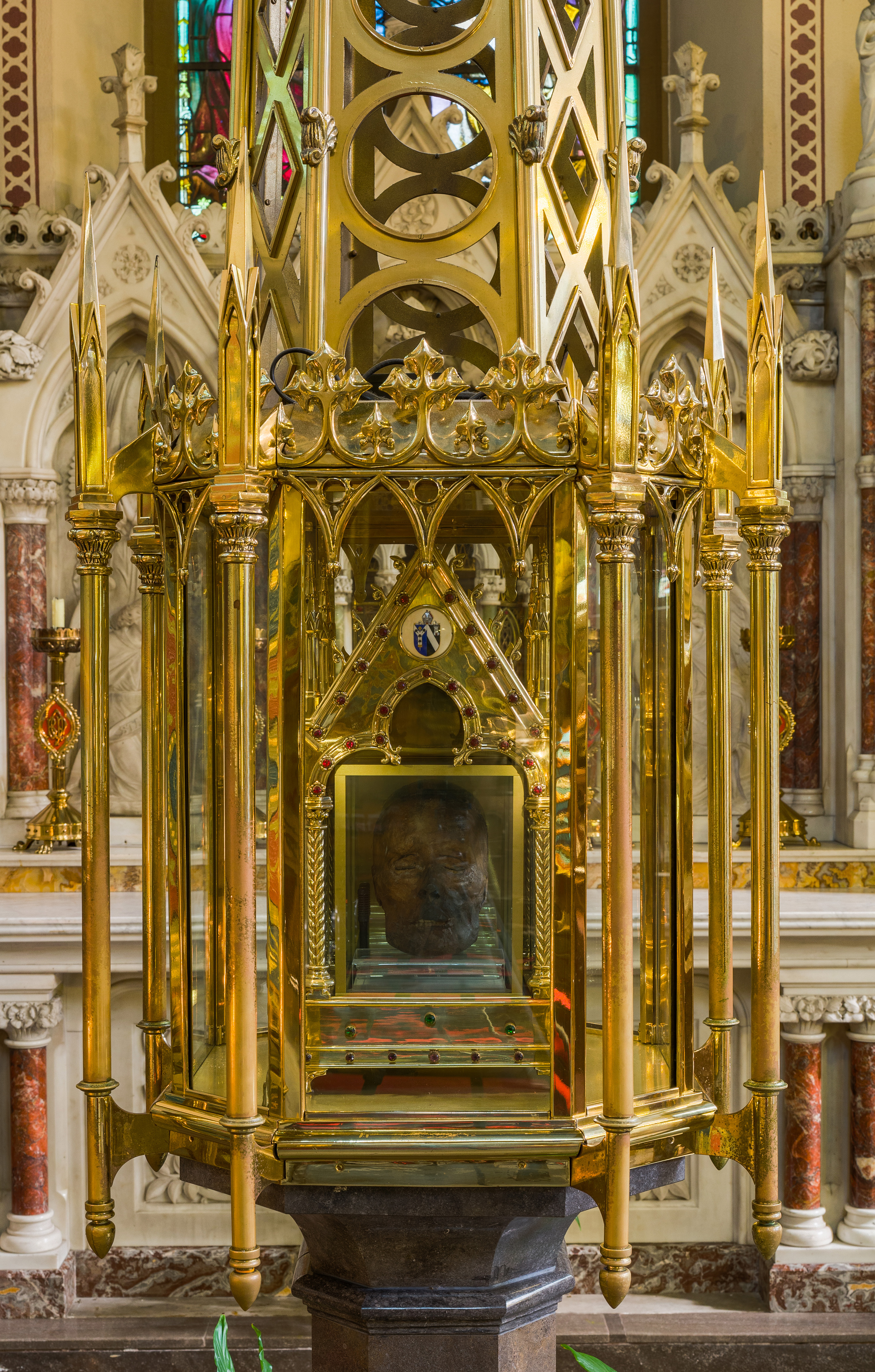
Shrine of Saint Oliver Plunkett up close, showing Plunkett's head.

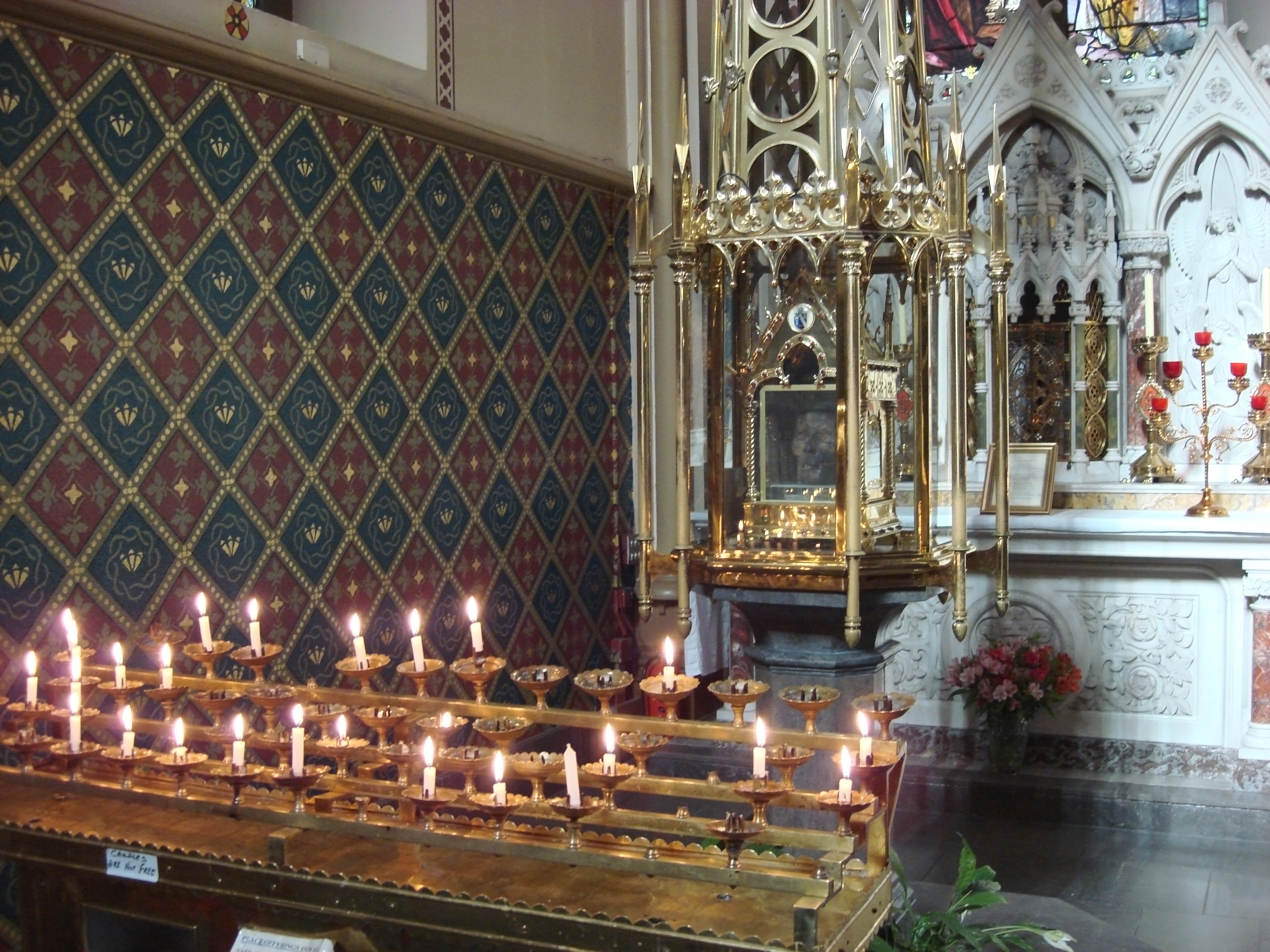
Shrine of Saint Oliver Plunkett.
