= John Bellew, 1st Baron Bellew of Duleek =

Irish Jacobite soldier and politician

A portrait by Garret Morphy, thought to be of Lord Bellew of Duleek

John Bellew, 1st Baron Bellew of Duleek (died 12 January 1692) was an Irish Jacobite soldier and politician.

== Biography ==
Bellew was the son of was son of Sir Christopher Bellew of Bellewstown and Frances Plunkett, a daughter of Matthew Plunkett, 7th Baron Louth. As a child he was sent to France for his safety during the Irish Rebellion of 1641, but he returned to Ireland in 1648 in the retinue of the Marquess of Ormonde, who gave him command of a troop of horse in the Royalist army. He was later appointed lieutenant of the ordnance in Ireland. He was present at the Battle of Rathmines during the Irish Confederate Wars. Bellew subsequently had his Irish estates, totalling 6,000 acres in County Louth and County Meath, seized by the Commonwealth of England under the Act for the Settlement of Ireland 1652. Bellew was transplanted to Connaught.

Upon the Stuart Restoration, Bellew was restored to his estates in October 1660 and was knighted in 1661. A Roman Catholic, he was made a member of the Privy Council of Ireland in 1685 and on 29 October 1686 he was created Baron Bellew of Duleek by James II of England. Bellew attended the Irish House of Lords during James II's short-lived Patriot Parliament in 1689. He raised a regiment of infantry for the Jacobite army during the Williamite War in Ireland. In April 1691 he was attainted by the Williamite regime. He fought at the Battle of Aughrim in July 1691, at which he was severely wounded and taken prisoner. Bellew died of his wounds in captivity in England the following year in January 1692. He was buried in St. Mary's Abbey, Duleek.

On 28 November 1663, Bellew had married Mary (or Margaret) Bermingham. He was succeeded in his title by his eldest son, Walter, although due to the attainder, Walter's title was not recognised outside Jacobite circles. After Walter's death in 1694, the attainder was reversed on 30 March 1697 for Richard Bellew.

Peerage of Ireland
New creation	Baron Bellew of Duleek; 1686–1691	Succeeded by Attainted; Claimed by Walter Bellew
