= Reservoir Pups =

2003 young adult novel by Colin Bateman

- Author: Colin Bateman
- Language: English
- Series: Eddie & the Gang with No Name
- Genre: Crime, young adult
- Publisher: Hodder Children's
- Publication date: 13 November 2003
- Publication place: United Kingdom
- Media type: Print (hardcover and softcover)
- Pages: 312
- ISBN: 9780340877807
- OCLC: 52921494
- Followed by: Bring Me the Head of Oliver Plunkett (2004)

Reservoir Pups (also known as Running with the Reservoir Pups) is the first novel of the Eddie & the Gang with No Name trilogy by Northern Irish author, Colin Bateman, published on 13 November 2003 through Hodder Children's Books. It is Bateman's first young adult novel.

== Plot ==
The story surrounds a twelve-year-old named Eddie and his affiliation with a local gang, known as the "Reservoir Pups".

Eddie's father leaves his mother to run away with her boss, a doctor. His mother finds herself a new nursing job at the Royal Victoria Maternity Hospital, however it's located in a run-down section of Belfast; the pair move there regardless. A short time after they arrive, Scuttles, the chief of hospital security, accuses Eddie of scamming the locals and of being part of a neighbourhood gang, the "Reservoir Pups", for which his mum scolds him also.

Given that all the people in his life believe he is already part of the gang, Eddie decides to join. He is tasked with stealing the security codes from Scuttles' computer and while attempting to do so, hears of a plot to kidnap twelve babies from the hospital nursery, abandoning his mission. Returning to the gang, Eddie is ostracised for his failure to complete his task and he is told to "watch his back". Eddie then sets out to foil the kidnapping himself.

== Characters ==
- Eddie Malone; twelve-year-old boy, protagonist of the story.
- Bernard Scuttles; chief of hospital security and boyfriend of Eddies mum.
- Captain Black; paraplegic boy and leader of the gang.
- Alison Beech; owner of the cosmetics company that is attempting to kidnap the babies.

== Reception ==
Colin Bateman presents an exhilarative, spine tingling work filled with all the zestful agitation, whimsical cast of characters and explosive tension necessary to hold the target audience absorbed from beginning paragraph to ending lines.

— Molly Martin

The novel was well received, with reviewers praising the pace of the novel and the complex themes discussed throughout.

Publishers Weekly called the novel a "rippingly paced", "zany caper cloaked in the droll, dark comedy that marks [Bateman's] adult fiction", praising the "cleverly convoluted plot"; and concluding that "how all the strands come together in this innovative, far-fetched tale makes for great entertainment, and Bateman's appealing young hero is entirely credible". Candice Cooper, writing for Kaboose, called the novel a "fun, witty, tale of a 12 year-old boy with a gigantic amount of integrity and ambition", commenting that "it's important for him to do the right thing and he works very hard to accomplish it". She does go on to comment, however, that the "gang aspect of the book is a bit disturbing at times", finding that to perhaps be inappropriate for a book aimed at this audience. Cooper awarded the novel a score of four out of five. Kirkus Reviews found that the "fast-paced plot gradually moves the reader from recognizable reality into a neverland of impossible characters and larger-than-life evildoers", concluding that "for the lovers of nonstop action and understated British humor, this will be a satisfying page-turner. Unpretentiously unpredictable". Children's book reviewer, Inis Magazine, found that "in this mixture between 'problem novel' ... and Dahlesque novel of the grotesque, with a humanised version of 101 Dalmatians thrown in for good measure, Bateman creates a strange juxtaposition of pathos, comedy and shocking grotesquerie". Reviewer Amanda Piesse also commented on the "swift pace" and "hyperbolic tone" throughout; in conclusion finding it to be "highly thought-provoking in terms of both form and content, this book had me re-reading it the moment I'd finished it". BookPage reviewer Alice Cary commented on the negative connection people may make with the subject matter for this novel, stating "between the witty word-smithing of Irish novelist Colin Bateman and the engaging voice of his protagonist, Eddie, readers are in good hands". Cary continues to state that while many elements of the novels plot could be considered unrealistic, "Eddie's narration makes it riveting and funny, and the story always rings true".

=== Controversy ===
The descriptions of "Mo", a young albino girl, caused controversy for Bateman at a school in Ballymena, Northern Ireland.
