= Richard Bellew, 3rd Baron Bellew of Duleek =

Irish peer, soldier and politician (died 1715)

Richard Bellew
- 3rd Baron Bellew of Duleek

Baron Bellew of Duleek
- Reign: 1694–1715
- Predecessor: Walter Bellew
- Successor: John Bellew
- Born: c. 1671
- Died: 22 March 1715 (aged 44)
- Burial: St. Mary's Abbey, Duleek
- Spouse: Lady Frances Brudenell
- Issue: John Bellew, Dorothea Bellew
- Father: John Bellew, 1st Baron Bellew of Duleek
- Mother: Mary Bermingham
- Religion: Initially Roman Catholic, later conformed to the Church of England

Richard Bellew, 3rd Baron Bellew of Duleek (c.1671 – 22 March 1715) was an Irish soldier, peer and politician.

== Biography ==
Bellew was the second son of John Bellew, 1st Baron Bellew of Duleek and Mary Bermingham. He joined his father as a supporter of James II during the Williamite War in Ireland, serving as a captain and later a colonel in the Jacobite dragoon regiment of Lord Dongan. He was outlawed under the Articles of Limerick and in 1691 he joined in the Flight of the Wild Geese to France, serving briefly in the French Royal Army. While in France, he had a disagreement with Brigadier Maxwell and decided to return to Ireland.

In 1694, Bellew succeeded his older brother, Walter, as Baron Bellew of Duleek and began attempting to have his outlawry reversed. With support from influential figures, including the Duke of Shrewsbury, Bellew was granted a pardon by William III of England on 18 March 1697. On 24 June 1698, Bellew was given leave to remain in England, but it took a further year before he regained his estates. The costs of obtaining his own and his father's posthumous pardon, the encumbrances on the estate, and the many claims outstanding against both himself and his father, left him heavily in debt.

In 1705, Bellew became a Protestant by conforming to the established Church of England and he was summoned to attend the Irish House of Lords in 1707. In January 1709, he contested a by-election for the Steyning constituency in the House of Commons of Great Britain on the interest of his brother-in-law, Charles Lennox, 1st Duke of Richmond. A double return was made, and on 15 February 1709, the House decided that Bellew's opponent had won the seat. He contested the seat for a second time at a by-election in February 1712 and was successful but was unseated in May 1712 after an investigation found evidence of bribery and the election was declared void. At this stage, he was identified as a high Tory, but by 1714 was considered a Whig in the Irish parliament. On 13 October 1713, he was awarded a pension of £300 per year by Anne, Queen of Great Britain. He died in 1715 and was buried at St. Mary's Abbey, Duleek.

In July 1695, he married Lady Frances Brudenell, daughter of Francis Brudenell, Lord Brudenell and the widow of Charles Livingston, 2nd Earl of Newburgh. Upon Bellew's death, his title was inherited by his son, John. Bellew's daughter, Dorothea, married Gustavus Hamilton.

Parliament of Great Britain
Preceded by William Wallis; Sir Henry Goring, Bt	Member of Parliament for Steyning; 1712; With: Sir Henry Goring, Bt	Succeeded by Robert Leeves; Sir Henry Goring, Bt
Peerage of Ireland
Preceded by Walter Bellew	Baron Bellew of Duleek; 1694–1715	Succeeded by John Bellew
