= St. Peter's Church of Ireland, Drogheda =

St Peter's Church
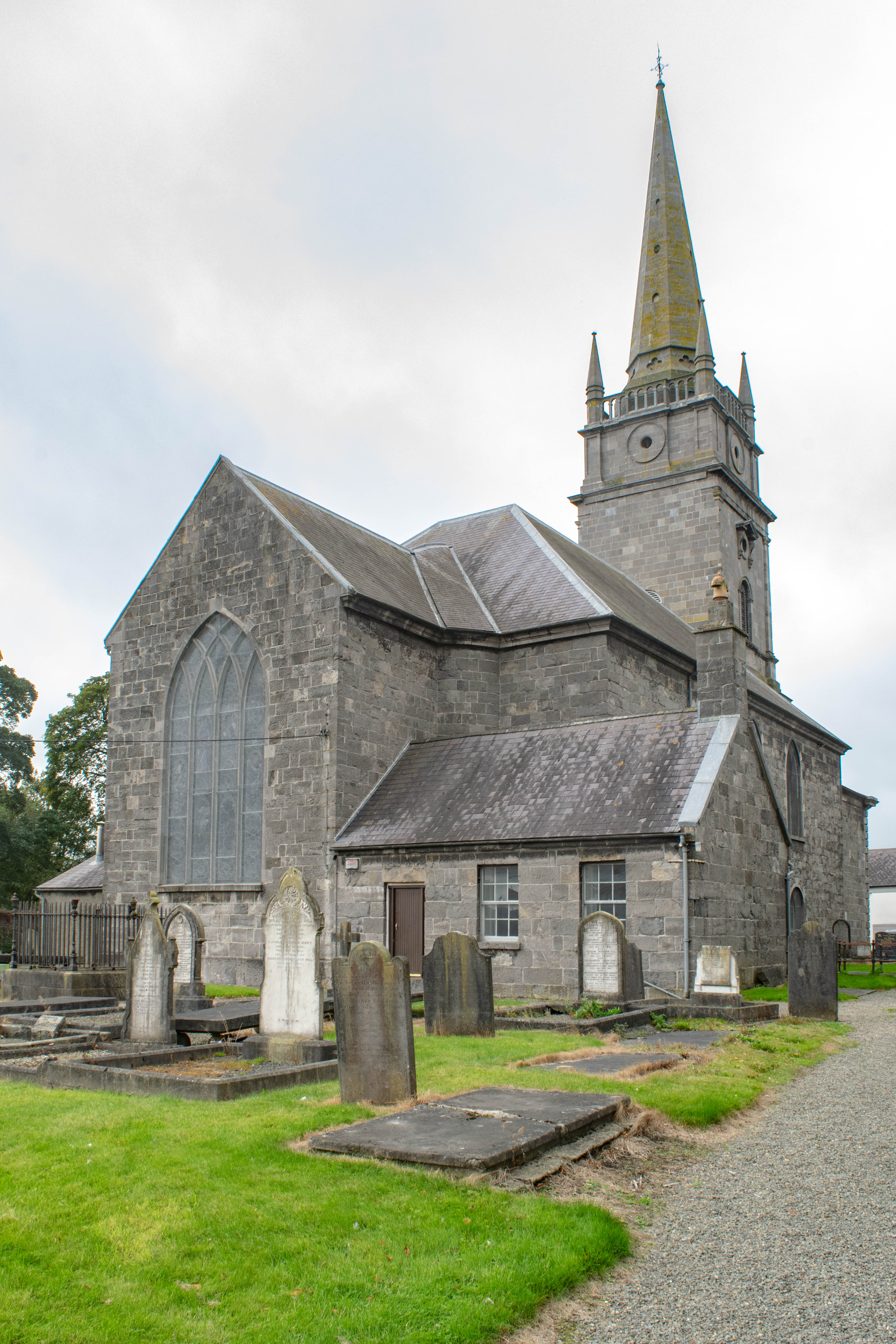
- St Peter's Church
- St Peter's Church
- 53.7153°N 6.3546°W
- Location: Peter's Hill, Drogheda, County Louth
- Country: Ireland
- Denomination: Church of Ireland
- Churchmanship: Broad Church

History
- Status: Parish church
- Consecrated: 1753

Architecture
- Functional status: Active
- Architect(s): Hugh Darley (1748); Francis Johnston (1785 - spire)
- Style: Georgian, Baroque
- Completed: 1793

Administration
- Province: Armagh
- Diocese: Armagh
- Parish: Drogheda and Kilsaran

Clergy
- Rector: Revd. Brian O’Reilly

St. Peter's Church of Ireland is an Anglican (Episcopalian) church located in Drogheda, Ireland, in the Diocese of Armagh. Designed in the Georgian style, St. Peter's starkly contrasts with the Neo-Gothic Roman Catholic church of the same name, located in the town centre.

== History ==
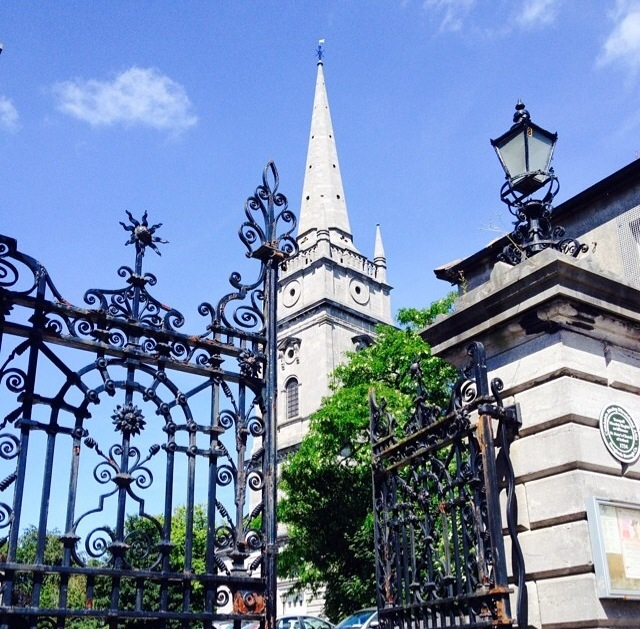
Baroque exterior showing gates made by Webb of Belfast

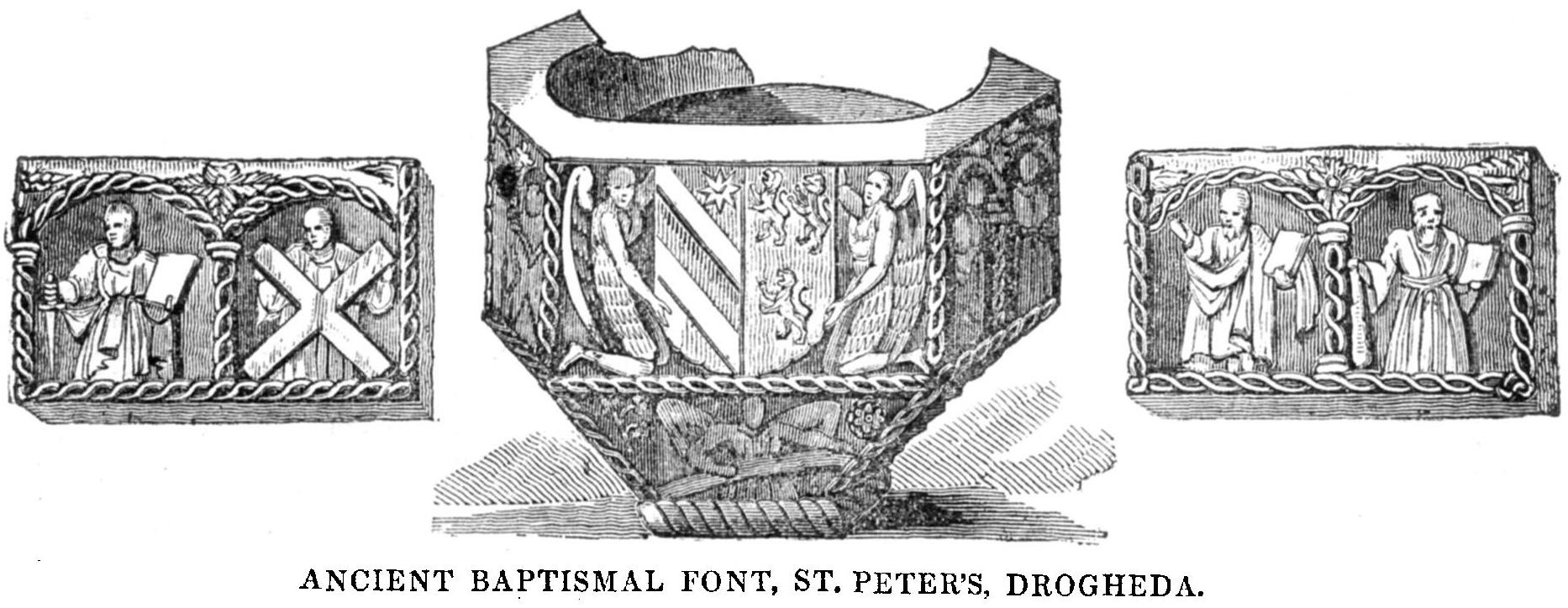
The Apostle Font

Saint Peter's Church of Ireland stands on a site that has been a centre of Christian worship for over 800 years. The church was established on the north side of the River Boyne also before 1186 and was given by Hugh de Lacy to the Augustinian canons of Llanthony Prima in Monmouthshire, Wales. There are the remains of much older buildings in the church grounds possibly dating as far back as the thirteenth century. Traces of old tiles found in the churchyard are similar to those at Mellifont Abbey.

The new church, which replaced a larger Gothic building on the same site, was opened in 1753, and was designed by the Dublin-based architect, Hugh Darley. The uppermost (fourth) stage of the spire is thought to have been designed by Francis Johnston, and was added in 1793.

The present interior of the Church is largely the result of a major reordering in the late 19th century. The original box pews were removed and the present rows of pews installed in their place. The sanctuary area was reordered in 1907 and the present pulpit and prayer desk installed circa 1909. The organ, for which the Corporation of Drogheda gave £300 in 1771, was built for the Church by John Snetzler in London.

Five great bells were hung in the old church, and these were severely damaged or destroyed by Cromwell's forces. The new Georgian church had one bell until 1791, when a peal of eight bells was cast by John Rudhall and hung for change ringing. Save for the tenor bell being recast in 1889 by John Taylor & Co (as the Rudhall foundry had closed in 1835), the original bells remain, and are rung twice a week.

After an arson attack on the church in 1999 there was a huge restoration project which provided new buildings to the church.

== Churchyard ==
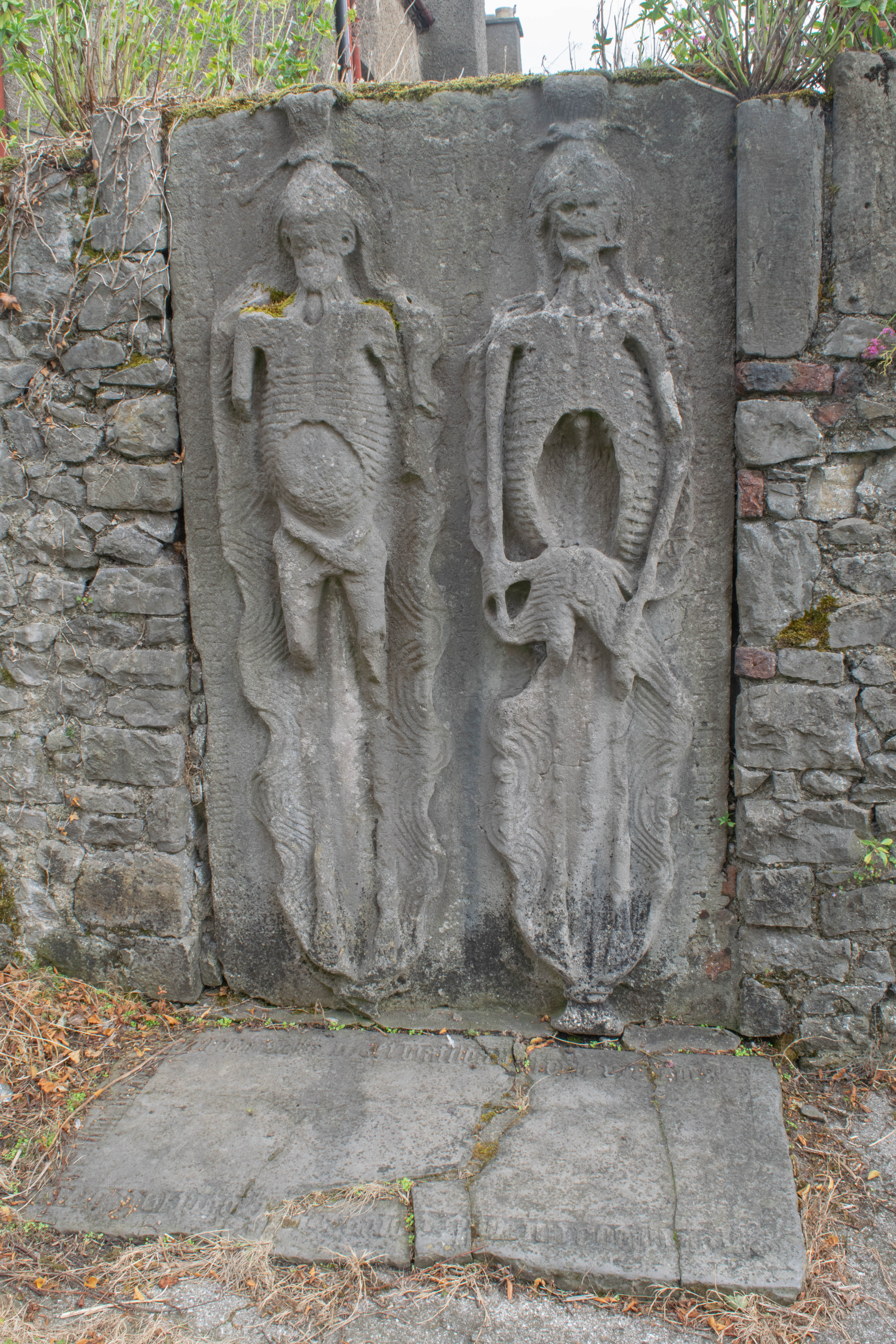
Cadaver stone of Sir Edmond Goldyng, Drogheda

Within the churchyard of St. Peter’s can be found many interesting and varied funerary monuments. Of these, perhaps the most interesting and visited is a "cadaver stone" taken from the tomb of Sir Edmond Goldyng and his wife Elizabeth Fleming. It is built into the churchyard wall, east of the present building and shows two cadavers enclosed in shrouds which have been partially opened to show the remains of the occupants of the tomb.

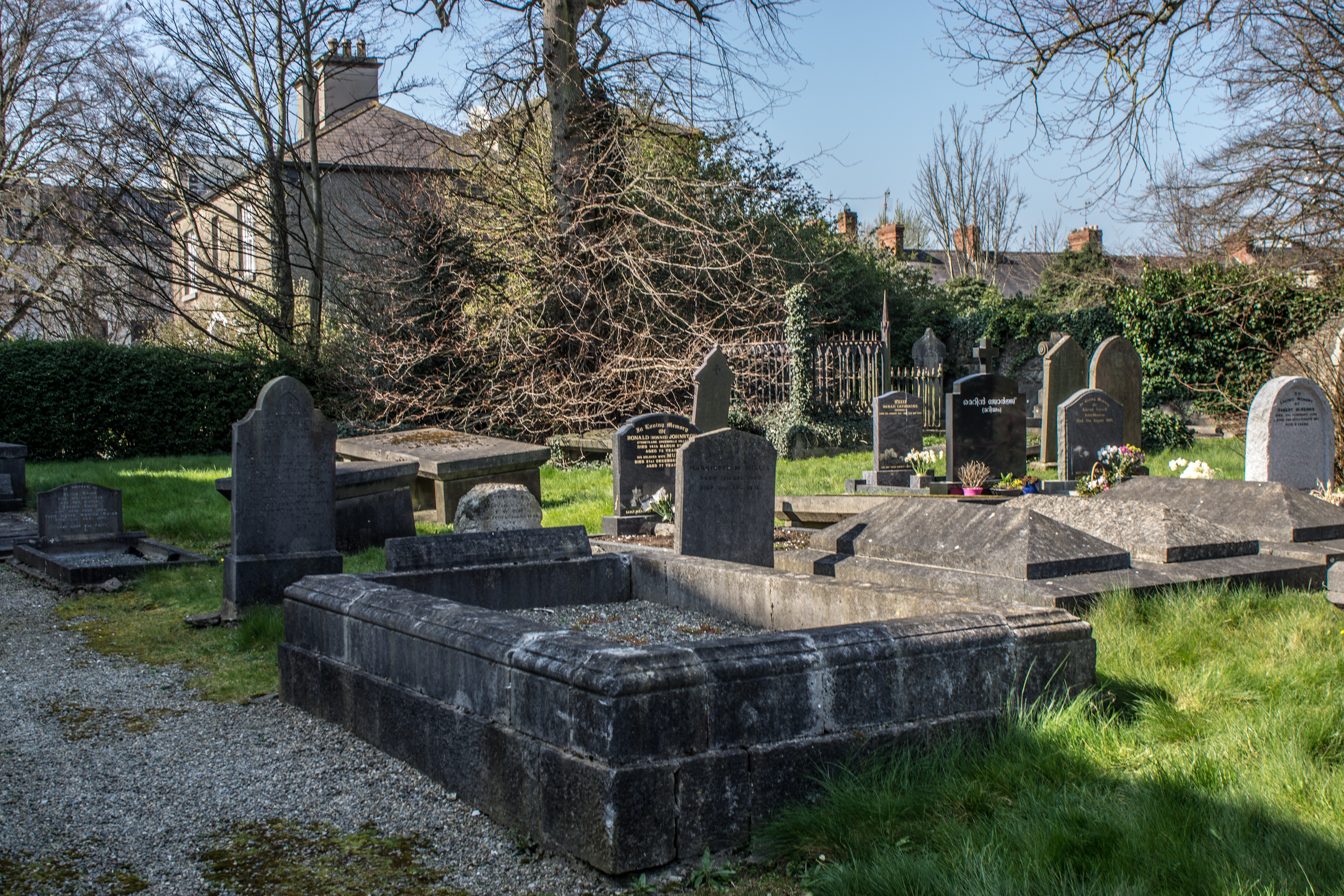
View of the Cemetery

Helen M. Roe in the Journal of the Royal Society of Antiquaries of Ireland, 1969 estimates that a date for the tomb would seem to fall within the first quarter of the 16th century. This type of tombstone is part of a fashion widespread in Europe, although relatively rare in Ireland, which explored bodily decomposition and human mortality. This reflected a preoccupation with death arising from the great plague of 1347 to 1350, and subsequent epidemics.
