= St. Mary's Abbey, Duleek =

Monastery in Ireland

- Mainistir Mhuire
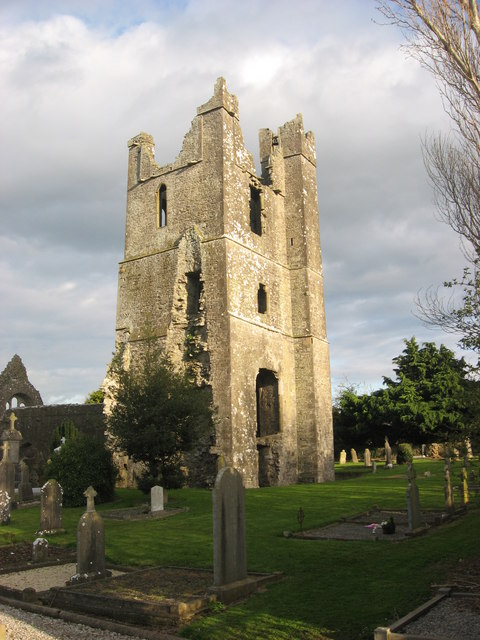
- Tower, 15th century

- Location within Ireland

Monastery information
- Order: Canons Regular (Arrouaisian)
- Established: 1180
- Disestablished: 1537
- Mother house: Clonard Abbey
- Dedication: Mary, mother of Jesus
- Diocese: Meath

People
- Founder: Hugh de Lacy, Lord of Meath

Architecture
- Status: Inactive
- Heritage designation

National monument of Ireland
- Official name: Duleek Church
- Reference no.: 179
- Style: Norman

Site
- Location: Commons, Duleek, County Meath, Ireland
- Coordinates: 53.655069°N 6.418806°W
- Public access: yes

St. Mary's Abbey is a medieval monastery and national monument located in Duleek, County Meath in Ireland.

== Location ==
St. Mary's Abbey is located in the central part of Duleek called the Commons, between Main Street and Church Lane. The River Nanny is to the southwest.

== History ==
A monastery stood in Duleek from the 5th century. A round tower stood here; it was damaged by lightning in 1147 but survived a few more centuries.

In 1180 Hugh de Lacy, Lord of Meath granted Duleek (including St. Patrick's Church) to the Canons Regular. However, the surviving buildings are later: the southern arcade is 13th century, the southern aisle and bell tower are 15th century and the main tower and the east gable with window are 16th century. The abbey was shut down in the 1537 Dissolution of the Monasteries.

The Abbey was later used for burials. James Cusack, Catholic Bishop of Meath 1679–88, was buried in an effigial tomb. Also buried here is John Bellew, 1st Baron Bellew of Duleek who died of wounds received at the Battle of Aughrim, and his second son, Richard Bellew, 3rd Baron Bellew of Duleek. Saint Kienan's, a Church of Ireland church, was built next to the old abbey in 1816.

== Buildings ==
All that remains is the south aisle and the tower. The tower survives with four stories with quoins, battered walls, battlements, aumbry and stairs turret. The east window (bearing the arms of Sir John Bellew and Dame Ismay Nugent beneath it) is a 1587 post-Gothic replacement.

In the north wall of the medieval belfry is the scar or shadow of a round tower.
