= Richard A. Ballou =

American politician

Member of the New Hampshire House of Representatives from the Belknap 5th district
- In office 1988–1990

Personal details
- Party: Republican

Richard A. Ballou is an American politician. A member of the Republican Party, he served in the New Hampshire House of Representatives from 1988 to 1990.
