= Esther Ballou =

American classical composer (1915–1973)

Esther Williamson Ballou (17 July 1915 – 12 March 1973) was an American composer, music educator, organist, pianist, and accompanist. She was born in Elmira, New York, and died in Chichester, England.

== Career ==
Ballou began piano lessons at 4 years old, organ lessons at age 13, and began composing in her twenties. At 14, she performed a piano concerto with the Elmira Symphony Orchestra, and two years prior won first prize through the state of New York for her piano playing.

She graduated from Bennington College in 1937 with a Bachelor of Arts, Mills College in 1938 with a Master of Arts, and The Juilliard School of Music in 1943 for a graduate fellowship. At Bennington, located in Vermont, she took composition lessons with Otto Luening. At Juilliard, located in New York City, she studied composition with Bernard Wagenaar and privately from Wallingford Riegger.

During her time at Bennington College, Ballou fostered a musical interest in Modern Dance and Ballet, and began composing music. While a student there, she composed two ballets, Earth Sage for Louise Kloepper, and Lysistrata for José Limón. Until 1942, she toured the United States with multiple dance troupes as an accompanist and composer, including for Marion Van Tuyl's dance group. She won fellowships to the MacDowell Colony in 1944, 1945, 1954, and 1955. She also participated in the Middlebury Composer's Conference and the Bennington Composer's Conference as a member of the composer's staff.

Ballou taught at the Juilliard School from 1943–50, at Catholic University from 1951–54, and at American University from 1955–72. Her performing career as an organist was shortened by arthritis.

In 1963, her Capriccio for Violin and Piano was the first work by an American woman composer to premiere at the White House.

Ballou describes her music as ‘tending towards classicism in that it stresses clarity of design and directness of expression’.

The American University's Library Archives hold the Esther Williamson Ballou Papers, which is an archive that "consist of [her] audiotapes, biographical materials, correspondence (1935-1980), writings and compositions (1936-1972), photographs, programs, and teaching materials." There are also photocopies of several of her manuscripts at the New York Public Library Archives.

== Family ==
After completing her education, she married Harold Ballou in August 1950 and moved to Washington, DC. Her parents were E. Duff and Marbury Clark Williamson.

== Works ==
Ballou composed orchestra, chamber, organ, piano and vocal music. Several of her works were published by ACA. Pieces listed as "Completed Scores and Parts, Sketches" in the Esther Williamson Ballou Papers include:

- Nocturne, 1937
- Adagio for Bassoon and String Orchestra, 1962
- Allegro for String Quartet
- The Art of the Fugue, 1963
- A Babe is Born, 1959
- Bag of Tricks, 1956
- The Beatitudes, 1963
- Beguine, 1960
- Beguine for Two Pianos, 1958
- Berceuse for Piano Forte, 1956
- Blues, 1944
- Brass Sextette with Piano Forte, 1962
- Bride, 1963
- Capriccio for Violin and Piano, 1963
- Christmas Mass (Palestrina)
- Chromatic Invention
- Concerto for Guitar and Orchestra, 1964
- Concerto for Piano and Orchestra, 1964
- Concerto for Piano and Orchestra, 1965
- Concerto for Piano and Orchestra, 1964
- Concerto for Viola and Orchestra, 196-
- Dance Suite for Piano, 1956
- Dance Suite for Piano, 1960
- Dialogues for Oboe and Guitar, 1966
- Dialogues for Oboe and Guitar, 1967
- Discussion of Maan
- Divertimento for String Quartet, 1958
- Early American Portrait, 1962
- Early American Portrait 1962
- Early American Portrait 1964
- Early American Portrait, Wild Geese, 1964
- Elegy for Cello Solo, 1969
- Fantasia Brevis for Oboe and Strings, 1952
- Fantasia Brevis II, 1952
- For Art Nagle on His Birthday January 30, 1968
- Forty Finger Beguine, 1952
- Four Hand Suite September, 1957
- Fugue from the Score for an Educational Animated Film
- Haiku, 1968
- Hear Us!, 1968
- I Will Lift Up Mine Eyes, 1965
- If Truth in Hearts that Perish, 1937
- Impertinence for Clarinet and Two Pianos, 1936
- Impromptu for Organ, 1968
- In Memoriam, 1960
- In Memoriam 1962
- Intermezzo for Orchestra, 1943
- Jazz Theme and Variations, 1936
- Konzertstuck, 1972
- Let-Down, 1937
- Look Not in My Eyes, 1937
- Loveliest of Trees, 1937
- The Masque of the Red Death
- May the Words, 1967
- Merely a Beginning, 1937
- Minutiae for Flute and Piano, 1953
- Un Morceau d’Ensable sur le Nom d’Elmira, 1972
- Music for the Theatre, 1952
- Nocturne for String Quartet
- O the Sun Come Up-Up-Up in the Opening, 1966
- Oboe Concertino, 1953
- Passacaglia and Toccata, 1962
- A Passing Word, 1960
- A Plaintive Note, 1952
- Pocahontas- Incomplete Opera (Orchestration by Esther Williamson Ballou)
- Pop Goes the Weasel, 1943
- Portrait I, 1968
- Prelude I for Piano, 1960
- Prelude 1, 2, and 3 for Piano, 1939
- Prelude and Allegro for String Orchestra and Piano, 1949
- Prelude and Allegro for String Orchestra and Piano, 1952
- Prelude and Allegro for String Orchestra and Piano, 1959
- Prelude and Gigue, 1948
- Pride, Envy, Sloth, Lust, Anger, 1960
- Prism for String Trio, 1969
- Quest for the Dance, 1960
- Romanza, 1969
- Rondino for Harpsichord, 1961
- Rumba on Riverside Drive
- The Sandbox (Orchestra by Esther Williamson Ballou)
- The Sea in Maine
- The Shepherd, 1944
- Sonata for Piano, 1955
- Sonata for Piano, 1959
- Sonata for Two Pianos, 1949
- Sonata for Two Pianos, 1959
- Sonata No. 2 for 2 Pianos, 1959
- Sonata for Violin and Pianoforte, 1937
- Sonatina, 1941
- Sonatina No. 2, 1967
- A Song, 1938
- A Song, 1949
- Street Scenes, 1960
- Suite for Chamber Orchestra, 1939
- Suite for Guitar and Chamber Orchestra
- Suite for Cello and Piano
- Suite for Winds, 1956
- Suite for Winds, 1957
- A Telephone Number
- Themes and Variations on Shenandoah Alma Mater, 1959
- Time, 1937
- Trial Run, 1969
- Trio for Violin, Cello, and Piano, 1958
- Trio for Violin, Cello, and Pianoforte, 1956
- The Trumpet Blues, 1946
- Up to the Silence, 1968
- Variation for Gail, 1964
- Variations, Scherzo, and Fugue on a Theme by Lou Harrison, 1959
- Violin Sonatina, 1959
- War Lyrics: Bacchanal, Blues Duet, Norse Duet, 1940
- What if a Much of a Which of a Wind, 1959
- Whip-Pour-Will
- Wind Quintette, 1953

Analyses:

- Sonata for Piano
  - For a full analysis of this piece, see Richard Donald Ringenwald's master's thesis
- Suite for Winds, 1957
  - For a full analysis of this piece, see Tyler J. Kimball's master's thesis
  - Dance Suite, 1936-1937

She published a textbook:

- Creative Explorations of Musical Elements (1971)
