= Michael Ballou =

American artist

- In a 2013 interview
- Born: 1952 (age 73–74); St. Louis, Missouri, US
- Occupation: Artist

Michael Ballou (born 1952) is an American artist. His work has been exhibited in New York City as well as nationally and internationally. His work includes sculpture, mixed media, film, video, and installation. In 1993, he started the Four Walls Slide and Film Club, an informal monthly venue for time-based works.

== Biography ==
Michael Ballou was born in St. Louis in 1952.

As of 2013, he was based in Williamsburg, Brooklyn.
