= Henry O'Keane =

Irish Catholic priest and French Army officer

Henry O'Keane (3 February 1763 – 6 July 1817) was an Irish catholic priest and French army officer.

O'Keane was born at Kilcummin, Killala, County Mayo, one of at least three sons to a cowherd on the Tyrawley estate. He learned Latin at a hedge school and was ordained for the diocese of Killala. He went to France where he studied philosophy and theology at the Irish College in Nantes. He stayed in France, and at the time of the French Revolution was a curé near the town. He took the constitutional oath of the clergy in 1791, joining the French army around that time.

O'Keane became a captain in the 65th regiment, and a member of the staff of Jean Joseph Amable Humbert, for whom he served as a local liaison when the French landed at Killala on 22 August 1798 (he spoke Irish and French better than English).

Church of Ireland Bishop Joseph Stock praised his actions during the rebellion, stating that "his language breathed nothing but mildness and liberality, and indeed his behaviour was suitable, for he exerted himself on all occasions to protect the loyalists and frequently with the greatest effect."

He remained at Ballina after Humbert left for Castlebar, and in the aftermath of the defeat at Ballinamuck, he and Peter Barrett led an unsuccessful attack on Castlebar on 12 September. On 22 September they engaged a British force from Sligo attempting to take Ballina. The Franco-Irish retreated to Killala, where after heavy fighting, they dispersed or surrendered on 23 September.

O'Keane surrendered and was tried for high treason as a British military subject at Castlebar. He was convicted and sentenced to transportation, later commuted to banishment. Bishop Stock gave evidence in his favour.

He returned to France, apparently having "carried off from Dublin another man's wife", serving in Germany and Portugal. He was one of the first to be admitted, on 1 October 1807, to the Legion d'Honneur. Following the restoration of the Bourbons, he retired. He died unmarried on rue Traversière in the town of Auxerre in 1817.
