= Oliver Plunkett =

Irish Catholic archbishop and saint (1625–1681)

Saint Oliver Plunkett
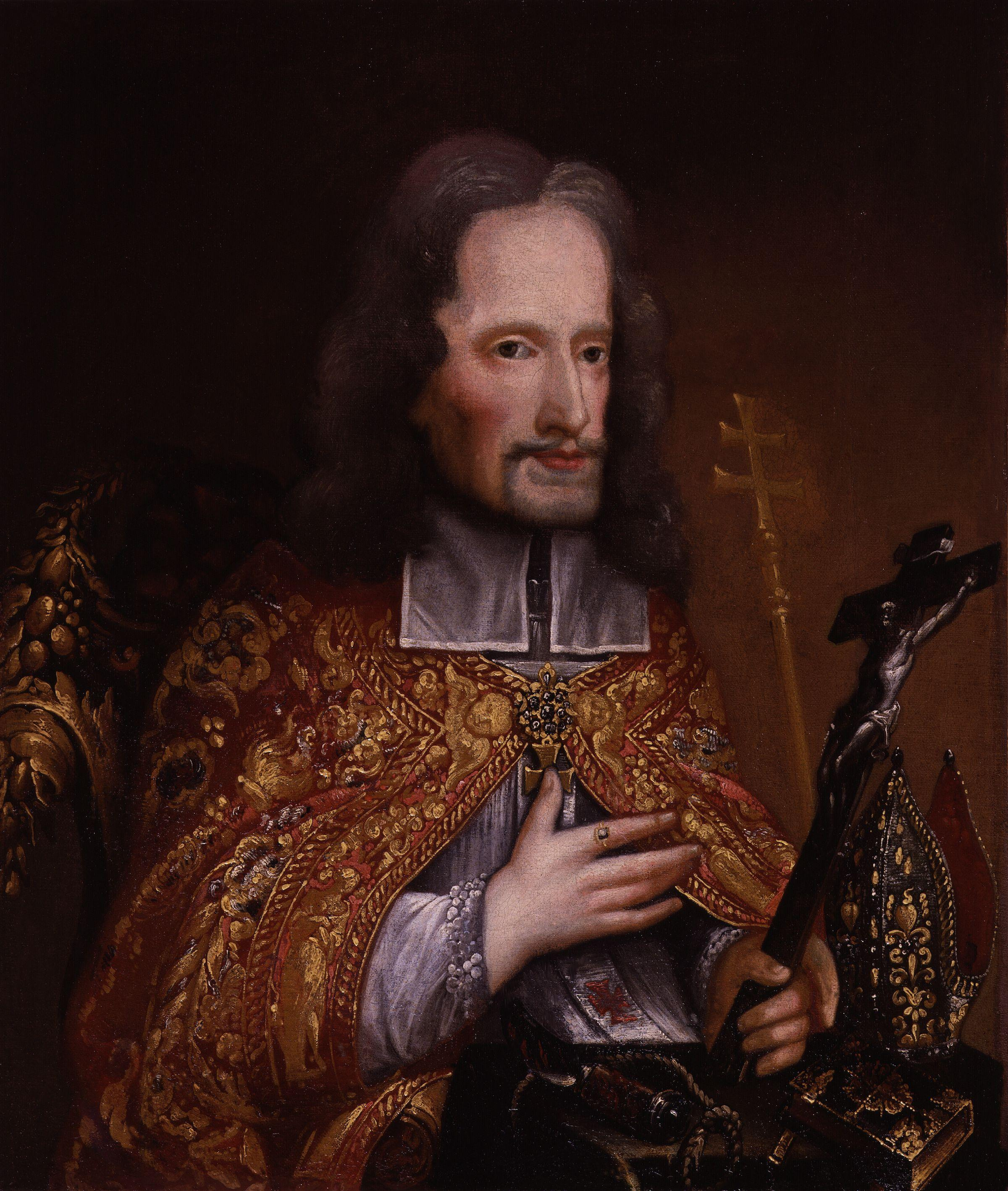
- Portrait by Edward Luttrell

Martyr, Archbishop and Primate of All Ireland
- Born: 1 November 1625; Loughcrew, County Meath, Ireland
- Died: 1 July 1681 (aged 55); Tyburn, London, England
- Venerated in: Catholic Church
- Beatified: 23 May 1920, Rome, Italy by Pope Benedict XV
- Canonized: 12 October 1975, Rome, Vatican City by Pope Paul VI
- Major shrine: Downside Abbey; St. Peter's Roman Catholic Church, Drogheda, Ireland
- Feast: 1 July
- Patronage: Peace and reconciliation in Ireland

Oliver Plunkett, also spelled Plunket Irish: Oilibhéar Pluincéid; 1 November 1625 – 1 July 1681), was the Catholic Archbishop of Armagh and Primate of All Ireland and the last victim of the Popish Plot. He was beatified in 1920 and canonised in 1975, thus becoming the first new Irish saint in almost seven hundred years.

== Biography ==
Oliver Plunkett was born on 1 November 1625 (earlier biographers gave his date of birth as 1 November 1629, but 1625 has been the consensus since the 1930s) in Loughcrew, County Meath, Ireland, to well-to-do parents with Hiberno-Norman ancestors. A grandson of James Plunkett, 7th Baron Killeen (died 1595), he was related by birth to a number of landed families, such as the recently ennobled Earls of Roscommon, as well as the long-established Earls of Fingall, Lords Louth, and Lords Dunsany. Until his sixteenth year, the boy's education was entrusted to his cousin Patrick Plunkett, Abbot of St Mary's, Dublin and brother of Luke Plunkett, the first Earl of Fingall, who later became successively Bishop of Ardagh and of Meath. As an aspirant to the priesthood, he set out for Rome in 1647, under the care of Father Pierfrancesco Scarampi of the Roman Oratory. At this time the Irish Confederate Wars were raging in Ireland; these were essentially conflicts between native Irish Catholics, English and Irish Anglicans and Nonconformists. Scarampi was the Papal envoy to the Catholic movement known as the Confederation of Ireland. Many of Plunkett's relatives were involved in this organisation.

He was admitted to the Irish College in Rome and proved to be an able pupil. He was ordained a priest in 1654, and deputed by the Irish bishops to act as their representative in Rome. Meanwhile, the Cromwellian conquest of Ireland (1649–1653) had defeated the Catholic cause in Ireland; in the aftermath, the public practice of Catholicism was banned and Catholic clergy were executed. As a result, it was impossible for Plunkett to return to Ireland for many years. He petitioned to remain in Rome and, in 1657, became a professor of theology. Throughout the period of the Commonwealth and the first years of Charles II's reign, he successfully pleaded the cause of the Irish Catholic Church, and also served as theological professor at the College of Propaganda Fide. At the Congregation of Propaganda Fide on 9 July 1669 he was appointed Archbishop of Armagh, the Irish primatial see, and was consecrated on 30 November at Ghent by the Bishop of Ghent, Eugeen-Albert, count d'Allamont. He eventually set foot on Irish soil again on 7 March 1670, as the English Restoration of 1660 had begun on a basis of toleration. The pallium was granted him in the Consistory of 28 July 1670.

After arriving back in Ireland, he tackled drunkenness among the clergy, writing: "Let us remove this defect from an Irish priest, and he will be a saint". The Penal Laws had been relaxed in line with the Declaration of Breda in 1660 and he was able to establish a Jesuit College in Drogheda in 1670. A year later 150 students attended the college, no fewer than 40 of whom were Protestant, making this college the first integrated school in Ireland. His ministry was a successful one and he is said to have confirmed 48,000 Catholics over a four-year period. The government in Dublin, especially under the Lord Lieutenant of Ireland, the Duke of Ormonde (the Protestant son of Catholic parents) extended a generous measure of toleration to the Catholic hierarchy until the mid-1670s.

== Popish Plot ==
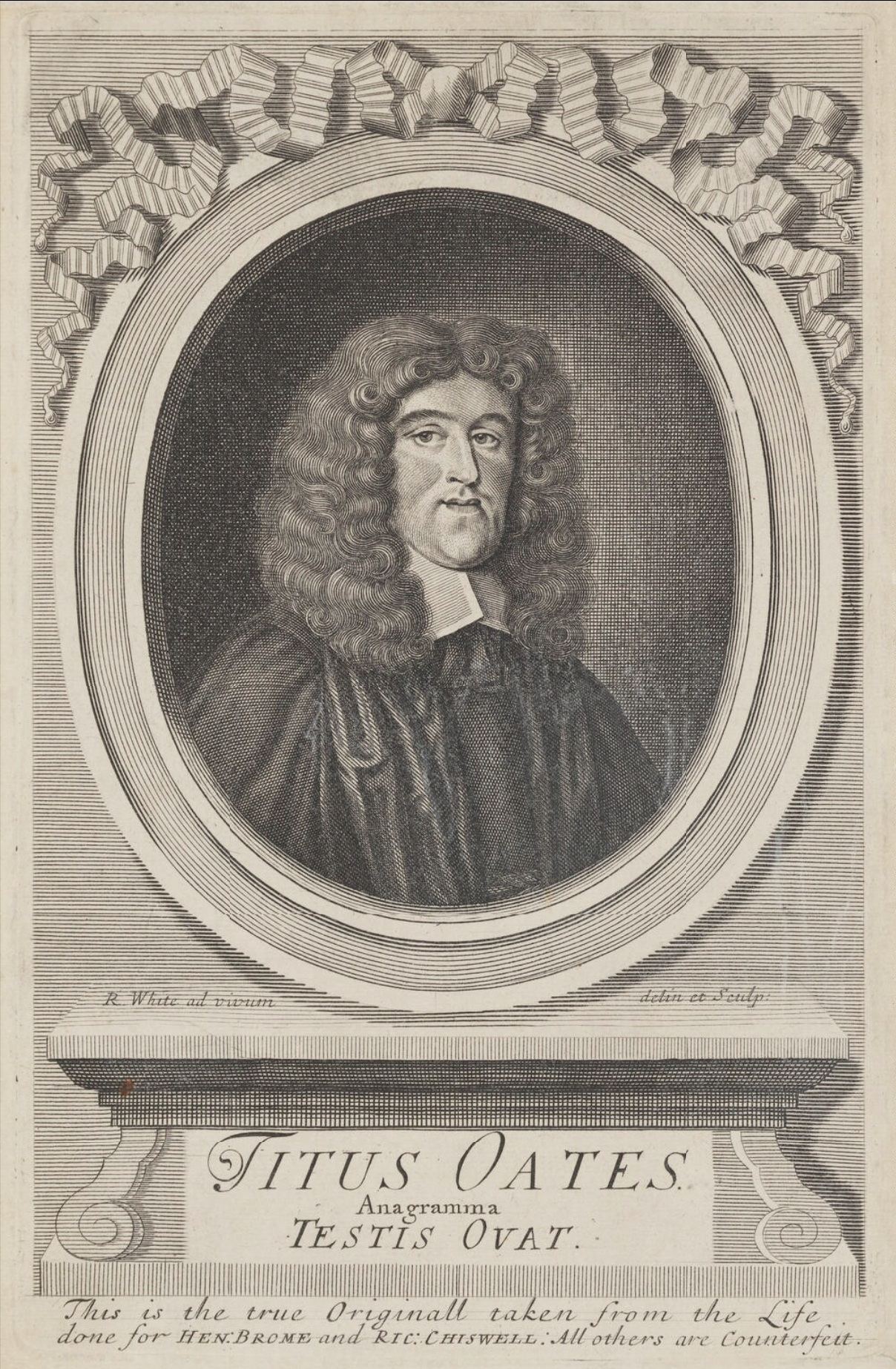
Titus Oates, perpetrator of the "Popish Plot"

On the enactment of the Stuart Restoration penal laws known as the Test Act in 1673, to which Plunkett would not agree for doctrinal reasons, the college was closed and demolished. Plunkett went into hiding, travelling only in disguise, and refused a government edict to register at a seaport to await passage into exile. For the next few years he was largely left in peace since the Dublin government, except when put under pressure from the English government in London, preferred to leave the Catholic bishops alone.

In 1678 the so-called Popish Plot, concocted in England by clergyman Titus Oates, led to further anti-Catholic action. Archbishop Peter Talbot of Dublin was arrested, and Plunkett again went into hiding. The Privy Council of England, in Westminster, was told that Plunkett had plotted a French invasion. The moving spirit behind the campaign is said to have been Arthur Capell, the first Earl of Essex, who had been Lord Lieutenant of Ireland in 1672–1677 and hoped to resume the office by discrediting the Duke of Ormonde. However Capell was not normally a ruthless or unprincipled man, and his later plea for mercy suggests that he had never intended that Plunkett should actually die.

=== Trial ===
Despite being on the run and with a price on his head, Plunkett refused to leave his flock. At some point before his final incarceration, he took refuge in a church that once stood in the townland of Killartry, in the parish of Clogherhead in County Louth, seven miles outside Drogheda. He was arrested in Dublin on 6 December 1679 and imprisoned in Dublin Castle, where he gave absolution to the dying Talbot. Plunkett was tried at Dundalk for conspiring against the state by allegedly plotting to bring 20,000 French soldiers into the country, and for levying a tax on his clergy to support 70,000 men for rebellion. Though this was unproven, some in government circles were worried about the possibility that a repetition of the Irish rebellion of 1641 was being planned and in any case, this was a convenient excuse for proceeding against Plunkett. The Duke of Ormonde, aware that Lord Essex was using the crisis to undermine him, did not defend Plunkett in public. In private however, he made clear his belief in Plunkett's innocence and his contempt for the informers against him: "silly drunken vagabonds ... whom no schoolboy would trust to rob an orchard".

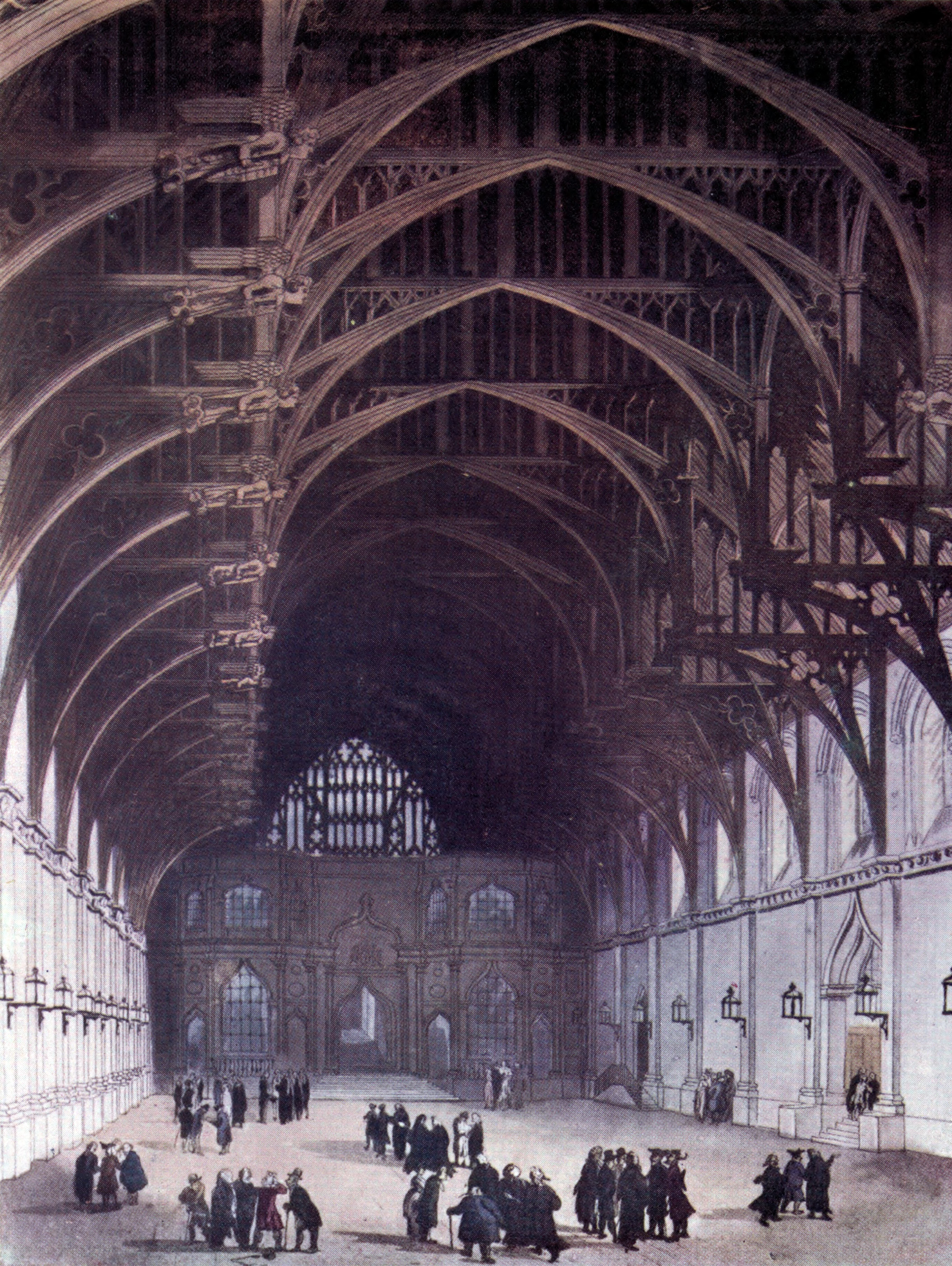
Westminster Hall, where Plunkett was tried

Plunkett did not object to facing an all-Protestant jury, but the trial soon collapsed as the prosecution witnesses were themselves wanted men and afraid to turn up in court. Lord Shaftesbury knew Plunkett would never be convicted in Ireland, irrespective of the jury's composition, and so had Plunkett moved to Newgate Prison in London in order to face trial at Westminster Hall. The first grand jury found no true bill, but he was not released. The second trial has generally been regarded as a serious miscarriage of justice; Plunkett was denied defending counsel (although Hugh Reily acted as his legal adviser) and time to assemble his defence witnesses, and he was also frustrated in his attempts to obtain the criminal records of those who were to give evidence against him. His servant James McKenna, and a relative, John Plunkett, had travelled back to Ireland and failed within the time available to bring back witnesses and evidence for the defence. During the trial, Archbishop Plunkett had disputed the right of the court to try him in England and he also drew attention to the criminal past of the witnesses, but to no avail. Lord Chief Justice Sir Francis Pemberton addressing these complaints said to Plunkett: "Look you, Mr. Plunkett, it is in vain for you to talk and make this discourse here now ..." and later on again: "Look you, Mr. Plunkett, don't mis-spend your own time; for the more you trifle in these things, the less time you will have for your defence".

The Scottish clergyman and future Bishop of Salisbury, Gilbert Burnet, an eyewitness to the Plot trials, had no doubt of the innocence of Plunkett, whom he praised as a wise and sober man who wished only to live peacefully and tend to his congregation. Writing in the 19th century, Lord Campbell said of the judge, Pemberton, that the trial was a disgrace to himself and his country. More recently the High Court judge Sir James Comyn called it a grave mistake: while Plunkett, by virtue of his office, was clearly guilty of "promoting the Catholic faith", and may possibly have had some dealings with the French, there was never the slightest evidence that he had conspired against the King's life.

=== Execution ===
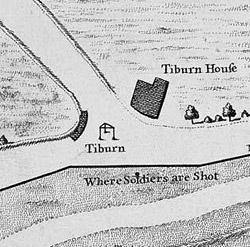
Map of Tyburn gallows and immediate surroundings

Archbishop Plunkett was found guilty of high treason in June 1681 "for promoting the Roman faith", and was condemned to death. In passing judgement, the Chief Justice said: "You have done as much as you could to dishonour God in this case; for the bottom of your treason was your setting up your false religion, than which there is not any thing more displeasing to God, or more pernicious to mankind in the world". The jury returned within fifteen minutes with a guilty verdict and Archbishop Plunkett replied: "Deo Gratias" (Latin for "Thanks be to God").

Numerous pleas for mercy were made but Charles II, although himself a reputed crypto-Catholic, thought it too politically dangerous to spare Plunkett. The French ambassador to England, Paul Barillon, conveyed a plea for mercy from his king, Louis XIV. Charles told him frankly that he knew Plunkett to be innocent, but that the time was not right to take so bold a step as to pardon him. Lord Essex, apparently realising too late that his intrigues had led to the condemnation of an innocent man, made a similar plea for mercy. The King, normally the most self-controlled of men, turned on Lord Essex in fury, saying: "his blood be on your head – you could have saved him but would not, I would save him and dare not".

Plunkett was hanged, drawn and quartered at Tyburn on 1 July 1681 (11 July NS), aged 55, the last Catholic martyr to die in England. His body was initially buried in two tin boxes, next to five Jesuits who had died previously, in the courtyard of St Giles in the Fields church. The remains were exhumed in 1683 and moved to the Benedictine monastery at Lamspringe, near Hildesheim in Germany. The head was brought to Rome, and from there to Armagh, and eventually to Drogheda where since 29 June 1921 it has rested in Saint Peter's Church. Most of the body was brought to Downside Abbey, England, where the major part is located today, with some parts remaining at Lamspringe. On the occasion of his canonization in 1975 his casket was opened and some parts of his body were given to St Peter's Church in Drogheda, Ireland, and also to the new Worth Abbey Church consecrated in 13 July 1975.

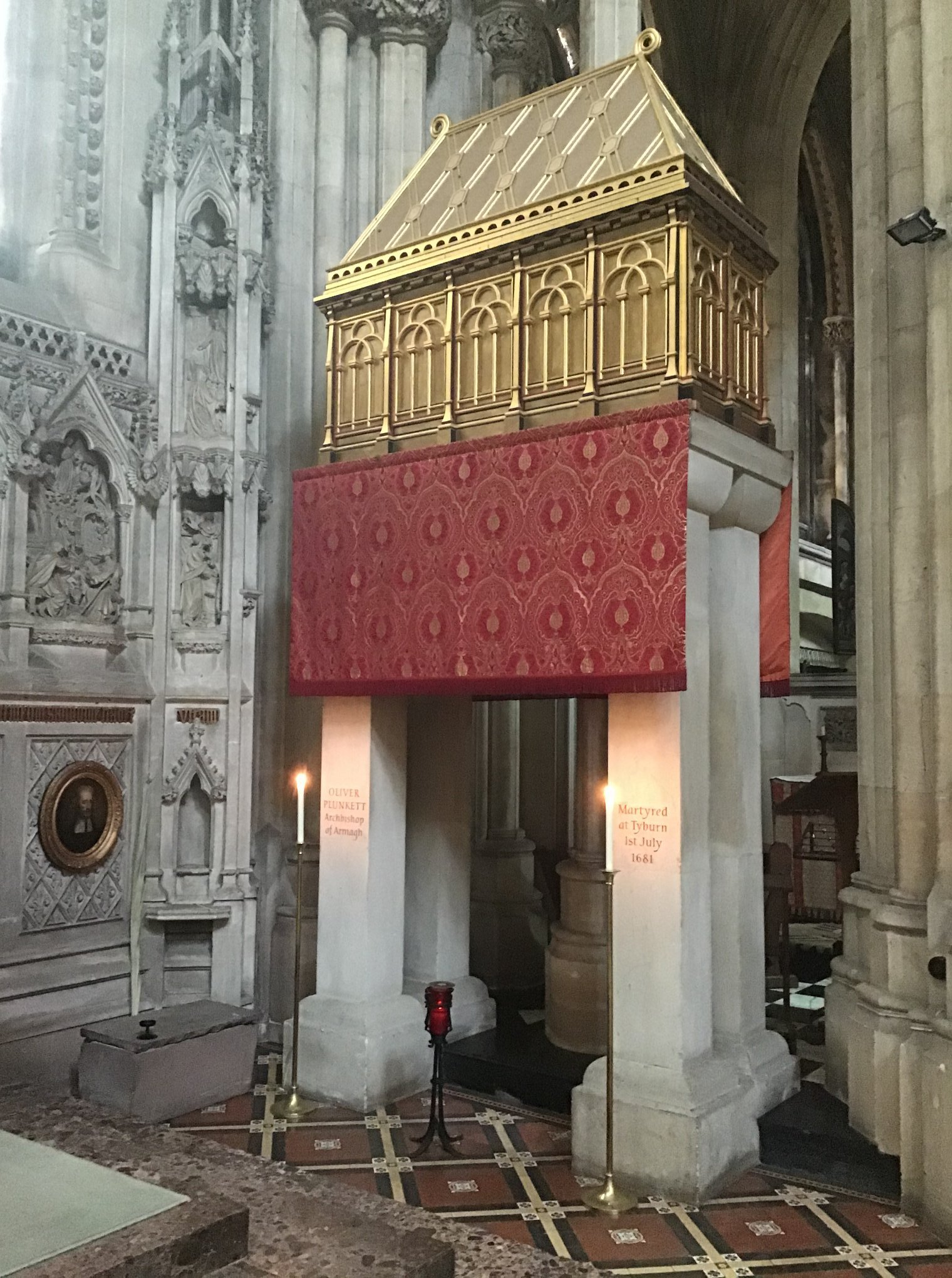
St Oliver Plunkett casket in Downside Abbey

== Legacy ==
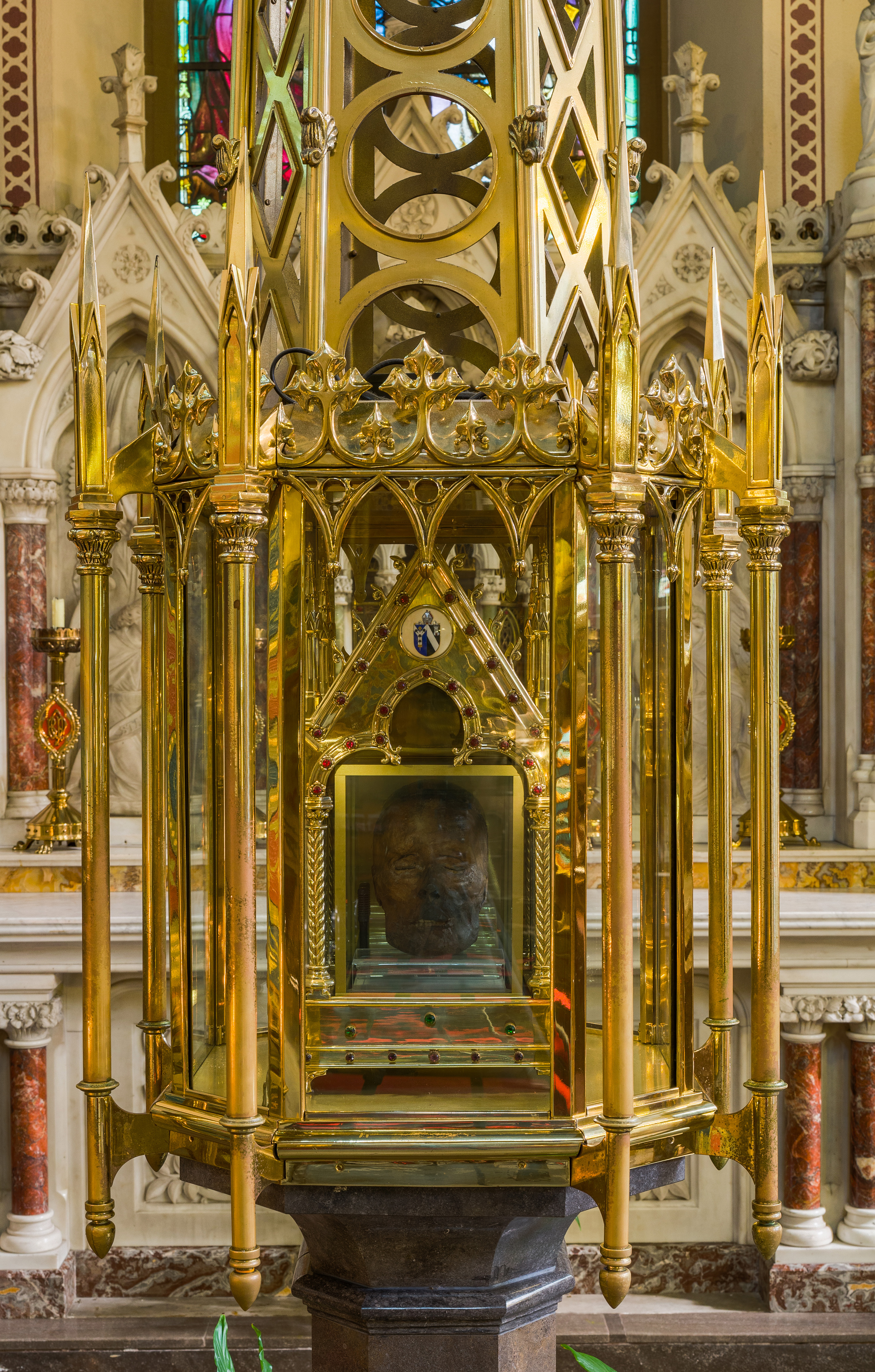
St Oliver Plunkett's head

Oliver Plunkett was beatified on 23 May 1920 by Pope Benedict XV. The cause for his canonization was opened on 27 July 1951, and he was canonized in 1975, the first new Irish saint for almost seven hundred years, and the first of the Irish martyrs to be beatified. For the canonisation, the customary second miracle was waived. He has since been followed by 17 other Irish martyrs who were beatified by Pope John Paul II in 1992. Among them were Archbishop Dermot O'Hurley, Margaret Ball, and the Wexford Martyrs.

In 1920 a mosaic of him at Westminster Cathedral, London, was created by Boris Anrep.

As a spectacle alone, a rally and Mass for St Oliver Plunkett on London's Clapham Common was a remarkable triumph. The Common was virtually taken over for a celebration of the 300th anniversary of Plunkett's martyrdom. Cardinal Tomás Ó Fiaich, twenty enrobed bishops and a number of abbots mounted a stage beneath a scaffolding shelter on 1 July 1981. Ó Fiaich had flown there in a helicopter with Plunkett's head. The occasion attracted thousands of pilgrims to the park.

In 1997 Plunkett was made a patron saint for peace and reconciliation in Ireland, adopted by the prayer group campaigning for peace in Ireland, "St. Oliver Plunkett for Peace and Reconciliation".

In 2023, a pastoral area of the Roman Catholic Diocese of Clifton was named in honour of Plunkett.

=== Dedications to Oliver Plunkett ===
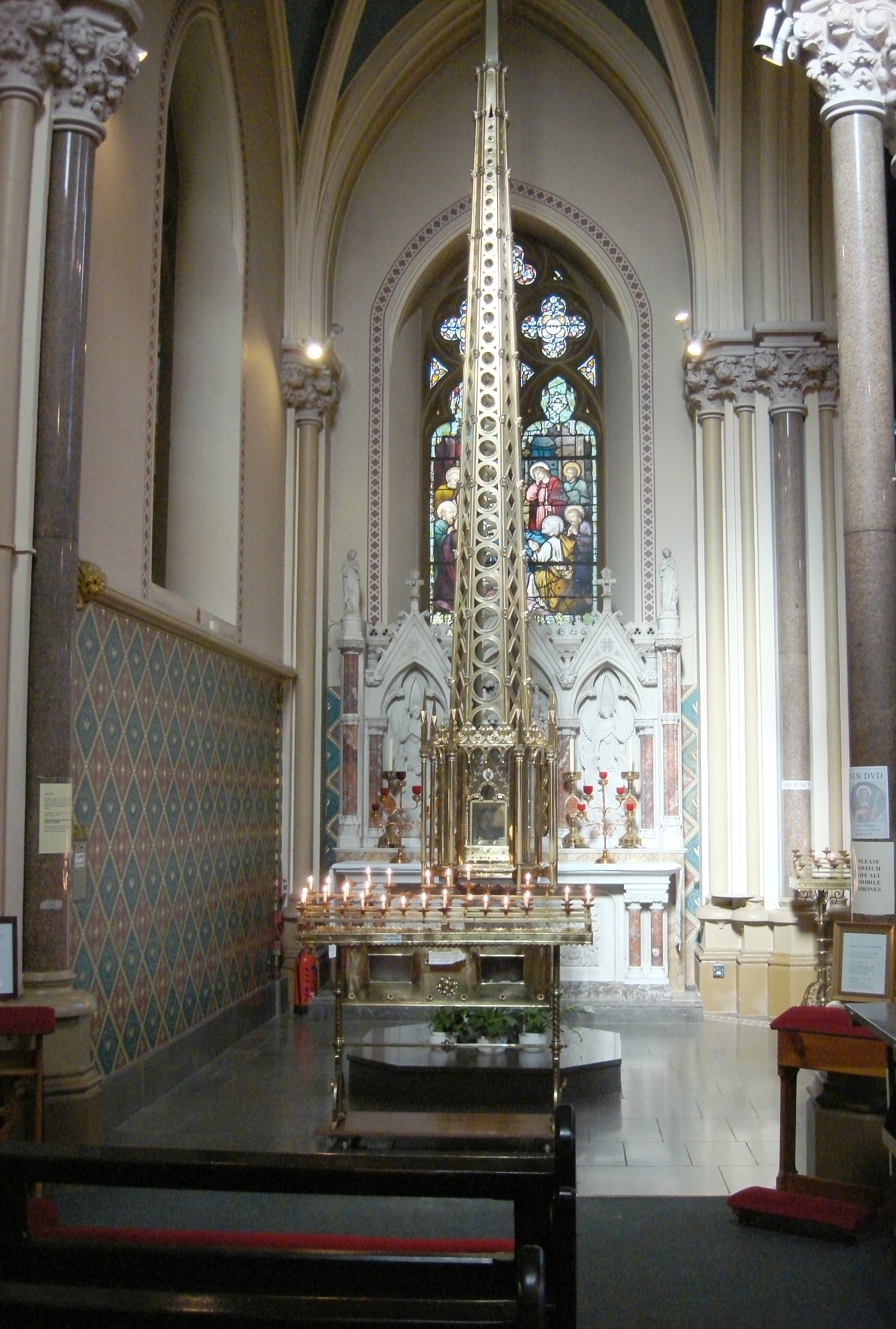
The shrine of St Oliver Plunkett, in St Peter's, Drogheda

Religious and church sites:

- St. Oliver Plunkett Church, Diocese of Down and Connor, County Antrim
- St. Oliver Plunkett Church, Mungret, Limerick
- St. Peter's Catholic Church, Drogheda, County Louth
- Church of St. Oliver Plunkett, Blackrock, County Louth
- St. Oliver Plunkett's Church, Kilcloon, Co. Meath
- St. Oliver Plunkett's Church, Clonmel, County Tipperary
- St. Oliver Plunkett Church, Renmore, County Galway
- Church of St. Brigid and St. Oliver Plunkett, Inishmore, Aran Islands, County Galway
- Shrine at Loughcrew, County Meath
- Downside Abbey, Somerset
- St. Oliver Plunkett Catholic Church, Snellville, Georgia
- St. Oliver Plunkett Catholic Church, Strathfoyle, County Londonderry, Northern Ireland Diocese of Derry
- St. Oliver Plunkett’s Church, Forkhill, County Armagh, Archdiocese of Armagh
- St. Oliver Plunkett Parish (Consolidated), Fredericktown, Pennsylvania
- St. Oliver's Cemetery, Cork City, County Cork
- St. Oliver Plunkett Catholic Church, Darlington Point, New South Wales Australia
- St. Oliver Plunkett's Parish, Cannon Hill, Queensland Australia
- St. Oliver Plunkett's Parish, Harris Park, New South Wales, Australia
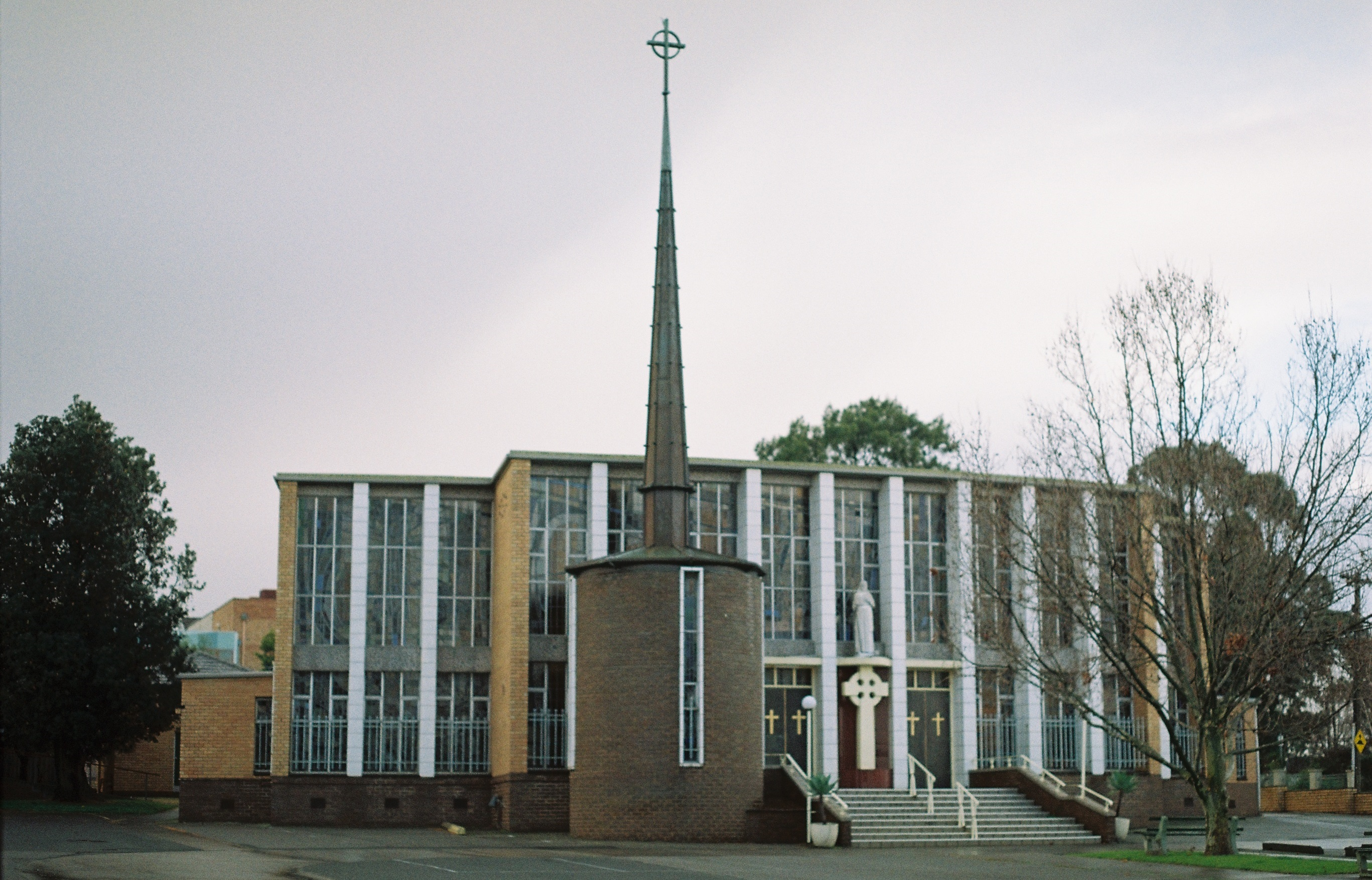
  St Oliver Plunkett Catholic Church Pascoe Vale, Victoria Australia
- St. Oliver Plunkett's Parish, Pascoe Vale, Victoria, Australia
- The Church of Our Lady St Mary of Glastonbury, Somerset, England, contains relics from Oliver Plunkett in all of its reliquaries.

Schools:

- Scoil Oilibhéir SN, Baile Átha Cliath 15
- Scoil Oilibhéir Naofa, Kilcloon, Co. Meath
- St. Oliver Plunkett National School, Balrothery, County Dublin
- St. Oliver Plunkett's Post Primary School, Oldcastle, County Meath
- St. Oliver Plunkett's National School, Clonmel, County Tipperary
- St. Oliver Plunkett Primary School, Beragh, County Tyrone
- St. Oliver Plunkett National School, Blackrock, County Louth
- St. Oliver Plunkett National School, Newcastle, Athenry
- St. Oliver Plunkett National School, Kilkerrin, County Galway
- St. Oliver Plunkett School, Belfast, County Antrim
- St. Oliver Plunkett's Primary School, Forkhill, County Armagh
- St. Oliver Plunkett's Primary School, Kilmore, County Armagh
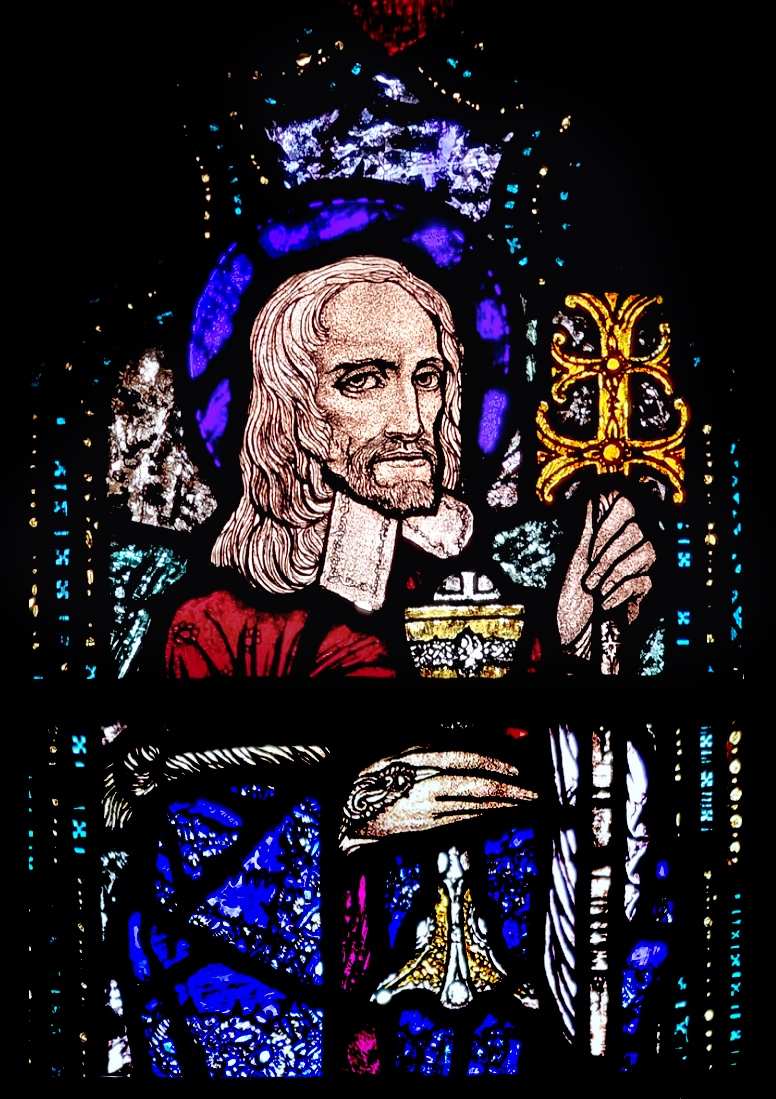
  Oliver Plunkett by Harry Clarke Studios at St. Joseph's Carrickmacross
- St. Oliver Plunkett School, Malahide, County Dublin
- Blessed Oliver Plunkett Boys' National School, Moate, County Westmeath
- St. Oliver Plunkett National School, Navan, County Meath
- St. Oliver Plunkett's Primary School, Newtownhamilton, County Armagh
- Downside School, Somerset
- Oliver Plunkett's Primary School, Strathfoyle, County Londonderry
- Mayfield College, Sussex
- St. Oliver's Primary School, Harris Park, New South Wales, Australia
- St. Oliver Plunkett Primary School, Cannon Hill, Queensland, Australia
- St. Oliver Plunkett Primary School, Pascoe Vale, Victoria, Australia
- St. Oliver Plunkett NS, Monkstown, County Dublin
- St. Oliver Plunkett NS, Killina, County Kildare
- St Oliver's National School, Killarney, County Kerry
- St. Oliver's Community College, Drogheda, County Louth

Sports:

- St. Oliver Plunkett Park, Crossmaglen, County Armagh
- St. Oliver Plunkett Park, Emyvale, County Monaghan
- Oliver Plunketts GFC, Drogheda, County Louth.
- Oliver Plunkett's GAA, Ahiohill, County Cork
- St Oliver Plunkett Eoghan Ruadh GAA, Dublin, County Dublin
- Greenlough GAC, Clady, County Londonderry
- Oliver Plunkett Cup of the Cavan Senior Football Championship
- St. Olivers GAA, Waterford, County Waterford

Other:

- Oliver Plunkett Street, Cork City, County Cork
- St. Oliver Plunkett Place, Doneraile, County Cork
- St. Oliver Plunkett Road, Letterkenny, County Donegal
- St Oliver Plunkett Rd. Ballymore Eustace. County Kildare
- St. Oliver Plunkett's Bridge, County Offaly
- Oliver Plunkett Street, Mullingar, County Westmeath
- Oliver Plunkett Road, Monkstown, County Dublin
- Oliver Plunkett Avenue, Monkstown, County Dublin
- EI-FCY, an aeroplane in the Aer Lingus fleet, is named St. Oliver Plunkett / Oilibhéar Pluincéid
- Plunkett Street, Killarney, County Kerry
- Plunkett Avenue, Mervue, Galway city.

=== In popular culture ===
- In Harold Pinter's The Birthday Party, McCann asks Stanley "What about the blessed Oliver Plunkett?"
- In J. P. Donleavy's The Ginger Man, Sebastian Dangerfield repeatedly calls on the name of "the Blessed Oliver" and, towards the end of the book, receives a wooden carving of the saint's head.
- In David Caffrey's 2001 film On the Nose, Nana, played by Francis Burke refers to an Aboriginal person's head in a large specimen jar as "Oliver Plunkett".
- In Colin Bateman's 2004 novel, Bring Me the Head of Oliver Plunkett, the head of Oliver Plunkett is stolen from St. Peter's Church.
- Too Much Joy's 2021 album Mistakes Were Made includes a song called "Oliver Plunkett's Head".

== Works cited ==
- Blessed Oliver Plunkett: Historical Studies, Gill, Dublin, 1937.
- Cobbett, William; et al. (1810), Cobbett's Complete Collection of State Trials, Volume 8
- Comyn, Sir James (1981). Irish at Law. London: Secker and Warburg.
- Forristal, Desmond (1975), Oliver Plunkett in his own Words, Veritas Publications, ISBN 1853905674
- Glinert, Ed (2009), Martyrs & Mystics, Collins, ISBN 978-0-00-728642-3
- Hanly, John, ed. (1979), The Letters of Saint Oliver Plunkett, Dolmen Press
- Kenyon, J.P. (2000). The Popish Plot. Phoenix Press Reissue.

Catholic Church titles
Preceded by Edmund O'Reilly	Archbishop of Armagh; 1669 – 1681	Succeeded by Dominic Maguire
