= Grattan-Bellew baronets =

Baronetcy in the Baronetage of the United Kingdom

Escutcheon of the Grattan-Bellew Baronets

The Bellew (later Grattan-Bellew) baronetcy, of Mount Bellew in County Galway, is a title in the Baronetage of the United Kingdom. It was created on 15 August 1838 for Michael Bellew. He was a descendant of Christopher Bellew, brother of Sir Patrick Bellew, 1st Baronet (see Baron Bellew for further history of this branch of the family).

Thomas Bellew, younger son of the first Baronet, sat as member of parliament for County Galway. He married Pauline, daughter of Henry Grattan. Their son, the third Baronet, assumed by Royal licence the additional surname of Grattan. As of 2026 the title is held by the latter's great-grandson, the sixth Baronet, who succeeded his father in that year. The fifth baronet was a journalist, radio and television broadcaster and publisher.

== Bellew (later Grattan-Bellew) baronets, of Mount Bellew (1838) ==
- Sir Michael Dillon Bellew, 1st Baronet (1796–1855)
- Sir Christopher Bellew, 2nd Baronet (1818–1867)
- Sir Henry Christopher Grattan-Bellew, 3rd Baronet KHS (1860–1942)
- Sir Charles Christopher Grattan-Bellew, 4th Baronet, MC (1887–1948)
- Sir Henry Charles Grattan-Bellew, 5th Baronet (1933–2022)
- Sir Patrick Charles Grattan-Bellew, 6th Baronet (born 1971)

The heir presumptive is Charles Henry Mordaunt Grattan-Bellew (born 1964), a kinsman of the present holder.

== See also ==
- Baron Bellew
- Baron Bellew of Duleek

== Notes ==
Baronetage of the United Kingdom
Preceded by Guest baronets	Bellew baronets of Mount Bellew; 15 August 1838	Succeeded by Hall baronets
