= Ballew =

Ballew is a surname. Notable people with the surname include:

- Brady Ballew (born 1992), American soccer player
- Chris Ballew (born 1965), American musician
- Smith Ballew (1902–1984), American actor and singer

== See also ==
- Ken Ballew raid
- Ballew v. Georgia, a United States Supreme Court case
