= Baron Bellew of Duleek =

Baron Bellew of Duleek was a title in the Peerage of Ireland. It was created on 29 October 1686 for Sir John Bellew, as a reward for his support for James II. He was outlawed after the Glorious Revolution and the accession of William and Mary, a decision that was later reversed on 30 March 1697. Two of his sons, the second and third Barons, both succeeded in the barony. The latter was twice returned to parliament for Steyning, but was unseated both times. The title became extinct on the death of his son, the fourth Baron, in 1770.

This branch of the Bellew family descended from Sir Christopher Bellew, brother of John Bellew, ancestor of the Barons Bellew and the Grattan-Bellew baronets.

== Baron Bellew of Duleek (1686) ==
- John Bellew, 1st Baron Bellew of Duleek (outlawed 1691, died 1693)
- Walter Bellew, 2nd Baron Bellew of Duleek (died 1694)
- Richard Bellew, 3rd Baron Bellew of Duleek (c. 1664–1715)
- John Bellew, 4th Baron Bellew of Duleek (1702–1770)
