= Baron Bellew =

Title in the Peerage of Ireland

- Creation date: 10 July 1848
- Created by: Queen Victoria
- Peerage: Ireland
- First holder: Sir Patrick Bellew, 7th Baronet
- Present holder: Bryan Edward Bellew, 8th Baron
- Heir apparent: Hon. Anthony Richard Brooke Bellew
- Remainder to: the 1st Baron's heirs male of the body lawfully begotten.
- Seat: Barmeath Castle

Baron Bellew, of Barmeath in the County of Louth, is a title in the Peerage of Ireland. It was created on 17 July 1848 for Sir Patrick Bellew, 7th Baronet, who had previously represented Louth in the House of Commons as a Whig and also served as Lord Lieutenant of County Louth. His grandson, the third Baron, was also Lord Lieutenant of County Louth and sat in the House of Lords as an Irish representative peer from 1904 to 1911. He was succeeded by his younger brother, the fourth Baron. He was an Irish Representative Peer from 1914 to 1931. In 1881 Lord Bellew assumed by Royal licence the additional surname of Bryan under the terms of the will of his maternal uncle Colonel George Bryan. However, he is the only one of the Barons to have held this surname. On his death the titles passed to his nephew, the fifth Baron, and then to his younger brother, the sixth Baron. As of 2018 the titles are held by the latter's grandson, the eighth Baron, who succeeded in 2010.

The Bellew baronetcy, of Barmeath in the County of Louth, was created in the Baronetage of Ireland on 11 December 1688 for the first Baron Bellew's great-great-grandfather Patrick Bellew, a Jacobite supporter of James II. His brother Christopher Bellew was the ancestor of the Grattan-Bellew baronets, of Mount Bellew, a title created in 1838.

The family seat is Barmeath Castle, near Dunleer, County Louth. Another branch of the family was created Baron Bellew of Duleek in 1686 for their loyalty to James II.

== Bellew baronets, of Barmeath (1688) ==
- Sir Patrick Bellew, 1st Baronet (died 1716)
- Sir John Bellew, 2nd Baronet (c. 1660 – 1734)
- Sir Edward Bellew, 3rd Baronet (c. 1695 – 1741)
- Sir John Bellew, 4th Baronet (1728–1750)
- Sir Patrick Bellew, 5th Baronet (c. 1735 – 1795)
- Sir Edward Bellew, 6th Baronet (c. 1760 – 1827)
- Sir Patrick Bellew, 7th Baronet (1798–1866) (created Baron Bellew in 1848)

=== Barons Bellew (1848) ===
- Patrick Bellew, 1st Baron Bellew (1798–1866)
- Edward Joseph Bellew, 2nd Baron Bellew (1830–1895)
- Charles Bertram Bellew, 3rd Baron Bellew (1855–1911)
- George Leopold Bryan Bellew-Bryan, 4th Baron Bellew (1857–1935)
- Edward Henry Bellew, 5th Baron Bellew (1889–1975)
- Bryan Bertram Bellew, 6th Baron Bellew (1890–1981)
- James Bryan Bellew, 7th Baron Bellew (1920–2010)
- Bryan Edward Bellew, 8th Baron Bellew (born 1943)

The heir apparent is the present holder's surviving son, the Hon. Anthony Richard Brooke Bellew (born 1972).
The heir apparent's heir-in-line is his son, Oliver James Bellew (born 2003).

== Coat of arms ==
The heraldic blazon for the coat of arms of the barony is: Sable, fretty or.

== See also ==
- Grattan-Bellew baronets
- Baron Bellew of Duleek
