= Barmeath Castle =

Castle in County Louth, Ireland

Coordinates: 53.8267°N 6.3365°W

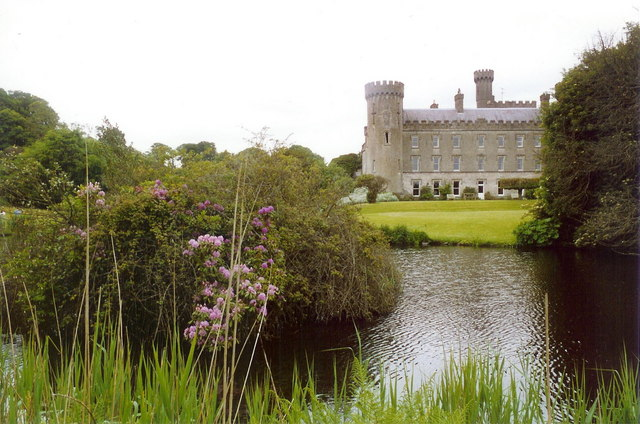
Barmeath Castle

Barmeath Castle is a country house near Dunleer in the centre of County Louth. Of note are the castle's 10 acres of gardens designed by the 18th-century landscape architect Thomas Wright.

Barmeath Castle was erected in the 15th century and the Bellew family have lived there since 1670. It is the ancestral seat of the Barons Bellew.
