= Colin Bateman =

Northern Irish author and journalist

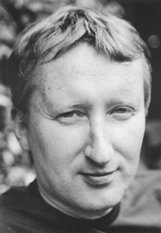
- Born: 13 June 1962 (age 64); Newtownards, Northern Ireland
- Education: Journalism
- Occupation: Novelist
- Spouse: Divorced
- Writing career
- Pen name: Bateman
- Language: English
- Genres: Crime, Dark comedy, Thriller
- Notable works: Dan Starkey, Murphy's Law & Mystery Man novels
- Notable awards: Betty Trask Award (1994); Crimefest Last Laugh (2009)
- Website: colinbateman.com

Colin Bateman (known mononymously as Bateman) is a novelist, screenwriter and former journalist from Bangor, County Down, Northern Ireland.

== Biography ==
Born on 13 June 1962, Bateman attended Bangor Grammar School leaving at 16 when he was hired by Annie Roycroft to join the County Down Spectator as a "cub" reporter, then columnist and deputy editor. A collection of his columns was published as Bar Stool Boy in 1989.

Bateman has been writing novels since his debut, Divorcing Jack, in 1994. Divorcing Jack won a Betty Trask Award in the same year and was adapted into a 1998 film starring David Thewlis. Several of Bateman's novels featured the semi-autobiographical Belfast journalist, Dan Starkey.

His book Murphy's Law was adapted from the BBC television series Murphy's Law (2001–2007), featuring James Nesbitt. Bateman explains on his website that "Murphy's Law was written specifically for James Nesbitt, a local actor who became a big TV star through Cold Feet. The ninety-minute pilot for Murphy's Law on BBC 1 was seen by more than seven million people, and led to three TV series, on which I was the chief writer".

His eight part series Scúp was written in English and translated into Irish. It was produced by Sterling Films & BBC Northern Ireland. A second series has since been commissioned.

His children's book Titanic 2020 was shortlisted for the 2008 Salford Children's Book Award.

Much of his work is produced under the name "Bateman" (rather than his full name); his 2007 novel I Predict a Riot bears (among others) the dedication: "For my Christian name, gone but not forgotten". Since 2016 Bateman has moved increasingly into film, writing the screenplays for The Journey, starring Timothy Spall and Colm Meaney, and Driven starring Jason Sudeikis and Lee Pace. Both films were premiered at the Venice Film Festival and selected for the Toronto Film Festival. He is currently writing films about Fidel Castro in New York, The Hotel Theresa and the British double agent, George Blake.

== Novels ==
=== For children ===
Eddie & the Gang with No Name

- Reservoir Pups (2003)
- Bring Me the Head of Oliver Plunkett (2004)
- The Seagulls Have Landed (2005)

Titanic 2020

- Titanic 2020 (2007)
- Titanic 2020: Cannibal City (2008)

SOS Adventures

- Ice Quake (2010)
- Fire Storm (2010)
- Tusk (2011)

=== For adults ===
Dan Starkey

- Divorcing Jack (1995)
- Of Wee Sweetie Mice and Men (1996)
- Turbulent Priests (1999)
- Shooting Sean (2001)
- The Horse with My Name (2002)
- Driving Big Davie (2004)
- Belfast Confidential (2005)
- Nine Inches (2011)
- Fire and Brimstone (2013)
- The Dead Pass (2014)

Martin Murphy

- Murphy's Law (2002)
- Murphy's Revenge (2005)

Mystery Man

- Mystery Man (2009)
- The Day of the Jack Russell (2009)
- Dr. Yes (2010)
- The Prisoner of Brenda (2012)

Non-Series

- Cycle of Violence (1995)
- Empire State (1997)
- Maid of the Mist (1999)
- Mohammed Maguire (2001)
- Wild About Harry (2001)
- Chapter and Verse (2003)
- I Predict A Riot (2007)
- Orpheus Rising (2008)
- Paper Cuts (2016)

== Film and TV ==
- Divorcing Jack (1998)
- Crossmaheart (1998)
- Wild About Harry (2000)
- Turbulent Priests (Unproduced – Bateman having written the screenplay) (2000)
- Watermelon (2003)
- Scúp (TV, 2013–14)
- The Journey (2016)
- Driven (2018)
- Dead and Buried
- Killing Castro (2025)

== See also ==
- List of Northern Irish writers
