= Firestorm (disambiguation) =

A firestorm is a fire that creates its own wind system.

Firestorm may also refer to:

== Film and television ==
- Firestorm (1998 film), a 1998 action thriller
- Firestorm (2013 film), a 2013 Hong Kong action film
- Firestorm (TV series), a Japanese anime co-created by Gerry Anderson
- "Firestorm" (The Orville), a 2017 television episode
- Firestorm, a series of robots that competed on the program Robot Wars

== Literature ==
- Firestorm (character), several characters in the DC Comics universe
- Firestorm (novel), a novel by David Sherman and Dan Cragg
- Firestorm, the first novel in The Caretaker Trilogy by David Klass
- Fire Storm (novel), a 2010 novel by Colin Bateman
- Firestorm, a 2014 novel by Lauren St John
- Young Sherlock Holmes: Fire Storm, a novel by Andy Lane

== Video games ==
- Firestorm: Thunderhawk 2, a 1995 combat flight simulator
- Command & Conquer: Tiberian Sun – Firestorm, a 2000 video game expansion pack
- Firestorm, a third party viewer for Second Life
- Firestorm, a battle royale mode for Battlefield V

== Music ==
- Firestorm (Diedre Murray and Fred Hopkins album), a 1992 album by cellist Diedre Murray and bassist Fred Hopkins
- Firestorm (EP), a 1993 EP by Metalcore band Earth Crisis
- Firestorm (Tvangeste album), a 2003 album by symphonic black metal band Tvangeste
- "Firestorm" (song), a 2015 song by Conchita Wurst
- "Firestorm", a song by Sabaton from the 2008 album Art of War

== Other uses ==
- Firestorm Books & Coffee, an anarchist infoshop in Asheville, North Carolina, U.S.
- Firestorm Tactical Card Game, a collectible card game
- Honda VTR1000F or Firestorm, a motorcycle by Honda
- Adam Firestorm (1976–2009), New Zealand-Canadian professional wrestler
- Firestorm, a fireboat made by MetalCraft Marine
- Firestorm, a high performance CPU core design implemented in the Apple A14 and Apple M1 processors
