= Of Wee Sweetie Mice and Men =

1996 novel by Colin Bateman

- First edition
- Author: Colin Bateman
- Language: English
- Series: Dan Starkey novels
- Genre: Crime, Dark comedy
- Publisher: UK: HarperCollins; USA: Arcade
- Publication date: 25 April 1996
- Publication place: United Kingdom
- Media type: Print (Hardcover)
- Pages: 333
- ISBN: 978-0-00-225237-9
- OCLC: 35785640
- Dewey Decimal: 823.914
- LC Class: PR6052.A773 O37 1996
- Preceded by: Divorcing Jack (1995)
- Followed by: Turbulent Priests (1999)

Of Wee Sweetie Mice and Men is the second novel of the Dan Starkey series by Northern Irish author, Colin Bateman, released on 25 April 1996 through HarperCollins. The name of the novel is a reference to the John Steinbeck novella Of Mice and Men.

== Plot ==
Protagonist Dan Starkey is tasked with writing a book about "Bobby Fat Boy McMaster", the current heavyweight champion of Ireland, in his upcoming championship fight with Mike Tyson on St. Patrick's Day. When McMaster's wife is kidnapped, Starkey must figure out who's behind it before the varied and numerous factions that McMaster has offended, in his short time in New York, catch up with them.

== Reception ==
With characteristic imaginative flair, Bateman works an astonishing number of issues into the plot, including racism, bigotry, religious extremism, alcoholism and inter-ethnic romance—and that's just for starters.

— Publishers Weekly

The novel received generally positive acclaim, with reviewers praising the novels humour while noting that it is not of the same quality as the previous Starkey novel, Divorcing Jack.

Publishers Weekly stated that the novel is "not as tight and focused as Bateman's previous work" and notes that the novel "reflects a distinct political and religious bias, which will surprise readers who appreciated Starkey's earlier, more tongue-in-cheek approach to Northern Ireland sectarianism". They did, however, also state that: "nevertheless, Bateman delivers the kind of humour and sense of the ridiculous that his fans will relish". Kirkus Reviews took a similar stance, stating that the novel is "more relaxed and less wildly funny than Divorcing Jack or Cycle of Violence – but then that's what you'd expect when the brutality is only a game".
