= Belfast Confidential =

2005 novel by Colin Bateman

- First edition
- Author: Colin Bateman
- Language: English
- Series: Dan Starkey novels
- Genre: Crime, Dark comedy
- Publisher: Headline
- Publication date: 7 November 2005
- Publication place: United Kingdom
- Media type: Print (Hardcover)
- Pages: 410
- ISBN: 978-0-7553-0925-2
- OCLC: 254860015
- Dewey Decimal: 823.914
- LC Class: PR6052.A773
- Preceded by: Driving Big Davie (2004)
- Followed by: Nine Inches (2011)

Belfast Confidential is the seventh novel of the Dan Starkey series by Northern Irish author, Colin Bateman, released on 7 November 2005 through Headline Publishing Group.

== Plot ==
The plot of the novel surrounds Dan Starkey and his recent appointment as the editor of Belfast's trendiest magazine, Belfast Confidential; described by Bateman as "a cross between Private Eye and Hello". After the murder of his close friend Mark McBride, AKA "Mouse", Starkey is convinced by Mouse's Thai bride to take over the editorship and discover who was behind the murder. Starkey discovers that Mouse was working on a list of the 50 most powerful people in the area before his death and decides that those at the top are the most likely suspects. He sets out to discover if this is indeed the case.

== Reception ==
Stuffed with bored ex-terrorists looking for kicks, and a suddenly booming economy, Belfast makes a great setting for a crime caper.

— Daily Mirror

The novel was well received by the media.

In a review for The Daily Telegraph, Jake Kerridge stated that "the dialogue is extremely funny and Bateman obviously works hard on his easy-going prose". He further went on to state that he felt that "the wearyingly frenetic Brookmyre could learn something from Bateman's style". The Daily Mirror also reviewed the novel and called the series as a whole "compelling and darkly humorous", stating (given this being the second Bateman release of 2005) "the bard of Belfast is on a roll". The reviewer did state that they felt that "the plot takes ages to get going", attributing this to "too much introspective loafing and lager drinking by sad Starkey". The reviewer did temper this somewhat, however, stating that "Colin Bateman is clearly the right man, in the right place at the right time". Geoff, on-line reviewer for Opinionated Geek found that, as "it's written by a genuine Norn Ironer" it "gives it a bit more credibility". He goes on to state "And it's fun. It's a nice enough story that features the usual mix of intrigue, pain and hangovers". He further felt that "there's maybe a bit more depth here than in the earlier books, like Divorcing Jack, but it's still a fairly light read".
