= Dan Starkey (series) =

Novel series by Colin Bateman

- Divorcing Jack; Of Wee Sweetie Mice and Men; Turbulent Priests; Shooting Sean; The Horse with My Name; Driving Big Davie; Belfast Confidential; Nine Inches
- Author: Colin Bateman
- Country: England
- Language: English
- Genre: Murder mystery
- Publisher: HarperCollins
- Published: 1995–2011
- Media type: Print (hardcover and paperback)
- No. of books: 8

The Dan Starkey novel series is written by Colin Bateman. It revolves around the private detective Dan Starkey and cases that Starkey investigates.

== Characters ==
- Dan Starkey — married, private detective, ex-journalist
- Patricia — long-suffering wife of Dan Starkey

== 1990s ==
Events of Bateman's debut novel Divorcing Jack (1995), set in Belfast, Northern Ireland, follow a turbulent period in the life of married, cynical and usually drunk journalist Dan Starkey. Dan's wife Patricia leaves him after a drunken party in which he kisses student Margaret. What follows is a darkly comical tale of murder and mystery. The novel was adapted into the film with the same name.

In Of Wee Sweetie Mice and Men (1996), protagonist Dan Starkey is tasked with writing a book about "Bobby Fat Boy McMaster", the current heavyweight champion of Ireland, in his upcoming championship fight with Mike Tyson on St. Patrick's Day. When McMaster's wife is kidnapped, Starkey must figure out who's behind it before the varied and numerous factions that McMaster has offended, in his short time in New York, catch up with them.

In Turbulent Priests (1999), based on Wrathlin Island, a small island north of mainland Ireland, Dan Starkey has been sent by Cardinal Daley, the Primate of All Ireland, to investigate reports that the Messiah has returned in the shape of a young girl, Christine, about to start school. Starkey has his wife Patricia and illegitimate child "Little Stevie" join him as he investigates the tiny dry community and meets considerable resistance from the defensive residents.

== 2000s ==
In Shooting Sean (2001), Dan Starkey is employed by legendary film star, Sean O'Toole, who is looking to escape his type cast action hero career and move into directing movies. Unfortunately, O'Toole is making a movie based on an infamous IRA member, nicknamed "The Colonel", and events soon lead to Starkey once again struggling to both protect his wife Patricia and illegitimate child "Little Stevie", while also keeping himself alive and writing.

In The Horse with My Name (2002), Dan Starkey is currently both unemployed and single. His estranged wife Patricia, after cancelling their counselling sessions with Relate, has entered into another relationship with someone called Clive and is currently living with him in the family home. Starkey receives a request from Mark Corkery, known as "The Horse Whisperer", to investigate racing entrepreneur Geordie McClean who is apparently not quite as clean as his name would suggest.

In Driving Big Davie (2004), Dan Starkey is invited to Florida by his old friend, "Big Davie", who has a spare honeymoon ticket after being dumped by his erstwhile fiancée. Starkey is back with his wife Patricia and feels he's gotten over the murder of his toddler son "Little Stevie" - however his wife disagrees and declares that an American road trip would do him good. When the opportunity to avenge Stevie's death presents itself, Starkey cannot refuse. A movie adaptation of the novel was planned in 2001, with Steve Bendelack attached as director.

Belfast Confidential (2005) surrounds Dan Starkey and his recent appointment as the editor of Belfast's trendiest magazine, Belfast Confidential, described by Bateman as "a cross between Private Eye and Hello". After the murder of his close friend Mark McBride, AKA "Mouse", Starkey is convinced by Mouse's Thai bride to take over the editorship and discover who was behind the murder. Starkey discovers that Mouse was working on a list of the 50 most powerful people in the area before his death and decides that those at the top are the most likely suspects. He sets out to discover if this is indeed the case.

== 2010s ==
In Nine Inches (2011), the four-year-old son of Jack Caramac, a shock jock radio broadcaster and old friend of Dan Starkey, is kidnapped for one hour and returned unharmed. Starkey, now a self-styled "upmarket private eye", is hired to investigate the kidnapping and ascertain who might have been behind it – a significant task given the number of people offended by Caramac's illustration of the crime and corruption prevalent throughout Belfast. Starkey's investigations lead him to the Miller brothers, officially the Chiefs of Staff for the Ulster Volunteer Force, although viewed by Starkey as merely a group of Shankill Road thugs intent on pedalling drugs across Belfast. The Millers have been attempting to evict a widow named Jean Murray from her house and Starkey intervenes, hoping his knowledge of their drug operation would dissuade any repercussions. Starkey's interference leads to the Murray's house being burnt down with Jean still inside.
