= Driving Big Davie =

2004 novel by Colin Bateman

- First edition
- Author: Colin Bateman
- Language: English
- Series: Dan Starkey novels
- Genre: Crime, Dark comedy
- Publisher: Headline
- Publication date: 5 April 2004
- Publication place: United Kingdom
- Media type: Print (Hardcover)
- Pages: 312
- ISBN: 978-0-7553-0919-1
- OCLC: 55624240
- Dewey Decimal: 823.914
- Preceded by: The Horse With My Name (2002)
- Followed by: Belfast Confidential (2005)

Driving Big Davie is the sixth novel of the Dan Starkey series by Northern Irish author, Colin Bateman, released on 5 April 2004 through Headline Publishing Group. Bateman started the novel in response to the death of Joe Strummer, lead singer of The Clash, who he stated was a "huge inspiration on [his] teenage years".

== Plot ==
Dan Starkey is invited to Florida by his old friend, "Big Davie", who has a spare honeymoon ticket after being dumped by his erstwhile fiancée. Starkey is back with his wife Patricia and feels he's gotten over the murder of his toddler son "Little Stevie" - however his wife disagrees and declares that an American road trip would do him good. When the opportunity to avenge Stevie's death presents itself, Starkey cannot refuse.

== Movie ==
A movie adaptation of the novel was planned in 2001, with Steve Bendelack attached as director.

== Reception ==
For those of you not in the know, Bateman is the funniest writer Ireland has produced since Roddy Doyle.

— Martin Doyle, Irish Post

The novel received little but positive coverage in the media.

Reviewing for the Irish Post, Martin Doyle stated he found Bateman's novels to be "pitch-black comic thrillers" and called the novel "a helter-skelter of high jinks and low humour"; stating that while the novel is not "a demanding read" he found it to be "a rewarding one". Andrea Henry, in a review for the Daily Mirror stated that, at the prospect of Starkey's vengeance for his murdered son, "fast and furious murder and mayhem ensue", and called the novel "laugh-a-minute lad lit".
