= Suspicion (2003 TV series) =

2003 British TV series

- Genre: Thriller
- Written by: Peter Whalley
- Directed by: Jamie Payne
- Starring: Amanda Redman; Adrian Dunbar; Saskia Reeves; Adam Kotz; Claudia Harrison; Tom Wisdom; William Beck; Matt Bardock; Tim Dantay
- Composer: Nick Bicât
- Country of origin: United Kingdom
- Original language: English
- No. of series: 1
- No. of episodes: 2

Production
- Executive producer: Carolyn Reynolds
- Producer: Hugh Warren
- Cinematography: Chris Seager
- Editor: Nick Arthurs
- Running time: 75 minutes
- Production company: Granada Television

Original release
- Network: ITV
- Release: 8 September – 9 September 2003

Suspicion is a two-part British television drama thriller, written by Peter Whalley and directed by Jamie Payne, that first broadcast on ITV between 8 and 9 September 2003. The series stars Amanda Redman as Carol Finnegan, a schoolteacher whose marriage of twenty years is threatened by a number of anonymous e-mails from an unidentified party only known as 'The Truth Teller', who claims her husband Mark (Adrian Dunbar) has been having an affair with his secretary, Rebecca (Claudia Harrison). When Claudia is found later found murdered, both Carol and Mark come under suspicion from the police.

The first episode of Suspicion attracted 8.56 million viewers, while the concluding episode attracted 8.31. In the United States, the series was edited down to three episodes, each of fifty minutes in length. Suspicion was released on Region 1 DVD in the United States on 3 October 2006 via Koch Vision, but remains unreleased on Region 2 DVD.

== Production ==
The series was filmed in and around Manchester and Cheshire.

== Reception ==
Memorable TV described the series as "an intriguing and tense thriller full of unexpected plot twists and surprises".

Nancy Banks-Smith for The Guardian gave the series a mildly positive review, writing; "The discordant soundtrack, migraine set to music, was as exceptionally effective as the dialogue itself was laconic. On the other hand, I found Amanda Redman's wig a sad distraction. This voluptuous actress with the most effective eyes on television was playing a suburban schoolteacher given to wearing various shades of biscuit and a particularly dingy syrup. I did feel that a good, strong, shameless bleach would have solved most of her problems."

Jane Simon for The Mirror was slightly more critical, writing; "It wasn't bad - I've certainly seen worse - but after 90 minutes of watching the first part of Suspicion, the abiding suspicion left at the end was that Suspicion, which concludes tonight was, in fact, nonsense. Slickly-made and quite well-acted but still utter nonsense."

== Cast ==
- Amanda Redman as Carol Finnegan
- Adrian Dunbar as Mark Finnegan
- Saskia Reeves as Julie Hopcroft
- Adam Kotz as Trevor Hopcroft
- Claudia Harrison as Rebecca Lomax
- Tom Wisdom as Stephen Clarke
- William Beck as Gareth Turner
- Matt Bardock as DS Richard Wilmot
- Tim Dantay as DC David Rice
- Eamonn Riley as Michael Faraday
- Juliet Howland as Millie Sanderson
- June Broughton as Mrs. Frith
