= Enda Oates =

Irish actor

- Born: 1962 (age 63–64); County Roscommon, Ireland
- Occupations: Stage, film, radio and television actor
- Years active: 1983–present
- Spouse: Louise Oates

Enda Oates (born 1962), occasionally credited as Enda Oats, is an Irish stage, film, and television actor. He has received attention for his stagework, but is best known to Irish television audiences as the Reverend George Black in the long-running series Glenroe for RTÉ, and as Barreller Casey in the sitcom Upwardly Mobile.

== Background ==
Oates was born in County Roscommon in 1962 and moved to Dublin in 1981 where he currently resides. He studied at Roscommon CBS, and earned a Leaving Certificate in 1980. The following year he attended Athlone Regional Technical College before becoming a civil servant for five years before becoming a thespian. His wife is named Louise and the couple have one son. Oates is also a noted horse enthusiast and has appeared on several television programmes about horses.

== Career ==
=== Film and television ===
Referred to as one of "Ireland’s foremost acting talents" by the Roscommon Herald, Oates' career has spanned over twenty years onstage, in radio, television and film. Although he made a 1984 appearance in Remington Steele, he turned professional in 1986 after sharing the Evening Herald "Newcomer of the Year Award", along with Aidan Gillen (The Wire). The official opening of the Strokestown International Poetry Festival was performed by Oates.

In 1989, his theatrical connections with actor/producer John Lynch saw him awarded the part of the Rev. George Black in the series Glenroe. Oates played Rev. George from 1989 to 1997 and was the role which made him widely recognizable to the general Irish public. In 1990, he had a minor role in the Pat O'Connor-directed film Fools of Fortune, about a Protestant family caught up in a conflict between Irish republicans and the British Army during the Troubles.

In 1994, Oates played the role of "The Garda" opposite Albert Finney and Michael Gambon in A Man of No Importance, a film which dealt with themes of homosexuality. Between 1995 and 1998 he played Barreller Casey in the Irish sitcom series Upwardly Mobile. In 1998 he had a small role the film St. Ives (televised in the UK as All for Love), based on the unfinished Robert Louis Stevenson novel. Oates also appeared in an episode of The Ambassador that same year.

In 2000, Oates starred in three episodes of Trí Scéal and played "Brian" in Ordinary Decent Criminal. Directed by Thaddeus O'Sullivan, the film is loosely based on the story of Martin Cahill, a famous Irish crime boss and featured Oates; the cast included Kevin Spacey, Helen Baxendale and Colin Farrell.

In 2000, Oates had a small role in An Everlasting Piece, a comedic film set in 1980s Northern Ireland, also with a subplot about the Troubles. In 2003, Oates had a minor role in the Joel Schumacher film, Veronica Guerin, about Irish journalist Veronica Guerin, murdered in 1996, which starred Cate Blanchett in the title role.

=== Theatrical work and recognition ===
Enda won a Best Male Performance Irish Film and Television Award (IFTA) in 2015 for his Role as Pete in RTE's Television Drama Fair City. Other nominees in the category included Brendan O Carroll for Mrs Browns Boys and fellow Roscommon colleague Chris O Dowd for Moone Boy.

In 1988, Oates appeared at the Gate Theatre in the Seán O'Casey play Juno and the Paycock, playing a furniture removal man. It was also performed at the John Golden Theatre on Broadway between 21 June–2 July 1988. Then in 1989, Oates appeared in the play Big Maggie at the Abbey Theatre, performed between 25 July–26 September 1989. In 1991 he appeared in a production of Plough and the Stars in London.."

Reporting on Oates' performance in Alan Stanford's production of MacBeth in 2006, the Irish Times critic opined that Oates' work as MacDuff was "thoroughly impressive". Also in 2006, the production of Little Green Men reports that "Well known Irish actor Enda Oates who takes one of the lead roles as Michael Greene in the new play said that he was 'hooked' on the idea after the success of the first production." In their review of Alan Stanford's 2007 production of the Brian Friel play Philadelphia, Here I Come!, The Irish Independent wrote "Among the theatrical high points is the poignant visit and awkward embrace of Gar from old schoolteacher, Master Boyle (Enda Oates)..."

In 2008, Oates played Shylock in the Merchant of Venice in the Helix Theatre. The Irish Times' review of the 2008 production of The Merchant of Venice offered, "...That leaves Shylock with Enda Oates putting his individual stamp on him. He shrugs aside servility to present a strong character in revolt against a lifetime..." As reported in Roscommon Herald, "An Irish Times theatre critic described his performance as riveting and one which was maintained to the end."

Of his work in Zinnie Harris's Further than the Furthest Thing (2008), Sophie Gorman of The Irish Independent wrote, "Enda Oates as the laconic island patriarch radiates suppressed force of character".

Donegal News reported Alan Stanford producing Macbeth again in 2008, with "a large cast of sixteen, some of whom are returning to their original parts, most notably Enda Oates, as MacDuff..." The Irish Independent, while noting the violence of gore inherent in the Shakespeare play, found "the production is nonetheless strangely bloodless and passionless" due to a "very odd interpretation of the central role by [thespian] David Shannon". Even with its flaws, it was noted that Oates was "a powerful Macduff".

== Theatre highlights ==
- Studs (Paul Mercier) 1986
- 1987- Jacques Brel is ... (Noel Pearson) 1987
- Juno and the Paycock 1988
- Big Maggie (Abbey Theatre) 1989
- Plough and the Stars (Young Vic) 1991
- The Field (Gaiety Theatre) 1994
- Uncle Vanya (as Astrov) Field Day, Tricycle London, 1995
- True Believers (Tricycle Irish Tour) Fishamble 1999
- Gulliver’s Travels – Gulliver (Ireland and Wales) 2001
- En Suite, 2002
- The Chastitute, 2003
- Pilgrims in the Park, 2004
- The Tempest (as Prospero) Corcadorca Theatre Co 2005
- The Ha’penny Bridge, The Point Theatre Dublin, 2005
- Little Green Men, 2006
- Macbeth – Macduff – Second Age Theatre Company 2006/2007/2008
- Philadelphia, Here I Come! Second Age Theatre Company 2007
- The Merchant of Venice 2008
- Further Than the Furthest Thing 2008
- The Dead School 2008

== Partial filmography ==
=== Television ===
- Remington Steele (1 episode, 1984)
- City Limits (1986)
- Errors and Omissions (1987)
- Small World (1 episode, 1987)
- Glenroe (1989–1997)
- Upwardly Mobile (1995–1998)
- The Ambassador (1 episode, 1998)
- Trí Scéal (3 episodes, 2000)
- Ballykissangel (1 episode, 2001)
- Bachelors Walk (2001-2003)
- Showbands (2005)
- Aifric (1 episode, 2006)
- The Stardust (2006) (Mini-series)
- Killinaskully (1 episode, 2007)
- The Clinic (2 episodes, 2005–2008)
- Val Falvey TD (2008)
- Fair City
- The Bailout (2017)

=== Film ===
- Fools of Fortune (1990)
- A Man of No Importance (1994)
- Crossmaheart (1998)
- St. Ives (1998)
- Ordinary Decent Criminal (2000)
- An Everlasting Piece (2000)
- Chaos (2002) (I)
- Veronica Guerin (2003)
- The Return of Gelert (2003)
- The Longest Ditch (An Diog is Faide) (2004)
- Rógairí (2005)
- Eden (2008)

== See also ==
- List of longest-serving soap opera actors#Ireland
