= Murphy's Revenge =

2005 novel by Colin Bateman

- Author: Colin Bateman
- Language: English
- Series: Martin Murphy novels
- Genre: Crime, Dark comedy
- Publisher: Headline
- Publication date: 4 April 2005
- Publication place: United Kingdom
- Media type: Print (Hardcover & Softcover)
- Pages: 314
- ISBN: 9780755309221
- OCLC: 58841667
- Preceded by: Murphy's Law (2005)

Murphy's Revenge is the second novel of the Martin Murphy series by Northern Irish author, Colin Bateman, published on 4 April 2005 through Headline Publishing Group.

== Plot ==
Martin Murphy is an undercover policeman currently working in London. He is assigned to investigate a support group for the friends and family of rape and murder victims, named Confront, as it appears they are planning and carrying out revenge killings.

== Characters ==
- Martin Murphy, undercover policeman working in London. He is haunted by the death of his son by IRA terrorists.
- Kate Murphy, Martin's sister.
- Father McBride, childhood friend to Murphy.
- Dr Jeffers, head of Confront.
- Andrea, a member of Confront whose father was killed by carjackers.
- Lawrence, a large man who is the partner of Andrea.

== Reception ==
The novel was well received. Sarah Broadhurst, of Love Reading stated "Murphy is a pleasing, laid-back character with a dry wit and lots of heart"; stating of the novel as a whole, "it's great". Reviewing for the Daily Mirror, Henry Sutton stated that "this is Bateman on top form once again". Lorna Reid, for the Irish Independent, commented on the strength and believability of the characters in the novel; the "emotionally and physically" messy Murphy, the "bleakness of the interaction" between Murphy and his widowed sister Kate; and "Murphy's sounding board on moral issues", a priest and child-hood friend known only as McBride. Reid called the novel a "fast-paced thriller", and stated that "the ending, as with all good thrillers, is unexpected, and leaves fans wishing to hear more of Murphy's exploits".
