= Claudia Harrison =

British actress (born 1976)

- Born: 1 January 1976 (age 50); Claygate, Surrey, England
- Education: Royal Academy of Dramatic Art
- Occupation: Actress
- Children: 3

Claudia Harrison (born 1 January 1976) is an English actress. She is best known for her roles in the TV series Murphy's Law (2001–2004) and The Crown (2022–2023).

== Career ==
Harrison portrays Queen Elizabeth II's daughter, Princess Anne, in the fifth and sixth seasons (2022–2023) of the drama series The Crown. She has had smaller television roles in series including Holby City, Humans, The IT Crowd, Midsomer Murders, Murphy's Law and Spooks. A review for PopMatters argued that Murphy's Law's "greatest strength lies in its casting of James Nesbitt and Claudia Harrison."

Harrison has also appeared in the film The Cat's Meow (2001), directed by Peter Bogdanovich.

== Personal life ==
Harrison was born in the village of Claygate, in the county of Surrey. She has three children.

== Filmography ==
=== Film ===
Year	Title	Role	Notes	Ref.
2001	The Cat's Meow	Margaret Livingston		
2002	Alone	Stacie		
2004	Oyster Farmer	Nikki Flange		

=== Television ===
Year	Title	Role	Notes	Ref.
2000	Attachments	Lucy "Luce" Jennings		
2001	Murphy's Law	Annie Guthrie	Television pilot	
2003	Suspicion	Rebecca Lomax		
2003	Reversals	Judith Hobart	Television film	
2003–2004	Murphy's Law	Annie Guthrie		
2004	Little Britain			
2005	Archangel	Louise	Television film	
2006	The Only Boy for Me	Leila	Television film	
2007	New Tricks	Trisha		
2008	Mutual Friends	Ally		
2008	Apparitions	Janice Greely		
2008	The IT Crowd	Delina		
2011	Case Sensitive	Cordy O'Hara		
2011	Holby City	Charlotte Foster		
2011	Midsomer Murders	Eleanor Preston		
2013	Lucan	Christine Shand-Kydd		
2016	Humans	Dr. Aveling		
2019	Delicious	Janice Woods		
2022–2023	The Crown	Anne, Princess Royal		
2025	Prisoner 951	Penny Madden		

== Awards and nominations ==
Year	Association	Category	Project	Result	Ref.
2023	Screen Actors Guild Awards	Outstanding Performance by an Ensemble in a Drama Series	The Crown	Nominated	
2024	Screen Actors Guild Awards	Outstanding Performance by an Ensemble in a Drama Series	The Crown	Nominated	
