= Murphy's Law (British TV series) =

Television series

- Series DVD artwork
- Genre: Crime thriller
- Created by: Colin Bateman
- Written by: Colin Bateman; Allan Cubitt; Russell Lewis
- Directed by: Brian Kirk; Colm McCarthy
- Starring: James Nesbitt; Del Synott; Mark Benton; Claudia Harrison; Owen Teale; Andrea Lowe; Robbie Gee; Ian Redford
- Country of origin: United Kingdom
- Original language: English
- No. of series: 5
- No. of episodes: 23

Production
- Executive producers: Greg Brenman; Robert Cooper; Carol-Ann Docherty; Andrew Lowe; Stephen Wright
- Producers: Sanne Craddick; Jemma Rodgers; Tom Sherry; Stephen Smallwood
- Production location: London
- Running time: 90 minutes (Series 1); 60 minutes (Series 2 onwards)
- Production company: Tiger Aspect Productions

Original release
- Network: BBC One
- Release: 24 September 2001 – 3 October 2007

Murphy's Law is a BBC television drama, produced by Tiger Aspect Productions for BBC Northern Ireland, starring James Nesbitt as undercover police officer Tommy Murphy. There were five series of the drama, shown on BBC One. The first two were composed of individual stories. Series three, four and five were each single stories composed over multiple episodes. Colin Bateman adapted the pilot for a novel.

A sixth series has not been commissioned. In a 2008 interview, Nesbitt attributed this to the fifth series' ratings being damaged after it was scheduled opposite ITV's popular drama Doc Martin.

All 23 episodes have since been released on DVD. All episodes from series two onwards were released as edited 50-minute masters instead of the 60-minute versions that were broadcast, except series 3 which was released uncut in the US. The first, second and third series were all released on 28 August 2006. The fourth and fifth series were released in a joint box-set on 15 October 2007.

== Plot ==
Detective Sergeant Tommy Murphy (James Nesbitt) is an uncompromising, sometimes tough-talking cop. He has no issues with using his charm and sense of humour to attempt to impress any woman, especially Annie, his colleague and later boss. Murphy was previously married with a young daughter, in Northern Ireland. There, his family were taken hostage and he was forced to make a choice; either carry a bomb and blow himself up in a local barracks, or have his daughter killed.

He originally chose the first option but when he got to the barracks he couldn't go through with detonating a bomb that would kill a hundred people. When he got back to the house, he found that they had slit his daughter's throat and that his wife had been forced to watch. His decision affected almost everything he does in life. He reflects at intervals, and remarks that he received "a nice medal" for "saving" so many lives, by making such a sacrifice. Yet, he still feels responsible for his daughter's death.

== Cast ==
- D.S. Tommy Murphy – James Nesbitt
- D.C.S. Edward Rees – Michael Feast (Series 3)
- D.C.S. John Atwood – Robbie Gee (Series 5)
- C.S. Ken Bowry – Ian Redford (Series 5)
- D.C.I. Derek Warren – Francis Magee (Series 4)
- D.I. Annie Guthrie – Claudia Harrison (Series 1)
- D.I. Hilary Clark – Sarah Berger (Series 2)
- D.S. Paul Allison – Owen Teale (Series 3)
- D.S. Mitch Kershaw – Tim Dantay (Series 5)
- D.C. Alan Carter – Del Synott (Series 1–2)
- D.C. Michael Ollington – Shaun Dooley (Series 3)
- D.C. Kim Goodall – Andrea Lowe (Series 5)
- D.C. Jackie Cole – Jessica Oyelowo (Series 5)
- Fr McBride – Mark Benton (Series 1–2)

== Episode list ==
=== Series overview ===
Series	Episodes	Originally released	
Series	Episodes	First released	Last released
1	5	24 September 2001	19 May 2003
2	6	10 May 2004	14 June 2004
3	6	26 May 2005	30 June 2005
4	3	27 August 2006	29 August 2006
5	3	1 October 2007	3 October 2007

=== Series 1 (2001–2003) ===
No. overall	No. in series	Title	Directed by	Written by	Original release date	UK viewers (millions)
1	1	"Pilot"	John Strickland	Colin Bateman	24 September 2001	7.48m
A team of undertakers are moonlighting as diamond thieves, and the bodies are stacking up. Murphy infiltrates the group and discovers a somewhat sinister connection with Japanese heroin dealers. Meanwhile, the team's leader, Hatcher, is planning the most audacious heist yet. Murphy has to hold his nerve in an epic final showdown.
2	2	"Electric Bill"	Peter Lydon	Colin Bateman	28 April 2003	6.23m
Murphy is sent undercover into a prison, in an attempt to draw out of Richard Mooney (Kevin Doyle) a confession for several murders, and to find the location of a missing woman. He is painted as an international terrorist as his cover. Mooney is released after no conclusive evidence is found, and this leads to a finalé, filmed at Biggin Hill Airport. The killers' family are ready to board a plane and escape, but Murphy arrives just in time to exercise justice.
3	3	"Manic Munday"	Peter Lydon	Colin Bateman	5 May 2003	5.25m
Micky Munday, a world-renowned snooker player is being blackmailed to fix snooker matches. Murphy and his colleague Annie go undercover in an attempt to protect the player and find the criminals masterminding the scam. Along the way, Murphy's wife reappears and turns out to be the current partner of Munday's opponent in the final.
4	4	"Reunion"	Maurice Phillips	Phil Charles	12 May 2003	5.50m
London's stereotypically bloody culture is explored, as Murphy goes undercover to investigate rivalry, warfare and murders occurring between local club owners. Annie is again drawn into the mix, and together, she and Murphy discover the true culprits and those responsible for the killings.
5	5	"Kiss and Tell"	Menhaj Huda	Scott Cherry	19 May 2003	5.08m
Murphy has the opportunity to practice his charm, as he is required to join an exclusive sports centre, doubling as a meeting place for unfaithful adults, in an attempt to track down the instigators of scams, deals and money laundering operations. During his adventure, he meets a number of beautiful women, all potentially responsible, and the men who are suffering as a result.

=== Series 2 (2004) ===
No. overall	No. in series	Title	Directed by	Written by	Original release date	UK viewers (millions)
6	1	"Jack's Back"	Brian Kirk	Colin Bateman	10 May 2004	6.24m
A West End serial killer is on the loose, and it is Murphy's job to track him or her down. The case takes on a new dimension for the detective, however, when tragedy strikes close to home.
7	2	"Bent Moon on the Rise"	Brian Kirk	Tony McHale	17 May 2004	5.07m
A promising young officer commits suicide, and Murphy is assigned to investigate.
8	3	"Ringers"	Ed Fraiman	Stephen Brady	24 May 2004	5.20m
Murphy is asked to be part of an Interpol investigation, to infiltrate a car ringing gang. He is paired with a French officer, Benoit.
9	4	"Go Ask Alice"	Ed Fraiman	Colin Bateman	31 May 2004	5.33m
Murphy goes undercover in a biotech laboratory to investigate possible rumours of a chemical leak that may have killed a young child, and gets more than he bargains for.
10	5	"Convent"	Phillip John	Colin Bateman	7 June 2004	6.07m
Mysterious occurrences in a local convent prompt Murphy to go and investigate. However, the nuns are not guilty of anything more than taking part of a scientific experiment.
11	6	"The Group"	Phillip John	Colin Bateman	14 June 2004	6.07m
Murderers are being murdered. Coincidence or revenge? Murphy goes in to investigate, but when given the chance to exact a very personal revenge, his loyalties are tested.

=== Series 3 (2005) ===
No. overall	No. in series	Title	Directed by	Written by	Original release date	UK viewers (millions)
12	1	"The Goodbye Look"	Brian Kirk	Allan Cubitt	26 May 2005	5.29m
Gangland boss and cop killer Dave Callard wants a hitman, and Murphy is just the man for the job.
13	2	"Disorganised Crime"	Andy Goddard	Simon Donald	2 June 2005	5.31m
Murphy is recommended to some dangerous brothers. He gains quite a reputation for being a reliable killer.
14	3	"Strongbox"	Brian Kirk	Julian Perkins	9 June 2005	5.36m
Callard instructs Murphy to obtain counterfeit Euros, and he needs all his fingers if he is to be successful!
15	4	"Extra Mile"	Andy Goddard	Michael Crompton	16 June 2005	5.10m
Murphy begins to realise how big this case is. His life really does depend on it.
16	5	"Boys Night Out"	Richard Standeven	Allan Cubitt	23 June 2005	5.01m
Heroin from Afghanistan needs stopping, but events take a turn for the worse.
17	6	"Hard Boiled Eggs and Nuts"	Richard Standeven	Simon Donald	30 June 2005	5.32m
Callard is systematically destroying the forensic evidence against him. After so long investigating, Murphy can't blow it now, and has to act fast.

=== Series 4 (2006) ===
No. overall	No. in series	Title	Directed by	Written by	Original release date	UK viewers (millions)
18	1	"Exile"	Colm McCarthy	Allan Cubitt	27 August 2006	5.47m
Tommy is called back, from compassionate leave at his mother's side, to infiltrate the Johnstone brothers, exiled from Belfast to Leicester. A botched drugs deal provides the perfect 'in', and Murphy is once more in the centre of the action...
19	2	"Hare Trigger"	Colm McCarthy	Allan Cubitt	28 August 2006	5.83m
Murphy's cover looks like it is blown when a CPS report is lost and he returns to Belfast. However, only the younger Johnstone brother is aware of his true identity and flies to Belfast to exact retribution. Murphy turns the tables, denounces Johnstone as the grass who provided the 'in' for the drugs deal and the two look set to return to Leicester to prevent a deal going bad.
20	3	"Strike Out"	Colm McCarthy	Allan Cubitt	29 August 2006	5.75m
Murphy and Billy return to Leicester, but Billy soon strikes out on his own, attacking Drew's wife and banker in his quest to retrieve their money. Soon enough, a three-way confrontation is held between the brothers and Tommy, and, the case closed, Murphy returns to his Ma's side.

=== Series 5 (2007) ===
No. overall	No. in series	Title	Directed by	Written by	Original release date	UK viewers (millions)
21	1	"Food Chain (Part One)"	Colm McCarthy	Russell Lewis	1 October 2007	4.56m
Murphy is cover officer for Mitch, who has worked with him previously, and Kim, who Murphy himself trained, on a deep cover operation into identity theft in Norfolk. When the couple fail to contact him at an agreed time Murphy becomes anxious and finds that they have gone missing. Murphy infiltrates a group of people smugglers who he believes Mitch was working for on his own and meets their boss, Mark Baker. When Mitch's body washes up, Murphy fears the worst for his protégé.
22	2	"Food Chain (Part Two)"	Colm McCarthy	Russell Lewis	2 October 2007	4.81m
Murphy discovers that his initial contact into Baker's group, Milos, is using the people smuggling to import cocaine as a personal sideline and uses this to his advantage. On discovering that Kim had been held at an abandoned hotel that the group use to make pornographic films and had scrawled the word Car in her own blood on the wall, Murphy and his own cover officer, Jackie Cole, ride with another of Baker's group, Branko, to a brothel in Cardiff where Jackie's cover is blown. She shoots Branko but he gets away.
23	3	"Food Chain (Part Three)"	Colm McCarthy	Russell Lewis	3 October 2007	4.66m
Murphy discovers that his own cover is blown when he rings Baker and attempts to convince him that Branko is the problem. After questioning the brothel madam and the local driver whose name she gives him, Murphy finds Kim at Cardiff docks. A standoff with Branko leads to Murphy shooting him once but Kim grabs Murphy's gun from him and finishes Branko off. Kim is taken to hospital for psychiatric care and the group are rounded up by the police. However, the only person who prepared to testify against Baker commits suicide. Kim absconds from the hospital after Murphy tells her the CPS will not be pressing charges against Baker. Murphy goes to warn Baker that Kim is coming for him but Baker laughs off the suggestion that she could do him any harm. However, not long afterwards, Kim kills Baker and then arrives at the operations room armed and takes the Chief Superintendent hostage. Murphy tries to talk her out of killing him but Kim turns the gun on herself, shooting herself in the head. The last scene is of Murphy sitting in his car in tears and repeatedly pressing his gun to his head but unable to pull the trigger.
