= Nine Inches =

2011 novel by Colin Bateman

- First edition
- Author: Colin Bateman
- Language: English
- Series: Dan Starkey novels
- Genre: Crime, Dark comedy
- Publisher: Headline
- Publication date: 13 October 2011
- Publication place: United Kingdom
- Media type: Print (Hardcover)
- Pages: 416
- ISBN: 978-0-7553-7863-0
- OCLC: 751831107
- Dewey Decimal: 823.914
- Preceded by: Belfast Confidential (2005)

Nine Inches is the eighth novel of the Dan Starkey series by Northern Irish author, Colin Bateman, released on 13 October 2011 through Headline Publishing Group. Fellow crime author, Ian Rankin, recognised the book in The Scotsman as one of his "books of the year" 2011. It was also listed by author Nick Quantrill as one of his "Top 5 Books of 2011".

== Plot ==
The four-year-old son of Jack Caramac, a shock jock radio broadcaster and old friend of Dan Starkey, is kidnapped for one hour and returned unharmed. Starkey, now a self-styled "upmarket private eye", is hired to investigate the kidnapping and ascertain who might have been behind it – a significant task given the number of people offended by Caramac's illustration of the crime and corruption prevalent throughout Belfast. Starkey's investigations lead him to the Miller brothers, officially the Chiefs of Staff for the Ulster Volunteer Force, although viewed by Starkey as merely a group of Shankill Road thugs intent on peddling drugs across Belfast. The Millers have been attempting to evict a widow named Jean Murray from her house and Starkey intervenes, hoping his knowledge of their drug operation would dissuade any repercussions. Starkey's interference leads to Murray's house being burnt down with Jean still inside.

== Characters ==
- Dan Starkey; former well-known journalist turned private-eye. Starkey is currently living apart from his long-suffering wife, Patricia.
- Patricia Starkey; Starkey's estranged wife
- Jack Caramac; ex-journalist turned "shock jock" broadcaster
- The Millers; UVF's chiefs of staff, cocaine dealers and general gangsters
- Jean Murray; widow of a former gang member whose rivals were the Miller brothers
- Bobby Murray; one-legged son of Jean, leg shot by the Millers
- Tracey Caramac; wife to Jack and Starkey's old flame

== Reception ==
There are some politically incorrect trademark Bateman jokes, the best of them done in the worst possible taste, appalling acts of random and callous violence, and a genuine sense of menace, suspense and tension as Starkey, more by dumb luck than any great detective work, engineers a violent conclusion to sort out the bad guys and (accidentally) dispose of a major stash of coke (the drug not the soft drink this time) and a rather large amount of drug money.

— Mike Ripley, Shots

The novel received universal acclaim, with reviewers praising Bateman's ability to create a likeable anti-hero and his comedic voice.

Mike Ripley, reviewing for Shots magazine, did note that the similarities between this latest Starkey adventure and Bateman's more recent Mystery Man series appear to be quite significant, stating "there are [some] very scary similarities between Mystery Man – a paranoid, anally-retentive, hypochondriac solidly double-parked on the wrong side of Aspergers Street – and Starkey, not the least of which is their fondness for proprietary brands of confectionary". Ripley goes on to state that he found the ancillary characters to be a "splendid supporting cast" and that, of the novel as a whole, "once Nine Inches gets going... it turns into a dark, violent urban thriller". The novel was also reviewed by Maureen Carlyle for Shots, who opined that "if you can stand the extreme violence and the ripe language, this is a pacey tale, and you can't dislike Dan, no matter how hard you try".

Reviewing for The Daily Telegraph, Mark Sanderson stated, of Bateman, "the biggest mystery about Nine Inches, a tale of kidnap and general cack-handedness, is why widespread success continues to elude him". Erin Britton, reviewing for Book Geeks was particularly effusive in her praise, stating that she found the novel to be "another excellent, darkly humorous crime novel from Bateman". She found the dialogue to be "great", the story to be "well-paced" and the novel to be "intricately plotted". Of Starkey, she stated that "while Starkey couldn't really be described as a likable character in the most obvious sense – he has foibles upon foibles after all – he is certainly charismatic and a great deal of fun to observe". Britton stated also that while "there is plenty of violence, sectarian and otherwise", "the story is actually rather emotional and melancholy in places". She found that, overall "Nine Inches is another excellent crime novel from Bateman, involving plenty of action, intrigue, mystery and downright bonkers characters". The Morning Star's Mat Coward also praised the novel, stating that Nine Inches "might be Bateman's funniest book so far" and going on to state that "the way he twists the jokes into the plot and the characters, rather than just pasting them on top like a layer of marzipan, is an object lesson in how to write comic crime fiction".

The novel was well received in Ireland also. For The Irish Times, author Declan Burke stated that he found "the ex-paramilitaries Starkey encounters" to be "far more terrifying than those he outwitted when Bateman was writing during The Troubles". Burke found the novel to be "dotted with Starkeys blackly comic observations" and stated that "Nine Inches is an unsettling, breathless and very funny novel". The novel was also praised by Writing.ie with the reviewer finding that Starkey's "determination to have the last word or squeeze in one last quip is the hook that never disappoints" though states that "amid all the humour is a classic crime thriller plot". With respect to the story, the reviewer stated that "the plot twists and turns without ever leaving the reader behind; as with all Bateman books, the ending will always be a surprise without making any ridiculous leaps of logic. It will all make perfect sense" and concluding that "If you want a book that will keep you gripped and gripping your sides with laughter, look no further than Nine Inches".

Further afield, the novel was well received by Sue Turnbull, in a review for 666 ABC Canberra, an Australian radio station. Turnbull, who had not read any Bateman novels before, stated, after reading Nine Inches, that "boy was she impressed". Turnbull recommends the novel "even if you've missed the earlier titles", stating "it's fantastic!".
