= Tvangeste =

Russian/Canadian black metal band

- Origin: Kaliningrad, Kaliningrad Oblast, Russia (as of 2005 based in Niagara Falls, Ontario, Canada)
- Genre: Symphonic black metal
- Years active: 1996–present
- Labels: Valgarder, Worldchaos Production, Regiomontum Productions
- Members: Mikhail Chirva; Naturelle Chirva
- Past members: Edgar; Klaus; Nikolay Kazmin; Asmodey; Julia; Vano Mayarov; Viktoria Kulbachnaya; Max Naumov

Tvangeste is a Russian/Canadian symphonic black metal duo composed of husband and wife Mikhail "Miron" Chirva and Naturelle Chirva.

The band's name comes from Twangste (also spelled as Tuwangste, Tvankste or Twankste), an Old Prussian word meaning "Dam". Twangste was also the name of a small Old Prussian village roughly located at what is now the city of Kaliningrad (known as Königsberg until 1946) that was seized in 1255 by the Teutonic Knights. In the site of the settlement, the now-demolished Königsberg Castle was built. (The House of Soviets now stands on the former site of the castle.)

== Biography ==
Tvangeste was formed in 1996 in Kaliningrad, Russia, and its line-up at the time consisted of Miron Chirva, Edgar, Nikolay "Kok" Kazmin and Klaus. However, in the following year, Edgar and Klaus left the band and were replaced by Asmodey and Julia. In 1998 they released two demo singles, Thinking... (that would be later re-recorded and included in their debut album) and Blood Dreams. Asmodey and Julia would leave shortly after, being replaced by Viktoria Kulbachnaya (from Romowe Rikoito) and Vano Mayarov (also known as Vanoe Mayoroff or Mayorov). With this line-up, Tvangeste released their debut full-length in 2000, Damnation of Regiomontum, via now-defunct Norwegian record label Valgarder.

In 2001, Miron's then-girlfriend Naturelle joined the band, and in 2003 their second studio album, Firestorm, was released, via also now-defunct Japanese label Worldchaos Production. Polish musician Cezary Mielko worked as a session drummer on it. Also in 2003, Max Naumov joined the band, and Tvangeste became a quintet.

In 2005, Miron and Naturelle married and moved to Niagara Falls, Ontario, Canada, while the three remaining members decided to stay in Russia. Around the same time Miron also provided vocals for Israeli black metal band Arafel's second studio album, Second Strike: Through the Flame of the Ages.

Since 2006, Miron and Naturelle are working on Tvangeste's third studio album. Tentatively titled Satori (Japanese for "Illumination"), it was scheduled to be released via their own independent record label, Regiomontum Productions. Norwegian musician Jørn Øyhus served as a session drummer, and the orchestral instrumentation was provided by the City of Prague Philharmonic Orchestra, according to Miron. Having a long and convoluted production history, it currently has no set release date.

On 7 September 2016, the band announced on their official Facebook page the death of their former bassist/guitarist, Vano Mayarov.

== Discography ==
=== Studio albums ===
- Damnation of Regiomontum (2000)
- Firestorm (2003)

=== Demo tapes ===
- Blood Dreams (1997)
- Thinking... (1998)

== Band members ==
=== Current ===
- Mikhail "Miron" Chirva (Михаил "Мирон" Чирва) – vocals, guitars, orchestral arrangements (1996–)
- Naturelle Chirva (Натюрель Чирва) – keyboards, vocals, orchestral arrangements (2001–)

=== Former ===
- Edgar (Эдгар) – guitars (1996–1998)
- Klaus (Клаус) – guitars (1996–1997)
- Nikolay "Kok" Kazmin (Николай "Кок" Казьмин) – guitars (1996–2005)
- Asmodey (Асмодей) – drums (1997–1998)
- Julia (Юлия) – keyboards (1997–1998)
- Viktoria Kulbachnaya (Виктория Кульбачная) – keyboards (1998–2005)
- Ivan "Vano" Mayorov (Иван Майоров) – bass, guitar (1998–2005; died 2016)
- Max Naumov (Макс Наумов) – bass (2003–2005)

=== Session ===
- Cezary Mielko – drums (2003)
- Jørn Øyhus – drums (2014)
