= Titanic 2020: Cannibal City =

2008 young adult novel by Colin Bateman

- Author: Colin Bateman
- Language: English
- Series: Titanic 2020
- Genre: Crime, young adult
- Publisher: Hodder Children's
- Publication date: 19 June 2008
- Publication place: United Kingdom
- Media type: Print (Softcover)
- Pages: 306
- ISBN: 9780340944462
- OCLC: 271856764
- Preceded by: Titanic 2020

Titanic 2020: Cannibal City is the second novel of the Titanic 2020 series by Northern Irish author, Colin Bateman, published on 19 June 2008 through Hodder Children's Books.

== Plot ==
The novel is based in the year 2020 and aboard a new unsinkable cruise ship Titanic, named for the RMS Titanic. This novel continues where the previous left off, with much of the world's population having been destroyed by an incurable disease named the "Red Death".

Jimmy and Claire are on shore looking for stories for the ship's newspaper and in the course of events they miss the tender back to the ship. Claire manages to get back on board and Jimmy, having failed to do so, decides to travel down the coast to the ship's next port of call.

=== Characters ===
- Jimmy Armstrong – protagonist teenage stowaway, editor of the ship's newsletter
- Claire – daughter of the owner of the Titanic and friend to Jimmy

== Reception ==
What follows is an adventure thriller, with the emphasis on the adventure, of the highest calibre. The plotting was supremely interesting, taking me to places I certainly didn't expect – even to the slightly surreal by the end.

— John Lloyd, The Bookbag

The novel was well received by reviewers.

Simon Barrett, for Just Imagine, called the novel, "a fast-paced, emotionally charged adventure"; that he found Bateman's "cinematic descriptions, cliffhanging moments of danger and last minute reprieves as well as the central dynamic between the characters Jimmy and Claire make this book a compulsive read"; concluding "Cannibal City is a great sequel for young adult readers aged 9+. Readers who have read the first book will not be disappointed". Everyone's Reading, for the SLA, called the novel "an engrossing, futuristic tale which is absolutely impossible to put down". John Lloyd, for The Bookbag, praised Bateman's writing style; "so vivid, so sprightly, so lively"; his rendition of teenage interaction; "so sharp and dryly sarcastic"; and his character development; "I cannot think of any character being introduced to a novel as effectively". Lloyd concluded by awarding the novel a five out of five star rating, stating "for teens wanting a future, post-catastrophe epic, that has a twinge of borrowing from classic films but provides a most novel novel instead, I can think of no better purchase".
