= Damnation of Regiomontum =

Studio album by Tvangeste
- Released: 13 January 2000
- Recorded: TV4 Studios, Kaliningrad; June/September 1999
- Genre: Symphonic black metal
- Length: 51:47
- Label: Valgarder
- Producer: Alex A. and Tvangeste

Tvangeste chronology
Damnation of Regiomontum (2000)	Firestorm (2003)

Professional ratings
Review scores
Source	Rating
Metal.de	link

Damnation of Regiomontum is the debut album by Russian symphonic black metal band Tvangeste. It was released on 13 January 2000 via now-defunct Norwegian record label Valgarder, that was owned by Ásmegin member and multi-instrumentalist Marius Glenn Olaussen. Regiomontum (also Regiomonti or Mons Regius) was the Latin-language name for the now-demolished Königsberg Castle.

The track "Thinking..." was previously featured on their homonymous 1998 demo.

A music video was made for the track "From Nameless Oracle".

As with Firestorm, it is available for free download on Tvangeste's official website.

== Track listing ==
All lyrics are written by Miron Chirva; all music is composed by Tvangeste

No.	Title	Length
1.	"From Nameless Oracle"	12:59
2.	"Angel's Retreat"	8:30
3.	"Damnation of Regiomontum"	11:00
4.	"Thinking..."	8:54
5.	"Born to Be King of Innerself"	8:58
6.	"Outro" (instrumental)	1:26
Total length:		51:47

== Personnel ==
Tvangeste

- Mikhail "Miron" Chirva — vocals, guitar, orchestral arrangements
- Vano Mayorov — bass
- Viktoria Kulbachnaya — keyboards
- Nikolay "Kok" Kazmin — guitar

Session musicians

- Olaa — female vocals
- Anna — cello, violin
