= Crossmaheart =

1998 film by Henry Herbert, 17th Earl of Pembroke

Crossmaheart is a 1998 British drama film directed by Henry Herbert and starring Gerard Rooney, Maria Lennon and Enda Oates. It was based on the 1995 novel Cycle of Violence by Colin Bateman. The film was released as Dead Man's Girl on DVD in the US, but did not go on general release in the UK.

== Cast ==
- Gerard Rooney as Kevin Miller
- Maria Lennon as Marie
- Enda Oates as O'Hagan
- Des Cave as Sergeant Craig
- Seamus Ball as Father
- Paula McFetridge as Fiona
- Richard Orr as Dave Morrow
- Conleth Hill as Coulter
- Tim Loane as Reverend Rainty
- Alan McKee as Curly Bap
- Doreen Keogh as Mrs. Hardy
- John Keegan as Callaghan
- Peter Ballance as Johnny
- Catherine Brennan as Helen
- Patrick Fitzsymons as Galvin
- David Bateman as Drunk dancing on a table
