= Turbulent Priests =

1999 novel by Colin Bateman

- First edition
- Author: Colin Bateman
- Language: English
- Series: Dan Starkey novels
- Genre: Crime, Dark comedy
- Publisher: HarperCollins
- Publication date: 6 December 1999
- Publication place: United Kingdom
- Media type: Print (Softcover)
- Pages: 275
- ISBN: 978-0-00-225416-8
- OCLC: 42274978
- Dewey Decimal: 823.914
- Preceded by: Of Wee Sweetie Mice and Men (1996)
- Followed by: Shooting Sean (2001)

Turbulent Priests is the third novel of the Dan Starkey series by Northern Irish author, Colin Bateman, released on 6 December 1999 through HarperCollins. Bateman's usage of Rathlin Island (which he renamed "Wrathlin Island" in the novel) as the book's setting led to Bateman being invited to unveil a "Writer's Chair", commemorating writers of all origin and genre.

== Plot ==
The plot of this novel is based on Wrathlin Island, a small island north of mainland Ireland. Dan Starkey has been sent by Cardinal Daley, the Primate of All Ireland, to investigate reports that the Messiah has returned in the shape of a young girl, Christine, about to start school. Starkey has his wife Patricia and illegitimate child "Little Stevie" join him as he investigates the tiny dry community and meets considerable resistance from the defensive residents.

== Reception ==
The novel received fairly little coverage though was well received.

Writing for The Herald, Allan Laing praised the novels "black-as-two-in-the-morning humour and the high body count", naming these as two Bateman trademarks. In another review for The Herald, Dawn Kofie calls the novel "more than just a straightforward thriller", stating that it "combines the mundane and the bizarre with mordant humour". She goes on to say that "despite its unlikely premise, the book is an engaging, swiftly paced fusion of murder, sex, and religious fundamentalism, loaded with wry one-liners". Isobel Montgomery, reviewing for The Guardian, stated that "Bateman is an engaging comic writer who has created another snappy adventure for Starkey".
