= Murphy's Law (novel) =

2002 novel by Colin Bateman

- Author: Colin Bateman
- Language: English
- Series: Martin Murphy novels
- Genre: Crime, dark comedy
- Publisher: Headline
- Publication date: 4 November 2002
- Publication place: United Kingdom
- Media type: Print (Softcover)
- Pages: 345
- ISBN: 9780755302437
- OCLC: 53389672
- Followed by: Murphy's Revenge (2005)

Murphy's Law is the first novel of the Martin Murphy series by Northern Irish author Colin Bateman, published on 13 October 2011 through Headline Publishing Group. The novel is adapted from the television series of the same name, created by Bateman and starring James Nesbitt.

== Plot ==
The novel surrounds undercover Northern Irish policeman Martin Murphy. Murphy fails a professional assessment due to the murder of his young son by IRA terrorists, and is assigned to work in London. He is assigned a case investigating a North London funeral home, the proprietors of which are suspected diamond thieves.

== Development ==
The novel was written when Bateman realised that the amount of material he had written for the TV series of the same name exceeded what would be produced. Bateman decided to change the name of the protagonist from "Tommy" to "Martin" as "I wanted to be able to control the character if – as it turned out to be true – I was no longer writing the series and someone else decided to take it in a different direction".

== Reception ==
The novel was well received. Reviewing for The Observer, Anthea Lawson stated that "Bateman's writing is hard, fast and funny, and there's a slick sheen to the inevitable violence". Denise Wels, for Reviewing The Evidence, stated "black humour abounds in a plot about funeral directors that fair begs for comic asides"; commenting that "Bateman has created some nasty villains", specifically Hatcher, who she found to be "totally immoral and sadistic finding entertainment in the troubles of others whilst displaying the most touching filial affection for his own deplorable parent". Writer Michael Stone found Murphy to be "charming, witty and dangerous" with "almost Holmesian powers of observation", stating "he is a character with complex issues, but Bateman renders him so humanely we have no problem identifying with him". Stone goes on to state that he found that the writing "is never less than superb". He does comment that "some folks dislike the sudden changes of POV, and I agree that head-swapping can lead to confusion at times" though does go on to conclude that "life's too short to nitpick, and I have another Murphy book to read, Murphy's Revenge".
