= SOS Adventures =

Young adult novel series by Colin Bateman

- Ice Quake; Fire Storm; Tusk
- Author: Colin Bateman
- Country: United Kingdom
- Language: English
- Genre: Crime, young adult
- Publisher: Hodder Children's
- Media type: Print (Softcover)
- No. of books: 3

The SOS Adventures series is a trilogy of young adult novels written by Northern Irish author Colin Bateman, released between June 2010 and March 2011. The novels surround teenager Michael Monroe and his adventures with a team of international environmental rescue operatives, known as SOS. The first novel in the series was longlisted for the children's Northern Ireland Book Award 2010–11.

== Characters ==
- Michael Monroe – fourteen-year-old orphan and newest member of the SOS team.
- Katya – teenage member of SOS.
- Dr. Jimmy Kincaid – pop-star millionaire founder of SOS.
- Mr. Crown – SOS team member who specialises in combat.
- Bailey – SOS's helicopter pilot.
- Bonsoir – strategist and language expert for SOS.
- Dr. Faustus – SOS's surgeon.

== Ice Quake ==
Ice Quake
- Author: Colin Bateman
- Publication date: 3 June 2010
- Pages: 244
- ISBN: 9780340998861
- OCLC: 520726800

Ice Quake is the first novel of the SOS Adventures series by Northern Irish author, Colin Bateman, published on 3 June 2010 through Hodder Children's Books. It sets on Baring Island (aka Banks Island) in the Canadian Arctic. The novel was well received and longlisted for the children's Northern Ireland Book Award 2010–11.

=== Plot ===
Michael Monroe, a teenage orphan boy, accidentally burns down his boarding school, St Mark's Retreat, by setting a fire in one of the many disused fireplaces. As a result, he is expelled from his sixth school in as many years and leaves on the bus the next morning, to be handed over to the local education authority. During this journey, however, the driver loses control of the bus and drives into an icy lake. Monroe then proceeds, along with the head boy Vincent Armoury, to save the lives of the school's debate team, who were on their way to a competition, before they all drown. When Armoury is hit in the head during the operation, Monroe pulls him from the water, administers the kiss of life and passes out. Monroe's heroic effort in the rescue of twelve children results in him coming to the attention of Doctor Jimmy Kincaid, millionaire owner of a team named SOS, which engages in risky rescue operations on a worldwide scale.

Monroe's first mission is to search for the missing "Eden" satellite, which had been measuring greenhouse gases in the Earth's atmosphere. Deployment for the mission doesn't go to plan and Monroe ends up stranded in the Canadian Rockies with fellow teen-aged SOS member, Katya, who somewhat resents his presence on the mission. While trying to succeed where the adults have failed, the teenagers run into armed men, wolves and a twice-the-usual-size polar bear.

=== Ice Quake characters ===
- Jordan Nappaaluk – native of the area who goes missing
- Vincent Armoury – head-boy of St Mark's
- Rachael – SOS's resident teacher

=== Reception ===
The novel was well received. Kieran Fanning from the Inis Magazine called this novel the "adrenaline-racing, breath-taking adventure" and considered its strengths to be "the dialogue and the lively banter". Fanning found its "characters and relationship [...] too similar to Jimmy and Claire's from Titanic 2020", with an exception of "wisecracks and one-liners [...] with [Bateman's] trademark wit". The Clare County Library stated that the children of the area found its characters "clever, funny and very resourceful" and awarded the novel a score of ten out of ten.

== Fire Storm ==
Fire Storm
- Author: Colin Bateman
- Publication date: 7 October 2010
- Pages: 220
- ISBN: 9780340998878
- OCLC: 642284546

Fire Storm is the second novel of the SOS Adventures series by Northern Irish author, Colin Bateman, published on 7 October 2010 through Hodder Children's Books. Janet Clarke from the School Librarian magazine called the novel an "action packed thriller", finding it "fast paced and entertaining"; stating that the characters were plausible and the relationship between Michael and Katya was "relaxed" and "friendly".

=== Plot ===
The SOS team was founded by pop-star millionaire, Dr. Jimmy Kincaid, who founded the organisation to assist in environmental rescue on a worldwide scale. Within this organisation, an elite team known as the Artists, derived from Action Response Team, exist and Michael Monroe is promoted to this group, despite being SOSs newest member.

The novel takes place on the Indonesian island of New Ireland, where the missing scientist, Dr. Anna Roper, who is on the island doing "vital" research into both the rainforest and indigenous peoples, was last seen. The SOS team, including Monroe, set out to find her. However, the team encounter a series of earthquakes and volcanic eruptions on the island.

=== Fire Storm Characters ===
- Joe Kabui – fourteen-year-old Filipino boy whose father is killed by bandits.
- Dr. Anna Roper – missing scientist and the reason that the SOS team are on New Ireland; sister of Jimmy Kincaid.
- Tracker Mark – tracker.

== Tusk ==
Tusk
- Author: Colin Bateman
- Publication date: 3 March 2011
- Pages: 220
- ISBN: 9780340998885
- OCLC: 656778804

Tusk is the third novel of the SOS Adventures series by Northern Irish author, Colin Bateman, published on 3 March 2011 through Hodder Children's Books.

=== Plot ===
The SOS team was founded by pop-star millionaire, Dr. Jimmy Kincaid, who founded the organisation to assist in environmental rescue on a worldwide scale. Within this organisation, an elite team known as the Artists, derived from Action Response Team, exist and Michael Monroe is promoted to this group, despite being SOSs newest member.

Founder of SOS, Dr. Jimmy Kincaid, summons the Artists to his farm in the fictional Zambeziland savannah for some rest. Michael Monroe and Katya, however, are sent to join a team of unruly youths under the tuition of ex-commando Major Calvin Hunter; to both protect a member of his team, future King of England Peter Windsor, and to improve their survival skills.

=== Tusk characters ===
- Major Calvin Hunter – ex-commando and leader of the expedition.
- Peter Windsor – future king of England.
