= The Horse with My Name =

2002 novel by Colin Bateman

- First edition
- Author: Colin Bateman
- Language: English
- Series: Dan Starkey novels
- Genre: Crime, Dark comedy
- Publisher: Headline
- Publication date: 5 August 2002
- Publication place: United Kingdom
- Media type: Print (Hardcover)
- Pages: 281
- ISBN: 978-0-7553-0238-3
- OCLC: 59483211
- Dewey Decimal: 823.914
- LC Class: PR6052.A773 H67 2003
- Preceded by: Shooting Sean (2001)
- Followed by: Driving Big Davie (2004)

The Horse with My Name is the fifth novel of the Dan Starkey series by Northern Irish author, Colin Bateman, released on 5 August 2002 through Headline Publishing Group. Bateman wrote the novel while staying at the Fairyhouse Racecourse in County Meath.

== Plot ==
This novel follows Dan Starkey who is currently both unemployed and single. His estranged wife Patricia, after cancelling their counselling sessions with Relate, has entered into another relationship with someone called Clive and is currently living with him in the family home. Starkey receives a request from Mark Corkery, known as "The Horse Whisperer", to investigate racing entrepreneur Geordie McClean who is apparently not quite as clean as his name would suggest.

== Reception ==
Reading a Colin Bateman novel is like having a drink with an old friend. The experience may not solve your problems but it will give you a warm glow for as long as you're together.

— Ferdia Mac Anna, Irish Independent

The novel received little but positive coverage in the media.

Ferdia Mac Anna, writing for the Irish Independent, stated that she found the feel of the novel to be "weirdly familiar but oddly cosy" where "everyone is on the make in one way or another and the heroes are either losers or drunks or both", calling Starkey's journey a "roller-coaster ride". She does note that "on occasion, the witty one-liners and outrageous scenarios grow a tad obvious", however also states that "I would rather read Bateman than many critically-acclaimed works of serious literature". Mac Anna further goes on to state that "Bateman's great strength is that he satirises everything" and calling the novel "terrific entertainment and stylishly funny".

Author John Gaynard stated that he was "a little disconcerted by the "stand up comedy" aspect" of the novel, yet he "persevered" and "came across some genuine moments of comedy". He opined that Bateman "is the sort of writer you either love or hate" and awarded the novel four stars, out of five.
