= Shooting Sean =

2001 novel by Colin Bateman

- First edition
- Author: Colin Bateman
- Language: English
- Series: Dan Starkey novels
- Genre: Crime, Dark comedy
- Publisher: HarperCollins
- Publication date: 8 May 2001
- Publication place: United Kingdom
- Media type: Print (Softcover)
- Pages: 245
- ISBN: 978-0-00-651424-4
- OCLC: 46332304
- Dewey Decimal: 823.914
- Preceded by: Turbulent Priests (1999)
- Followed by: The Horse with My Name (2002)

Shooting Sean is the fourth novel of the Dan Starkey series by Northern Irish author, Colin Bateman, released on 8 May 2001 through HarperCollins. The novel was named by Hugh Macdonald as one of The Heralds "paperbacks of the week" in June 2001.

== Plot ==
Dan Starkey is employed by legendary film star, Sean O'Toole, who is looking to escape his type cast action hero career and move into directing movies. Unfortunately, O'Toole is making a movie based on an infamous IRA member, nicknamed "The Colonel", and events soon lead to Starkey once again struggling to both protect his wife Patricia and illegitimate child "Little Stevie", while also keeping himself alive and writing.

== Reception ==
With Dan Starkey, Bateman has created a character that is uncomfortably easy to identify with. Devoid of focus, direction or anything approaching ambition, Starkey is the ultimate slacker with attitude. And it is this very attitude that elevates Bateman above the current deluge of thriller/comedy writers. His ability to find humour in the most trying of circumstances is Bateman's trump card, and in Shooting Sean this ability is given carte blanche.

— Tom Grealis, RTÉ

The novel was well received, with reviewers praising Bateman's droll humour and attention to detail.

In a review for The Herald, Hugh Macdonald stated that, while written fiction is often humorous without ever being laugh-out-loud funny, "Bateman can and does make me laugh" and found the novel to contain "Sharp-edged humour with a touch of suspense". Sue Leonard, reviewing for Books Ireland, called Bateman "the master of the fast-paced improbable satire" and stated that Shooting Sean "is packed full of humour and specializes in one liners". Leonard went on to say that "as in other Bateman novels the plot is so much larger than life as to be totally unbelievable" however does state that "in the hands of such a skilful writer this adds to the fun". She further states that she loves "Bateman's work for its strong construction, sharp satirical writing and inventive characterization" as well as his "attention to detail, and witty observation".

RTÉ also reviewed the novel, with Tom Grealis stating that the novel was "a funny and highly entertaining tale of narcotics, terrorism and eh, moviemaking". He does mention that "one thing that has to be pointed out about Shooting Sean is that the plot becomes somewhat ridiculous in the latter stages", following this with "[Bateman's] decision to go for suspense over characterization certainly panders to the mainstream, but it is a pandering one cannot but enjoy". Grealis also concluded that he found the novel to be "engaging, funny and eminently readable". Writing for Scottish newspaper, the Southern Reporter, Fiona Scott stated that Bateman "has become an absolute favourite" and that "Shooting Sean is my favourite so far". She states that "Bateman's droll Irish wit is ideal for this storyline", calling the novel as a whole simply "hilarious". Reviewing for Sprout Lore, reviewer David V. Baker stated that Bateman "has a wicked sense of humour" and that he found the book to be "a gripping read which will leave you laughing and sad at the same time, a rare quality".
