= Titanic 2020 =

2007 young adult novel by Colin Bateman

- Author: Colin Bateman
- Language: English
- Series: Titanic 2020
- Genre: Crime, young adult
- Publisher: Hodder Children's
- Publication date: 19 July 2007
- Publication place: United Kingdom
- Media type: Print (Softcover)
- Pages: 352
- ISBN: 9780340944455
- OCLC: 132295374
- Followed by: Titanic 2020: Cannibal City

Titanic 2020 is the first novel of the Titanic 2020 series by Northern Irish author, Colin Bateman, published on 19 July 2007 through Hodder Children's Books.

== Plot ==
The novel is based in the year 2020 and follows a stowaway named Jimmy Armstrong and his journey on the brand new and purportedly "unsinkable" cruise ship Titanic.

Jimmys great-grandfather was on the original RMS Titanic and drowned when it sank. During a school trip Jimmy misses his chance to see the newly built Titanic and so decides to return later that night to take a look by himself. The ship leaves port at this point, making Jimmy an unwitting stow-away on the ship's maiden voyage from Belfast to Miami. Discovered by a crew member, Jimmy is brought before the Captain and, given their distance from shore, is ordered to work his passage on the ship's newspaper, the Titanic Times. At the same time, an incurable disease is quickly spreading around the world resulting in widespread rioting and panic.

=== Characters ===
- Jimmy Armstrong - protagonist teenage stowaway
- Claire - spoiled daughter of the owner of the Titanic
- Scoop - editor of the Titanic Times
- Jeffers - first officer of the Titanic
- Pedroza - chef of the Titanic
- Captain Smith - captain of the Titanic
- Dr Hill - on board doctor of the Titanic
- Mr Stanford - owner of the Titanic and Claire's father

== Development ==
The novel was originally based around a cruise ship named The Emperor of the Seas, after a ship that Bateman himself had been on.

== Reception ==
It has all the ingredients of a maritime escapade, including pirates, mutineers and desperate getaways that Colin Bateman, author and screenplay writer, describes in cinematic style.

— Simon Barrett, Just Imagine

In 2011, Titanic 2020 was selected as one of ten titles to be issued free as part of World Book Day in Laredo, Cantabria.

The novel was well received by reviewers.

Keith O'Sullivan, for Inis Magazine called Titanic 2020 Bateman's "most accomplished [Children's novel] to date". He further found that Bateman "convincingly develops the relationships between his central characters"; calling the "well conceived narrative": "innovative" in its storytelling, "subtle" in its cultural and literary references and adventurous in "the twists and turns in its plot". Simon Barrett, for Just Imagine, called it "an adrenalin-fuelled, fun adventure", calling the dialogue "witty" and finding that "the situational comedy is often of a black nature that will amuse young people". Barrett did comment that he "groaned when I read the title", although found that "any homage to the film is simply the starting point for Colin Bateman's imagination and fantastic story-telling". Author James Lovegrove, in a review for the Financial Times found that "this fast-paced ocean-going adventure never wallows in the doldrums".

=== Awards and nominations ===
The novel was short-listed for the 2008 Bisto Book of the Year Awards and the Bolton Children's Book Award in the same year. Titanic 2020 also won "Book of the Year" at the Rotherham children's writing awards.
