= County Down Spectator =

Northern Irish newspaper

The County Down Spectator and Ulster Standard is a weekly tabloid-sized newspaper based in Bangor, County Down, Northern Ireland, UK. It generally serves the area covered by the North Down and Ards council areas. It is published by Spectator Newspapers and comes in three versions, for Bangor, Newtownards and Holywood. From 1955 to 1983, the newspaper was edited by Annie Roycroft, the first woman in Ireland to be the editor.

The Bangor edition serves Bangor and Groomsport.

The Newtownards edition was previously known as the Newtownards Spectator with a different logo. It serves Newtownards, Comber and the Ards Peninsula.

The Holywood edition is an innovation, and is similar to the Bangor edition. Holywood stories had previously been covered in the Bangor edition.

== Awards ==
In 2008, the newspaper won the prize for the Weekly Newspaper of the Year at the annual Chartered Institute of Public Relations Press and Broadcast Awards for Northern Ireland.
