= Annie Roycroft =

Ireland's first female newspaper editor

Annie Stephens
- Born: Annie Roycroft; 2 May 1926; Bangor, County Down
- Died: 11 January 2019 (aged 92); Cork, Ireland

Annie Roycroft (2 May 1926 – 11 January 2019), was Ireland's first female newspaper editor, working for the County Down Spectator.

== Biography ==
Born Annie Roslyn Roycroft in Bangor, County Down, in May 1926 Roycroft was the fifth of six children born to Kerry woman Annie Stephens and her husband, Cork man Tom Roycroft. He had worked in the Royal Irish Constabulary which had taken him to County Down. Roycroft got her education with Bangor Central Public Elementary School and Technical College before going on to get a job with the local newspaper, the County Down Spectator in 1941. Roycroft began as a junior office assistant but showed a journalists instincts and learned journalistic skills by typing up the reports dictated by the newspapers journalists. She began submitting local news stories and in 1952 she was taken on as a journalist despite misgivings among the teams locally about a woman working in the field. She then took a break working as a clerk for North Down Rural Council before being asked to return as the editor for the Spectator. A member of the National Union of Journalists, so that she knew how to pay her journalists properly, Roycroft had a reputation of standing her ground during reporting of the Troubles. She left County Down and her role as editor in 1983 when she married Joe Stephens and eventually moved to Cork.

Roycroft was very involved in the Church of Ireland. She had been a Sunday school teacher from the age of 16. When she moved to Cork she turned her time to working with the church. Her husband died before her and Roycroft died in Beaumont, Cork in 2019. Roycroft wrote her memoirs, Memoirs of a Scribbler, in 1995. She is remembered in the book Bangor In The Eighties which is dedicated to her.
