= High jinks =

Scottish drinking game

High jinks was a popular 18th-century drinking game in Scotland. The game involved throwing a die, and if the caster got a bad score, they had to choose between drinking more alcohol or performing an undignified task.

The term "high jinks" is now commonly used to refer to any prank or frolic.
