= The Troubles in Crossmaglen =

Events in County Armagh, Northern Ireland (1970–1986)

The Troubles in Crossmaglen recounts incidents during, and the effects of, the Troubles in Crossmaglen, County Armagh, Northern Ireland.

During the Troubles, at least 58 police officers and 124 soldiers were killed by the Provisional IRA in South Armagh, many in Crossmaglen itself. Incidents in Crossmaglen during the Troubles resulting in two or more fatalities:

== 1970 ==
- 11 August 1970 - Samuel Donaldson (23) and Robert Millar (26), both Protestant members of the Royal Ulster Constabulary (RUC), were killed by a Provisional Irish Republican Army booby trap bomb attached to a car, near Crossmaglen.

== 1972 ==
- 16 July 1972 - James Lee (25) and Terence Graham (24), both members of the British Army, were killed in a Provisional IRA land mine attack on their armoured personnel carrier, on Carran Road, near Crossmaglen.
- 18 September 1972 - Edmund Woolsey (32), a Catholic civilian, was killed by a booby trap attached to his car, while two of his friends were injured. The car had been stolen a week earlier, and the RUC informed Woolsey that the car had been found abandoned at Glasdrumman, near Crossmaglen, County Armagh. The bomb exploded as Woolsey went to retrieve his vehicle. While not a member of the Official Irish Republican Army (OIRA), Woolsey was known to the OIRA and socialised in similar circles, something which double agent Kenneth Littlejohn knew. At the time, the OIRA suspected that Littlejohn had planted the bomb to kill Woolsey, who he suspected was a member of their organisation.

== 1973 ==
- 5 May 1973 - John Gibbons (21), Terence Williams (35) and William Vines (37), all members of the British Army, were killed by a Provisional IRA booby trap bomb while on foot patrol near Crossmaglen.

== 1974 ==
- 16 March 1974 - Roy Bedford (22) and Philip James (22), both members of the British Army, were shot and killed by IRA snipers while on foot patrol at Moybane, near Crossmaglen.
- 13 August 1974 - Dennis Leach (24) and Michael Southern (19), both members of the British Army, were killed in an IRA remote-controlled bomb attack on their hilltop observation post at Drummuckavall, near Crossmaglen.
- 6 November 1974 - Stephen Windsor (26) and Brian Allen (20), both members of the British Army, were shot and killed by an IRA sniper while on foot patrol in Crossmaglen.

== 1975 ==
- 22 November 1975 - James Duncan (19), Peter McDonald (19) and Michael Sampson (20), all members of the British Army, were shot and killed during an IRA gun attack on their observation post in the Drummuckavall Ambush.
- 19 December 1975 - Trevor Brecknell (35), Patrick Donnelly (24) and Michael Donnelly (14), all civilians, were shot and killed during a gun and bomb attack on Donnelly's Bar, Silverbridge, near Crossmaglen. It was carried out by the Ulster Volunteer Force. The attack has been linked to the Glenanne gang.

== 1978 ==
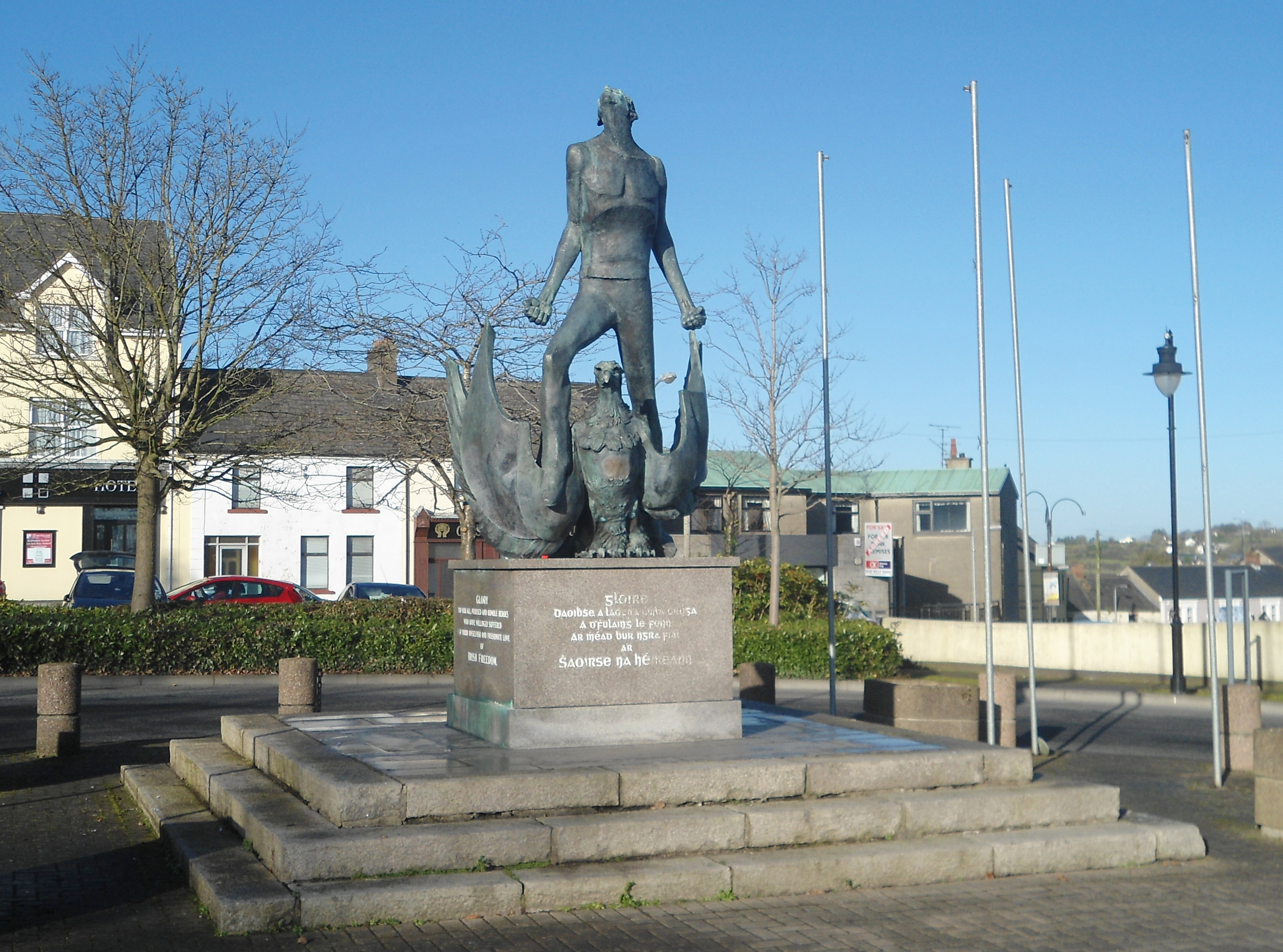
- Republican Memorial, Crossmaglen, unveiled in 1979
  17 June 1978 - William Turbitt (42) and Hugh McConnell (32), both Protestant members of the RUC, were shot by the IRA while on mobile patrol near Crossmaglen. McConnell was killed at the scene, but Turbitt was kidnapped. The next day, a Catholic priest (Fr. Hugh Murphy) was kidnapped in retaliation but later released after appeals from Protestant clergy. The body of Turbitt was found on 10 July 1978. In December 1978 three RUC officers were charged with kidnapping the priest and were also charged, along with two other officers, of killing a Catholic shopkeeper in Ahoghill on 19 April 1977.
- 21 December 1978 - Graham Duggan (22), Kevin Johnson (20) and Glen Ling (18), all members of the British Army, were shot and killed by the IRA from a passing van while on foot patrol at Crossmaglen.

== 1979 ==
- 03 June 1979 - Stanley Hanna (47) and Kevin Thompson (22), both Protestant members of the RUC, were killed by an IRA land mine while on foot patrol near Cullaville, near Crossmaglen.

== 1983 ==
- 13 July 1983 - Patrick Mackin (37) and Eamon McMahon (35), both Catholic civilians, were found dead in their car having been shot by the Irish National Liberation Army in Glassdrumman, near Crossmaglen,

== 1986 ==
- 22 May 1986 - Andrew French (35), a member of the British Army and David McBride (27), a Protestant and William Smyth (25), a Catholic, members of the RUC, were killed by an IRA remote-controlled bomb hidden in a ditch, which was detonated when their joint foot patrol passed near Crossmaglen.
- 9 July 1986 - Carl Davies (24) and Mitchell Robert Bertram (20), both members of the British Army, were killed by an IRA remote-controlled bomb hidden in a car and trailer which was detonated when their foot patrol passed near Crossmaglen.

== See also ==
- Provisional IRA South Armagh Brigade
- South Armagh Sniper (1990–1997)
