= Divorcing Jack =

- Directed by: David Caffrey
- Written by: Colin Bateman
- Starring: David Thewlis; Jason Isaacs; Laura Fraser; Robert Lindsay; Richard Gant; Rachel Griffiths
- Production companies: BBC Films; Winchester Films
- Distributed by: Mosaic Movies
- Release date: 2 October 1998 (United Kingdom)
- Running time: 110 minutes
- Country: United Kingdom
- Language: English
- Budget: £3 million
- Box office: £0.5 million

Divorcing Jack is a 1998 satirical black comedy. The plot is set around the Northern Irish reporter Dan Starkey who gets entangled in a web of political intrigue and Irish sectarian violence, at the same time as Northern Ireland is set to elect a new Prime Minister. Writer Colin Bateman adapted his own 1995 book as the screenplay.

== Plot ==
Northern Irish columnist Dan Starkey and American journalist Charles Parker are sent out to cover the upcoming elections, in which the charismatic, former victim of the war, Michael Brinn seems the obvious winner, campaigning on a platform of disarmament and peace between the warring factions in Northern Ireland. Starkey, however, is not impressed with Brinn's promises, believing he has heard it from politicians before.

Before this, however, Starkey is caught cheating on his wife Patricia with Margaret, a young art student. Patricia goes to her parents' house to get some time away, while Starkey keeps seeing Margaret. While at Margaret's, Starkey receives a tape of classic composers from her. He also makes the startling discovery that Margaret's former boyfriend is the feared terrorist Patrick "Cow Pat" Keegan. Later, when Starkey returns to Margaret's apartment after having bought pizza, he finds Margaret dying, bloody and molested. Her final words are divorce and Jack. Starkey then hears the front door open. He runs out to attack the intruder, thinking it is the murderer returning. The result is that he kicks Margaret's mother, who had come by to visit, down the stairs, killing her.

The next day, Starkey and Parker visit Brinn for an exclusive interview. While at Brinn's residence, it is revealed that Margaret is the daughter of an old friend of Brinn, a man who is also a prominent politician in Brinn's party. Starkey and Parker leave, but are attacked by Protestant paramilitaries on the way. Starkey explains it as a random act of violence, but Parker begins to suspect something is not right.

Later, when Starkey attempts to call Patricia, he hears her being kidnapped on the other end of the line. When the police suspect Starkey for the murder of Margaret and her mother, as well as the kidnapping of Patricia, Starkey is forced to tell the entire story to Parker. Parker reluctantly agrees to help Starkey.

After some research, Parker finds out that Margaret had an old friend named Jack and that this man might be the Jack Margaret talked about as she died. Starkey goes to visit him, only to find that he is a dead end. Starkey also gets himself shot at by paramilitaries that night, but he is saved by Lee Cooper, a nurse-by-day, stripper-by-night. While Starkey is at Cooper's apartment, she plays a piece of classic music, by the Czech composer Antonín Dvořák. Starkey realises that Margaret's last words were not divorce Jack, but rather an attempt to say the name of the composer on the tape Starkey had been given earlier, a tape that he had now sold to a street-vendor.

Following this, Starkey goes to a restaurant to meet Parker. However, it turns out that Parker has been held hostage by Keegan and his goons, and that the meeting was set up to trap Starkey. Starkey and Parker are taken to a council block Keegan controls, where Keegan threatens to kill Parker unless Starkey hands over the tape. Since Starkey does not have the tape, Keegan kills Parker. Keegan then threatens to kill Starkey's wife Patricia, who had been kidnapped by him earlier, unless Starkey can give him the tape. Starkey then reveals that he had the tape, but that he sold it to a street-vendor. This does not seem to be satisfactory for Keegan, but luckily for Starkey, he and his wife are saved in the last minute by Cooper, who storms in dressed as a nun wearing guns.

Starkey goes to the street-vendor to find the tape, only to find that it has been sold to a priest. Starkey goes to visit the priest, listens to the tape with him, and finds that it is a recording of Brinn admitting to having planted the bombs in the terrorist attack he claims to have been a victim of. Starkey mails the tape to Margaret's apartment, before he is again taken by Keegan's goons. Keegan orders Starkey to take the tape to a valley where Brinn will pay a ransom to have the tape delivered to him. The next morning, Keegan, Brinn, and Starkey meet. Keegan gives Brinn the tape in a tape recorder, while Brinn hands over the money in a briefcase. As the two drive away, Starkey is left to see them both get blown up. The tape recorder and the briefcase were both rigged with explosives.

A British civil servant urges Starkey not to print his story, fearing for the consequences if the truth about Brinn gets out. Starkey, however, decides to print it anyway and returns to his wife.

== Cast ==
- David Thewlis as Dan Starkey
  - Adam Black as Young Starkey
- Rachel Griffiths as Lee Cooper
- Jason Isaacs as Cow Pat Keegan
- Laura Fraser as Margaret
- Laine Megaw as Patricia Starkey
- Richard Gant as Charles Parker
- Robert Lindsay as Michael Brinn
- George Shane as Woods
- Alan McKee as Mouse
- Brian Devlin as Dans' work mate
- Sean Caffrey as Joe
- Bronagh Gallagher as Taxi Driver
- Kitty Aldridge as Agnes Brinn
- Simon Magill as Starkey's Brother

== Reception ==
The film grossed £462,567 ($0.8 million) in the United Kingdom.

In a review for Eye for Film, Angus Wolfe Murray wrote, "The film starts well and slowly loses credibility. The American and the nurse are superfluous to requirements. David Caffrey cannot judge the gap between black humour and white farce. Murder isn't a joke unless the style is established from the start. Jack wants it both ways, thriller tough and funny ha-ha. Although consistently entertaining, it ends up an innocent death short of a good laugh."

== Awards and nominations ==
- Fantasporto
  - Won Critics' Award
  - Won Directors' Week Award - Best Screenplay
- British Independent Film Awards
  - Nominated for Best Performance by a British Actor in an Independent Film - David Thewlis
