= Tim Dantay =

British actor

Timothy Dantay (born 1963) is a British actor who was born in Southern Rhodesia (now Zimbabwe) and brought up in the Lake District.

== Filmography ==
Year	Title	Role	Notes
1987–1988	Brookside	Robber / Gang Leader	4 episodes
1989–1991	Making Out	Ray	21 episodes
1990	All Creatures Great and Small	Phil	Episode: "Knowin' How to Do It"
1994	The Trial of Lord Lucan	Billy Edgson	
1995	Pie in the Sky	D.I. Walker	S2 E7 'Swan In His Pride'
1996	The Bill	Alan Bowles: Head Doorman	S13 E125 'Force'
1996	Hollyoaks	Vinnie Williams	2 episodes
1997	Police 2020	DI Brian Sagar	
1998–2002	Playing the Field	Dave Powell	25 episodes
1998–2008	Coronation Street	Building Site Foreman / Neil Flynn	7 episodes
2002	I'm Alan Partridge	John, the builder	4 episodes
2005	Bleak House	Robert Rouncewell	2 episodes
2007	Murphy's Law	D.S. Mitch Kershaw	Episode: "Food Chain; Part 1"
2008	Fast Track: No Limits	Neubeck	
2008	Summer	Woody	
2008	The Crew	Steady George	
2009	The Diary of Anne Frank	Mr Kugler	5 episodes
2011	32 Brinkburn Street	Billy Lamb	4 episodes
2011	Powder	Tad Brill	
2012	Boys on Film 8: Cruel Britannia	Martin	(segment "Nightswimming")
2014	Vera	DC Mark Donovan	Episode: "Death of a Family Man"
2015	Everest	John Taske	
2015–2018	EastEnders	Stephan Franklin	6 episodes
2016–2022	Jamie Johnson	Mike Johnson	Main role
2019–present	Brassic	Vinnie's Dad	8 episodes

== Theatre work ==
- Four Nights in Knaresborough (UK tour, 2001)
