= Firestorm (Tvangeste album) =

Studio album by Tvangeste
- Released: 1 September 2003
- Recorded: Selani Studios, Poland; 2001/2002
- Genre: Symphonic black metal
- Length: 44:32
- Label: Worldchaos Production
- Producer: Szymon Czech and Tvangeste

Tvangeste chronology
Damnation of Regiomontum (2000)	Firestorm (2003)

Professional ratings
Review scores
Source	Rating
Metalstorm	link

Firestorm is the second studio album by Russian symphonic black metal band Tvangeste. It was released on 1 September 2003 via now-defunct Japanese record label Worldchaos Production. It is available in two formats: the usual jewel case CD and the digipak, which contains different cover art and a radio edit of the song "Under the Black Raven's Wings" as a bonus track.

Most of the album's lyrics were written by Russian poet Alexander Marchenko.

A music video was recorded for the track "Under the Black Raven's Wings". "Birth of the Hero" would be included on the soundtrack of the 2009 video game Brütal Legend.

The album can be downloaded for free on Tvangeste's official website.

== Track listing ==
All lyrics are written by Alexander Marchenko (except where noted); all music is composed by Tvangeste

No.	Title	Length
1.	"Introduction" (instrumental)	0:42
2.	"Under the Black Raven's Wings"	5:54
3.	"Birth of the Hero"	5:46
4.	"Fire in our Hearts"	5:59
5.	"Perkuno's Flame"	6:44
6.	"Godless Freedom" (Miron Chirva)	5:37
7.	"Storm" (Miron Chirva)	7:46
8.	"Tears Will Wash Off the Blood from My Sword" (Vladimir Zgursky)	6:18
Total length:		44:32

Digipak re-issue bonus track
No.	Title	Length
9.	"Under the Black Raven's Wings" (radio edit)	4:09

== Personnel ==
Tvangeste

- Mikhail "Miron" Chirva — vocals, guitar, orchestral arrangements
- Naturelle Chirva — keyboards, vocals, orchestral arrangements
- Vano Mayorov — bass
- Viktoria Kulbachnaya — keyboards
- Nikolay "Kok" Kazmin — guitars

Session musicians

- Cezary Mielko — drums, percussion
