= Duty editor =

A duty editor (also known as editor of the day) in news media, such as radio and television, is a senior journalist with editorial and managerial duties. A duty editor acts as an editor in the absence of the news editor (compare: duty officer). In many cases, it is the duty editor who takes most day-to-day decisions. The duty editor is responsible for planning and running scheduled and breaking news broadcasts, gives assignments to reporters and acts as their supervisor, and decides which content that shall be broadcast, how it shall be presented and in what order.

In large media organizations such as the BBC or other public broadcasters, the actual editor or news editor is often a senior manager who is seldom directly involved in day-to-day decisions, having delegated editorial duties to a senior journalist. The duty editor is usually the most senior journalist who is present at a news desk. There may be several duty editors on duty with different areas of responsibility; in the BBC, there is always a "home duty editor" and a "foreign duty editor" on duty, responsible for domestic and foreign news, respectively.
