= Divorcing Jack (novel) =

1995 novel by Colin Bateman

- First edition
- Author: Colin Bateman
- Language: English
- Series: Dan Starkey novels
- Genre: Crime, Dark comedy
- Publisher: United Kingdom HarperCollins; United States Arcade
- Publication date: 23 January 1995
- Publication place: United Kingdom
- Media type: Print (Softcover)
- Pages: 280 pp
- ISBN: 978-0-00-647903-1
- OCLC: 472952816
- Dewey Decimal: 823.914
- LC Class: PR6052.A773 D58 1995
- Followed by: Of Wee Sweetie Mice and Men (1996)

Divorcing Jack is the debut novel and first of the Dan Starkey series by Northern Irish author, Colin Bateman, released on 28 January 1995 through HarperCollins. The novel was recognised as one of the San Francisco Review of Books favourite "First books" of 1995–1996.

== Plot ==
Set in Belfast, Northern Ireland, the novel's events follow a turbulent period in the life of married, cynical and usually drunk journalist Dan Starkey. Dan's wife Patricia leaves him after a drunken party in which he kisses a student called Margaret. What follows is a darkly comical tale of murder and mystery.

== Film adaptation ==
The novel was adapted by Bateman himself. Directed by David Caffrey the 1998 film stars David Thewlis.

== Reception ==
Colin Bateman's Belfast-set thriller is a roller-coaster ride of a book that will keep you chuckling and horrified in equal measure from start to finish.

— Christina Hardyment, The Independent

The novel was generally well received by critics, with praise going to Bateman's humour and wit and his creation of a likeable "anti-hero" and most criticism concerning the novel's plot.

Kirkus Reviews stated that while "there's nothing special about the story", "Bateman ... has struck gold the first time out with his mordant, loquacious hero and his ruined landscape", stating in conclusion that "the promised sequel can't arrive too soon". Publishers Weekly took a similar stance, stating "the plot machinations are formulaic", yet tempering this by stating that "what makes this tale stand out, however, is the wit and charm of its protagonist", and that "the intricate Irish politics are gracefully rendered, and Bateman's wry take on the gritty Belfast landscape adds an appealingly light touch", concluding again that "the author apparently has another Dan Starkey novel in the works; that's very good news indeed". The novel was well received by Christina Hardyment of The Independent, who stated that "James Nesbitt's almost edible Irish voice enhances the wit and wizardry of a story that is as much a mystery novel as a romance, and which deservedly won the Betty Trask Award in 1994".

In a review for RTÉ, reviewer Tom Grealis was a little more critical of the novel, stating "plot-wise, Divorcing Jack is far from impressive. Over-stretched and under-thought, the improbable story-line limps from chapter to chapter looking for a thread which will haul it to safety". Grealis does state, however, that "in Dan Starkey, Bateman has created a gloriously irreverent and amusing (anti) hero" and concludes "if you can forgive the hopelessly improbable plot, 'Divorcing Jack' remains a solid and humorous debut".

=== Awards and nominations ===
The novel was awarded the 1994 Betty Trask Prize by the Society of Authors, for the best debut by a writer under the age of 35.
