= Donal McKeown =

Roman Catholic bishop

The Most Reverend Dónal McKeown STL MBA
- Bishop Emeritus of Derry
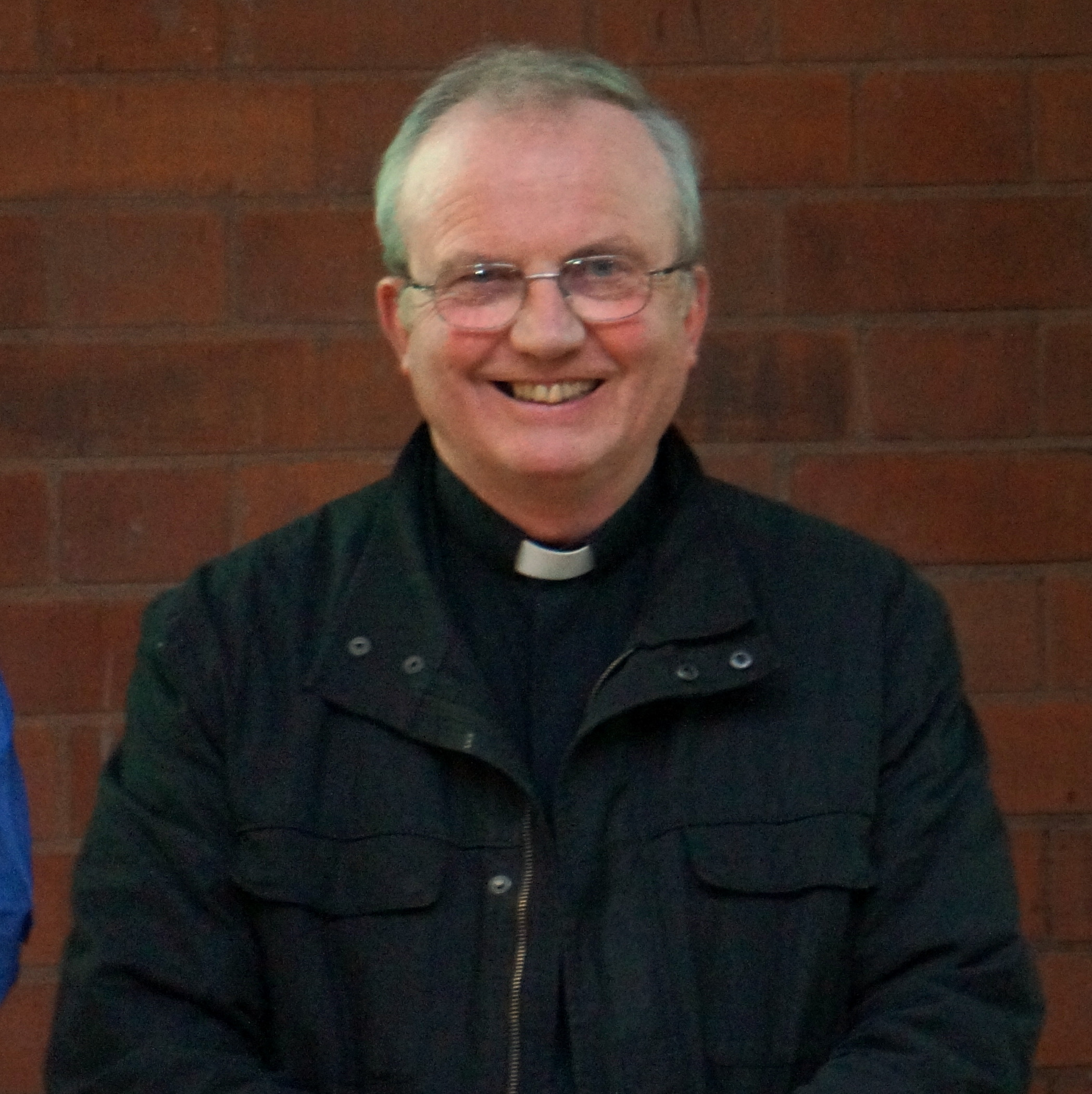
- McKeown in 2014
- Church: Roman Catholic
- Diocese: Derry
- Appointed: 25 February 2014
- Installed: 6 April 2014
- Term ended: 20 September 2026
- Predecessor: Séamus Hegarty
- Successor: Michael Router
- Previous posts: Apostolic Administrator of Down and Connor; Auxiliary bishop of Down and Connor; Titular bishop of Cell Ausaille; President and Dean of St Malachy's College

Orders
- Ordination: 3 July 1977 by William Philbin
- Consecration: 29 April 2001 by Patrick Walsh

Personal details
- Born: 12 April 1950 (age 76) Randalstown, County Antrim, Northern Ireland
- Parents: James and Rose McKeown
- Education: Queen's University Belfast; Pontifical Gregorian University; University of Leicester
- Motto: Veritas in caritate (The Truth in Love)
- Coat of arms: Dónal McKeown's coat of arms

Dónal McKeown (born 12 April 1950) is a Roman Catholic prelate from Northern Ireland who served as Bishop of Derry from 2014 to 2026.

== Early life and education ==
McKeown was born in Belfast on 12 April 1950, one of four children to James McKeown and his wife Rose (née McMeel), and was baptised in St Patrick's Church, Donegall Street. He was brought up in Randalstown, County Antrim, where he played Gaelic football and hurling with Kickhams GAC Creggan.

McKeown attended primary school at Mount St Michael's Primary School, Randalstown, and secondary school as a boarder at St MacNissi's College, Camlough, between 1961 and 1968, completing his O-Levels and A-Levels with special distinctions in Modern Languages. Two of his teachers at St MacNissi's College were his future brother bishops, Anthony Farquhar and Patrick Walsh.

McKeown began studying for the priesthood at St Malachy's College, Belfast, in 1968, and obtained a bachelor's degree with honours in German and Italian from Queen's University Belfast. He taught English at a school in Dieburg, Germany, between 1970 and 1971, and subsequently worked as Northern Ireland correspondent for the Katholische Nachrichten-Agentur between 1971 and 1973.

McKeown completed a licentiate in sacred theology at the Pontifical Gregorian University, Rome, between 1973 and 1978, during which he also worked for Vatican Radio and as a correspondent for An Saol Mór, an Irish-language programme on RTÉ.

McKeown was ordained to the priesthood on 3 July 1977.

== Presbyteral ministry ==
Following ordination, McKeown's first pastoral assignment was as chaplain at Mater Infirmorum Hospital, before returning to Rome to complete his licentiate. He returned to the Diocese of Down and Connor in 1978, where he was appointed as a teacher at Our Lady and St. Patrick's College, Knock, while also serving as assistant priest in Derriaghy.

McKeown returned to St MacNissi's College in 1983, where he continued his involvement with youth ministry and was given responsibility for organising the annual diocesan pilgrimage to Lourdes.

He subsequently returned to St Malachy's College in 1987, where he taught and served as dean of the adjoining seminary, before succeeding Canon Noel Conway as president in 1995. During his presidency, McKeown completed a Master of Business Administration at the University of Leicester in 2000, specialising in educational management.

He has completed the Belfast Marathon on two occasions: as a priest with a team of 48 from Derriaghy in 1982, and as a bishop fundraising for a minibus for St Malachy's College in 2001.

== Episcopal ministry ==
=== Auxiliary Bishop of Down and Connor ===
McKeown was appointed auxiliary bishop-elect for the Diocese of Down and Connor and titular bishop of Cell Ausaille by Pope John Paul II on 21 February 2001, the first Irish bishop to be appointed in the third millennium. He was consecrated by the Bishop of Down and Connor, Patrick Walsh, on 29 April in St Peter's Cathedral, Belfast.

In response to a 2007 decision by Amnesty International to campaign for the legalisation of abortion in certain circumstances, McKeown supported the decision of Catholic schools in the diocese to disband their Amnesty International support groups, on the grounds that it would no longer be appropriate to promote the organisation in their schools.

It was reported in an article in The Irish News that the mention of McKeown as a possible successor to Walsh as Bishop of Down and Connor was actively opposed by some priests in the diocese, who regarded him as being "too soft" on the issue of integrated education. This opposition was branded a "Stop Donal" campaign.

McKeown also served as a member of the Irish Catholic Bishops' Conference, with responsibility for the promotion of Catholic education, youth ministry, university chaplaincies and the promotion of vocations. His interests include the interface between faith and the empirical sciences, and working with Catholic schools in Norway, Denmark, Lithuania, Poland and Germany.

McKeown also served as a member of the Irish Catholic Bishops' Conference and its committee on education, and chaired its committees on vocations and youth. He led the youth of the diocese to World Youth Day in 2002 and 2005, and also travelled to Rome alongise his brother bishops for their quinquennial visit ad limina in 2006.

McKeown is also a regular contributor on Thought for the Day on BBC Radio Ulster.

=== Bishop of Derry ===
McKeown was appointed Bishop-elect of Derry by Pope Francis on 25 February 2014.

He was installed on 6 April in St Eugene's Cathedral, Derry.

After his 75th birthday on 12 April 2025 Canon law requires all bishops to submit their resignation to the Pope at the age of 75. Bishop McKeown submitted his resignation on 12 April 2025. He celebrated the silver jubilee of his episcopal ordination almost exactly one year later

His resignation was accepted in July 2026 and his successor Michael Router was announced on the same day.

=== Apostolic Administrator of Down and Connor ===
Following the appointment of Noël Treanor as Apostolic Nuncio to the European Union on 26 November 2022, McKeown was announced as Apostolic Administrator of Down and Connor on 21 January 2023. He served in this role until the installation of Alan McGuckian, following his appointment as Bishop of Down and Connor on 2 February 2024.

Catholic Church titles
Preceded by Séamus Hegarty	Bishop of Derry since 2014	Succeeded by Incumbent
