= St Mary's Church, Belfast =

Roman Catholic Church in Belfast, Northern Ireland

Coordinates: 54°35′59″N 5°55′59″W

St. Mary's Church
- Saint Mary's Church, Belfast (Chapel Lane)
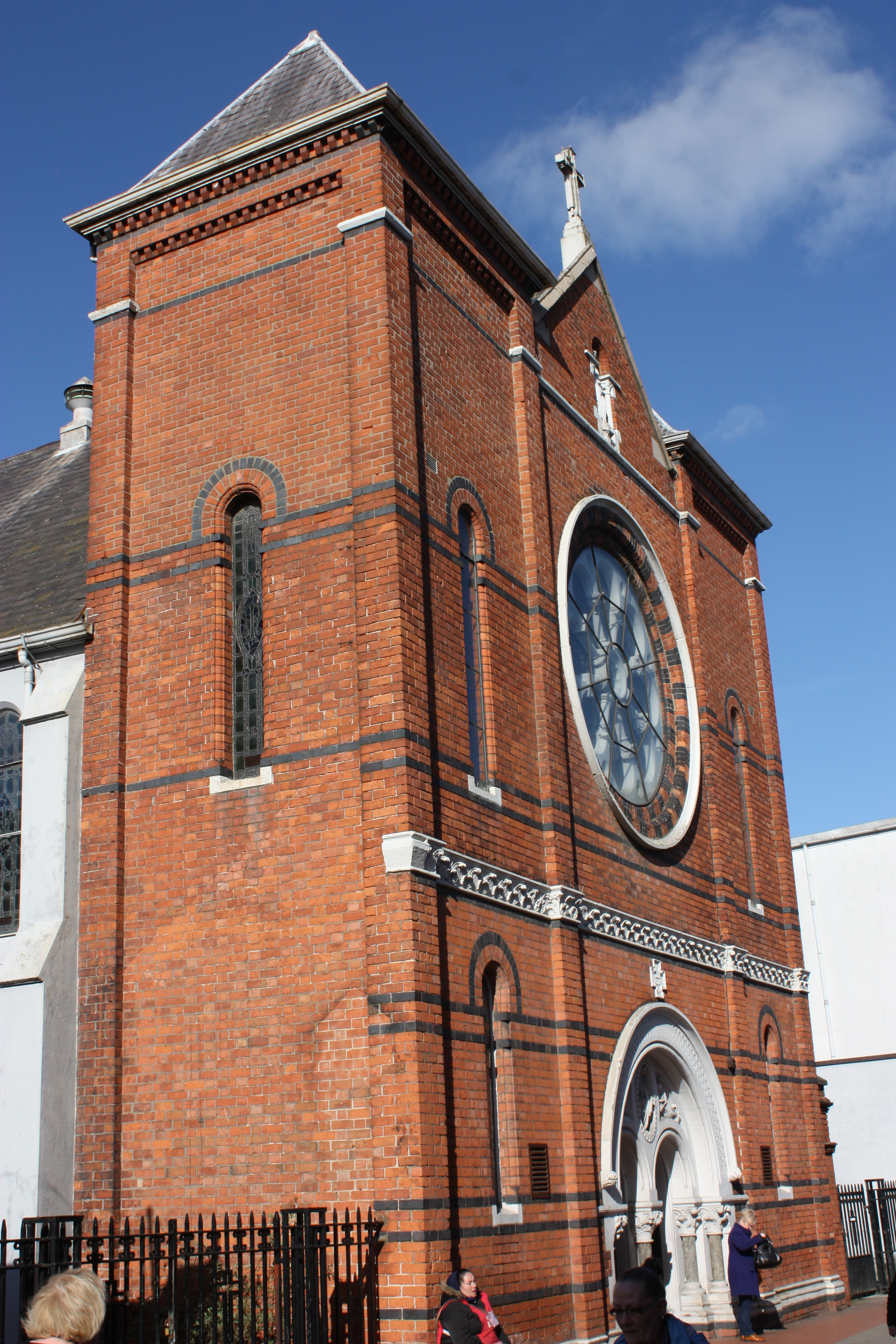
- St Mary's Church, Belfast

- Location within Northern Ireland
- Location: Belfast, County Antrim
- Country: Northern Ireland
- Denomination: Catholic
- Website: stmarysbelfast.org

Architecture
- Architect: John O'Neill
- Architectural type: Romanesque architecture
- Years built: 1782-1784

Administration
- Province: Armagh
- Diocese: Down and Connor

Clergy
- Bishop: Alan McGuckian

St. Mary's Church (Irish: Naoimh Eaglais Mhuire) is a Grade B-1 listed Catholic church located in Chapel Lane/Smithfield area of Belfast, Northern Ireland. A church was opened on this site in May 1784 and thus it is the mother church for the city of Belfast. At the time, it was the only Catholic church in the then town of Belfast after the relaxation of some of the Penal Laws. The church grounds contain an undistinguished grotto dedicated to Our Lady of Lourdes.

== History ==
In the census of 1782, 365 Catholics were recorded as living in Belfast. Following a collection from the local Church of Ireland and Presbyterian congregations, funds were donated to the building of St. Mary's Church.

The first Mass was celebrated on 30 May 1784 - a Sunday - by Father Hugh O’Donnell, the first Parish Priest of Belfast. In the opening ceremony, a company of the Irish Volunteers, led by Waddell Cunningham, lined the chapel yard and escorted Father O'Donnell into the building.

In 1813, the church's pulpit was donated by the Anglican Vicar of Belfast, Canon Turner, continuing the positive relationship between the Roman Catholic church and the local Protestant congregations. Later, in 1815, the first St. Patrick's Church was opened to accommodate the growing Catholic population of the city.

As Belfast's Catholic population grew after the famine, St. Mary's was deemed too small and thus architect John O'Neill was contracted to design a church big enough for the burgeoning congregation.

=== 1868 Reconstruction ===
Although he was originally contracted to improve the pre-existing church, John O’Neill's Romanesque design required the effective rebuilding of the late-18th century chapel. The completed church, which largely remains in place despite later internal changes, was brought forward to the street line and a smaller sexton's house from the 18th century was demolished.

In addition to the distinctive red brick Romanesque-style gabled front, the most significant changes in this effective reconstruction were the addition of five bays, a porch, a ninety feet high tower and the very distinct apsidal sanctuary.

=== Twentieth century ===
Renovation work with a new staircase, confessionals and sacristy with all the work undertaken by the Belfast-based architect Padraig Gregory commenced in the late 1930s. The 90ft, three stage belfy tower dating form 1868 was removed at this time.

It was planned to re-open the renovated church in May 1941 but the Belfast Blitz several days beforehand forced the cancellation of the re-opening by Bishop Daniel Mageean. This renovation was the occasion of a very fine history of the church and parish by Rev Patrick Rogers (priest). A new date stone was placed over the doorway in the form of a Potent cross stating; ‘FIDEM / SERVAVI / 1783 / 1868 / 1941’

In the Marian Year of 1954 a Grotto to Our Lady of Lourdes was established under the auspices of the then Administrator, Fr Bernard MacLaverty - an uncle of the Belfast novelist of the same name. The grotto was created in the gardens surrounding the church by Padraig Gregory.

To mark the bicentenary the sanctuary was renovated in 1983 with work by artist Roy Carroll, a favourite of Cahal Daly, much of this timber furniture was later removed after Daly's departure from the Diocese of Down and Connor.

In May–August 2017, the church underwent a substantial renovation work to repair the roof and walls, and to repave the grotto area.

== Present day ==
For almost forty years the church was served by clergy from the Mill Hill Fathers, the last of whom left in 2019. The current Parish Priest is Fr. Timothy Bartlett assisted by a range of retired clergy.

The church holds two masses a day from Sunday - Monday, and three a day on Friday and Saturday. The 6pm Mass on both Friday and Saturday is celebrated in the Irish language.
