= William Conway (cardinal) =

Irish cardinal (1913–1977)

His Eminence William Conway
- Cardinal, Archbishop of Armagh; Primate of All Ireland
- Church: Catholic Church
- Archdiocese: Armagh
- Appointed: 9 September 1963
- Term ended: 17 April 1977
- Predecessor: John D'Alton
- Successor: Tomás Ó Fiaich
- Other posts: Cardinal-Priest of San Patrizio (1965-1977)
- Previous posts: Titular Bishop of Neve and Auxiliary of Armagh (1958–1963)

Orders
- Ordination: 20 June 1937
- Consecration: 27 July 1958 by John D'Alton
- Created cardinal: 22 February 1965 by Paul VI
- Rank: Cardinal priest

Personal details
- Born: William John Conway; 22 January 1913 Belfast, Ireland
- Died: 17 April 1977 (aged 64) Armagh, Northern Ireland
- Buried: St Patrick's Cathedral Cemetery, Armagh
- Denomination: Roman Catholic
- Parents: Patrick Conway and Annie Conway (née Donnolly)
- Education: St Mary's Christian Brothers' Grammar School, Belfast
- Alma mater: Queen's University Belfast; St Patrick's College, Maynooth; Pontifical Gregorian University (DD)
- Motto: Praedicare Evangelium

William John Conway (22 January 1913 – 17 April 1977) was an Irish cardinal of the Roman Catholic Church who served as Archbishop of Armagh and Primate of All Ireland from 1963 until his death, and was elevated to the cardinalate in 1965. He was head of the Catholic Church in Ireland during the reforms of the Second Vatican Council.

== Early life and education ==
Conway was born in Dover Street, Belfast, on 22 January 1913 and baptised in St. Peter's Pro-Cathedral. He was the eldest of nine children. His father, Patrick Joseph Conway, was a house painter and ran a paint shop near Royal Avenue; his mother, Annie Donnolly, came from Carlingford on the Cooley Peninsula in the north of County Louth. He attended Boundary Street Primary School, St Mary's CBS (now St Mary's Christian Brothers' Grammar School, Belfast), Queen's University Belfast; St Patrick's College, Maynooth; and the Pontifical Gregorian University, Rome. He emerged with a doctorate in canon law summa cum laude tying for a gold medal with a German Jesuit.

== Priesthood ==
Conway was ordained for the Diocese of Down and Connor on 20 June 1937. After further studies in Rome in 1937–1941, he served on the staff of St. Malachy's College, Belfast, 1941–1942, teaching Latin and English. In 1942 he was appointed Professor of Moral Theology in Maynooth and of canon law the following year, holding both professorships until 1958. He was vice-president in 1957–1958.

Two of his brothers, alumni of St. Mary's CBS, also became priests of the Diocese of Down and Connor. Canon Joseph Conway was ordained in 1947 and taught at St. Malachy's College until his appointment as President of St. Patrick's College, Knock in 1967. In 1986 he became Parish Priest of Kircubbin and died in 2008. An even younger brother, Canon Noel Conway was ordained in 1957 and also taught at St. Malachy's College where he became president in 1983. In 1990 he became Parish Priest of Strangford.

== Episcopal career ==
Conway was appointed Titular Bishop of Neve and Auxiliary of Armagh on 31 May 1958, consecrated on 27 July 1958 in St Patrick's Cathedral, Armagh where he served under Cardinal John D'Alton. He was made Administrator of St. Mary's Church in Dundalk and at forty-five was the youngest Bishop in Ireland at the time. After D'Alton's death Conway was appointed Archbishop of Armagh and Primate of All Ireland on 9 September 1963 by Pope Paul VI.

Conway was the leading Irish participant in the Second Vatican Council, at which his peritus was future Archbishop of Armagh Cahal Daly.

On 22 February 1965 he was raised by Pope Paul VI to the cardinalate at the same consistory as his friend John Heenan of Westminster. Cardinal Conway was created and proclaimed Cardinal-Priest of San Patrizio.

== Pre-Troubles cardinalate ==
In the years after Vatican II, Cardinal Conway worked hard to implement the decrees of the council. Ireland was well ahead of other countries in introducing the vernacular into the Mass on 7 March 1965. Cardinal Conway marked the day by celebrating Mass in Irish in the Franciscan College in Gormanstown, County Meath.

He reorganised the Irish Bishops Conference, setting up several commissions such as Justice and Peace, Laity, Social Welfare. He was invited to Poland in 1966 to the celebrations to mark one thousand years of Polish Christianity, but he was refused a visa by the Communist government and could not attend.

== Cardinal Conway and the Troubles ==
Conway presided over the Irish Church at the outbreak of the Troubles and, as a native of Belfast and a priest of the diocese of Down and Connor, was well-placed to respond to the demands of the era. On 12 September 1971, after the introduction of internment, he and his fellow Northern bishops issued a statement in which they both criticised internment and denounced the Provisional Irish Republican Army (IRA) as "the small group of people who are trying to secure a united Ireland by the use of force". In a much-quoted phrase of the Cardinal's the statement went on to pose the question, "Who in their sane senses wants to bomb a million Protestants into a united Ireland?"

Styles of William Conway
- Reference style: His Eminence
- Spoken style: Your Eminence
- Informal style: Cardinal
- See: Armagh

Later that year, after the murder of an Ulster Defence Regiment (UDR) soldier by the IRA near Caledon, Cardinal Conway said: "This latest and most cruel murder will send a chill of horror throughout the whole community. The persons responsible for such a barbaric act have lost all sense of the sacredness of human life and have thereby become less than human." He was equally strong in his condemnation of loyalist paramilitaries who killed members of his diocese whose funerals he often attended.

In May 1974 when James Devlin, a well-known Gaelic Athletic Association player in County Tyrone, was killed along with his wife Gertrude, around 2,000 people attended their funerals. On that occasion Conway said: "In the past three days I have looked upon coffins of seven utterly innocent people who have been ruthlessly cut down. During the past week eleven people have been murdered, one a member of the security forces, the other ten all Catholics. One must raise one's voice to high heaven against this slaughter of the innocent, irrespective of the religion of the victim."

== Ecumenical relations ==
Conway was keen throughout his time as Primate of All-Ireland to develop and maintain good relations with the leaders of other Christian churches on the island. He enjoyed a particularly close friendship with his Church of Ireland counterpart as Primate in Armagh, George Simms. In 1973 Archbishop Simms invited Archbishop of Canterbury Michael Ramsey to lecture at the Refresher Course for Church of Ireland clergy. The visit took place from 30 April to 3 May and Simms arranged for Ramsey and Conway to meet. Conway held to the policy of church leaders acting together, so that they could best advance their cause for peace.

In the 2006 releases of Public Records from the year 1975 there exists a one-page note of a meeting between Harold Wilson, then British Prime Minister, and the leaders of the main Churches in Northern Ireland (Cardinal Conway, Archbishop George Simms, Temple Lundie, the Rev Harold Sloan, the Rev Donald Fraser). The background was the secret talks held between representatives of the Irish Republican Army (IRA) and Protestant clergy at a location in Feakle, County Clare, on Tuesday 10 December 1974. On 18 December 1974 the Protestant clergy met with Merlyn Rees, then Secretary of State for Northern Ireland, to report on their meeting with the IRA. These developments had led to an IRA ceasefire that began at midnight on Friday 22 December 1974 and was scheduled to end at midnight on 2 January 1975:

The Prime Minister said that he had been impressed by the earlier reference to children going out to parties again. Peace created its own dynamic. The Church leaders had planted a fragile tree (which one might call a Christmas tree) in the desert of terrorism and we must consider how this tree could be watered.

== Claudy bombings enquiry verdict ==
On 24 August 2010, a report by the Police Ombudsman for Northern Ireland was released in which the Ombudsman, Al Hutchinson, revealed his conclusions following an eight-year investigation into three car bomb attacks in the village of Claudy on 31 July 1972 in which nine civilians, three of them children, died.

A local priest, Father James Chesney, had been long rumoured to have been a leader of the IRA unit responsible for the bombings. Hutchinson revealed that following the attacks, Father Chesney had been transferred by the Church across the border up to Moville, a small town in Inishowen in the north of County Donegal in the Republic of Ireland, following discussions between Cardinal Conway, the then Primate of All Ireland, and William Whitelaw, who was then the British Government's Secretary of State for Northern Ireland. Almost all of Inishowen lies within the Diocese of Derry. This transfer was done with the full knowledge of Sir Graham Shillington, the Chief Constable of the Royal Ulster Constabulary (RUC), who "would have preferred that Chesney be transferred to Tipperary".

Seán Cardinal Brady denied that the wider Church was involved in a cover-up to protect Father Chesney, and he accepted the report's findings.

== Death and succession ==
For much of his time in Armagh, Conway did not have an auxiliary bishop to assist him in his many duties as bishop of a large diocese, head of the Irish Episcopal Conference and a senior advisor to Pope Paul VI. Only in 1974 was a former secretary, Fr. Francis Lenny, appointed as auxiliary bishop and Bishop of Rotdon and received Episcopal Ordination from Conway on 16 June 1974.

Illness prevented the Cardinal from attending the canonisation of St. Oliver Plunkett in Rome in October 1975, a highly unusual absence given than he was a successor to Plunkett and that this was the first new canonization of an Irish saint for almost seven hundred years. The strain of overwork took its toll on Cardinal Conway, who contracted cancer late in 1976. He died after a short illness on 17 April 1977.

The Requiem Mass was celebrated by the senior suffragan of the Armagh province, Bishop William Philbin, assisted by the late Cardinal's two brothers. He is buried in the grounds of St Patrick's Cathedral, Armagh.

In a debate in Seanad Éireann after his death tributes were paid to him by members of all parties. One Senator said of him: "His selection as Cardinal was a source of pride, joy and satisfaction to the whole country. As Cardinal and Primate of All Ireland he displayed the qualities of the truly great. Holding his high office at a time of undoubted difficulty, he gave courageous and faithful leadership without losing his inherent patience and gentleness. He will be remembered as a great churchman, a strong and fearless leader, a talented teacher and a devoted and patient pastor."

Brian Lenihan, on behalf of the Fianna Fáil party said: "During his period of primacy, in charge of the major church in this island, he had to cope with a period of very profound change within the Church itself. He coped with it successfully by combining a degree of realism and humanity in his administration of the Church during its period of change. Unfortunately during most of that time of primacy one had a period of almost revolutionary political developments causing great sorrow to all of us and he, in particular, must have suffered very intensely during that time which, unhappily, is still with us. At all stages during that development he showed leadership and courage and maintained a sense of dignity, showing at all times his abhorrence of all things violent and at the same time emphasising the basic virtues of peace, tolerance and charity which alone can bring all of us on this island out of the sorrow of the past ten years.

After a relatively short interregnum he was succeeded as Archbishop of Armagh, Primate of All Ireland, and later as cardinal, by Maynooth College academic and native priest of the Armagh Archdiocese Tomás Ó Fiaich.

== Episcopal succession ==
Catholic Church titles
Preceded by John D'Alton	Archbishop of Armagh and Primate of All Ireland; 1963–1977	Succeeded by Tomás Ó Fiaich
New title	Cardinal of San Patrizio; 1965–1977	Succeeded by Tomás Ó Fiaich
