= Anthony Farquhar =

Irish Roman Catholic bishop (1940–2023)

His Lordship Anthony Farquhar
- Auxiliary Bishop Emeritus of Down and Connor
- Metropolis: Armagh
- Appointed: 6 April 1983
- Term ended: 3 December 2015
- Predecessor: —
- Successor: —
- Other post: Titular Bishop of Hermiana (1983–2023)

Orders
- Ordination: 13 March 1965
- Consecration: 15 May 1983 by Cahal Brendan Daly

Personal details
- Born: 6 September 1940 Belfast, Northern Ireland
- Died: 18 November 2023 (aged 83) Belfast, Northern Ireland
- Motto: Sapientia Proficere

Anthony J. Farquhar (6 September 1940 – 18 November 2023) was an Irish Catholic prelate who was the Auxiliary Bishop of the diocese of Down and Connor.

== Early life and ministry ==
Anthony Farquhar was born and raised in South Belfast, Northern Ireland and educated at St. Malachy's College. He later studied classics at Queen's University, Belfast. He was then sent to study theology at the Pontifical Lateran University, Rome. He was ordained to the priesthood on 13 March 1965, aged 24.

Farquhar was assistant priest at Dunsford and Ardglass Parish. He was a hospital chaplain in 1966. He was later assigned to teach Latin at St MacNissi's College, Garron Tower, where he stayed as a teacher from 1966 to 1970. From 1970 to 1975 he was assistant chaplain, along with Ambrose Macaulay, to Queen's University, Belfast and finally as Chaplain/Lecturer at the University of Ulster from 1975 to 1983.

Farquhar's main outside interests were folk music and football, particularly student football. He was president of Queen's University Belfast A.F.C. and also served as patron of the Irish Universities Football Union.

== Bishop ==
On 6 April 1983, aged 42, Farquhar was appointed Titular Bishop of Hermiana and, with Patrick Walsh, as Auxiliary Bishop of Down & Connor. The principal consecrator was the Bishop of Down and Connor, Cahal Daly, (later Cardinal Archbishop of the Archdiocese of Armagh) and principal co-consecrators were Archbishop Gaetano Alibrandi, the Apostolic Nuncio to Ireland and William J. Philbin (Bishop Emeritus of Down and Connor). During the ordination ceremony, the assistant Priests to Bishop Farquhar were his priest uncles, Canon Walter Larkin and Fr. Thomas Aquinas Larkin O.C.D.

His episcopal motto was 'Sapientia Proficere' ('to increase in wisdom') from Luke 2:52. He took an active and ongoing interest in interchurch relations and served as Chairman of the Irish Bishops Conference on Ecumenism.

Farquhar travelled to Rome for the Quinquennial Visit Ad Limina visit in October 2006.

In December 2007 he officiated at the dedication of the new altar in the Church of the Good Shepherd in his native parish of the Most Holy Rosary, Belfast, following the renovation programme.

A book titled Inter-Church Relations: Developments and Perspectives, published by Veritas to mark the 25th anniversary of Farquhar's ordination as a bishop contained contributions by a number of people praising Farquhar's work. Seán Brady noted he was “engaged actively in promoting bonds of friendship and understanding at times when it has been far from easy to do so”.

== Retirement and death ==
On 3 December 2015, Pope Francis accepted Farquhar's resignation on the grounds of age. He was at that time the longest serving bishop in Ireland.

Farquhar died in Belfast on 18 November 2023, at the age of 83.

Catholic Church titles
| Preceded by — | Auxiliary Bishop of Down and Connor; 1983–2015 | Succeeded by — |
| Preceded by José Villalón Mercado | Titular Bishop of Hermiana; 1983–2023 | Succeeded by Vacant |
