= Tomás Ó Fiaich =

Irish cardinal (1923–1990)

His Eminence Tomás Ó Fiaich KGCHS
- Cardinal, Archbishop of Armagh; Primate of All Ireland
- Portrait of Cardinal Ó Fiaich
- Church: Catholic Church
- Archdiocese: Armagh
- Appointed: 18 August 1977
- Term ended: 8 May 1990
- Predecessor: William Conway
- Successor: Cahal Daly
- Other post: Cardinal Priest of San Patrizio
- Previous post: President of St Patrick's College, Maynooth

Orders
- Ordination: 6 July 1948
- Consecration: 2 October 1977 by Gaetano Alibrandi
- Created cardinal: 30 June 1979 by John Paul II
- Rank: Cardinal Priest

Personal details
- Born: Thomas Fee; 3 November 1923 Cullyhanna, County Armagh, Northern Ireland
- Died: 8 May 1990 (aged 66) Toulouse, Haute-Garonne, France
- Buried: St Patrick's Cathedral Cemetery, Armagh, Northern Ireland
- Denomination: Catholic
- Education: St Peter's College, Wexford
- Motto: Fratres In Unum
- Coat of arms

Tomás Séamus Ó Fiaich, KGCHS (3 November 1923 – 8 May 1990) was an Irish cardinal of the Catholic Church. He served as the Roman Catholic Archbishop of Armagh and Primate of All Ireland from 2 October 1977 until his death. He was created a Cardinal in 1979. Ó Fiaich was born in 1923 in Cullyhanna and raised in Camlough, County Armagh.

== Early life and education ==
Tomás Ó Fiaich (born Thomas Fee, adopting the fully Gaelicised version while a lecturer at St. Patrick's College Maynooth) was born in Cullyhanna, South Armagh, where his father was a local schoolmaster. He was educated locally before attending St Patrick's Grammar School, Armagh, and then proceeded to begin his studies for the priesthood in St Peter's College, Wexford, on 6 July 1948. John Cardinal D'Alton appointed him as an assistant priest in Clonfeacle parish, but after Ó Fiaich returned to full health he commenced post-graduate studies in University College Dublin (1948–1950), receiving an MA in early and medieval Irish history. Further study followed at the Catholic University of Leuven, Belgium, (1950–1952), culminating in Ó Fiaich receiving a licentiate in historical sciences.

In 1952, he returned to Clonfeacle where he remained as assistant priest until following summer 1953 and his appointment to the faculty of St Patrick's College, Maynooth.

== Member of staff at Maynooth College ==
Ó Fiaich was an academic and noted Irish language scholar, folklorist and historian in the Pontifical University in St Patrick's College, Maynooth, the National Seminary of Ireland. From 1959 to 1974 he was Professor of Modern Irish History at the college. In this capacity he suggested to Nollaig Ó Muraíle that he begin research on Dubhaltach Mac Fhirbhisigh and his works. He "was an inspired lecturer, an open and endearing man, who was loved by his students... Tomas O'Fiaich was my Good Samaritan."

He served as vice president of the college from 1970 to 1974, and was then appointed college president. He held this position until 1977.

== Archbishop of Armagh ==
Following the relatively early death from cancer of William Cardinal Conway in April 1977, Monsignor Ó Fiaich was appointed Archbishop of Armagh by Pope Paul VI on 18 August 1977. He was consecrated bishop on 2 October 1977. The principal consecrator was the papal nuncio Archbishop Gaetano Alibrandi; the principal co-consecrators were Bishop Francis Lenny, the auxiliary Bishop of Armagh, and Bishop William Philbin, the Bishop of Down and Connor. Pope John Paul II raised Ó Fiaich to the cardinalate on 30 June 1979; he was appointed Cardinal-Priest of S. Patrizio that same day.

=== Papal visit 1979 ===
The first major event in Ó Fiaich's cardinalate was the first ever papal visit to Ireland from 29 September to 1 October 1979 by Pope John Paul II. The Pope celebrated Mass before one million people in Phoenix Park, Dublin. His major speech calling on all the organisations that were prolonging The Troubles to end their activities was made in the Archdiocese of Armagh and was followed by a visit to the Marian Shrine at Knock, County Mayo. Cardinal Ó Fiaich was at the Pope's side during the entire visit.

=== Criticism ===
Ó Fiaich took a more understanding, or at least a less critical, stance than other episcopal colleagues on militant republicanism in part because of his own upbringing in Crossmaglen. His approach, including visits to republican prisoners in the Maze, triggered many complaints but Ó Fiaich was always adamant that he had pastoral responsibilities and that the strict work of politics especially in an era of Margaret Thatcher as well as Taoisigh such as Jack Lynch and Garret FitzGerald, was not his sphere. Unionists were also critical of Ó Fiaich.

Some of Ó Fiaich's sternest critics were in the Irish media, notably The Sunday Independent (which had a very strong anti-republican stance) and The Irish Times. He was, however, strongly defended on occasion by The Irish Press (a more nationalist paper) and An Phoblacht (which had a very pro-Sinn Féin & IRA stance).

=== Hunger strikes ===
During the IRA hunger strikes Ó Fiaich was believed by many to have been a privately influential figure among militant republican supporters, credited with helping end the first hunger strike through direct contact with militant republicans in the Maze Prison in Northern Ireland. He visited the Maze and witnessed the "Dirty Protest" (where prisoners rubbed their faeces on the walls of their cells and left food to rot on cell floors, while just wearing blankets and refusing to wash, in protest at the withdrawal of Special Category Status from militant republican prisoners). He stated:

"I was shocked at by the inhuman conditions . . . where over 300 prisoners are incarcerated. One would hardly allow an animal to remain in such conditions let alone a human being. The nearest approach to it that I have seen was the spectacle of hundreds of homeless people living in sewer pipes in the slums of Calcutta."

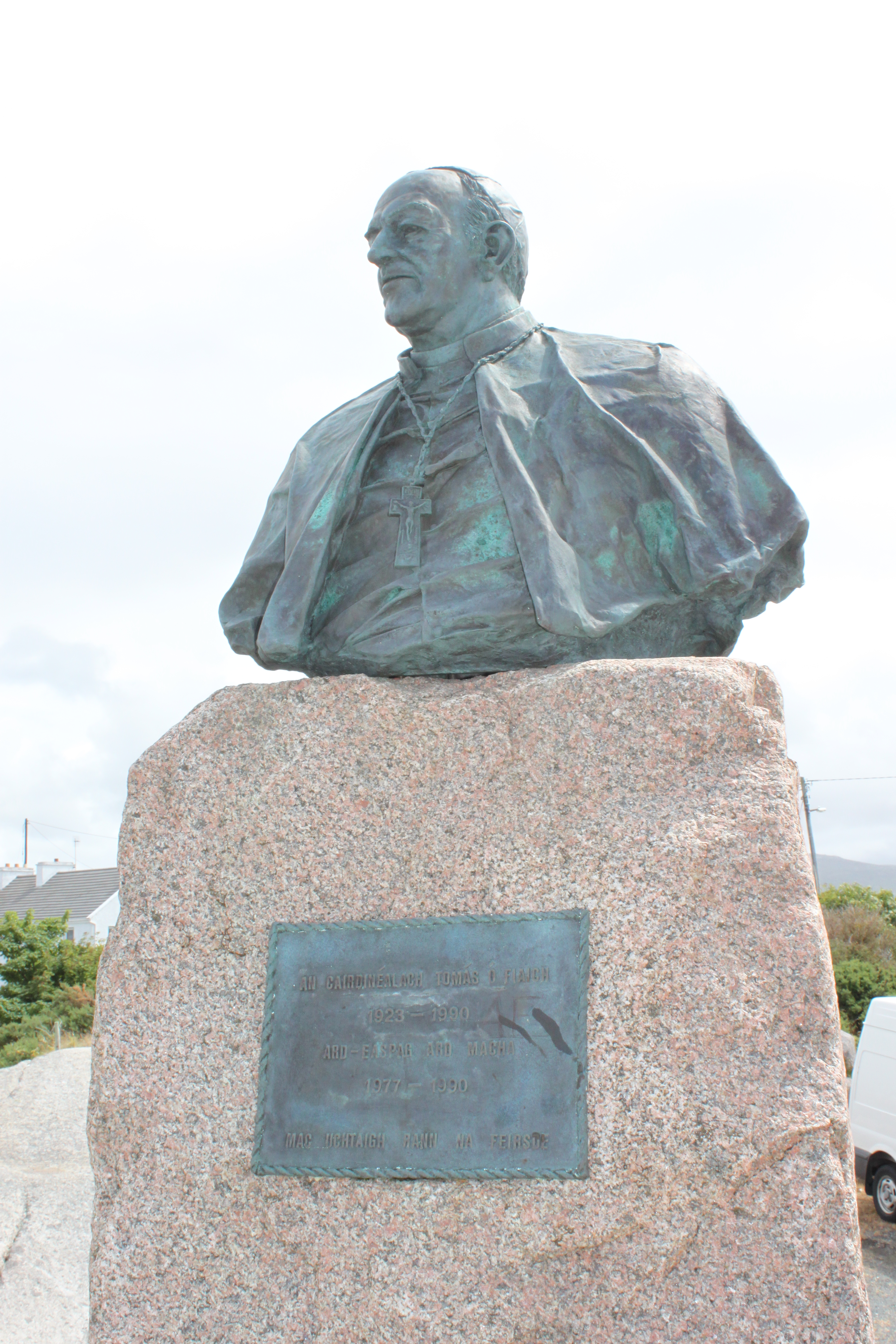
The bust of Cardinal Ó Fiaich in Ranafast, The Rosses, County Donegal.

When hunger striker Raymond McCreesh died, Ó Fiaich said:

"Raymond McCreesh was captured bearing arms at the age of 19 and sentenced to 14 years' imprisonment. I have no doubt that he would have never seen the inside of a jail but for the abnormal political situation. Who is entitled to label him a murderer or a suicide?"

While the Cardinal showed deep concern for the treatment of prisoners, he was equally critical of those who used violence to further the cause of Irish nationalism.

=== David Armstrong affair ===
In 1983, the Reverend David Armstrong, a Presbyterian minister, was forced to leave Limavady due to threats that followed his wishing Father Kevin Mullan's Catholic congregation "Happy Christmas". Cardinal Ó Fiaich gave the clergyman a cash donation to help him resettle in England.

=== Vatican service ===
During his tenure, Cardinal Ó Fiaich attended many synods and meetings of the Sacred College of Cardinals. The main meetings were

- First Plenary Assembly of the Sacred College of Cardinals, Vatican City, 5–9 November 1979
- World Synod of Bishops (Ordinary assembly), Vatican City, 26 September – 25 October 1980
- World Synod of Bishops (Ordinary assembly), Vatican City, 29 September – 28 October 1983
- World Synod of Bishops (Extraordinary assembly), Vatican City, 24 November – 8 December 1985
- World Synod of Bishops (Ordinary assembly), Vatican City, 1–30 October 1987

== Reordering of Armagh Cathedral ==
Styles of Tomás Ó Fiaich
- Reference style: His Eminence
- Spoken style: Your Eminence
- Religious style: (autofilled)
- Informal style: Cardinal
- See: Armagh

Ó Fiaich's re-ordering of the high Victorian neo-Gothic St. Patrick's Cathedral in Armagh proved very contentious. He had the highly decorated High Altar and rood screen replaced by a plain white Wicklow granite altar table.

Though Cardinal Ó Fiaich himself wrote approvingly of the new design for the sanctuary, many others were highly critical, arguing that the new sanctuary design defaced what had been a particularly fine nineteenth-century building, with the brutal simplicity of the white oval altar contrasting with the original features surviving. One critic, writing in The Sunday Independent, compared Ó Fiaich's altar to something from the set of Star Trek. The altar table installed during his time as Archbishop of Armagh was subsequently removed by Seán Cardinal Brady and a more classical replacement installed.

== Death ==
Ó Fiaich died of a heart attack on the evening of 8 May 1990 while leading the annual pilgrimage by the Archdiocese of Armagh to the Marian shrine of Lourdes in France. He had arrived in France the day before and had complained of feeling ill shortly after saying Mass at the grotto in the French town. He was rushed by helicopter to a hospital in Toulouse, 125 miles (200 km) away, where he died. He was aged 66. He lay in state at the cathedral in Armagh, where thousands of people lined up to pay their respects.

He was succeeded as archbishop and cardinal by a man six years his senior, Cahal Daly, then the Bishop of Down and Connor.

== Legacy ==
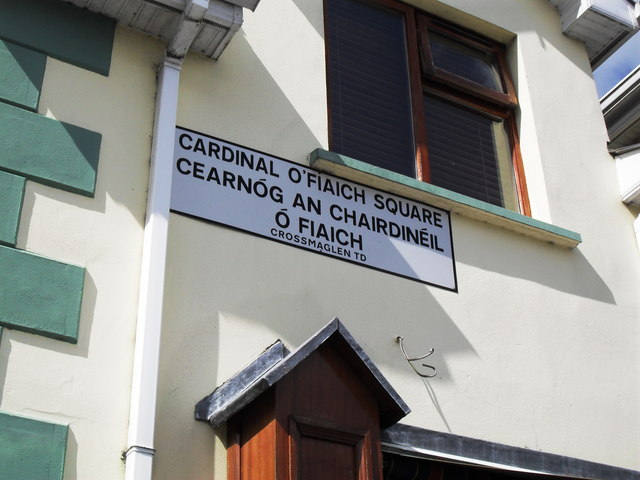
Cardinal Ó Fiaich Square, Crossmaglen

=== Cardinal Ó Fiaich Library ===
The Cardinal Tomás Ó Fiaich Memorial Library, a registered charity, was officially opened in Armagh 8 May 1999 by the Northern Ireland Secretary of State, Marjorie Mowlam. Named after the cardinal to honour his academic interests, it contains extensive archival material about Irish folklore, heritage and history. Cardinal Ó Fiaich's private papers covering his period as archbishop and cardinal are held by the library, as are those of nine previous Roman Catholic Archbishops of Armagh dating back to the mid-eighteenth century.

=== Cultúrlann McAdam Ó Fiaich ===
Cultúrlann McAdam Ó Fiaich is named in Cardinal Ó Fiaich's honour and is an Irish language cultural centre in which the first Irish-medium secondary school in Northern Ireland, Coláiste Feirste was founded. A bust of the cardinal can be seen in An Ceathrú Póilí, the centre's book shop.

=== Ancient Order of Hibernians ===
The Ancient Order of Hibernians, an exclusively Roman Catholic organisation largely (though not exclusively) based in the US, has named its No. 14 Division in Massachusetts and No. 7 Division in New York City after the late Cardinal.

== Footnotes ==
1. Then Minister for Foreign Affairs Dr Garret FitzGerald, on behalf of the Government, raised Alibrandi's position directly with Pope Paul VI and Cardinal Benelli at a meeting in 1975. (FitzGerald in The Irish Times)
2. Garret FitzGerald, All in a Life (Gill and Macmillan, 1991) p. 337.)
3. Statement by Tomás Cardinal Ó Fiaich, quoted in Tim Pat Coogan, The Troubles: Ireland's Ordeal 1966–1996 and the Search for Peace (Arrow, 1996)

== Writings ==
- Edmund O'Reilly, Archbishop of Armagh 1657–1669, in Father Luke Wadding Commemorative Volume, pp. 171–228 (Franciscan Fathers), 1957.
- Irish cultural influence in Europe, 6th to 12th century, Dublin, 1967.
- The Irish Bishops and The Conscription Issue 1918, in The Capuchin Annual, 1968.
- Columbanus in His Own Words (Dublin: Veritas Publications, 1974)
- Virgil's Irish background and departure for France, in Seanchas Ardmacha, ix (1985), pp. 301–17.
- Gaelscrínte san Eoraop. Dublin, 1986.
- Irish monks in Germany in the late Middle Ages, in The Church, Ireland and the Irish, (ed. W.J. Sheils and Diana Wood), Oxford, 1989; studies in Church history, xxv, pp. 89–104.
- The early period, in Rémonn Ó Muirí (ed.) Irish Church History Today, pp. 1–12, Armagh [1991?]
- Virgils Wededegand in Irland und sein Weg auf den Kontinent, in Virgil von Salzburg, pp. 17–26 (date unknown)

Catholic Church titles
Preceded by William Cardinal Conway	Archbishop of Armagh and Primate of All Ireland; 1977–1990	Succeeded by Cahal Cardinal Daly
Preceded by William Cardinal Conway	Cardinal-Priest of San Patrizio; 1979–1990	Succeeded by Cahal Cardinal Daly
