= Gerard Clifford =

Irish bishop (1941–2016)

The Most Reverend Gerard Clifford
- Auxiliary Bishop Emeritus of Armagh; Titular Bishop of Hieron
- Church: Roman Catholic
- Archdiocese: Armagh
- Appointed: 25 March 1991
- Term ended: 26 February 2013
- Predecessor: Francis Lenny
- Successor: Michael Router
- Other post: Titular Bishop of Hieron

Orders
- Ordination: 18 June 1967
- Consecration: 21 April 1991 by Cahal Daly

Personal details
- Born: 24 June 1941 Lordship, County Louth Ireland
- Died: 12 December 2016 (aged 75) Dublin, Ireland
- Education: St. Patrick’s College, Maynooth

Bishop Gerard Clifford (24 June 1941 – 12 December 2016) was an Irish prelate of the Catholic Church who served as Auxiliary Bishop of Armagh, Ireland from 1991 until 2013. He was born in Lordship, County Louth. He was educated at Bellurgan National School, Bush Vocational School, St Mary's College, Dundalk, and Saint Patrick’s College, Armagh. He studied for the priesthood at St. Patrick’s College, Maynooth and undertook postgraduate studies both in Maynooth and in the Jesuit Lumen Vitae, Brussels.

Bishop Clifford was ordained a priest on 18 June 1967 for the diocese and was appointed an auxiliary bishop of Armagh and Titular Bishop of Hieron on 25 March 1991. His episcopal consecration took place on 21 April 1991. The Principal Consecrator was Cardinal Daly; his Principal Co-Consecrators were Archbishop Emanuele Gerada, the Apostolic Nuncio to Ireland, and Francis Joseph MacKiernan, Bishop of Kilmore.
