= Holy Cross Church, Ardoyne =

Holy Cross Church
- Holy Cross Church, Ardoyne
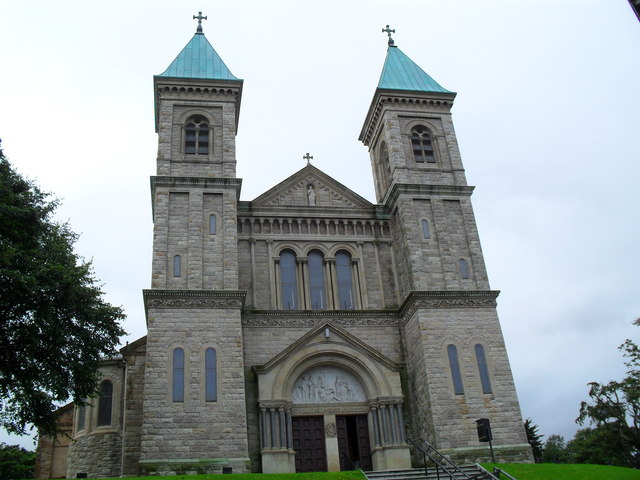
- Holy Cross Church
- 54.61232°N 5.96274°W
- Location: Crumlin Road; Ardoyne; Belfast
- Country: Ireland
- Denomination: Roman Catholic
- Website: holycrossparishbelfast.com/

History
- Consecrated: 1902

Architecture
- Architect(s): W.G. Doolin; Rudolph Maximilian Butler

Administration
- Archdiocese: Down and Connor
- Deanery: Ardoyne
- Parish: Holy Cross

Clergy
- Bishop: Alan McGuckian
- Priest: Aidan Troy

Holy Cross Church is a sandstone Catholic church in the Lombardic Romanesque style located at the intersection of the Crumlin Road and Woodvale Road in Ardoyne, Belfast. The current church replaced an earlier house of worship that had stood on the same site since 1869.

== History ==
In 1868, the Bishop of Down and Connor, Dr Patrick Dorrian, invited a group of Passionists, a Catholic clerical religious congregation, to establish a church and parish in Ardoyne. Fr Raphael, Fr Alphonsus and Brother Luke initially built a small church which opened in 1869 followed by a retreat house and monastery in 1881.

The adjoining Monastery was constructed in 1877-81 to the designs of Dublin based architects O’Neill & Byrne but in 1890 the walls of the original church were found to be in danger of collapse. Restoration work was begun but with the increase in the local population it was clear that an entirely new church building was required.
