= St Mary's University College, Belfast =

University college in Belfast, Northern Ireland

Coordinates: 54.593°N 5.961°W

St Mary's University College
- Coláiste Ollscoile Naomh Muire
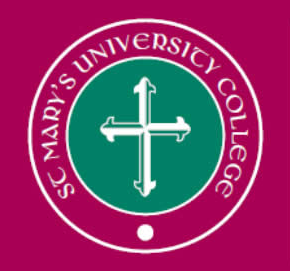
- Established: 1900
- Affiliations: IFCU; ACCU; GuildHE
- Religious affiliation: Roman Catholic
- Principal: Prof. Peter Finn
- Students: 1,060 (2024/25)
- Undergraduates: 850 (2024/25)
- Postgraduates: 215 (2024/25)
- Location: 191 Falls Road; Belfast; BT12 6FE, Belfast, Northern Ireland
- Affiliated university: Queen's University Belfast
- Website: www.stmarys-belfast.ac.uk

St Mary's University College is a university college in Belfast, Northern Ireland. It is a constituent college of Queen's University Belfast.

== History ==
The origins of the College can be traced back to 1900 when the Dominican Sisters opened St Mary’s Training College on the present Falls Road campus with an enrollment of 100 women students. For nearly 50 years after that, the college was concerned with the education of women students and their preparation for teaching in primary schools.

In 1948, four-year courses for post-primary teachers were introduced and, by arrangement with Queen’s University, Belfast, selected students could follow a combined course of university study and professional training.

In 1949 a men's department was established at Trench House. In 1961 it ceased to be the men's department of St Mary’s Training College and was constituted St Joseph’s Training College.

In 1968 the Senate of Queen’s University granted St Mary’s and St Joseph’s recognition for the instruction of matriculated students of the university in courses leading to the degree of Bachelor of Education.

In the 1970s, however, there was a decline in teacher education when the government decided, in response to falling school enrolments, to reduce the supply of teachers, and the Catholic bishops decided to amalgamate St Mary’s and St Joseph’s.

The new college, called St Mary’s University College, came formally into existence in September 1985.

From 1994 to 1996, a major programme of building and refurbishment was undertaken on the Falls Road campus. In June 1996 Trench House closed its doors for the last time, and the entire College was relocated on the newly extended and enhanced Falls Road campus.

== Academics ==
The institution is located on the Falls Road in Belfast, and has approximately 60 academic staff and 1,060 students (2024/25). The institution offers courses at undergraduate and postgraduate levels for teacher training, especially for a Catholic ethos, including a PGCE for Irish Medium Education. The college diversified its offerings several years ago and now offers a BA degree in liberal arts as well.

The university college's legacy institutions have been associated with Queen's University Belfast, since 1949. Since 1968 Queen's degrees have been obtainable by St Mary's students.

The Chairman of the Board of Governors is, ex-officio, the Bishop of the Diocese of Down and Connor. This is currently the Most Reverend Alan McGuckian of the Diocese.

== Facilities ==
The college has steadily expanded its facilities. In 2023 it opened developments at the Cardinal Newman Library, Tobar Mhuire, and the Beechmount Hall, Aonach na bhFeá.

== People associated with St Joseph's College ==
A number of prominent people trained as teachers in St Joseph's. They include the poet Seamus Heaney and dramatist Brian Friel, as well as the former SDLP MP and deputy first minister Seamus Mallon, and Tyrone Gaelic football manager Mickey Harte. The television presenter Frank Mitchell was a student there and the broadcaster Gerry Kelly taught there. Teacher and trade unionist Gerry Quigley studied at St Joseph's. Bishop Michael Dallat, who was lectured in St Mary's, served as principal of St Joseph's and was involved in the amalgamation of the two institutions.

== See also ==
- Education in Northern Ireland
- List of universities in Northern Ireland
