= Dallat =

Dallat is a surname. Notable people with the surname include:

- John Dallat (1947–2020), Irish politician
- Michael Dallat (1925–2000), Irish Roman Catholic bishop
