= List of Roman Catholic dioceses in Northern Ireland =

In the Roman Catholic Church, the entirety of Northern Ireland is comprehended by the ecclesiastical province of Armagh. The eponymous archdiocese and five of its suffragan dioceses cover the area of Northern Ireland. The diocesan and archdiocesan boundaries are not coterminous with the border between Northern Ireland and the Republic of Ireland. Only two dioceses are entirely contained within Northern Ireland: Down and Connor and the Diocese of Dromore. Three dioceses and the Archdiocese of Armagh straddle the border. The Archdiocese and its suffragans are all part of the Episcopal conference of Ireland.

== Ecclesiastical Province of Armagh ==
- Archdiocese of Armagh
  - Diocese of Clogher
  - Diocese of Derry
  - Diocese of Down and Connor
  - Diocese of Dromore
  - Diocese of Kilmore
