= Bernard Laverty =

Irish Roman Catholic priest

Monsignior Bernard Joseph Laverty (1863–1945) was an Irish Roman Catholic priest in the Diocese of Down and Connor.

He was born in 1863 in the parish of Duneane in County Antrim, studied at St. Malachy's College and St Patrick's College, Maynooth and was ordained for service as a priest in 1890 in the College Chapel in St. Malachy's.

His first appointment was to the parish of Newcastle, Co. Down and then to St. Matthew's Short Strand. Subsequently he transferred to St Peter's Cathedral, Belfast for 12 years the last six of which he was Administrator.

After a period in Ligoneil he was made parish priest of Holy Rosary Parish on Belfast's Ormeau Road in 1921. He was made chair of Belfast Catholic Protection Committee and participated in discussions with the police and government officials after Partition to explore Catholic involvement in the new state of Northern Ireland but very little came of these discussions.

Monsignor Laverty was made Vicar General of the Diocese in 1934 and two years later Dean of Down and Connor. He died on April 4, 1945, aged 82 and is buried in Milltown Cemetery.
