= Belfast Cathedral =

Belfast Cathedral may refer to:

- St Peter's Cathedral, Belfast, the Roman Catholic cathedral
- St Anne's Cathedral, Belfast, the Church of Ireland cathedral
