= Robert Blyth (bishop) =

Robert Blyth, OSB (b Norton, Derbyshire 1470 - d Cambridge 1547) was a Bishop of Down and Connor in the first half of the sixteenth century.

Also the Abbot of Thorney Abbey, he was first appointed on 16 April 1520; but accepted royal supremacy in 1539. He was deposed by Pope Paul III. Blyth also acted as a suffragan bishop in the Diocese of Ely from 1539 to 1541.

Church of Ireland titles
Preceded by Tiberio Ugolino	Bishop of Down and Connor; 1520–1541	Succeeded by Eugene Magennis
