= Robert Blyth =

Robert Blyth may refer to:

- Robert Blyth (footballer) (1900–1956), Scottish footballer
- Robert Blyth (bishop) (1470–1547), bishop of Down and Connor
- Robert Henderson Blyth (1919–1970), Scottish landscape painter and artist
- Bob Blyth (Robert Fleming Blyth, 1869–1941), Scottish footballer and manager

== See also ==
- Robert Blythe (disambiguation)
