= Patrick Walsh (bishop of Down and Connor) =

Irish Roman Catholic prelate (1931–2023)

The Most Reverend Patrick Walsh
- Bishop Emeritus of Down and Connor
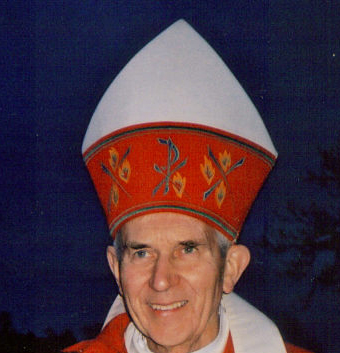
- Metropolis: Armagh
- Diocese: Down and Connor
- Appointed: 18 March 1991
- Term ended: 22 February 2008
- Predecessor: Cahal Daly
- Successor: Noël Treanor
- Previous posts: Auxiliary Bishop of Down and Connor and Titular Bishop of Ros Cré (1983–1991)

Orders
- Ordination: 25 February 1956
- Consecration: 15 May 1983 by Cahal Daly

Personal details
- Born: 9 April 1931 Cobh, Ireland
- Died: 28 December 2023 (aged 92) Belfast, Northern Ireland
- Motto: Ex Animo Operari

Patrick Joseph Walsh (9 April 1931 – 28 December 2023) was an Irish prelate of the Roman Catholic Church from Cobh, County Cork. From 1991 until 2008 he was the 31st Bishop of Down and Connor.

== Early life and education ==
Patrick Joseph Walsh was born on 9 April 1931 at Cobh, Irish Free State. When he was 11 years old, his RIC father moved the family to Belfast, Northern Ireland, where he attended St Marys CBGS Belfast and won university scholarships in both science and literature.

Walsh entered St. Malachy's College as a seminarian, attending Queen's University Belfast. During Philosophy studies at Queen's he was taught by the future archbishop of Armagh, Dr Cahal Daly. He then studied theology at the Pontifical Lateran University, Rome, completed a Licentiate in Sacred Theology and was ordained priest on 25 February 1956.

== Priestly ministry ==
After ordination Bishop Daniel Mageean sent Walsh for further studies to St Edmund's College, Cambridge (then known as St Edmund's House). He completed a M.Sc. in Mathematics at Christ's College, Cambridge, since St Edmund's was at the time unable to matriculate students of its own. He obtained another M.Sc. in 1962, from Queen's University, for a thesis on group characters.

Walsh was assigned as a mathematics teacher at St MacNissi's College, Garron Tower from 1958 to 1964. He was then chaplain, along with Fr Ambrose Macaulay, at Queen's from 1964 to 1970.

In 1970 he was appointed president of St. Malachy's College and served in this role until he became a bishop in 1983. Thereafter he served as chairman of the board of governors for the college for many years.

== Bishop ==
In 1983, with Dr Anthony Farquhar he was appointed Auxiliary Bishop of the Diocese of Down and Connor and was consecrated on 15 May by Bishop Cahal Daly, Archbishop Gaetano Alibrandi and Bishop William Philbin. During the ordination ceremony, the assistant priests to Bishop Walsh were Fr Charles Agnew and Fr Hugh Crossin. He was given the titular see of Ros Cré. His Episcopal Motto was 'Ex Animo Operari', to work with one's heart (Col 3:24).

In 1991, on the elevation of the then Bishop Daly as Archbishop of Armagh, Dr Walsh became the 31st Bishop of Down & Connor.

Walsh was the Principal Consecrator of Bishop Michael Dallat and Bishop Donal McKeown.

== Resignation ==
Walsh was succeeded as bishop by Monsignor Noel Treanor on 22 February 2008.

== Death and Burial ==
Walsh died on 28 December 2023, at Nazareth House Care Village in Belfast, where he had been a resident for some time. He was 92. He is buried in St Peter's Cathedral, Belfast. His death came six weeks after that of Bishop Anthony Farquhar who was consecrated with him and who also had been resident at Nazareth House.

His Requiem mass was celebrated by Donal McKeown who spoke of "the many different sorts of troubles that he had to deal with over the decades" further noting "Leadership is never easy. It is often closer to a crucifixion than to an enthronement.....making decisions in turbulent times is fraught with competing pressures. All a person can do is to seek God’s guidance in prayer, grasp the nettles and trust that in all things God is working for our salvation, even when we get things wrong. For him, that meant trying to make sense of the early student demonstrations in the late ’60s, leading a large school when Belfast descended into chaos in the ’70s – and then having to accept the awful truth that some of his ordained colleagues were capable of serial sexual abuse of children.”

Styles of Patrick Walsh
- Reference style: The Most Reverend
- Spoken style: My Lord
- Religious style: Monsignor
- Posthumous style: none

Catholic Church titles
Preceded by Cahal Daly	Bishop of Down and Connor; 1991–2008	Succeeded by Noël Treanor
Preceded by —	Auxiliary Bishop of Down and Connor; 1983–1991	Succeeded by —
Preceded by Philip James Anthony Kennedy	Titular Bishop of Ros Cré; 1983–1991	Succeeded by Ramon Arguelles
