= Noël Treanor =

Irish Roman Catholic prelate (1950–2024)

His Excellency, The Most Reverend Noël Treanor
- Apostolic Nuncio to the European Union
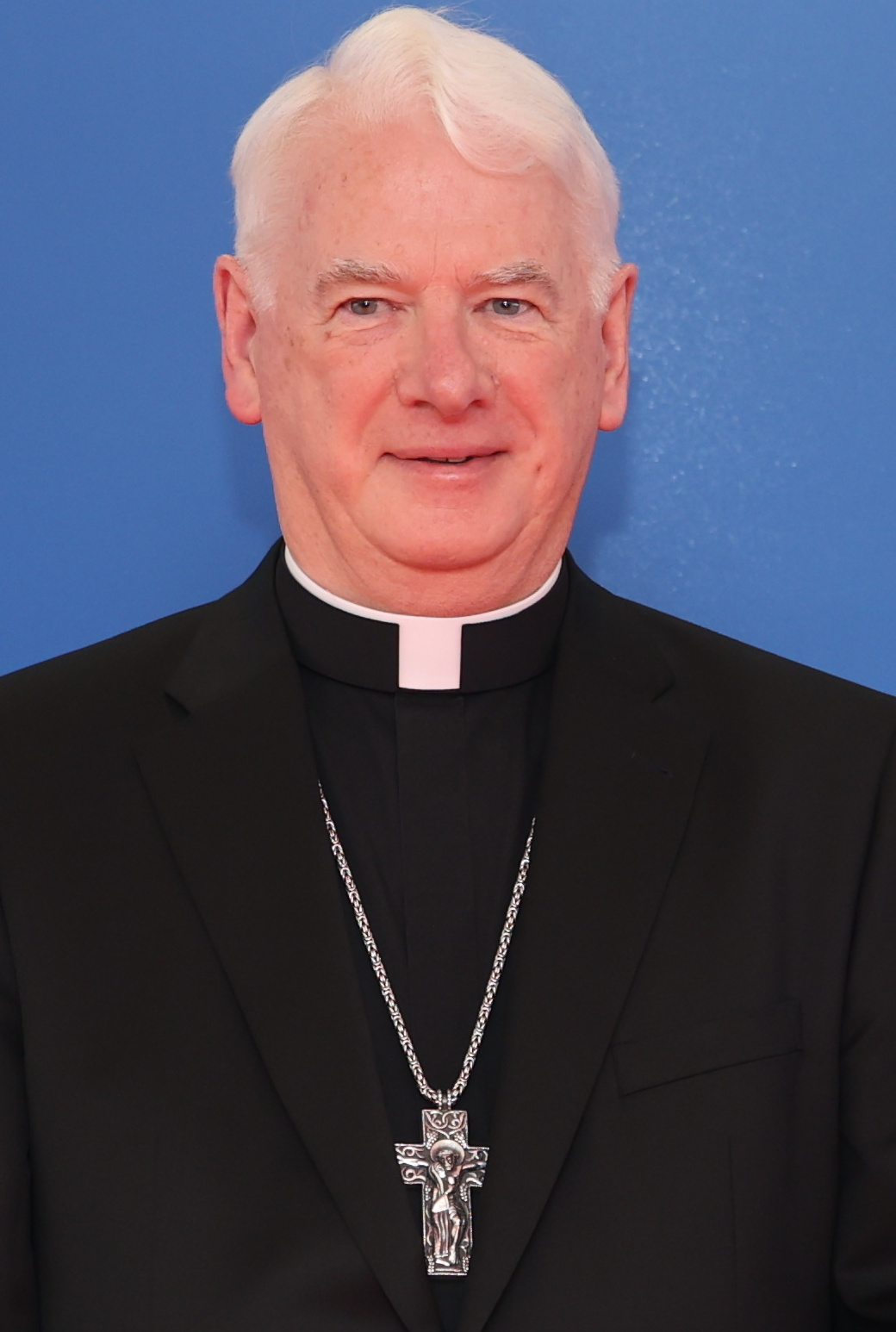
- Archbishop Treanor in 2023
- Church: Roman Catholic
- Appointed: 26 November 2022
- Term ended: 11 August 2024
- Predecessor: Aldo Giordano
- Successor: Bernardito Auza
- Previous posts: Bishop of Down and Connor (2008–2022); Secretary General of COMECE (1993–2008); Prefect of Studies at the Pontifical Irish College

Orders
- Ordination: 13 June 1976 by Patrick Mulligan
- Consecration: 29 June 2008 by Seán Brady

Personal details
- Born: 25 December 1950 Tyholland, Ireland
- Died: 11 August 2024 (aged 73) Brussels, Belgium
- Education: St Patrick's College, Maynooth; Pontifical Gregorian University
- Motto: Sicut filii lucis ambulate (Walk as children of light)
- Coat of arms

Styles of Noël Treanor
- Reference style: The Most Reverend: His Excellency; The Most Reverend
- Spoken style: Your Excellency
- Religious style: Archbishop

Noël Treanor (25 December 1950 – 11 August 2024) was an Irish Roman Catholic prelate who served as Apostolic Nuncio to the European Union with the personal title of archbishop from 2022 until his death in 2024. He was Secretary-General of the Commission of the Bishops' Conferences of the European Union (COMECE) from 1993 to 2008 and 32nd Bishop of Down and Connor from 2008 to 2022.

== Early life and education ==
Treanor was born on 25 December 1950 at Silverstream locality in Tyholland, County Monaghan. He attended primary school at St Brigid's National School, Leitrim, and secondary school at St Mary's CBS, Monaghan, before beginning studies in arts and philosophy at St Patrick's College, Maynooth in 1968 and later theology in 1971.

Treanor was ordained a priest for the Diocese of Clogher at Monaghan Cathedral on 13 June 1976.

== Presbyteral ministry ==
Following his ordination, Treanor was sent to the Pontifical Irish College for further studies in theology at the Pontifical Gregorian University, where he completed a licentiate in sacred theology, within special commendation, in 1977.

He was recalled to the Diocese of Clogher in 1980, where he received his first diocesan assignment as assistant in the cathedral parish of Monaghan and Rackwallace, with responsibility for the local Catholic marriage advisory council.

Treanor returned to Rome in 1981 to complete further studies, while also serving as Prefect of Studies at the Pontifical Irish College. He subsequently returned to Ireland in 1985, when he was appointed diocesan director of adult education and organised a diocesan assembly of clergy held in 1986 to promote pastoral renewal within the diocese. Treanor was next appointed curate in Enniskillen, where he also served as chaplain to the local general hospital and a confessor at the nearby St Patrick's Purgatory.

He was sent to Brussels in 1989, to work with COMECE. While deeply involved in the expanding endeavour of COMECE to project Christian values into the European process, Treanor continued to engage in pastoral work through contact with the local English-speaking community. He also published and lectured widely on European construction issues, the Church and Europe, and Church-State matters.

Treanor was appointed Secretary General of COMECE on 31 March 1993, and subsequently appointed Chaplain of His Holiness on 18 May 1994.

In addition to his native English and Irish, Treanor was fluent in French, German, Italian and Spanish.

== Bishop of Down and Connor ==
The then Monsignor Treanor was appointed Bishop of Down and Connor by Pope Benedict XVI on 22 February 2008. He was consecrated by the Archbishop of Armagh and Primate of All Ireland, Seán Brady, on 29 June in St Peter's Cathedral, Belfast. Treanor's was the first consecration of a newly-appointed bishop in the diocese since that of Daniel Mageean in 1929.

Ahead of a referendum in the Republic of Ireland on the ratification of the Treaty of Lisbon in October 2009, he advocated for a Yes vote, saying that Roman Catholics could vote in favour of the treaty in good conscience. Treanor cited his experience with COMECE in assuring an Oireachtas committee that ratification of the treaty would not affect Irish sovereignty over issues such as abortion and military neutrality.

He described the findings of the Murphy Report, published in November 2009, as "horrific", and expressed his confidence that the Diocese of Down and Connor had rid itself of all abusing priests.

Speaking at a press conference in August 2010, where previously undisclosed documents from diocesan archives relating to the Ballymurphy massacre were made public for the first time, Treanor expressed his support for an international, independent inquiry into the events of the massacre, adding:

As with Bloody Sunday, the reputations of those who were killed were actively besmirched and the evidence of the available eyewitnesses was either ignored or actively discredited. Indeed the events in Ballymurphy on August 9th–11th, 1971, would and perhaps should have been considered the necessary starting point for such an inquiry.

At the diocesan congress in 2013, he launched a review into ensuring that diocesan pastoral activities matched current resources, initiating a review of pastoral structures which drew upon the results of a census held in 2011. New pastoral communities were drafted and presented to clergy in three meetings and subsequently to the lay faithful, with a regular practice rate of 20% across the diocese significantly influencing future structures, leading to increased sharing of personnel, skills and finances.

Treanor ordained the first permanent deacons for diocesan service in October 2018.

== Diplomatic career ==
Treanor was appointed Apostolic Nuncio to the European Union, with the personal title of archbishop, by Pope Francis on 26 November 2022.

== Death ==
Treanor died of a heart attack in Brussels, on 11 August 2024, at the age of 73. He is buried at St Peter's Cathedral, Belfast.

== See also ==
- List of heads of the diplomatic missions of the Holy See

Diplomatic posts
Preceded by Paul Schaeffer	Secretary-General of COMECE; 31 March 1993 – 29 June 2008	Succeeded by Piotr Mazurkiewicz
Preceded by Patrick Walsh	Bishop of Down and Connor; 29 June 2008 – 26 November 2022	Succeeded by Alan McGuckian
Preceded by Aldo Giordano	Apostolic Nuncio to the European Union; 26 November 2022 – 11 August 2024	Succeeded by Vacant
