= St Peter's Cathedral, Belfast =

Coordinates: 54°35′57″N 5°56′40″W

Saint Peter's Cathedral
- Saint Peter's Cathedral, Belfast
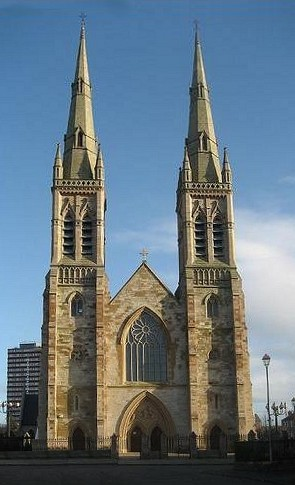

- Location within Northern Ireland
- Location: Belfast, County Antrim
- Country: Northern Ireland
- Denomination: Catholic Church
- Tradition: Roman Rite
- Website: https://stpetersbelfast.ie

History
- Consecrated: 14 October 1866

Architecture
- Architect(s): Fr Jeremiah Ryan McAuley; John O'Neill
- Style: Gothic Revival
- Years built: 1860–1866

Specifications
- Capacity: 850
- Length: 180 ft (55 m)
- Width: 70 ft (21 m)

Administration
- Province: Armagh
- Archdiocese: Archdiocese of Armagh
- Diocese: Down and Connor

Clergy
- Bishop: Alan McGuckian
- Priest(s): Very Rev. Thomas McGlynn Adm. Rev. Brian Watters CC; Rev. Aidan McCaughan

Saint Peter's Cathedral, Belfast (Irish: Ard Eaglais Naomh Peadar, IPA: [ˈaːɾˠd̪ˠ ˌaɡlˠəʃ n̪ˠiːw ˈpʲad̪ˠəɾˠ]), is the Catholic cathedral church for the Diocese of Down and Connor, and is therefore the episcopal seat of the Catholic Bishop of Down and Connor. It is located in the Divis Street area of the Falls Road in Belfast, Northern Ireland, and construction began in the 1860s. There are three choirs: the Cathedral Choir, the Down & Connor Schola Cantorum (Boys’ Choir) and the Cathedral Girls’ Choir.

The decision to designate St Peter's as the diocesan cathedral was taken by Bishop Cahal Daly who celebrated the Mass on 29 June 1986 at which the building was formally designated as the cathedral church of Down and Connor.

It is a Grade A listed building.

== History ==
Until the Reformation the cathedral of the Diocese of Down and Connor had been at Downpatrick. However, at the beginning of the 19th century, Belfast was a growing town; and with the appointment of William Crolly in 1825, the episcopal seat moved there. St Peter's was originally envisaged as the parish church for the expanding post-Famine Catholic population of Belfast.

The site was provided by a wealthy Belfast flour merchant and philanthropist, Bernard Hughes, while the church was designed by Fr Jeremiah Ryan McAuley, who had trained as an architect before he became a priest.

== The Building ==
St. Peter's is mostly built of gray Scrabo sandstone: entrance is by five doorways, two of which are porch entrances. The main entrance, a double doorway, has a sculptured spandril above it showing the Liberation of Peter. Internally there is an arcade of seven arches separating the aisle from the nave. The eighth arch was originally in the sanctuary. The building was opened on 14 October 1866 while the signature twin spires were added in 1886.

There is a hammer-beam ceiling with strong and vibrant colours used throughout, a reminder of the building's original appearance.

It was built on a scale and with a level of high quality interior decoration that it became known as a pro-cathedral, or temporary cathedral, for the diocese. In that regard it was an honour shared with St Patrick's Church, Belfast, in Donegall St where, for example, Bishop Patrick Dorrian was buried in 1885 and where, in 1929, Bishop Daniel Mageean was consecrated bishop.

It is the burial place - in the Chapel of the Resurrection on the North side - of three former bishops - William Philbin, Patrick Walsh and Noel Treanor. The window here depicts the Easter morning encounter between Christ and Mary Magdalene and is the work of Roisin Murphy-O'Dowd.

== Refurbishments ==
There were several extensive refurbishments in 1950 when Padraic Gregory enlarged the original porches of the north and south elevations, creating new side chapels and adding a new high altar and a marble baldacchino.

In the 1960s the altar was relocated while in 1986, under the direction of the Irish artist Ray Carroll, there was more refurbishment and a new wooden episcopal chair as part of a screen which obstructed the original canon's choir stalls. In 2003–2005 while Patrick Walsh was bishop much of the latter work was undone. This more recent refurbishment saw a new limestone altar and ambo, carved by Ken Thompson from Cork installed, and a baptismal font by the same artist placed near the narthex to underscore that sacrament as one of initiation. The font is inscribed "Unus Dominus, una fide, unum baptisma" (Eph 4:5).

One respected critic said of this most recent renovation "This most recent work has restored the Cathedral much nearer to its original appearance, especially in the use of strong and vibrant colours, on the fine hammer-beam ceiling."

== Liturgy in the cathedral ==
Mass is celebrated every day in the cathedral:

- Sunday Masses are: Vigil (Saturday) 5.30 pm; 9 am and 11 am (Solemn Mass).
- Weekday Masses are at 10 am, Monday, Wednesday, Friday and Saturday; 7.30 pm on Tuesdays and Thursdays.

Other sacraments and liturgies:

- Confessions are at 10.30 am and 5 pm on Saturdays.
- Adoration of the Most Blessed Sacrament takes place each Tuesday and Thursday from 10 am - 7 pm.
- Baptisms take place on Saturdays at 1 pm.
- As the diocesan Cathedral, St Peter's hosts major celebrations in the local Church calendar such as the Chrism Mass on Holy Thursday.

== Past administrators ==
From St Peter's Cathedral website unless otherwise stated:

- Fr William Blaney VG: 1866–1873
- Fr Andrew McAuley: 1873–1882
- Fr Patrick Convery: 1882–1895
- Fr John McCartan: 1895–1898
- Fr John Tohill: 1898–1905
- Fr Bernard Laverty: 1905–1911
- Fr John Healy: 1911–1919
- Fr Thomas McDonald: 1919–1928
- Fr William Patrick Lagan: March 1928
- Fr Alexander McAteer: 1929–1930
- Fr George McKillop: 1930–1938 - died in office 31st October 1938
- Fr John McLaverty: 1938–194
- Fr George Watson: 1943–1945
- Fr Leo McKeown: 1945–1949
- Fr Laurence Higgins: 1949–1955
- Fr Patrick McAtamney: 1955–1960
- Fr Joseph McConville: 1960–1963
- Fr James McCloskey: 1963–1966
- Fr Sean O’Neill: 1966–1967
- Canon Padraig Murphy: 1967–1971
- Fr Francis Teggart: 1971–1974
- Fr Alexander Darragh: 1974–1978
- Fr Vincent McKinley: 1978–1983
- Fr Joseph McGurnaghan: 1983–1986
- Fr Sean Connolly: 1986–1990
- Fr Anthony Alexander: 1990–1994
- Monsignor Thomas Toner: 1994–2006
- Fr Hugh Kennedy: 2006–2016
- Fr Martin Graham: 2016-2026
- Fr Thomas McGlynn 2026 -

== Bibliography ==
- Peter Galloway, The Cathedrals of Ireland, The Institute of Irish Studies, The Queen's University of Belfast, (1992).
