= Robert Blythe =

Robert Blythe may refer to:

- Robert Blythe (actor) (1947–2018), British actor
- Sandy Blythe (Robert Alexander "Sandy" Blythe, 1962–2005), Australian wheelchair basketball player
- Robert Blythe (mayor), American politician, mayor of Richmond, Kentucky

== See also ==
- Robert Blyth (disambiguation)
- Bob Blyth (1869–1941), Scottish football manager
