= Edmund O'Doran =

Irish Catholic bishop

Bishop Edmund O’Doran (c. 1701 – 1760) was Bishop of Down and Connor from January 1751 to June 1760. O'Doran's ministry took place against the backdrop of the penal laws and little is known with certainty about his early life.

He studied at the Complutense University of Madrid and served for a time in Spain. He was named Vicar General of the Diocese of Down and Connor in 1749. He was consecrated as bishop in 1751. He died 18 June 1760.
