= Carew Reynell (bishop) =

Irish Anglican bishop

Carew Reynell DD (1698–1745) was an Anglican bishop.

A Londoner, he was educated at Winchester and New College, Oxford and held incumbencies in Colerne and Bristol. He was also Chaplain to William Bradshaw, Bishop of Bristol and Chancellor of that diocese. In 1739 he became Chaplain to William Cavendish, 3rd Duke of Devonshire, Lord Lieutenant of Ireland who elevated him to the Bishopric of Down and Connor two years later.

He died on 1 January 1745.
