= San Patrizio =

Church of St. Patrick
- Church of Saint Patrick at the Villa Ludovisi
- Chiesa di San Patrizio a Villa Ludovisi
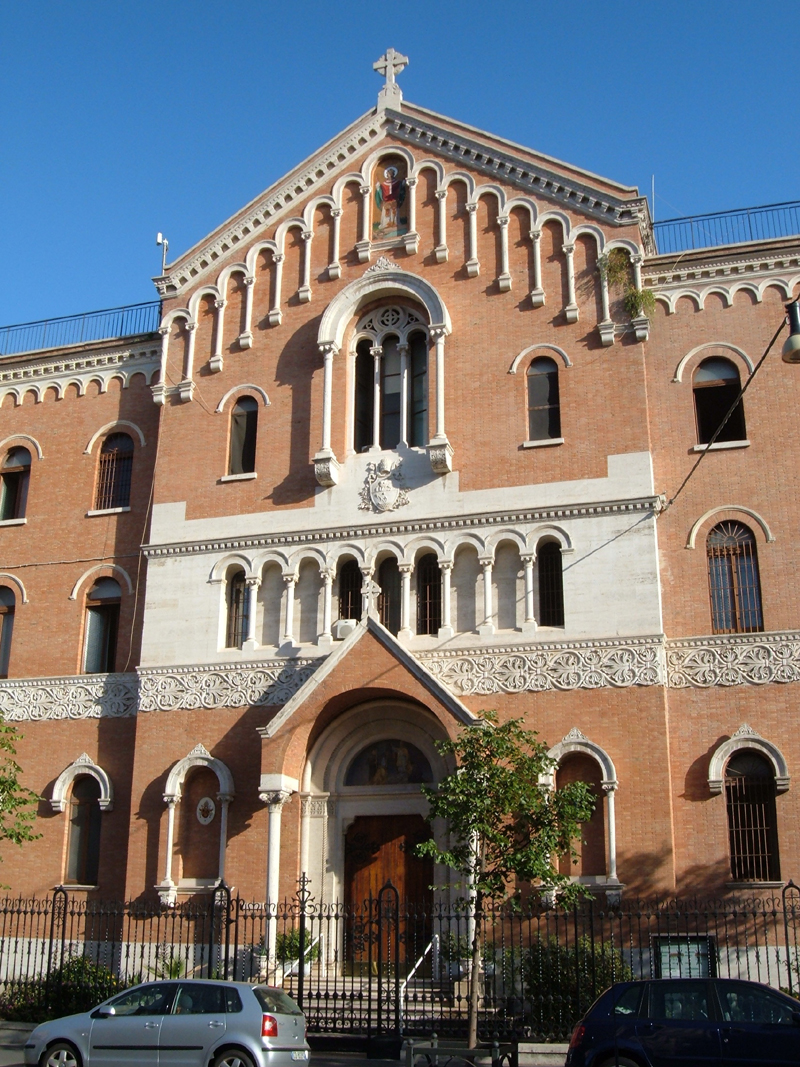
- Façade
- Click on the map for a fullscreen view
- 41°54′31″N 12°29′35″E
- Location: Via Boncompagni 31, Rome
- Country: Italy
- Language(s): Italian, English
- Denomination: Catholic
- Tradition: Roman Rite
- Religious order: Paulist Fathers
- Website: stpatricksamericanrome.org

History
- Status: titular church, national church
- Founded: 1908
- Dedication: Saint Patrick

Architecture
- Functional status: Parish church
- Architect: Aristide Leonori
- Architectural type: Byzantine revival, Renaissance Revival
- Completed: 1911

Administration
- Diocese: Rome

Clergy
- Rector: Rev. Matthew Berrios, C.S.P.
- Vicar(s): Rev. Greg Apparcel, C.S.P.

The Church of St. Patrick at the Villa Ludovisi (Chiesa di San Patrizio a Villa Ludovisi) is a Catholic parish church, titular church, and the national church of the United States in Rome, Italy.

== History ==
The church served as one of the national churches in Rome for Ireland until 2017 when it became the national church for the United States. It had been under the administration of Augustinian friars from Ireland until they withdrew from their longtime ministry there in 2012, due to a lack of members. Since August 1, 2017 (when they were transferred from Santa Susanna), it has been under the pastoral care of the Missionary Society of Saint Paul the Apostle (Paulist Fathers), a religious society which originated and is based in New York City.

It was built in 1908 to designs in a Romanesque-Byzantine revival style by Aristide Leonori. An earlier church on the site, the Chiesa di Santa Maria in Posterula, was demolished, but a fresco was saved from it and installed in the new structure. The mosaic in the apse dates from 1929 and depicts St. Patrick preaching to the crowds.

Its current Cardinal Priest is Thomas Collins, the former Archbishop of Toronto.

Since the move, the current National Church for Ireland is the Church of Sant'Isidoro a Capo le Case.

== Cardinal Priests ==
- William Conway (25 February 1965 – 17 April 1977)
- Tomás Ó Fiaich (30 June 1979 – 8 May 1990)
- Cahal Daly (28 June 1991 – 31 December 2009)
- Thomas Collins (18 February 2012 – present)
