= Theophilus MacCartan =

Irish Roman Catholic bishop

Theophilus MacCartan (1700–1778) was Roman Catholic Bishop of Down and Connor from 10 September 1760 until his death on 16 December 1778.

MacCartan was a scion of a long established family McCartan in the wider Barony of Kinelarty, one of the seven baronies in County Down. It is the most central and contains the towns of Ballynahinch, Saintfield, Downpatrick, Clough, Dundrum, Newcastle and Castlewellan.

His early life and education took place against the Penal Laws's backdrop, so firm details are scarce. But a generally respected source, writing at the end of the nineteenth century, asserts that the future bishop was born in Aughnagon near Mayobridge around 1700.

He was ordained priest at Ballykinlar by Bishop John Armstrong (1727–1739) and, as was often the case in the eighteenth century, was sent to study theology after ordination: in his case at the Sorbonne. It is believed that sometime around 1737 he was appointed parish priest of Loughinisland and erected the first church there.

== Episcopal ministry ==
There is a record of then-bishop (and his kinsman) Dominic McCartan from Clonvarghan House each subscribing £5 so that the popular devotional book Imitation of Christ by Thomas a Kempis could be translated into Irish. An early twentieth century account of the Bishops of Down and Connor suggests that Bishop MacCartan "always preached in Irish" and that during his episcopate, the first relaxation in the penal code was made.

In 1773, he donated a chalice for use by any priest of the name McCartan, or the most senior priest of that name, in either the Roman Catholic Diocese of Dromore or his native Down and Connor. The chalice has been in continuous use since and there is a well-established historical record of the priests who have used this chalice. His last will and testament has been preserved and much of the what is known about him and his episcopal ministry is drawn from that document drawn up days before his died. He is buried in Loughinisland, the parish which had been so central to his priestly and episcopal ministry.
