= John Chardon =

John Chardon (also Charden, Charldon and Charlton) (died 1601) was an Englishman who became the Church of Ireland bishop of Down and Connor from 1596 to 1601.

== Life ==
A native of Devon, he became a sojourner of Exeter College, Oxford, in 1562 at a young age. He was elected probationer on 3 March 1565, and after some wildness, on 24 October 1566 was admitted full and perpetual scholar after he had publicly sworn obedience to the statutes. Chardon proceeded B.A. and received priest's orders the same month. He resigned his fellowship on 6 April 1568.

In 1571 he was a schoolmaster at Worksop, Nottinghamshire, holding possibly at the same time the post of chaplain to Sir Gervase Clifton (d. 1581). On 9 August of that year he was instituted to the living of Heavitree, near Exeter, and on 27 May 1572 he proceeded M.A. He was a noted preacher, upholding the reformed doctrine, and at the same time defending the order of the Church of England. On 15 November 1581 he took the degree of B.D., and proceeded D.D. on 14 April 1586. In 1596 he was appointed bishop of Down and Connor by patent, and was consecrated on 4 May in St. Patrick's Cathedral, Dublin, receiving from the crown on the 26th of the same month the vicarage of Cahir in the diocese of Lismore; he was also appointed to the wardenship of St. Mary's College, Youghal, on the resignation of Nathaniel Baxter in 1598.

== Works ==
His published sermons included the funeral sermon for Sir Gawen Carew, buried in Exeter Cathedral on 22 April 1584, and one from 1594 dedicated Thomas Fulford and commemorating the relief of Exeter in the Prayer Book Rebellion. The Casket of Jewels from 1571 is a work of moral philosophy, a translation of the Brevis et perspicua totius ethicae seu de moribus philosophiae descriptio (1566) of the humanist Cornelius Valerius (1512–1578).
