= Tiberio Ugolino =

Catholic Bishop in Ireland

Tiberio Ugolino was a thrice appointed Bishop of Down and Connor who held the post, firstly, in 1483 and, finally, in 1519.
