= Bishop of Down and Connor =

Bishopric in Ireland

The Bishop of Down and Connor (Irish: Easpag an Dúin agus Chonaire) is an episcopal title which takes its name from the town of Downpatrick (located in County Down) and the village of Connor (located in County Antrim) in Northern Ireland. The title is still used by the Catholic Church for the diocese of that name, but in the Church of Ireland it has been modified into other bishoprics.

== History ==
The sees of Down and Connor were established at the Synod of Rathbreasail in 1111. For a brief period in the early 12th century, they were united under Máel Máedóc Ua Morgair (Saint Malachy), who also became Archbishop of Armagh.

On 29 July 1438, plans for a permanent union of the sees of Down and Connor were submitted to King Henry VI of England for his sanction. Exactly twelve months later, 29 July 1439, Pope Eugene IV issued a papal bull stating that Down and Connor were to be united on the death or resignation of either bishop. In 1442, Bishop John Sely of Down was deprived of his see by Pope Eugene IV, thereby effecting the union of the two dioceses. John Fossade, who had been bishop of Connor since 1431, became the bishop of the united see of Down and Connor in late 1442. However, due to strong opposition to the union in the diocese of Down, three more bishops of Down were appointed, two whilst Fossade was alive and one after his death. It was not until the appointment of Thomas Knight that the two sees accepted union under one bishop.

Following the upheaval of the 16th-century Reformation in Ireland, there were parallel apostolic successions. In the Church of Ireland, Down and Connor merged with Dromore in 1842 to form the Bishopric of Down, Connor and Dromore. This arrangement continued until 1945 when it was separated into the bishoprics of Down & Dromore and Connor.

In the Roman Catholic Church, the see of Down and Connor continues. Since the first half of the nineteenth century the bishop has lived in Belfast rather than the Downpatrick area. The incumbent is the Most Reverend Alan McGuckian, Bishop of the Roman Catholic Diocese of Down and Connor, who was appointed by the Holy See on 2 February 2024 and ordained bishop on 6 August 2017.

== Lists of bishops ==
=== Pre-Reformation bishops ===
Pre-Reformation Bishops of Down and Connor
From	Until	Incumbent	Notes
1442	1450	John Fossade	John Festade; appointed Bishop of Connor in 1431; became Bishop of Down and Connor in 1442, however, due to local opposition, he did not get full control; died in the spring of 1450.
1453	1469	Thomas Knight' OSB	Appointed 24 August 1453; consecrated 31 May 1456; acted as a suffragan bishop in the diocese of London 1459–63; died before July 1469.
1469	1480	Tadhg Ó Muirgheasa	Thaddaeus; appointed 10 July; consecrated 10 September 1469; died after July 1480.
1483	1519	Tiberio Ugolino	Appointed thrice: 14 February 1483, 12 September 1484 and 1 September 1485; consecrated 12 March 1489; died before April 1519

=== Post-Reformation Church of Ireland bishops ===
Church of Ireland Bishops of Down and Connor
From	Until	Incumbent	Notes
1520	c. 1541	Robert Blyth OSB (Note: Blyth and Magennis were both bishops in both successions.)	Appointed 16 April 1520; accepted royal supremacy in 1539; acted as a suffragan bishop in the diocese of Ely 1539–1541; resigned c. 1541; died after 19 October 1547.
1542	c. 1559–63	Eugene Magennis	Papal appointee from 1539, he accepted royal supremacy and was confirmed by letters patent 8 May 1542; retained possession during the reign of Queen Mary I; probably attended the 1560 parliament and took the Oath of Supremacy; died c. 1559–63.
1565	1567	James MacCawell	Nominated 6 June 1565, but is not known for certain if he was consecrated or obtained possession; promoted to the archbishopric of Cashel in 1567.
1569	1571	John Merriman	Received temporalities 20 December 1568; consecrated 19 January 1569; died before 6 July 1571.
1572	1582	Hugh Allen	Appointed by letters patent 21 November 1572; translated to Bishop of Ferns 24 May 1582.
1582	1593	See vacant	
1593	1595	Edward Edgeworth	Nominated 31 July 1593; consecrated 1593; died 1595.
1596	1601	John Chardon	Appointed by letters patent; consecrated 4 May 1596; died 1601.
1602	1607	Robert Humpston	Nominated 17 July 1601; consecrated 5 April 1602; died before 14 January 1607.
1607	1612	John Todd	Formerly Dean of Cashel; nominated to Down and Connor and to Dromore 24 January; appointed to all three by letters patent 16 May 1607; resigned 20 January 1612.
1612		James Dundas	Nominated 23 February; consecrated July 1612; died before 29 November 1612.
1613	1635	Robert Echlin	Nominated 29 November 1612; appointed by letters patent 4 March 1613; died 17 July 1635.
1635	1661	Henry Leslie	Nominated 8 August; consecrated 4 October 1635; translated to Meath 19 January 1661.
1661	1667	Jeremy Taylor	Nominated 6 August 1660; consecrated 27 January 1661; also appointed administrator of the see of Dromore 23 June 1661; died 13 August 1667.
1667	1672	Roger Boyle	Nominated 26 August; consecrated 18 October 1667; translated to Clogher 19 September 1672; he was the younger brother of Richard Boyle, Bishop of Ferns and Leighlin.
1672	1694	Thomas Hacket	Nominated 29 August; consecrated 28 September 1672; deprived on 21 March 1694 for continued non-residence, neglect and other offences against ecclesiastical law; died in August 1697.
1694	1695	Samuel Foley	Nominated 17 August; consecrated 2 September 1694; died 22 May 1695.
1695	1699	Edward Walkington	Nominated 10 July; consecrated 4 August 1695; died in January 1699.
1699	1720	Edward Smyth	Nominated 21 January; consecrated 2 April 1699; died 16 October 1720.
1721	1739	Francis Hutchinson	Nominated 30 November 1720; consecrated 22 January 1721; died 23 June 1739.
1739	1743	Carew Reynell	Nominated 4 September; consecrated 18 November 1739; translated to Derry 6 May 1743.
1743	1752	John Ryder	Translated from Killaloe; nominated 25 April 1743; appointed by letters patent 1 August 1743; translated to Tuam 19 March 1752.
1752		John Whitcombe	Translated from Clonfert and Kilmacduagh; nominated 24 February 1752; appointed by letters patent 21 March 1752; translated to Cashel 1 September 1752.
1752	1753	Robert Downes	Translated from Ferns and Leighlin; nominated 12 August 1752; appointed by letters patent 13 October 1752; translated to Raphoe 16 January 1753.
1753	1765	Arthur Smyth	Translated from Clonfert; nominated 28 December 1752; appointed by letters patent 24 January 1753; translated to Meath 28 October 1765.
1765	1783	James Traill	Nominated 27 September; consecrated 3 November 1765; died 12 November 1783.
1784	1804	William Dickson	Nominated 19 November 1783; consecrated 1 February 1784; died 19 September 1804.
1804	1823	Nathaniel Alexander	Translated from Killaloe and Kilfenora; nominated 2 November 1804; appointed by letters patent 21 November 1804; translated to Meath 21 March 1823.
1823	1848	Richard Mant	Translated from Killaloe and Kilfenora; nominated 13 March 1823; appointed by letters patent 23 March 1823; became Bishop of Down, Connor and Dromore from 9 April 1842; died 2 November 1848.
In 1842, Down and Connor united with Dromore to form the united bishopric of Down, Connor and Dromore

=== Post-Reformation Roman Catholic bishops ===
Roman Catholic Bishops of Down and Connor
From	Until	Incumbent	Notes
1520	1539	Robert Blyth OSB	Appointed 16 April 1520; deposed by Pope Paul III in 1539 when he accepted royal supremacy; died 1547.
1539	1559	Eugene Magennis	Appointed 16 June 1539; accepted royal supremacy in 1541, but remained in possession of the see during the reign of Queen Mary I; probably attended the 1560 parliament and took the Oath of Supremacy; died c. 1559–63.
1565	1580	Miler Magrath OFM	Appointed 12 October 1565; accepted royal supremacy in 1567; on 14 March 1580 he was deposed from the see by Pope Gregory XIII.
1580	1581	Donat O'Gallagher OFM	Translated from Killala; appointed 23 March 1580; died c. 1581.
1582	1612	Bl. Conor O'Devany OFM	Appointed 27 April 1582; consecrated 2 February 1583; executed 1 February 1612; beatified by Pope John Paul II on 27 September 1992.
1614	1625	Patrick Hanratty	Appointed vicar apostolic by papal brief 7 March 1614; translated to Dromore in 1625.
1625	1629	Edmund Dungan	Appointed 9 June 1625; consecrated in July 1626; died 1629.
1630	1640	Hugh Magennis OFM	Bonaventura; appointed 22 April and again 28 June 1630; died 24 April 1640.
1640	1642	See vacant	
1642	1643	Heber MacMahon	Appointed 10 March 1642; translated to Clogher 27 June 1643.
1647	1653	Arthur Magennis OCist	Appointed 11 March 1647; consecrated 1 May 1648; died 24 March 1653.
1657	1670	Michael O'Beirn	Appointed vicar apostolic by papal brief 17 April 1657; died c. 1670.
1671	1673	Daniel Mackey	Appointed 4 May 1671; died 24 December 1673.
1673	1711	See vacant	During this period, the two dioceses of Down and Connor seem to have been governed by separate vicars general.
1711	unknown	Terence O'Donnelly	Appointed vicar apostolic of Down by papal brief 22 August 1711; vicar apostolic of both from February 1714.
1717	1724	James O'Shiel OFM	Appointed 2 October; consecrated in November 1717; died 13 August 1724.
1727	1739	John Armstrong	Appointed 7 April 1727; died in December 1739.
1740	1749	Francis Stuart OFM	Appointed 19 September; consecrated 24 November 1740; died in May 1749.
1751	1760	Edmund O'Doran	Appointed 30 January 1751; died 18 June 1760.
1760	1778	Theophilus MacCartan	Appointed 10 September 1760; died 16 December 1778.
1779	1794	Hugh MacMullan	Appointed 11 August 1779; died 8 October 1794.
1794	1824	Patrick MacMullan	Appointed coadjutor bishop 29 July; consecrated 21 September 1793; succeeded 8 October 1794; died 25 October 1824.
1825	1835	William Crolly	Appointed 6 February; consecrated 1 May 1825; translated to Armagh in April or May 1835.
1835	1865	Cornelius Denvir	Appointed 6 September 1835; resigned May 1865; died 10 July 1866.
1865	1885	Patrick Dorrian	Appointed coadjutor bishop 13 June; consecrated 19 August 1860; succeeded in May 1865; died 3 November 1885.
1886	1895	Patrick MacAlister	Appointed in 1886; consecrated 28 March 1886; died 26 March 1895.
1895	1908	Henry Henry	Appointed 16 August; consecrated 22 September 1895; died 8 March 1908.
1908	1914	John Tohill	Appointed 5 August; consecrated 20 September 1908; died 4 July 1914.
1915	1928	Joseph MacRory	Appointed 18 August; consecrated 14 November 1915; translated to Armagh 22 June 1928.
1929	1962	Daniel Mageean	Appointed 31 May; consecrated 25 August 1929; died 18 January 1962.
1962	1982	William Philbin	Translated from Clonfert; appointed 5 June 1962; retired 24 August 1982; died 23 August 1991.
1982	1990	Cahal Daly	Translated from Ardagh and Clonmacnoise; appointed 24 August 1982; translated to Armagh 6 November 1990.
1991	2008	Patrick Walsh	Appointed titular bishop of Ros Cré and auxiliary bishop of Down and Connor on 6 April 1983; ordained bishop 15 May 1983; appointed diocesan bishop of Down and Connor on 18 March 1991; retired 22 February 2008.
2008	2022	Noel Treanor	Appointed 22 February; ordained bishop 29 June 2008; appointed Apostolic Nuncio to the European Union 26 November 2022.
2024	present	Alan McGuckian	Appointed 2 February 2024

== Bibliography ==
- Cotton, Henry (1850). The Province of Connaught. Fasti Ecclesiae Hiberniae: The Succession of the Prelates and Members of the Cathedral Bodies of Ireland. Vol. 4. Dublin: Hodges and Smith.
- Fryde, E. B.; Greenway, D. E.; Porter, S.; Roy, I., eds. (1986). Handbook of British Chronology (3rd, Reprinted 2003 ed.). Cambridge: Cambridge University Press. ISBN 0-521-56350-X.
