= Patrick MacMullan =

Irish Roman Catholic Prelate and Bishop of Down and Connor

- Born: Bishop Patrick MacMullan; 17 March 1752
- Died: 25 October 1824 (aged 72); Loughinisland, United Kingdom of Great Britain and Ireland

Bishop Patrick MacMullan (17 March 1752 – 25 October 1824) was an Irish Roman Catholic Prelate and 20th Bishop of Down and Connor.

He was a native of mid Down and details of his early life in the latter half of the eighteenth century are sketchy. It is believed he was ordained to the priesthood in 1775.

He received episcopal consecration on 2 September 1793, and the following year succeeded his distant cousin Hugh as Bishop of Down and Connor.

In 1814 he made a report to Rome on the state of his diocese (served by around 35 parish priests and a few curates) which although vague gives some indication of the state of the diocese.

He died on 25 October 1824 in the house of his nephew in Loughinisland and is buried at Loughinisland Graveyard.

A notice of his death, circulated in many Irish newspapers noted that "the Catholic Clergy of that diocese [Down and Connor] have been under the scriptural jurisdiction of this amiable Prelate for 31 years, during which he has presided over them with the politeness of a Gentleman, the abilities of a Theologian, and the meekness of a humble and exemplary Christian."
