= Michael Dallat =

Irish Catholic bishop (1925–2000)

Michael Dallat (11 June 1925 – 25 September 2000), D.D., M.A., S.T.L., was the Titular Bishop of Thala and Auxiliary Bishop of The Diocese of Down and Connor.

== Early life and study ==
Bishop Dallat was a native of Ballycastle, one of several sons to Peter and Sarah (née O'Neill) Dallat. His brother Christopher was also a priest in The Diocese of Down and Connor. After post primary education in St Malachy's College (1938–43), he proceeded to Queen's University where he graduated with an M.A. in History (1947). He was one of the first generation of students who began to study theology in Rome after the war. His theology studies (1947–51) were completed at the Pontifical Lateran University, where he obtained a Licentiate in Sacred Theology.

Styles of Michael Dallat
- Reference style: The Most Reverend
- Spoken style: Your Lordship
- Religious style: Bishop
- Posthumous style: Monsignor

== Ministry ==
Dallat was ordained priest for the Diocese of Down and Connor on 10 March 1951. Following ordination, he was sent to pursue further studies for four years at the Catholic University of Leuven, (1951–55) where he took courses in Sociology and Historical Science. It was a source of some amusement that a man who, as Bishop Patrick Walsh said at his funeral "would never use a paragraph when a sentence would do", obtained further postgraduate qualifications with unusually long titles -Lic.en Pol et Soc, Lic en Sc Hist.

He spent much of his life in education. Initially he was appointed to the teaching staff of St Malachy's College, his alma mater, before beginning his twenty four years in teacher training. He taught first at St Mary's Teacher Training College (1963–69), and was then appointed as Principal of St Joseph's Teacher Training College. He was a staunch defender of the principles of Catholic education, when there were proposals to move towards a unitary system for teacher training. His work also involved the amalgamation of St Mary's and St Joseph's in 1985 and became principal of the new joined college.

For his efforts he was made a Member of the Cathedral Chapter. In 1987, he was appointed as parish priest of St Paul's, on the Falls Road, at that time the largest parish in Down and Connor. He was made a Monsignor in 1988 and served as Vicar General of Down and Connor.

== Bishop ==
On 13 February 1994, Dallat was ordained Titular Bishop of Thala, and Auxiliary of Down and Connor. He took as his motto Mary's response to the Angel Gabriel's invitation, Fiat Voluntas Tua (Your Will be Done). During this period, he retained his interest in education and was Chairman of the Council for Catholic Maintained Schools (CCMS). He retired as bishop in March 2000 and died in September 2000.

== Other ==
One of Dallat's nephews, Fr Ciarán Dallat, came to the attention of the press and wider public in 2015 due to a sex scandal.

== Death ==
Bishop Dallat died on 25 September 2000 and was buried in Hannahstown Cemetery.
