= Eugene Magennis =

Eugene Magennis was at times Bishop of Down and Connor during the period from 1539 to 1563.

A Papal appointee from 1539, and already Archdeacon of Down, he accepted royal supremacy and was confirmed by letters patent on 8 May 1542. Magennis retained possession during the reign of Queen Mary I; and probably attended the 1560 parliament where he took the Oath of Supremacy.
