= Francis Lenny =

Irish Roman Catholic bishop

Francis Lenny (b. Cookstown 27 September 1928; d. Mullavilly 16 July 1978) was an Irish Roman Catholic bishop in the last third of the 20th century.

Lenny was educated at St Patrick's Grammar School, Armagh and St Patrick's College, Maynooth. He was ordained priest for Armagh on 21 June 1953. He was secretary to Cardinal's John Dalton and William Conway from 1955 to 1972. He was appointed parish priest of Mullavilly in 1972 and Auxiliary Bishop of Armagh in 1974.

He died on the fourth anniversary of his episcopal consecration from injuries received from an arson attack on his home.
