= Irish Catholic Bishops' Conference =

Assembly of Catholic bishops

- Comhdháil Easpag Caitliceach Éireann
- President: Eamon Martin
- Website: CatholicBishops.ie

The Irish Catholic Bishops' Conference (Irish: Comhdháil Easpag Caitliceach Éireann) is the episcopal conference of the Roman Catholic bishops in Ireland. The conference meets a number of times a year in Maynooth which is the location of St Patrick's College, Ireland's national seminary. While each bishop is autonomous in his own diocese, meetings of the conference give bishops a chance to discuss issues of mutual concern, or issues of national policy.

== Background ==
In the Catholic Church, an episcopal conference is an official assembly of all the bishops of a given territory. Episcopal conferences have long existed as informal entities, but were first established as formal bodies by the Second Vatican Council (Christus Dominus, 38), and implemented by Pope Paul VI's 1966 motu proprio Ecclesiae sanctae. The operation, authority, and responsibilities of episcopal conferences are currently governed by the 1983 Code of Canon Law (see especially canons 447–459). The nature of episcopal conferences, and their magisterial authority in particular, was subsequently clarified by Pope John Paul II's 1998 motu proprio Apostolos suos.

Certain tasks and authority are assigned to episcopal conferences, particularly with regard to setting the liturgical norms for the Mass. Episcopal conferences receive their authority under universal law or particular mandates. In certain circumstances, as defined by canon law, the decisions of an episcopal conference are subject to ratification from the Holy See. Individual bishops do not relinquish their authority to the conference, and remain responsible for the governance of their respective diocese.

The Conference owns the publisher and retailer Veritas Communications.

== Composition ==
The Irish Catholic Bishops' Conference is made up of the 26 Irish diocesan bishops (ordinaries) and a number of auxiliary bishops. The conference membership extends to both government jurisdictions on the island of Ireland, the Republic of Ireland and Northern Ireland.

== Structure ==
Beneath the Bishops' Conference are the regional or provincial meetings of bishops.

Episcopal conferences are generally defined by geographic borders, with all the bishops in a given country belonging to the same conference – which might also include neighboring countries.

The Archbishop of Armagh, as Primate of All Ireland, chairs the Conference.

Much of the work of the Conference is done in committees which cover issues such as laity, liturgy, family, social justice. Each committee is chaired by a bishop, though not always an ordinary.

== Presidency ==
By convention, the Archbishop of Armagh as the most-senior churchman in Ireland, presides and is the principal spokesman. This tradition has prevailed even when the Archbishop of Dublin is a cardinal and the Archbishop of Armagh is not a member of the College of Cardinals.

=== List of presidents ===
Portrait	Name	Took office	Left office
John D'Alton	John D'Alton	1958	1963
William Conway	William Conway	1963	1977
Tomás Ó Fiaich	Tomás Ó Fiaich	1977	1990
Cahal Daly	Cahal Daly	1990	1996
Seán Brady	Seán Brady	1996	2014
Eamon Martin	Eamon Martin	2014	Incumbent

== Political activity ==
=== Abortion ===
In keeping with Catholic views on abortion, the Conference campaigns against the legalisation of abortion. It called for a "Yes" vote in the 2002 abortion referendum which would have overturned the 1992 X Case judgement. It called the proposal "an opportunity not to be lost". The Conference condemned the Protection of Life During Pregnancy Act 2013.

== Extraordinary general meetings ==
- April 2002 – Ferns Report and resignation of Bishop Brendan Comiskey
- October 2005 – publication of the National Board for Safeguarding Children report on child protection in the Cloyne diocese
- January 2009 – publication of the National Board for Safeguarding Children report on child protection in the Cloyne diocese.
- Friday 22 January 2010 – anticipation of the forthcoming pastoral letter from Pope Benedict XVI to the faithful of Ireland after the Ryan and Murphy reports.

== See also ==
- Archbishops of Armagh - Primate of All Ireland (Catholic)
- Catholic Church in Ireland
