= Sacred theology =

Sacred theology is a term used in the Catholic Church to refer to theological studies:

Sacred theology rests on the written word of God, together with sacred tradition, as its primary and perpetual foundation. By scrutinizing in the light of faith all truth stored up in the mystery of Christ, theology is most powerfully strengthened and constantly rejuvenated by that word. For the Sacred Scriptures contain the word of God and since they are inspired, really are the word of God; and so the study of the sacred page is, as it were, the soul of sacred theology.

and the name given to the theological degrees offered in a number of theological colleges, including the Church's pontifical university system.

== Degrees ==
Degrees in sacred theology are offered at the following levels:

- Bachelor of Sacred Theology
- Master of Sacred Theology (also an honorary degree for established scholars among Dominicans)
- Licentiate of Sacred Theology (STL), the Roman Catholic equivalent of a Master's degree
- Doctor of Sacred Theology

== Lay students ==
Catholic institutes of higher education which do not possess a teaching faculty of sacred theology are directed by the church to establish "an institute or chair of sacred theology" so as to deliver teaching "suited to lay students".
