= Cahal Daly =

Irish Roman Catholic cardinal (1917–2009)

His Eminence Cahal Daly KGCHS
- Cardinal, Archbishop of Armagh; Primate of All Ireland
- Church: Catholic Church
- Archdiocese: Armagh
- Appointed: 6 November 1990
- Term ended: 1 October 1996
- Predecessor: Tomás Ó Fiaich
- Successor: Seán Brady
- Other post: Cardinal-Priest of San Patrizio
- Previous posts: Bishop of Ardagh and Clonmacnoise (1967–1982); Bishop of Down and Connor (1982–1990)

Orders
- Ordination: 22 June 1941
- Consecration: 16 July 1967 by William John Conway
- Created cardinal: 28 June 1991 by John Paul II
- Rank: Cardinal-Priest

Personal details
- Born: Charles Brendan Daly; 1 October 1917 Loughgiel, County Antrim, Ireland
- Died: 31 December 2009 (aged 92) Belfast, Northern Ireland
- Buried: St Patrick's Cathedral Cemetery, Armagh
- Denomination: Roman Catholic
- Education: St Malachy's College
- Alma mater: Queen's University Belfast (BA); St Patrick's College, Maynooth (DD)
- Motto: Jesus Christus Heri et Hodie
- Coat of arms

Cahal Brendan Daly KGCHS (born Charles Brendan Daly, 1 October 1917 – 31 December 2009) was a Roman Catholic cardinal, theologian and writer from County Antrim.

Daly served as the Catholic Primate of All Ireland and Archbishop of Armagh from late 1990 to 1996, the oldest man to take up this role for nearly 200 years. He was later created a Cardinal-Priest of S. Patrizio by Pope John Paul II in the consistory of 28 June 1991.

== Early life ==
Charles Brendan Daly was born in Ballybraddin, Loughguile, a village near Ballymoney in County Antrim, the third child of seven born to Charles Daly and Susan Connolly. His father was a primary school teacher originally from Keadue, County Roscommon, and his mother a native of Antrim. He was educated at St. Patrick's National School in Loughguile, and then as a boarder in St. Malachy's College, Belfast, in 1930. The writer Brian Moore was a near contemporary.

== Studies ==
Daly studied Classics at Queen's University in Belfast. He earned his (BA) with Honours and also the Henry Medal in Latin Studies in 1937 and completed his M.A. the following year. He entered St Patrick's College, Maynooth and was ordained to the priesthood on 22 June 1941. He continued studies in theology in Maynooth, from where he obtained a doctorate in divinity (DD) in 1944. His first appointment was as Classics Master in St. Malachy's College (1944–1945).

In 1945 he was appointed Lecturer in Scholastic Philosophy at Queen's University, Belfast, retaining the post for 21 years. In the academic year 1952–53 Queens granted him sabbatical leave, which he spent studying at the Catholic Institute of Paris where he received a licentiate in philosophy. He would return to France at many points, particularly for holidays. He persisted with his studies well into his retirement. He was a popular figure with the university and fondly remembered by his students. He was named a Canon of the Cathedral Chapter of Diocese of Down and Connor in 1966.

== Episcopate ==
Daly was a peritus, or theological expert, at the Second Vatican Council (1962–1965) to Bishop William Philbin during the first session of the Council and to William Cardinal Conway for the rest of the council. He dedicated himself to scholarship for 30 years, and published several books seeking to bring about understanding between the warring factions in Northern Ireland.

Daly was appointed Reader in Scholastic Philosophy at Queen's University in 1963, a post he held until 1967, when he was appointed Bishop of Ardagh and Clonmacnoise on 26 May.

Daly converted his forename Charles into Cahal ahead of his episcopal consecration in St. Mel's Cathedral, Longford, on 16 July 1967 from William Cardinal Conway, with Archbishop Giuseppe Sensi and Bishop Neil Farren serving as co-consecrators.

He spent 15 years as bishop in Longford and was diligent about parish visitation and confirmations gradually assumed a greater national profile. From 1974 onwards, he devoted himself especially to ecumenical activities for the Pontifical Council for Promoting Christian Unity. His pastoral letter to Protestants, written in 1979, pleaded for Christian unity.

Daly succeeded William Philbin as the 30th Bishop of Down and Connor when he was installed as bishop of his native diocese at a ceremony in St Peter's Cathedral, Belfast, on 17 October 1982.

== Cardinal ==
On 6 November 1990, Daly was appointed Archbishop of Armagh and, as such, Primate of All Ireland. His age made him an unexpected occupant of the post. Despite this it was requested that he stay in the role for three years before usual age of episcopal retirement at 75. Cardinal Daly took a notably harder line against the Irish Republican Army (IRA) than his predecessor, Tomás Cardinal Ó Fiaich.

Daly was respectful of Protestant rights, and opposed integrated education of Catholics and Protestants. This policy was criticised by those who saw segregated education as one of the causes of sectarianism in Northern Ireland, but was seen by the Catholic clergy as important for passing on their faith to future generations. He was utterly orthodox in opposing divorce, contraception, abortion, the ordination of women and any idea of dropping clerical celibacy.

He was heckled by the audience on live television during a broadcast of The Late Late Show on RTÉ One on the topic of paedophilia in the 1990s. After his retirement in 1996 he made no public statement on the issue.

Daly retired as Archbishop of Armagh on his 79th birthday, 1 October 1996, and subsequently suffered ill health. Although it was announced that he would attend the funeral of Pope John Paul II, he stayed home on the advice of his doctors. His age made him ineligible to participate in the 2005 conclave that elected Pope Benedict XVI.

His death in 2009 brought to an end a two-year period during which Ireland had, for the first time in its history, three living Cardinals.

In 1967 Daly took as his episcopal motto, "Jesus Christ, yesterday and today", taken from Hebrews 13:8 and his armorial bearings were a personalised variation of the arms of the Ó Dálaigh family. As Archbishop of Armagh he impaled them with those of the Archdiocese of Armagh.

== Declining health and death ==
Cardinal Daly was admitted to the coronary unit of Belfast City Hospital on 28 December 2009. His health had already been declining, leading to prayers being ordered for him. Dr Daly died in hospital in Belfast on 31 December 2009, aged 92. His family were at his bedside at the time.

In tributes, both Taoiseach Brian Cowen and former UK prime minister Tony Blair stressed Cardinal Daly's contribution to the peace process in Northern Ireland. The deputy First Minister of Northern Ireland, the Sinn Féin MLA Martin McGuinness, said it was no secret that Republicans and Cardinal Daly had never enjoyed a close relationship during The Troubles, but that relations had warmed since then. Warm tributes also came from the Primate of the Church of Ireland, the Most Rev. Alan Harper, the President of the Methodist Church in Ireland, the Rev. Donald P. Ker, and the Moderator of the Presbyterian Church in Ireland, the Rt. Rev. Dr. Stafford Carson.

He lay in state in Belfast and then his remains were taken to Armagh. Pope Benedict XVI paid tribute at this stage. Large numbers of people travelled from as far as County Westmeath to attend Mass at Armagh on 4 January, at which Monsignor Liam McEntaggart, the former parish priest of Coalisland, said, "When the history of peace making in Ireland comes to be written, the contribution of Cardinal Daly will be accorded a high place". Monsignor McEntaggart himself died on 22 August 2010, aged 81, less than eight months after Cardinal Daly's passing.

Daly's funeral was held on 5 January 2010, attended by the president Mary McAleese and Taoiseach Brian Cowen. Cardinal Daly was buried in the grounds of St Patrick's Roman Catholic Cathedral, Armagh next to his three predecessors in the see, Cardinals Ó Fiaich, Conway and D'Alton.

== Written legacy ==
In 2001, eight years before his death, Dr. Daly donated his entire set of writings to the Political Collection of the Linen Hall Library. His donation to the Library, which is bound in handsome volumes, includes 500 sermons, essays, addresses and press statements.

Cardinal Daly said at the time:

Where feelings run high and community resentments are strong on both sides, truth itself becomes an early casualty. St Paul wrote of speaking the truth in love, and that is what the Christian pastor must always seek to do. Whether or to what extent I succeeded in doing so is for others to judge, not me.

His collection Philosophy in Britain from Bradley to Wittgenstein and The Minding of Planet Earth was published in 2004.

Two of his speeches feature in Teachers of the Faith: Speeches and Lectures by Catholic Bishops, a book of international addresses by members of the clergy spanning 26 years.

== See also ==
- Roman Catholicism in Ireland

Catholic Church titles
Preceded by James Joseph MacNamee	Bishop of Ardagh and Clonmacnoise; 1967–1982	Succeeded by Colm O'Reilly
Preceded by William Philbin	Bishop of Down and Connor; 1982–1990	Succeeded by Patrick Joseph Walsh
Preceded by Tomás Ó Fiaich	Archbishop of Armagh and Primate of All Ireland; 1990–1996	Succeeded by Seán Brady
Preceded by Tomás Ó Fiaich	Cardinal-Priest of San Patrizio; 1991–2009	Succeeded by Thomas Christopher Collins
