= Peritus =

Invited expert at a church council

Peritus (Latin for "expert"; plural periti) is the title given to Roman Catholic theologians attending an ecumenical council to give advice. At the Second Vatican Council (also known as 'Vatican II'), some periti accompanied individual bishops or groups of bishops from various countries. Others were formally appointed advisers to the whole Council.

The periti of Vatican II, although their official status designated them as at the service of the council, were most often at the service of one of the two major currents which were counterposed at the Council: on the one hand, on the side of reforms in the church (in favor of ideas such as acceptance of religious freedom, revision of church–state relations, reassessment of relations with other religions); or, on the other hand, on the side of the 'traditionalists', who generally did not support changes to doctrine or to the ways in which the Church engaged in and with the world. This latter grouping espoused a continuing clash of Catholicism with certain other institutions and more 'modern' ideas and parts of society seen as problematic, as had been seen since at least the Councils of Trent and Vatican I (this was especially true for the experts close to the major grouping of traditionalists for Vatican II, Coetus Internationalis Patrum (Group of International Fathers)).

A leading reform-minded peritus, Fr (later Cardinal) Yves Congar served as a consultant to the council upon the invitation of Pope John XXIII, but was hired as personal and expert theologian (peritus) at the council to Bishop Jean-Julien Weber of Strasbourg. This allowed him to attend all the general sessions and participate in discussions of any Commission to which he was invited.

Periti from the United States at Vatican II were numerous. Altogether 109 US theologian experts were recognised over the four sessions of the Council.
