= Alan McGuckian =

Irish Catholic prelate (born 1953)

The Most Reverend Alan McGuckian SJ
- Bishop of Down and Connor
- Church: Catholic
- Diocese: Down and Connor
- Appointed: 2 February 2024
- Installed: 14 April 2024
- Predecessor: Noël Treanor
- Previous posts: Bishop of Raphoe; Director of the Living Church Office and Director of Formation for the Permanent Diaconate for the Diocese of Down and Connor; Editor of An Timire and Foilseacháin Ábhair Spioradálta; Chaplain at Ulster University; Director of the Jesuit Communication Office; Vocations Director for the Jesuits; Teacher at Clongowes Wood College

Orders
- Ordination: 22 June 1984
- Consecration: 6 August 2017 by Eamon Martin

Personal details
- Born: Alexander Aloysius McGuckian; 26 February 1953 (age 73) Cloughmills, County Antrim, Northern Ireland
- Parents: Brian and Pauline McGuckian
- Education: Queen's University Belfast; Regis College, Toronto; Milltown Institute of Theology and Philosophy; University College Dublin
- Motto: Et velle et perficere (Latin for 'To will and to do')
- Coat of arms

Styles of Alan McGuckian
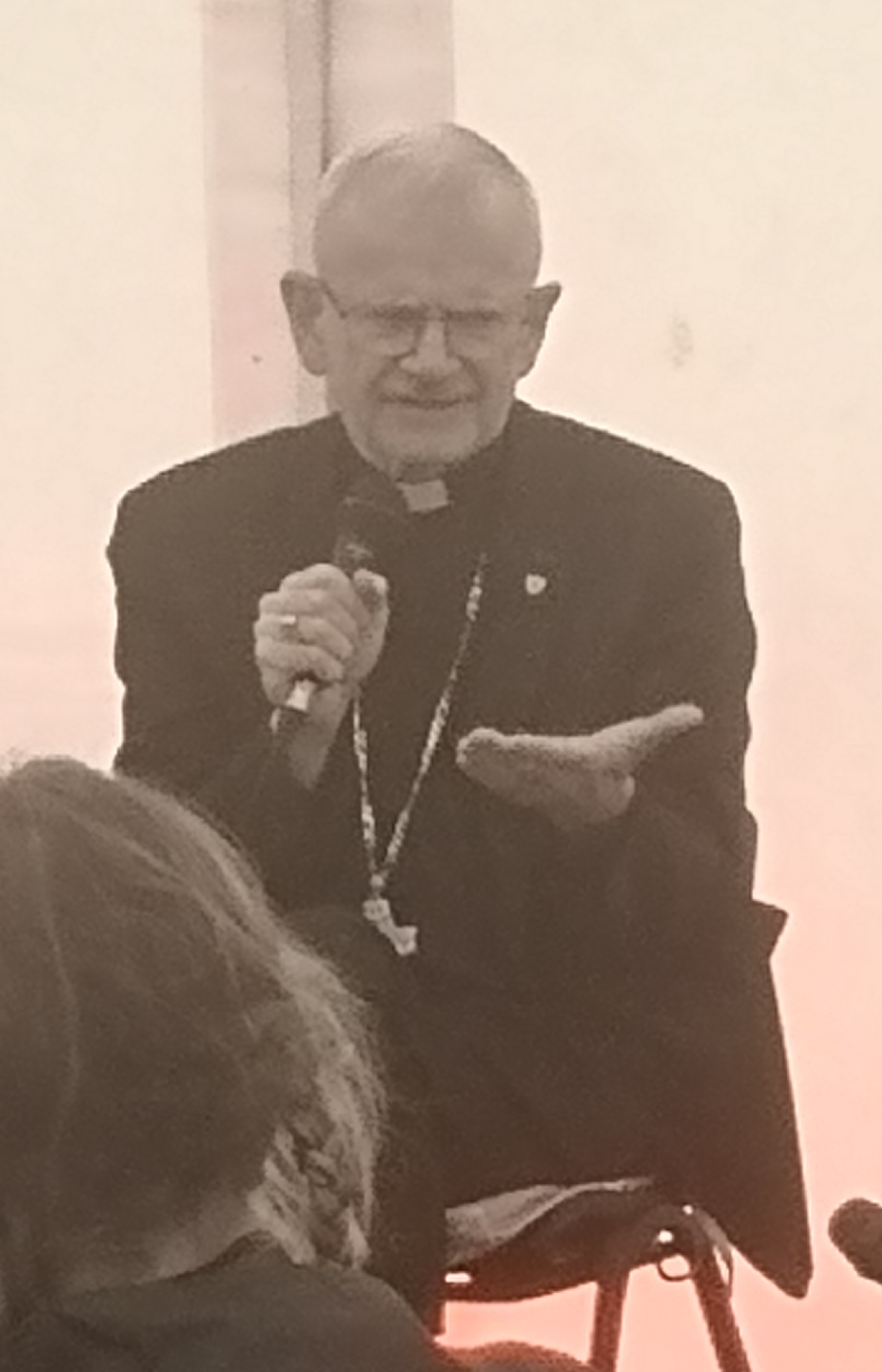
- Reference style: The Most Reverend
- Spoken style: My Lord
- Religious style: Bishop

Alexander Aloysius "Alan" McGuckian, SJ (born 26 February 1953) is an Irish prelate of the Catholic Church serving as the 33rd Bishop of Down and Connor in Northern Ireland.

== Early life and education ==
McGuckian was born on 26 February 1953 in Cloughmills, County Antrim, the youngest of six children to Brian McGuckian and his wife Pauline (née McKenna). He was named after his uncle, also Alexander Aloysius McGuckian, who died five months before he was born. Yet another uncle, Daniel McGuckian, was a priest of the Diocese of Down and Connor and served as Parish Priest of Cushendun and then Randalstown until his death in 1980. His father was a successful pig farmer who, alongside his brothers, developed the world's biggest pig farm.

Two of his brothers are also Jesuit priests, while another brother is a businessman and both of his sisters have predeceased him.

He attended primary school in Cloughmills and secondary school at St MacNissi's College, before beginning studies in Irish and scholastic philosophy at Queen's University, Belfast in 1971, where he was a near-contemporary of future brother bishop Dónal McKeown. McGuckian first visited Ranafast in 1968, and has since become a regular visitor to the Donegal Gaeltacht.

After one year in Belfast, McGuckian entered the Jesuit novitiate at Manresa House in Clontarf, Dublin, during which time he completed a Bachelor of Arts in Latin and Spanish from University College Dublin between 1974 and 1977, a Bachelor of Philosophy from Milltown Institute of Theology and Philosophy between 1977 and 1979, and a Master of Divinity and a Licentiate of Sacred Theology from Regis College, Toronto between 1981 and 1985. He subsequently completed a Master of Arts in Irish translation from Queen's University, Belfast.

He was ordained to the priesthood on 22 June 1984 and made his final profession on 15 February 1997.

== Religious ministry ==
Following ordination, McGuckian spent four years as a teacher in Clongowes Wood College and vocations director for the Jesuits, before undertaking a six-month period of spiritual renewal in southern India and serving in a shanty town in Quezon City, Philippines.

He returned to Ireland in 1992, where he was appointed director of the Jesuit Communication Centre, during which he developed Sacred Space, a website which allowed people to pray at their computer, in 1999, and the Catholic news service CatholicIreland.net in 2004.

McGuckian also served as editor of both An Timire and Foilseacháin Ábhair Spioradálta, later translating the autobiography of Ignatius of Loyola into Irish under the title Scéal an Oilithrigh. He also co-authored the drama 1912 - A Hundred Years On with Presbyterian historian Philip Orr in 2011, which looked at the experiences of the Ulster Covenant and the wider Home Rule movement from both nationalist and unionist perspectives.

McGuckian also served as chaplain to many of the Gaelscoileanna in the Diocese of Down and Connor, and subsequently as chaplain to Ulster University campuses in Belfast and Jordanstown. Following the publication of the Living Church Report, which outlined the findings of a synodal process within the diocese, he was appointed by Noël Treanor in 2012 to set up and lead the Living Church Office, whose aim was to realise the hopes and aspirations expressed in the report and subsequently in the upcoming diocesan pastoral plan.

McGuckian was also appointed diocesan director of formation for the permanent diaconate in 2014, and also worked during his directorship of the Living Church Office to establish pastoral communities across the diocese, through fostering a culture of co-responsibility for the mission of the Church between clergy and lay people.

== Episcopal ministry ==
=== Bishop of Raphoe ===

McGuckian was appointed Bishop-elect of Raphoe by Pope Francis on 9 June 2017. His appointment made him the first member of the Jesuits to be appointed a bishop in Ireland.

McGuckian was consecrated by the Archbishop of Armagh and Primate of All Ireland, Eamon Martin, on 6 August in the Cathedral of St Eunan and St Columba, Letterkenny. He uses the name and title Alan Mac Eochagáin, C. Í. when ministering in the Gaeltacht.

In an interview with The Irish Catholic in September 2019, McGuckian said that having a home is as fundamental as the right to life and education, and that the Government must be "pushed" to enshrine a right to housing in the Constitution of Ireland. He also joined a number of church leaders in the West of Ireland on 16 September 2021, in calling on the Irish government to offer reparations to homeowners whose properties were affected by defective concrete blocks.

In an interview with The Irish Catholic in February 2021, McGuckian took issue with the view held by political leaders that public worship was deemed to be "non-essential" during the COVID-19 pandemic in the Republic of Ireland. Quoting Pope Francis, who stated that "the right to worship must be respected, protected and defended by civil authorities like the right to bodily and physical health", he expressed a need to let political leaders know that public worship was not only central, but also "utterly essential".

Following a fatal explosion in Creeslough, County Donegal, on 7 October 2022, McGuckian referred to the explosion as "the darkest day in Donegal", adding that the local community was "living through a nightmare of shock and horror". He also concelebrated at the Funeral Masses of each of the victims, describing the fact that the parish church would be holding two funerals in the space of three hours as "surreal".

=== Bishop of Down and Connor ===
McGuckian was appointed Bishop of Down and Connor by Pope Francis on 2 February 2024. In his first address following his appointment, he expressed his hope that the restoring of the Northern Ireland Executive would help the most vulnerable in society.

Catholic Church titles
Preceded by Philip Boyce	Bishop of Raphoe since 2017	Succeeded by incumbent
