= Daniel Mageean =

Irish Roman Catholic prelate

The Most Reverend Daniel Mageean
- Bishop of Down and Connor
- Church: Catholic Church
- Diocese: Down and Connor
- In office: 1929–1962; (died)
- Predecessor: Joseph MacRory
- Successor: William Philbin
- Previous post: Senior Dean St Patrick's College, Maynooth

Orders
- Ordination: 17 June 1906
- Consecration: 31 May 1929 by Joseph MacRory

Personal details
- Born: 6 May 1882 Saintfield
- Died: 17 January 1962 (aged 79) Belfast, Northern Ireland

Styles of Daniel Mageean
- Reference style: The Most Reverend
- Spoken style: Your Lordship or Bishop
- Religious style: Bishop
- Posthumous style: not applicable

Bishop Daniel Mageean D.D. (6 May 1882 – 17 January 1962) was an Irish Roman Catholic prelate, who until 1962 served as the Lord Bishop of Down and Connor.

== Early life and priestly ministry ==
Daniel Mageean was born in the townland of Darragh Cross in the parish of Saintfield, County Down and received secondary education at St Malachy's College and St Patrick's College, Maynooth. He was ordained priest in 1906.

His older sister Mary (McCall) became the first President of the Apostolic Work in 1924 indicating the faith and commitment of his wider family where there were others vocations to religious life. While his mother was a sister of the late Dr Richard Marner, who served as President of St. Malachy's College from 1866 – 1876 and then Parish Priest of Kilkeel until his death in 1906.

His first pastoral appointment was a summer curacy in Glenavy parish in July 1907 and on 1 September that year he was transferred to St Malachy's College where he taught both English Literature and Latin and served as Dean of Discipline.

In 1919 Fr Mageean he appointed Junior Dean at St Patrick's College, Maynooth becoming Senior Dean in 1925.

== Episcopal ministry ==
On 31 May 1929 he was nominated Bishop of Down and Connor and received episcopal consecration in St Patrick's Church, Belfast on 25 August 1929.

In the 1930s he was a champion of Catholic rights especially after the anti-Catholic riots of 1935. He claimed that almost 400 Catholic families, totally nearly 1600 people had been driven from their homes. Dr. Mageean succeeded in getting the anti-Catholic nature of much of Northern Ireland life raised in the House of Commons at Westminster but his efforts came to naught and he resigned himself to a long period of sterility as prime ecclesiastical leader of demoralised Northern Irish Catholics.

A flavour of the struggles Bishop Mageean faced are considered in Jonathan Bardon's magisterial work on this history of Ulster. Bishop Mageean often used his Lenten Pastoral letter to address issues of wider social and political concern e.g. his 1938 letter on Partition and the persecution of Catholics in Northern Ireland.

In 1939, he coined the much-quoted phrase "A Protestant Parliament for a Protestant People", attributing it to his opponent Prime Minister Lord Craigavon, but that was a slight misquotation.

He died on 17 January 1962 and was succeeded by the Bishop of Clonfert, William Philbin.

The Mageean Cup awarded annually to the winners of the Ulster Colleges' Senior Hurling Championship is named after him.

== Notes ==
Catholic Church titles
Preceded by Joseph MacRory	Bishop of Down and Connor; 1929–1962	Succeeded by William Philbin
