= Roman Catholic Diocese of Down and Connor =

Latin Catholic diocese in Northern Ireland

Diocese of Down and Connor Dioecesis Dunensis et Connorensis Deoise An Dúin agus Chonaire

Catholic
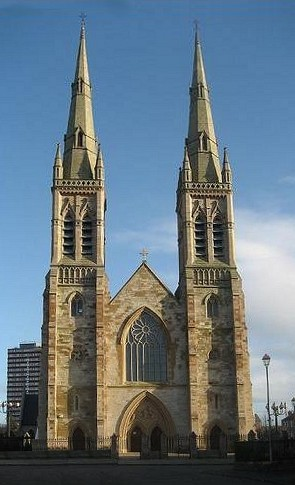
- St Peter's Cathedral, Belfast

Location
- Country: Northern Ireland
- Territory: Most of counties Antrim and Down and part of County Londonderry
- Ecclesiastical province: Province of Armagh
- Coordinates: 54.924°N 6.102°W

Statistics
- Area: 934 sq mi (2,420 km^{2})
- Population: Total; Catholics: (as of 2022); 991,000; 408,660 (41.2%)
- Parishes: 86

Information
- Denomination: Catholic Church
- Sui iuris church: Latin Church
- Rite: Roman Rite
- Established: 1453 (Union of the dioceses of Down and Connor)
- Cathedral: St Peter's Cathedral, Belfast
- Patron saint: St Malachy and St MacNissi
- Secular priests: 176

Current leadership
- Pope: Leo XIV
- Bishop: Alan McGuckian
- Metropolitan Archbishop: Eamon Martin
- Vicar General: Fr Eugene O'Hagan (The Priests) and Fr Michael McGinnity
- Judicial Vicar: Fr Joseph Rooney

Map
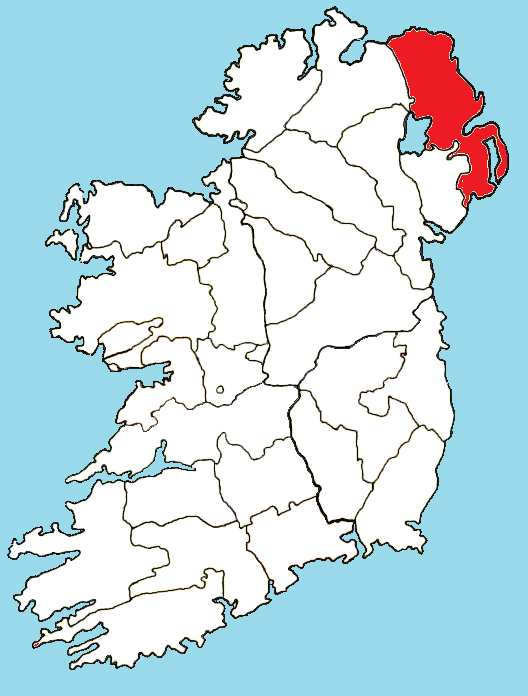

Website
- www.downandconnor.org

The Diocese of Down and Connor, (Latin: Dioecesis Dunensis et Connorensis; Irish: Deoise an Dúin agus Chonaire) is a Latin Church ecclesiastical territory or diocese of the Catholic Church in Northern Ireland. It is one of eight suffragan dioceses in the ecclesiastical province of the metropolitan Archdiocese of Armagh. The diocese is led by Bishop Alan McGuckian.

== Territorial remit ==
The territorial remit of the diocese includes much of counties Antrim and Down, including the cities of Belfast, Lisburn and Bangor, and the large towns Antrim, Ballymena, Carrickfergus, Downpatrick, Holywood, Larne and Newtownards. The population of the diocese is about one million, of which approximately 30% are Catholic with Sunday Mass attendance is estimated at 20%. There are currently 88 parishes and ministries in the diocese served by fewer than 100 priests, though the significance of individual parishes has been overtaken by the development of 'pastoral communities'. The diocese is Ireland's second largest in terms of population, after the Archdiocese of Dublin.

== History ==
St Fergus (died 583) was the first Bishop of Down. The Diocese of Connor was founded in 480 at Connor, County Antrim, by Mac Nisse. St. Malachy later became bishop in 1124. The dioceses of Down and Connor were permanently joined in 1439.

In 1670, as an effect of the Reformation, wars, and penal laws, in the whole of Down and Connor there were only 2,500 Catholic families. When at length the pressure of penal legislation was removed Catholicism revived rapidly.

In the period 1810–1840, a period of relaxation of the penal laws culminating in Catholic Emancipation, an estimated forty new churches were built, mostly in the rural parts of the diocese. This progress made under William Crolly (1825–1835) and Cornelius Denvir (1835–65) was continued as Belfast expanded as a city, under Patrick Dorrian (1865–86) and Patrick MacAlister (1886–95) and Henry Henry (1895–1908).

A diocesan chapter was erected in December 1920 in line with the 1917 Code of Canon Law. After Partition of Ireland it was one of only two Catholic dioceses to be wholly inside the new jurisdiction of Northern Ireland, the Catholic population at the time being estimated at 180,000 souls, served by 160 diocesan priests.

== Diocesan statistics ==
- Number of Catholics = 329,243
- Number of parishes = 86
- Number of churches = 151
- Number of priests in diocesan ministry = 131
- Number of permanent deacons in ministry (2018) = 9
- Number ordained (2018) = 1
- Number of retired priests = 44
- Seminarians = 8
- Number of brothers = 30
- Number of sisters = 243
- St. Mary's College of Education on roll = 994
- Number of primary & nursery schools = 164 (on roll = 32,306)
- Number of grammar schools = 12 (on roll = 10,795)
- Number of secondary school = 31 (on roll = 15,621)
- Baptisms = 4,096
- First communions = 4,740
- Confirmations = 5,207
- Marriages = 1,250

(The Down and Connor Directory)

=== City parishes ===
Listed are city parishes listed by the Diocese of Down and Connor.

- St Peter's Cathedral, Belfast
- St Patrick's Church, Belfast / Pro-Cathedral, Donegall Street, Belfast
- Christ the Redeemer, Lagmore
- Corpus Christi, Ballymurphy, Belfast
- St. Patrick's, Derriaghy
- Drumbo & Carryduff
- Hannahstown
- Holy Cross, Ardoyne
- Holy Family, Newington, Belfast
- Holy Rosary, Ormeau Road
- Holy Trinity, Turf Lodge
- Loughshore – Three parishes: St Mary's Greencastle, County Antrim, Star of The Sea Whitehouse, County Antrim and St James', Whiteabbey
- Nativity, Poleglass
- Our Lady Queen of Peace, Kilwee
- Sacred Heart, Glenview Street, Oldpark Road, Belfast
- St Agnes', Andersonstown, Belfast
- St Anne's, Kingsway/Upper Lisburn Road, Belfast
- St Anthony's, Willowfield, Woodstock Road, Cregagh, Belfast
- St Bernadette's, Rosetta Road, Castlereagh
- St Brigid's, Malone Road, Belfast
- St Colmcille's, Ballyhackamore and Dundonald areas of East Belfast
- St Gerard's, Antrim Road, Belfast
- St John's, Falls Road, Belfast
- St Luke's, Twinbrook
- St Malachy's, Alfred Street, Belfast
- St Mary's, Chapel Lane, Belfast
- St Mary's-On-The-Hill, Glengormley
- St Matthew's, Bryson Street, Short Strand, Belfast
- St Michael The Archangel, Finaghy Road North, Belfast
- St Oliver Plunkett, Glenveagh Drive, Glen Road, Belfast
- St Paul's, Falls Road, Belfast
- St Teresa's, Glen Road, Belfast
- St. Therese of Lisieux, Somerton Road, Belfast
- St Vincent De Paul, Ligoniel

=== Country parishes ===
Listed are country parishes listed by the Diocese of Down and Connor.

- Aghagallon & Ballinderry (St Patrick's)
- Ahoghill (St Marys Church; Ballynafie Road, Ahoghill)
- Antrim (St Comgall's and St Joseph's)
- Armoy (St. Olcan's)
- Ballintoy (St Mary's and St Joseph's)
- Ballycastle (St Patrick's & St Brigid's)
- Ballyclare & Ballygowan (Sacred Heart)
- Ballygalget (St Patrick's Church)
- Ballymena/Kirkinriola (All Saints and St Patrick's)
- Ballymoney & Derrykeighan (Our Lady & St Patrick's)
- Bangor (St Comgall's, Bangor; Most Holy Redeemer, Ballyholme; St Comgall's, Donaghadee)
- Carnlough (St John the Evangelist)
- Carrickfergus (St Nicholas')
- Castlewellan (under the patronage of St Malachy]
- Coleraine
- Crossgar
- Culfeightrin (Ballyvoy)
- Cushendall (St Patrick's) & Cushendun (St Patrick's, Craigagh & St Mary's "Star of the Sea", Culraney)
- Downpatrick (St Patrick's, Downpatrick; St Malachy's, Ballykilbeg; St Brigid's, Rathkeltair; St Colmcille's)
- Drumaroad & Clanvaraghan (St John the Baptist; Our Lady of the Angels)
- Dundrum & Tyrella
- Duneane (Moneyglass & Toome)
- Dunloy & Cloughmills
- Dunsford & Ardglass (St Nicholas', Ardglass; St Mary's, Dunsford)
- Glenariff
- Glenarm
- Glenavy & Killead
- Glenravel & The Braid
- Holywood
- Kilcoo (St Malachy's)
- Killough (St Patrick's, Legamaddy; St Joseph's, Killough; Star of the Sea, Rossglass)
- Killyleagh
- Kircubbin
- Larne
- Lisburn (under the patronage of St Patrick)
- Loughguile
- Loughinisland (St Macartan's)
- Lower Mourne
- Newcastle/Maghera (Our Lady of the Assumption, Newcastle; St Patrick's, Bryansford)
- Newtownards & Comber (St Patrick's Newtownards; Our Lady of the Visitation, Comber)
- Portaferry (St Patrick's, Ballyphilip; St Cooey's, Portaferry)
- Portglenone (Blessed Virgin Mary Immaculate)
- Portrush (St Patrick's)
- Portstewart (St Mary's Star of the Sea)
- Randalstown (St MacNissi's)
- Rasharkin (St Mary's)
- Saintfield & Carrickmannon
- Saul & Ballee (St Patrick's, Saul; St Joseph's, Downpatrick; St Tassach's, Carlin)
- Strangford (Star of the Sea)
- Upper Mourne

=== Ad limina visit 2006 ===
Bishop Patrick Walsh, Bishop Anthony Farquhar and Bishop Donal McKeown met with Pope Benedict XVI on the first morning of their visit. They spoke with the Pope for 20 minutes privately in which they discussed things like education, child sexual abuse, peace and reconciliation in Northern Ireland.

=== Ad limina visit 2017 ===
Bishop Treanor joined other Irish bishops in February 2017 for the ad limina visit. Unlike previous visits there were no private meetings with diocesan bishops and Pope Francis, rather the Pontiff spoke with the bishops together.

== Previous bishops ==
Ordinaries

The following is a basic list of the Roman Catholic bishops and vicars apostolic.

- John Fossade (1442–1450)
- Thomas Knight. O.S.B. (1453–1469)
- Tadhg Ó Muirgheasa (1469–1480)
- Tiberio Ugolino (1483–1519)
- Robert Blyth, O.S.B. (1520–1539)
- Eugene Magennis (1539–1559)
- Miler Magrath, O.F.M. (1565–1580)
- Donat O'Gallagher, O.F.M. (1580–1581)
- Bl. Conor O'Devany, O.F.M. (1582–1612)
- (Patrick Hanratty, vicar apostolic, 1614–1625)
- Edmund Dungan (1625–1629)
- Hugh Magennis, O.F.M. (1630–1640)
- (See vacant, 1640–1642)
- Heber MacMahon (1642–1643) Appointed Bishop of Clogher before his consecration as Bishop of Down and Connor could take place.
- Arthur Magennis, O.Cist. (1647–1653)
- (Michael O'Beirn, vicar apostolic, 1657–1670)
- Daniel Mackey (1671–1673)
- (See vacant, 1673–1711)
- (Terence O'Donnelly, vicar apostolic, 1711–unknown)
- James O'Shiel, O.F.M. (1717–1724)
- John Armstrong (1727–1739)
- Francis Stuart, O.F.M. (1740–1749)
- Edmund O'Doran (1751–1760)
- Theophilus MacCartan (1760–1778)
- Hugh MacMullan (1779–1794)
- Patrick MacMullan (1794–1824)
- William Crolly (1825–1835)
- Cornelius Denvir (1835–1865)
- Patrick Dorrian (1865–1885)
- Patrick MacAlister (1886–1895)
- Henry Henry (1895–1908)
- John Tohill (1908–1914)
- Joseph MacRory (1915–1928)
- Daniel Mageean (1929–1962)
- William Philbin (1962–1982)
- Cahal Brendan Daly (1982–1990)
- Patrick Joseph Walsh (1991–2008)
- Noel Treanor (2008–2022)
- Alan McGuckian (2024–present)

Auxiliary bishops

- Patrick Dorrian (1860–1865) (coadjutor)
- Patrick Walsh (May 1983 – 1991)
- Anthony Farquhar (May 1983 – December 2015)
- Michael Dallat (1993–2000)
- Donal McKeown (2001–2014)

== See also ==
- Diocese of Down and Dromore (Church of Ireland)
- Diocese of Connor (Church of Ireland)
- Roman Catholicism in Ireland
- List of Roman Catholic dioceses in Northern Ireland
- Apostolic Nuncio to Ireland
