= William Philbin =

Irish Roman Catholic bishop (1907–1991)

The Most Reverend Dr William Philbin
- Bishop of Down and Connor
- Church: Catholic
- See: Diocese of Down and Connor
- In office: 1962–1982
- Predecessor: Daniel Mageean
- Successor: Cahal Daly
- Previous post: Diocese of Clonfert (1954–1962)

Orders
- Ordination: 21 June 1931
- Consecration: 14 March 1954 by Joseph Walsh (archbishop of Tuam)

Personal details
- Born: 26 January 1907 Kiltimagh, County Mayo
- Died: 22 August 1991 (aged 84)
- Motto: Scio cui crédidi

William Joseph Philbin (26 January 1907 – 22 August 1991) was an Irish Roman Catholic prelate. From July 1962 until his retirement in 1982, he held the title Bishop of Down and Connor.

== Early life and priestly ministry ==
William Philbin was born in Kiltimagh in County Mayo in the west of Ireland on 26 January 1907.

At the age of 17 he went to St Patrick's College, Maynooth, and was ordained to the priesthood for service in the Diocese of Achonry on 21 June 1931. He spent most of his ministry as a professor at St Patrick's College, Maynooth, and was appointed to the Chair of Dogmatic Theology in June 1936.

As a student, Philbin was the editor of Leabhar Nuidheacht, published at Maynooth, and later, as professor, he was the joint editor of the Irish Theological Quarterly.

== Bishop of Clonfert ==
On 22 December 1953, Pope Pius XII appointed him 50th Bishop of Clonfert. He was consecrated Bishop in St Brendan's Cathedral, Loughrea, in March 1954. At the time he was seen as a daring, young, theologically engaged bishop and was invited to address many organisations and published several important lectures. In 1962 he wrote how economic growth, so vital to his poor Western diocese, would be stimulated by Ireland joining the EEC.

He attended all four sessions of the Second Vatican Council, both as Bishop of Clonfert and later still as Bishop of Down and Connor.

== Bishop of Down and Connor ==
On the death of Bishop Daniel Mageean in January 1962, Pope John XXIII appointed Dr Philbin the 29th Bishop of Down and Connor. His stewardship of the diocese was marked in very large part by the outbreak of the Troubles in the late 1960s.

Bishop Philbin was often on the media and spoke forcefully to the BBC when one his priests, Fr. Hugh Mullan, was shot dead as part of the Ballymurphy massacre in August 1971.

During his tenure he had a long-running dispute with Mullan's friend Fr. Des Wilson. Wilson reported that when he resigned his parish duties in protest against church policies he deemed inadequate or indifferent to needs of his working-class and republican community, Philbin accused Wilson of threatening to destroy the Church, denied him the pension to which he believed he was entitled, and never spoke to him again. When the dispute became public, Sinn Féin, characterised Philbin as being "completely in line" with the anti-republican War-of-Independence hierarchy, while praising Wilson for speaking out on "armed struggle, divorce, the papacy and education".

As a priest Wilson was not alone in his criticism. Fr Denis Faul concluded that in failing to "understand the suffering of his own people", Philbin conceded leadership by default to the Provisionals (described by the bishop as being "of the devil"). Fr Pat Buckley suggested that if the bishop had "led two hundred thousand people up the Falls Road demanding civil rights, the Provos might not have been necessary".

Despite the civil conflict, often presented as a war between Christians, Philbin was rigidly opposed to Catholic support for any form of integrated education and there was a long-running row with parents in his diocese over provision of the sacrament of Confirmation to children who did not attend Catholic schools.

It was believed that Philbin acted without broader Vatican support for his position, or even the support of his brother bishops in the rest of Ireland.

He retired at the mandatory age of 75 in 1982 and was succeeded as Bishop of Down and Connor by The Most Rev. Dr Cahal Daly, the then Bishop of Ardagh and Clonmacnoise, who had been Philbin's Peritus at the Second Vatican Council.

Bishop Philbin lived quietly in Dublin in retirement and died there on 22 August 1991. He is buried in St Peter's Cathedral, Belfast.

Catholic Church titles
Preceded by John Dignan	Roman Catholic Bishop of Clonfert; 1953–1962	Succeeded by Thomas Ryan
Preceded by Daniel Mageean	Bishop of Down and Connor; 1962–1982	Succeeded by Cahal Daly
