= List of Queen's University Belfast people =

This is a list of Queen's University Belfast people including notable alumni and staff of Queen's University Belfast, Northern Ireland. As one of only two universities in Northern Ireland, the university has been attended by a large proportion of the nation's professionals.

This list does not include people whose only connection with the university consists in the award of an honorary degree.

== Staff ==
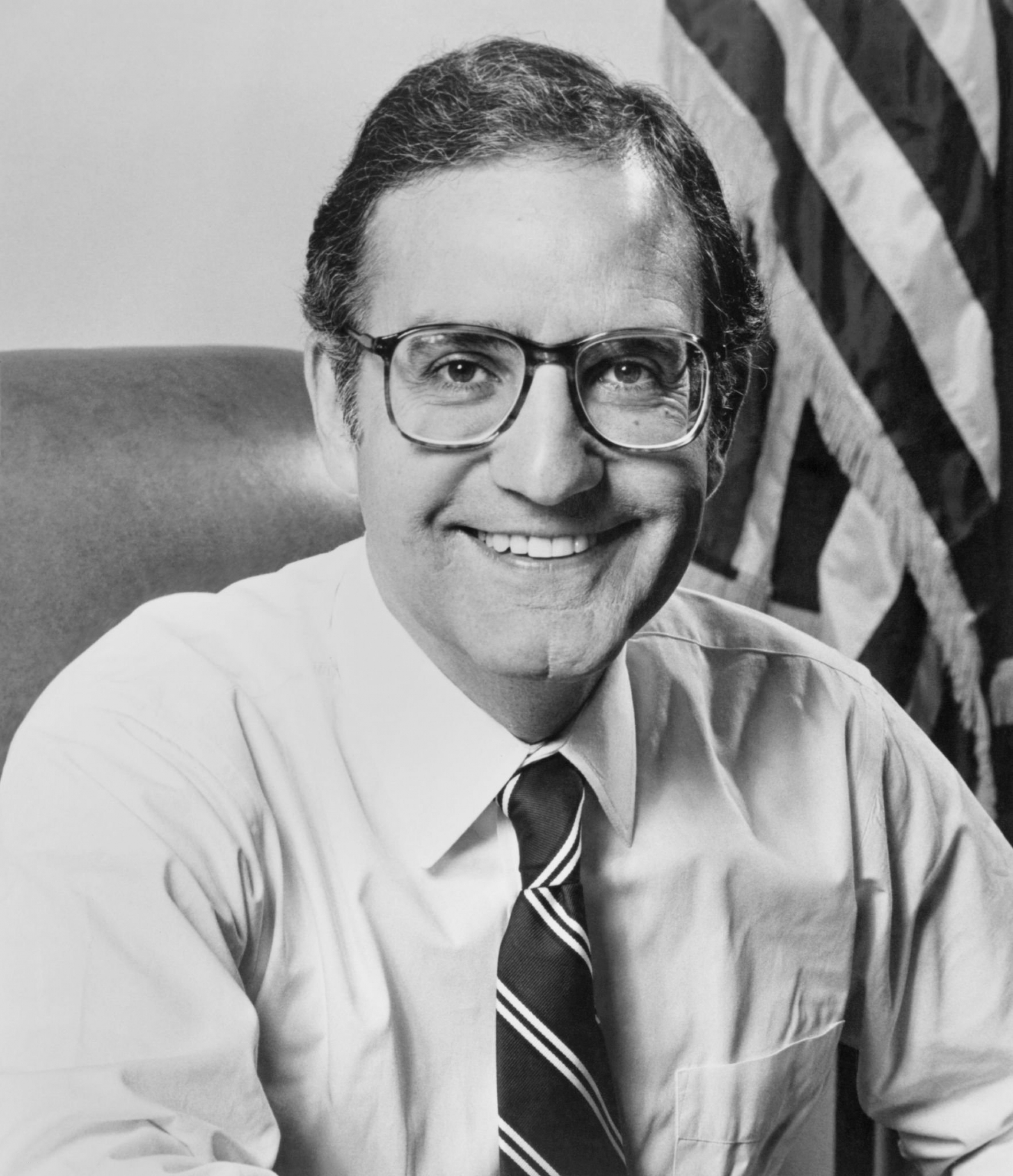
Former Queen's Chancellor George Mitchell

- Kathleen Mary Tyrer Atkinson – Professor of Ancient History and first woman professor at Queen's University
- Mike Baillie – Professor Emeritus of Palaeoecology
- Sir George Bain – former President and Vice-Chancellor; Chair of the Independent Review of the Fire Service
- Paul Bew, Baron Bew – Professor of Irish Politics
- Ciarán Carson – poet, novelist; Professor of English and Director of the Seamus Heaney Centre for Poetry
- Colin Cooper – Senior Lecturer in psychology; devises IQ tests for the BBC's Test the Nation programme
- Sir Bernard Crossland – former President of the Institution of Mechanical Engineers
- Edith Newman Devlin (1926–2012) former English lecturer, academic and writer
- Richard English – Professor of Politics
- Mick Fealty – Visiting Research Fellow at the Institute of Governance
- Theodore Thomson Flynn, served as the Chair of Zoology
- Sir Peter Gregson – former President and Vice-Chancellor
- Adrian Guelke – Professor of Comparative Politics
- Sir Charles Antony Richard Hoare - former Professor of Computing Science
- John Hewitt – the university's first writer-in-residence
- Thomas Jones – former Professor of Economics
- James Mallory – Professor in Prehistoric Archaeology
- Michael Mann – Visiting Research Professor in Sociology
- Sir John McCanny – Regius Professor of Electronics and Computer Engineering and Director of ECIT
- Sir William McCrea – former Professor of Mathematics
- Florence McKeown – former Professor of Morbid Anatomy
- George Mitchell – former Chancellor, former United States Senator
- Cornelius O'Leary – former Professor of Political Science
- Roger Penn – former professor of sociology
- Kamalesh Sharma – former Chancellor, former Commonwealth Secretary-General
- Raymond Warren – former Professor of Composition and Professor of Music
- John H. Whyte – former Professor of Political Science

== Alumni ==
=== Academia ===
- Hutton Ayikwei Addy – Professor of Public Health, first dean of the University for Development Studies Medical School
- Tan Sri Anuwar Ali – 2nd Vice-Chancellor of Open University Malaysia
- Sir George Vance Allen – 1st Vice-Chancellor of the University of Malaya
- William George Aston - historian and diplomat
- Sir David Bates – physicist
- Sir Colin Campbell – former Vice-Chancellor of the University of Nottingham
- Robert Henry Charles - theologian and translator
- Tan Sri Chin Fung Kee – former Vice-Chancellor of University of Malaya and Professor of Civil Engineering
- Art Cosgrove – former President of University College Dublin
- Roy Crawford – Vice-Chancellor of University of Waikato, New Zealand
- María Ester Grebe — ethnomusicologist
- Robert John Gregg (1912-1998) - Head of Department of Linguistics at University of British Columbia
- Colette Henry - social scientist and Head of Department of Business Studies at Dundalk Institute of Technology
- Elizabeth Wilhelmina Jones (1869–1959), headmistress of Harrogate Ladies' College
- Séamus Mac Mathúna - an Irish language and Irish literature scholar and university professor
- Matthew McDiarmid (1914–1996) – literature professor and campaigning academic; editor of the canonical Scottish Text Society editions of the poets Robert Fergusson and Blind Hary
- Gerry McKenna – former Vice-Chancellor and President of University of Ulster
- Florence McKeown – pathologist
- Joseph Mifsud – Maltese academic
- Pádraig Ó Tuama - poet and theologian
- David Joseph Patterson - biologist, University of Sydney, Australia.
- Philip Pettit - philosopher
- David Beers Quinn – author and historian
- Philipp Rosemann – philosopher and holder of the Chair of Philosophy at Maynooth University
- Rita Segato – anthropologist, feminist and academic
- Tan Sri Rafiah Salim – Vice-Chancellor of University of Malaya; former Assistant Secretary General for the United Nations Human Resource Management
- Robert N Moles – academic and legal researcher
- Brian Wilson - Professor of astrophysics; former and longest ever serving Vice-Chancellor of the University of Queensland

=== Arts and media ===
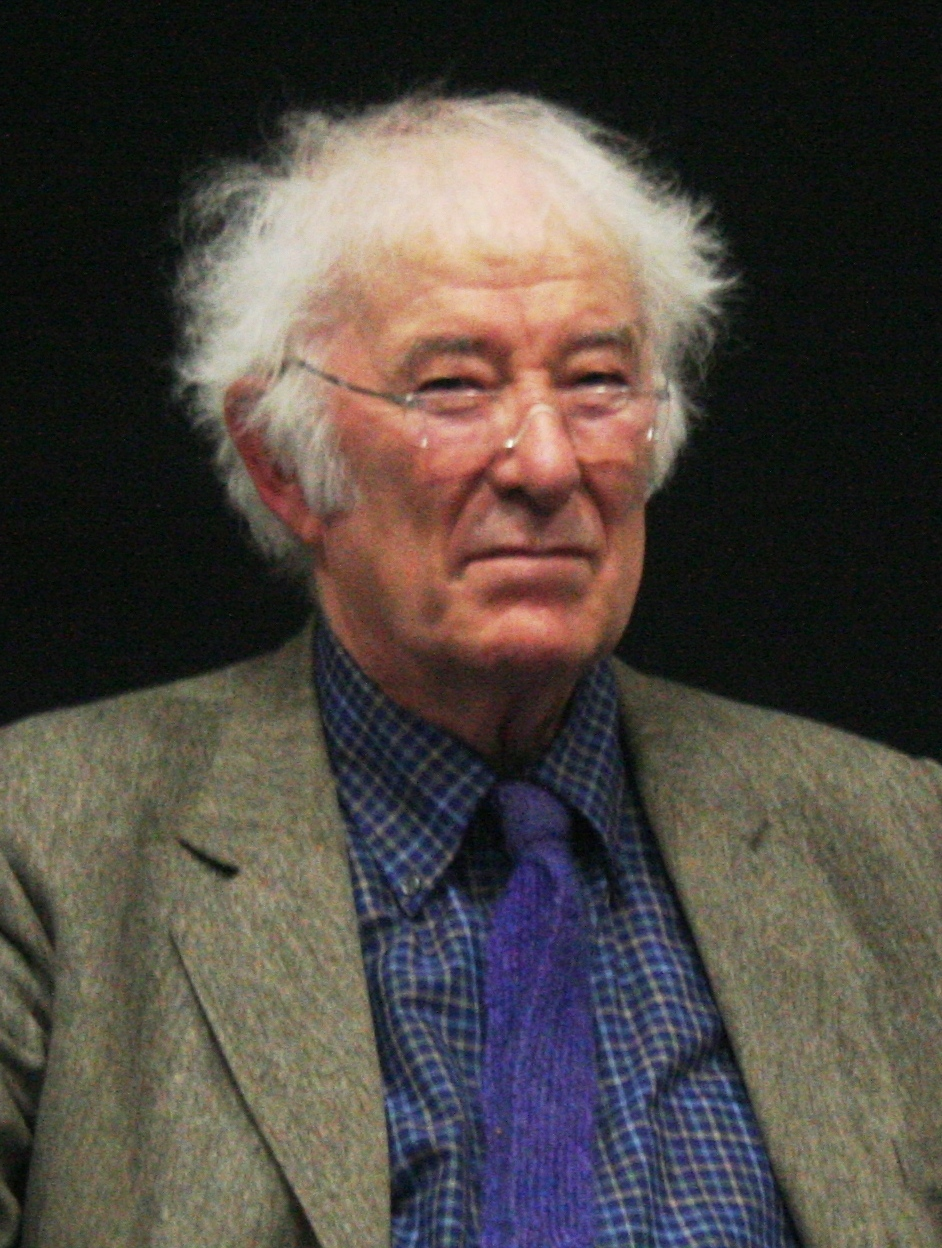
Poet and Nobel Laureate Seamus Heaney

- Stephen Nolan – broadcaster
- Andrew Beatty – journalist and editor
- John Boyd - playwright and radio producer
- Wesley Burrowes – playwright and screenwriter
- Kasia Glowicka – composer
- Edwin Lawrence Godkin – American publicist
- Kieran Goss – singer/songwriter
- Alan Green – BBC Radio 5 Live football commentator
- Rachael Hegarty – poet
- Seamus Heaney – Nobel Prize-winning poet
- Patrick Hicks – poet
- Joanne Hogg - singer/songwriter
- Patrick Kielty – television presenter
- Phil Kieran – club DJ
- Annie Mac – radio DJ
- Tony McAuley – broadcaster and musician
- Eamonn McCann – journalist and civil rights activist
- Ty McCormick – award-winning American foreign correspondent
- Lisa McGee – award-winning writer and director
- Paul Muldoon – Pulitzer Prize-winning poet
- Bill Neely – Journalist
- Liam Neeson – actor
- Donatus Nwoga – literary critic
- Éamon Phoenix - social and political historian and broadcaster
- Stephen Rea – actor
- Rigsy – radio and club DJ; television presenter
- Nick Ross – broadcaster
- Zöe Salmon – television presenter
- Mark Simpson – BBC Ireland correspondent
- Henry Vega – composer
- Helen Waddell – poet, translator and playwright
- Alexander Walker – journalist, author and film critic

=== Legal, military and civil service ===
- Hulusi Akar – 29th Chief of the General Staff of the Turkish Armed Forces
- Air Commodore David Case – British Armed Forces' most senior black officer
- Colonel Tim Collins – former Colonel in the British Army, known for his inspirational speech during the Iraq War in 2003
- Sir Ronnie Flanagan – Her Majesty's Chief Inspector of Constabulary; former Chief Constable of Police Service of Northern Ireland and Royal Ulster Constabulary
- Sir Robert Hart, 1st Baronet – Inspector General of the Chinese Imperial Maritime Customs
- Brian Hutton, Baron Hutton – former British Law Lord and Chair of the Hutton Inquiry
- Dame Siobhan Keegan - Lord Chief Justice of Northern Ireland.
- Brian Kerr, Baron Kerr of Tonaghmore – former Lord Chief Justice of Northern Ireland; Justice of the Supreme Court of the United Kingdom; the youngest and the only Justice who is not graduated from Oxbridge
- Joseph Henry Longford – British consul in Japan and academic
- Dame Denise McBride - First female High Court judge in Northern Ireland.
- John MacDermott, Baron MacDermott – Lord Chief Justice of Northern Ireland
- Edward Macnaghten, Baron Macnaghten – former British Law Lord and politician
- Eoin MacNeill – Founder of the Gaelic League
- Monica McWilliams – Chief Commissioner of the Northern Ireland Human Rights Commission; co-founder of the Northern Ireland Women's Coalition; former Professor of Women's Studies and Social Policy at the University of Ulster
- Sir Andrew Porter, 1st Baronet – former Master of the Rolls and Attorney General for Ireland
- Sir James Russell – Chief Justice of Hong Kong
- Sir Barry Shaw – first Director of Public Prosecutions for Northern Ireland
- Paul Tweed – media lawyer
- Air Vice Marshal Sir William Tyrrell – Irish Rugby international; member of first official British Isles Rugby team in 1910, decorated military officer; surgeon to King George VI of the United Kingdom
- Sir Hiram Shaw Wilkinson – Chief Justice of the British Supreme Court for China and Corea

=== Politicians ===
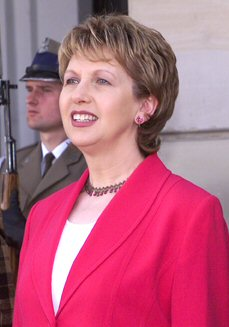
Irish President Mary McAleese

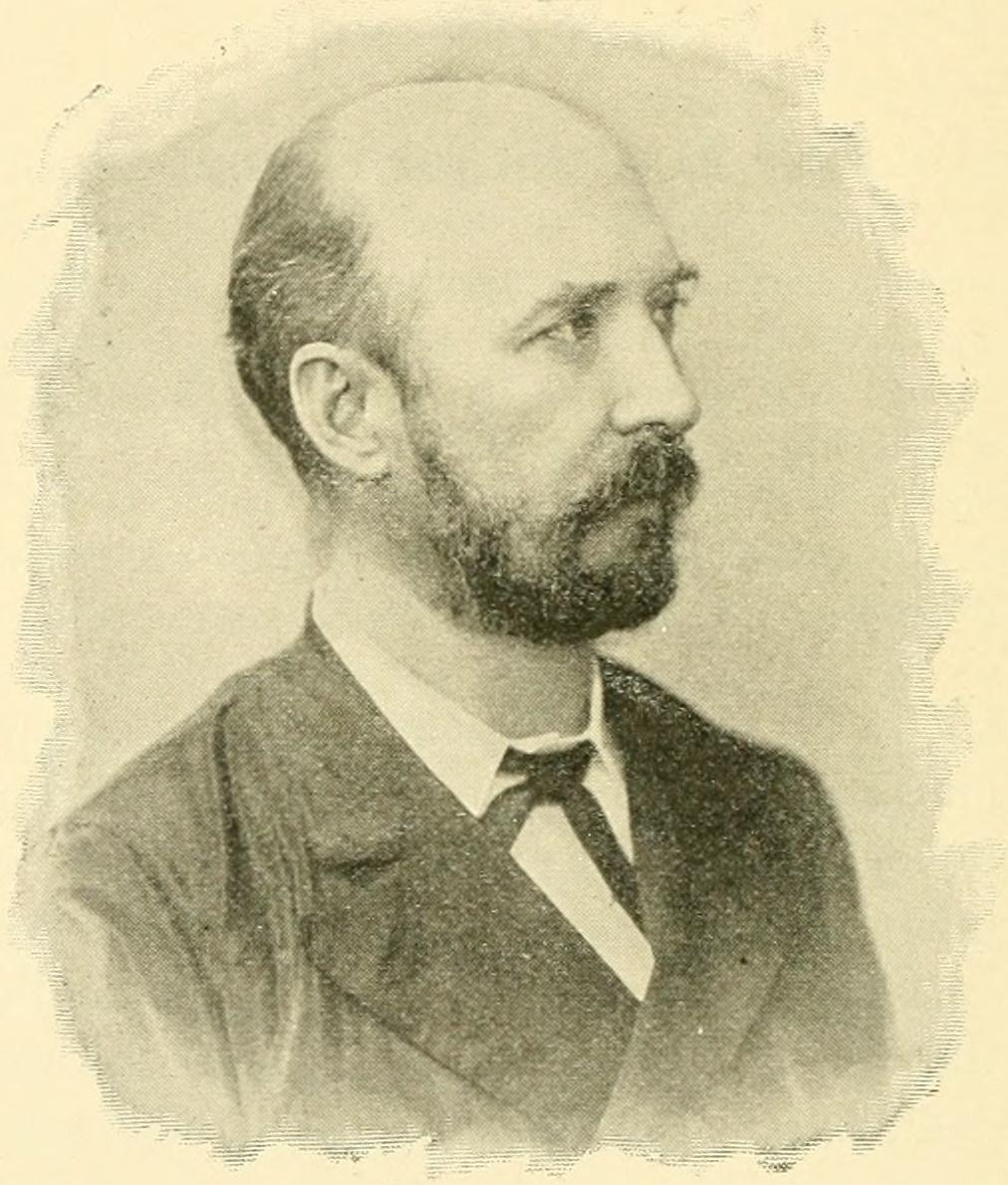
British diplomat Sir Robert Hart

- John Alderdice, Baron Alderdice – former Leader of the Alliance Party of Northern Ireland; former Presiding Officer of the Northern Ireland Assembly; consultant psychotherapist
- Jim Allister – leader of Northern Ireland's Traditional Unionist Voice Party
- Clare Bailey – Green Party leader and MLA for Belfast South
- Dominic Bradley – Social Democratic and Labour Party MLA for Newry and Armagh
- Diane Dodds – Democratic Unionist Party MLA for West Belfast
- Nigel Dodds – Barrister and Democratic Unionist Party MP for North Belfast
- Mark Durkan – Former Social Democratic and Labour Party MP for Foyle; former Leader of the SDLP; Former Deputy First Minister of Northern Ireland
- Reg Empey – former Leader of the Ulster Unionist Party
- Toiréasa Ferris – Sinn Féin politician; first female Mayor of Kerry; first Sinn Féin Chairperson of Kerry County Council
- Arlene Foster, Baroness Foster of Aghadrumsee – Former Democratic Unionist Party MLA for Fermanagh and South Tyrone; Former First Minister of Northern Ireland
- Simon Hamilton – Democratic Unionist Party MLA for Strangford
- Tun Lim Keng Yaik – former Energy Minister of Malaysia
- Naomi Long – Leader of the Alliance Party; Minister of Justice and former Lord Mayor of Belfast
- Brian Mawhinney – former MP and Chairman of the Conservative Party (UK)
- Mary McAleese – former President of Ireland
- Nelson McCausland – Former Democratic Unionist Party MLA for North Belfast;
- Brian McConnell, Baron McConnell – former Ulster Unionist MP
- Michelle McIlveen – Democratic Unionist Party MLA for Strangford
- Sheelagh Murnaghan – former Ulster Liberal Party MP
- Gearóid Ó Cuinneagáin – Irish fascist and leader of Ailtirí na hAiséirghe
- Ian Paisley Jr – North Antrim MLA for Democratic Unionist Party
- Janil Puthucheary – Minister of State, Ministry of Communications and Information Singapore, PAP MP for Punggol Coast
- Tun Ramli Ngah Talib – 9th Governor of Penang
- Tengku Razaleigh Hamzah – former Minister of Finance (Malaysia)
- John P Savage – Premier of Nova Scotia
- Eóin Tennyson – Alliance Party MLA for Upper Bann
- David Trimble – former First Minister of Northern Ireland and Nobel Peace Prize winner
- Peter Weir, Baron Weir of Ballyholme – Democratic Unionist Party MLA for North Down
- Jim Wells – Democratic Unionist Party MLA for South Down
- Sammy Wilson – Democratic Unionist Party MP for East Antrim
- Ali Shaath – Chair of the Palestinian National Committee for the Administration of Gaza, former Deputy Minister of Transportation of the Palestinian Authority, and civil engineer

=== Religion ===
- Anthony Farquhar – Auxiliary Bishop of Down and Connor; Assistant Chaplain of the University 1970–1975
- Cahal Daly – Archbishop Emeritus of The Archdiocese of Armagh – former lecturer; Reader in Scholastic Philosophy, 1946–1967
- James McEvoy – emeritus chair of scholastic philosophy (1943–2010)
- Donal McKeown – Auxiliary Bishop of Down and Connor
- Morris S. Seale – theologian
- Patrick Walsh – Bishop Emeritus of Down and Connor; Catholic Chaplain of the University 1963–1970

=== Science ===
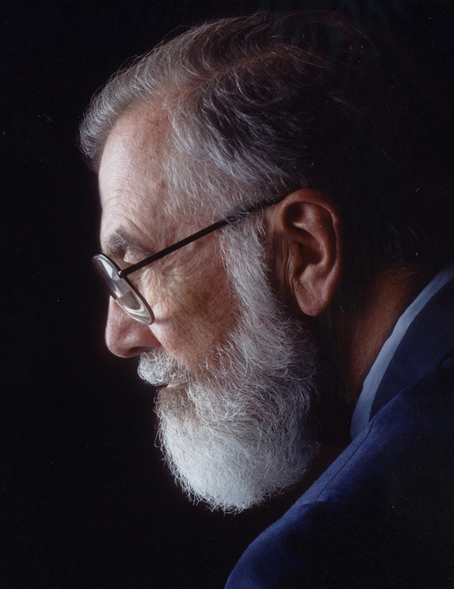
Physicist H. Douglas Keith

- John Bodkin Adams – physician and suspected serial killer
- Dame Ingrid Allen – neuropathologist and multiple sclerosis researcher
- John S. Bell – physicist and developer of Bell's Theorem, regarded by some in the quantum physics community as one of the most important theorems of the 20th century
- John Edward Campbell – mathematician, academic and co-developer of the Baker-Campbell-Hausdorff formula
- Kate Devlin, computer scientist
- Thomas Henry Flewett – virologist who suggested the name Rotavirus to the virus which is most common cause of diarrhoeal disease
- Erwin Gabathuler - particle physicist
- Terence Ingold – mycologist and botanist
- Henrik Kacser – biochemist and geneticist
- H Douglas Keith – polymer research scientist
- Lavinia Loughridge – physician and nephrologist
- Domhnall MacAuley – physician, medical academic, and medical journal editor
- Daniel McCaughan – physicist, engineer and industrialist
- Mollie McGeown – physician, nephrologist and health service pioneer
- Frank Murray (1912-1993) - physician; interned in Japanese POW camps in Singapore and Japan
- Frank Pantridge – inventor of the portable defibrillator
- Peter Rice – structural engineer
- Jonathan Scott - zoologist and wildlife photographer.
- Leslie Skene – psychiatrist
- Margarita Dawson Stelfox (née Mitchell) - botanist
- Isobel Addey Tate – World War I doctor
- Alfred R. J. P. Ubbelohde – Professor of Chemistry
- George P. L. Walker – geologist and vulcanologist
- William Parkinson Wilson – mathematician and founder of astronomical observatory
- Richard Henry Yapp - botanist

=== Sport ===
- David Cullen – 2007 winner of the Arthur Ashe for Courage Award at the 2007 ESPY Awards ceremony
- Thomas MacDonald (1908–1998) – cricketer
- Martin O'Neill – former footballer and former Leicester City, Celtic and Aston Villa manager who studied law at Queen's before being scouted by Nottingham Forest
- Trevor Ringland – former Ireland and British Lions rugby player, 2007 winner of the Arthur Ashe for Courage Award at the 2007 ESPY Awards ceremony
- Air Vice Marshal Sir William Tyrrell – Irish Rugby international, member of first official British Isles Rugby team in 1910, decorated military officer, and surgeon to King George VI of the United Kingdom

=== Other ===
- Kafeel Ahmed – suspected terrorist in the 2007 Glasgow International Airport attack
- Eamon Collins – former Provisional IRA member who later wrote a tell all book about life in the IRA
- Adam McGibbon - environmentalist and writer
- Michael McGoldrick – murder victim during The Troubles
- Laurence McKeown – former Provisional IRA member who took part in the 1981 Irish hunger strike

== See also ==
- List of chancellors of Queen's University Belfast
- List of vice-chancellors of Queen's University Belfast
