= Barry Kelly =

Barry Kelly may refer to:

- Barry Kelly (canoeist) (born 1954), Australian Olympic flatwater canoeist
- Barry Kelly (footballer) (1942–2008), Australian rules footballer
- Barry Kelly (physician) (1961–2025), radiologist from Northern Ireland
- Barry Kelly (referee) (born 1970), Irish hurling referee

== See also ==
- Barry Kelley (1908–1991), actor
- Barry & Sandra Kelly Memorial Novice Hurdle, a National Hunt race in Ireland
