= Hannaway =

Hannaway is a surname of Irish origin that is prevalent throughout the British Isles. Notable people with the surname include:

- Jack Hannaway, (1927–2007) English footballer
- Owen Hannaway, (1939–2006) Scottish historian
- Anne Hannaway, (192?–1992) wife of Gerry Adams Sr. and mother of Irish politician and former President of Sinn Féin Gerry Adams
- John Hannaway, (born 1958) Irish senior accountant
