= James Dunwoody =

James Dunwoody (1935–2012) was a university professor of mathematical engineering.

James Dunwoody was born in Belfast in October 1935. He attended St. Mary's Christian Brothers' Grammar School, Belfast, and then Queen's University Belfast, from which he graduated with a degree in mechanical engineering. He worked for a period as an apprentice aircraft engineer at Short Brothers before returning to Queen's, where he obtained a PhD in computational fluid dynamics. He moved to Canada, where he became a professor of applied mechanics at the University of Toronto.

After a short period at the National Physical Laboratory in Teddington, Middlesex, he returned to Queen's, initially as professor of theoretical mechanics and then as professor of applied mathematics and theoretical physics. He retired in 1996.

He established two scholarships at Queen's. These are known as the Dunwoody Scholarships and are awarded to students from one of the three Christian Brothers’ Schools in Northern Ireland entering the Faculty of Engineering and Physical Sciences at Queen's.

He died on 24 January 2012.
