= Bartley =

Bartley is a family name and a given name. Notable people with the name include:

== Surname ==
- Ashley Bartley, American politician from Vermont
- Barrington Bartley (born 1980), Jamaican-American cricketer
- Charles Bartley (1921–1996), American scientist
- David M. Bartley (1935–2023), American politician and educator
- Dick Bartley (born 1951), American radio disc jockey active 1969–2016
- Edward Bartley (1839–1919), New Zealand architect
- Ephesians Bartley (born 1969), American football player
- Frank Bartley (born 1994), American basketball player for Ironi Ness Ziona of the Israeli Basketball Premier League
- Geoff Bartley (born 1948), American singer/songwriter active 1969–present
- George Bartley (1782?–1858), English comedic actor
- Jonathan Bartley (born 1971), English politician
- Gerald Bartley (1898–1974), Irish politician
- John Bartley (1947–2025), American cinematographer
- Kace Bartley (born 1997), English squash player
- Kyle Bartley (born 1991), English footballer
- Leonard Bartley (born 1971), Jamaican musician known as Merciless
- Les Bartley (1954–2005), Canadian lacrosse coach
- Luella Bartley (born 1974), English fashion designer and editor
- Mordecai Bartley (1783–1870), American politician
- Patrick Bartley (1909–1956), British civil servant and politician
- Rook Bartley, fictional character in the science fiction franchise Robotech
- Robert L. Bartley (1937–2003), American editor
- Thomas Bartley (disambiguation), several people
- William Bartley (politician) (1801–1885), lawyer in South Australia
- William Warren Bartley (1934–1990), American philosopher and author

== Given name ==
- Bartley Campbell (1843–1888), American playwright
- Bartley Crum (1900–1959), American lawyer
- Bartley Fahey (1836–1920), a member of the Queensland Legislative Council
- Bartley Christopher Frueh (born 1963), American clinical psychologist
- Bartley Gorman (1944–2002), British Romani bare-knuckles boxing champion
- Bartley P. Griffith (born 1949), American heart surgeon
- Bartley Powell (1920–1977), British graphic designer
- Bartley Wilson (1870–1954), English artist
