= Misisi =

Suburb of Lusaka, Zambia

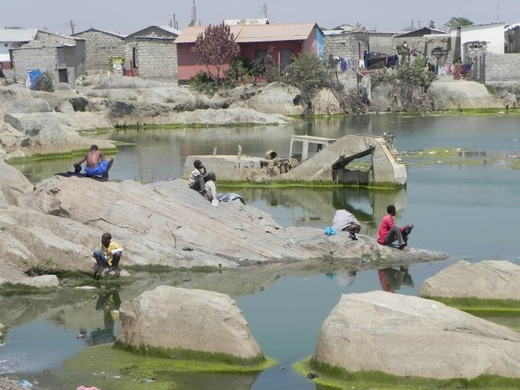
Misisi in 2011

Misisi Compound is a shanty town or komboni located in Lusaka, Zambia. In 2008, it was estimated to have 10,000 inhabitants. Plans for redevelopment were announced by President Edgar Lungu in 2019.

== Foundation ==
Misisi was established in the mid 1960s as a shanty town or komboni located beside the Kafue Road, three kilometres south of the central business district of Lusaka, Zambia. The name Misisi came from the Nyanja word for "Mrs" which referred to Mrs Edwards, the owner of the farmland which was originally squatted. The first inhabitants lived in shacks made from mud, poles and grass roofs.

== Living situation ==
At first, water supply was a difficulty, but as of 2014 the Lusaka Water and Sewerage Company (LWSC) would rather connect people to the supply than risk the spread of disease. In 2008, it was estimated to have 10,000 inhabitants.

Health problems result from factors such as overcrowding, bad sanitation and lack of transport and employment opportunities. Poor drainage of sewage leads to outbreaks of cholera. Lack of proper drainage also leads to regular flooding. Misisi is ranked as one of the five worst slums in Sub-Saharan Africa.

== Project Zambia ==
Misisi is one of the main places in which Project Zambia works. Much of the work takes place in the adjoining St Lawrence's Centre, which houses the Home of Hope, an outreach programme removing street children from Lusaka and offering them a safe haven and attempting to reunite them with their families, a Community School, bakery, Agricultural Project for a few examples, but a significant amount also takes place in the compound itself, such as the provision of clean water. Project Zambia also works in the St Catherine's Centre, in the middle of Misisi; it is a school offering education to local children of Misisi. Project Zambia's continued work in the St Catherine's Centre, with the work of Mr Peter Tembo, the co-ordinator of the St Catherine's centre, has seen its expansion from a few buildings acting as a temporary school, to a walled compound that has continued expansion with each year that Project Zambia continues its involvement.

== Redevelopment ==
In 2019, President Edgar Lungu announced plans to redevelop the Misisi and Chibolya settlements. They were one of four initiatives submitted to the Abu Dhabi Fund for Development. Whilst residents were concerned about eviction, Minister of Housing and Infrastructure Development Ronald Chitotela announced that under the Urban Renewal plans, the government would build 12,500 housing units in Misisi and also Kuku, which would house 50,000 people.
