= Bartley (disambiguation) =

Bartley is a family name and a given name.

Bartley may also refer to:

- Bartley MRT station, an MRT station on the Circle line in Joo Seng, Toa Payoh, Singapore
- Bartley Secondary School, a school in Singapore
- Bartley, Hampshire, England, UK
- Bartley Green, an area in Birmingham, England, UK
- Bartley Reservoir, a reservoir in Birmingham, England, UK
- Bartley Water, a stream in Hampshire, England, UK
- Bartley, Nebraska, U.S.
- Bartley, West Virginia, U.S.
