= Muredach Dynan =

Northern Irish educator (1938–2021)

Muredach Benedict Camillas Dynan (1938–2021) was a university professor and senior academic administrator.

== Career ==
Dynan was born in Belfast in 1938 where he attended St Mary's Christian Brothers' Grammar School, Belfast. He then proceeded to Queen's University Belfast from which he was awarded a first class honours degree in physics, coming first in his year group.

After graduation he taught for a period at St Dominic's Grammar School for Girls, Belfast before obtaining a post of lecturer at St. Mary's Teacher Training College, Belfast.

In 1976, he emigrated to Australia, where he obtained a PhD in education from Murdoch University in 1985 for a thesis on curriculum innovation. In 1986, he was appointed deputy principal to the then Catholic College of Education Sydney, New South Wales and in 1990 appointed as acting principal. In 1991, the Australian Catholic University was established by joining the Sydney college with colleges in Melbourne, Brisbane and Canberra. Dynan was confirmed as principal of the New South Wales Division. In 1995, he was appointed as ACU's first pro-vice-chancellor, located in Brisbane and with responsibility for quality assurance and outreach, a role he held until 2003. On retirement he was granted the title of emeritus professor.

In 2004, he returned to live in Newry, Northern Ireland. He became the inaugural chair of the board of directors of Edmund Rice Schools Trust, Northern Ireland. He was also appointed a board member of the Education Authority.

== Awards ==
- 1989: Knight of the Equestrian Order of the Holy Sepulchre of Jerusalem
- 2004: Professor emeritus, Australian Catholic University
- 2020: Edmund Rice Medal
