= Richard McLaughlin =

Richard McLaughlin may refer to:

- Richard McLaughlin (lawyer) (born 1947), High Court judge in Northern Ireland
- Richard E. McLaughlin (1915-1993), Massachusetts government official
