= Patrick Agnew =

Patrick or Paddy Agnew may refer to:

- Sir Patrick Agnew, 1st Baronet (c. 1578–1661), Member of Parliament for Wigtownshire, 1628–1633 and 1643–1647
- Patrick Alexander Agnew (1765–1813), governor of British Ceylon, 1795–1796
- Patrick Alexander Vans Agnew (1822–1848), British civil servant of the East India Company
- Sir Patrick Agnew (civil servant, born 1868) (1868–1925), British civil servant and judge in India
- Paddy Agnew (Stormont MP) (1878–?), Northern Ireland Labour Party MP for South Armagh 1938–1945
- Paddy Agnew (rugby union) (1942–2019), Irish rugby union player
- Paddy Agnew (Irish republican) (born 1955), former IRA volunteer elected to the Dáil Éireann during the 1981 Irish Hunger Strike
