= McCavana =

McCavana is a surname of Irish origin. Notable people with the surname include:

- Declan McCavana (born 1963), Northern Irish scholar and professor
- Terry McCavana (1922 – 2015), Northern Irish footballer
