= Thomas Frawley =

Northern Irish health service executive and ombudsman (1949–2026)

Thomas Jude Frawley CBE
- Born: 4 February 1949; Limerick, Ireland
- Died: 24 June 2026 (aged 77)
- Education: St. Mary's CBGS; Trinity College Dublin
- Occupations: Health service executive; Ombudsman
- Known for: Northern Ireland Ombudsman (2001–2016)
- Awards: Honorary Fellow of the Royal College of Nursing (2014)

Thomas Jude Frawley, CBE (4 February 1949 – 24 June 2026) was a health service executive and ombudsman, notable for his early appointment as a senior officer of one of the health boards of Northern Ireland.

== Life and career ==
Thomas Frawley was born in Limerick, Ireland on 4 February 1949. His family then moved to Belfast where he studied at St. Mary's Christian Brothers' Grammar School, Belfast. Frawley then attended Trinity College Dublin.

Frawley worked for several health authorities before being appointed chief administrative officer of the Western Health and Social Services Board based in Derry at 31 years old.

He was appointed Northern Ireland Ombudsman, a post which he held for twenty years. He was elected vice president of the World Board of the International Ombudsman Institute. He was vice chair of the Northern Ireland Policing Board.

Frawley died on 24 June 2026, at the age of 77.

== Recognition ==
In 2003, Frawley was awarded an honorary doctorate (D.Univ) and then a Visiting Professorship by Ulster University. In 2008, he was appointed a CBE for his contribution to public service in Northern Ireland. In 2014, he was made an honorary fellow of the Royal College of Nursing.
