= St Mary's Christian Brothers' Grammar School, Belfast =

St. Mary's Christian Brothers' Grammar School
- Scoil Mhuire na mBráithre Críostaí

Location
- 147a Glen Road; Belfast, BT11 8NR; Northern Ireland
- 54.582527°N 6.000836°W

Information
- Type: Grammar School
- Religious affiliation: Roman Catholic
- Established: 1866/1929
- Local authority: Education Authority (Belfast)
- Chair: Sean Mahon
- Principal: Mr. Brendan McComb
- Staff: 157
- Gender: All-Male
- Age: 11 to 19
- Enrolment: 1170
- Colour
- Website: stmaryscbgs.com

St Mary's Christian Brothers' Grammar School (St Mary's CBGS) is a Roman Catholic boys' grammar school in Belfast, Northern Ireland.

== History ==
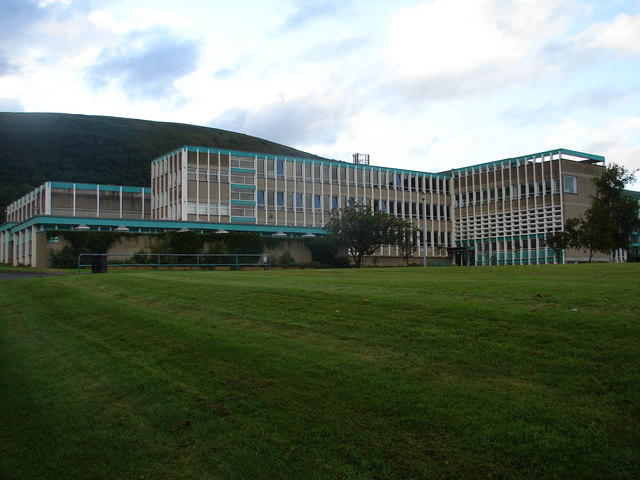
St Mary's Christian Brothers' Grammar School, Glen Road

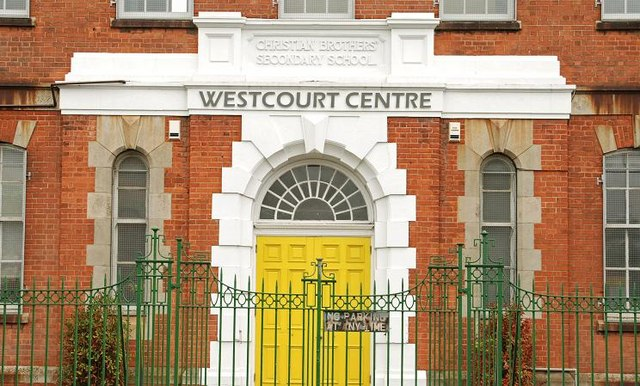
Former Barrack Street school entrance

The origins of the school can be traced to St Mary's School which was established in Divis Street by the Irish Christian Brothers in 1866. The Brothers had been invited by Patrick Dorrian, Bishop of Down and Connor, to educate the working class children of the area. In 1929, a new secondary school was built in the nearby Barrack Street. The students were largely drawn from the surrounding district but the school later began to attract students from across Belfast and wider afield. Due to the growing student population, it was decided in the 1960s to build a new school. This opened in a site off the Glen Road in 1968.

The Barrack Street campus remained in use until 1998 when all students were accommodated in the greatly extended school on the Glen Road. The original building on Barrack Street is now known as the Westcourt Centre and provides a range of educational and community services. Edmund Ignatius Rice who founded the Irish Christian Brothers was born in Westcourt, Callan, County Kilkenny. In 2012, the Barrack Street building was listed as a 'building of special architectural or historic interest' by the Department of the Environment.

The school was originally entirely run by the Irish Christian Brothers but in the late twentieth century their numbers declined and the school is now entirely staffed by lay teachers. It is now under the trusteeship of the Edmund Rice Schools Trust (NI).

== List of Principals ==
- Br. T.L. McGee: (c.1960-1965)
- Br J.M. Murphy: 1965-1970
- Br. O’Neill (Stoneface): c.1973-1976
- Br. D.M. McCrohan: 1976-1979
- Br. Larry Ennis: 1979-1982
- Br. Leo Kelly: 1982-1988
- Br. Denis Gleeson: 1988-1996
- Mr. Michael Crilly: 1996-97 (Acting)
- Mr. Kevin Burke (An tUas. Caoimhín de Búrca): 1997-2008
- Mr. Jim Sheerin: 2008-2014
- Mr. John Martin: 2014-2018
- Mrs. Siobhán Kelly: 2019–2024
- Mr. Brendan McComb: 2024–Present

== Facilities ==
The school is located on a large site on the lower slopes of the Black Mountain. In addition to classrooms, it houses computer suites, a technology suite, art studios, a music suite, science laboratories, a large lecture theatre, an assembly hall, and a canteen. The school's outdoor sports facilities include fifteen acres of playing field, a 3G pitch, and an athletics track. Indoors, there is a gymnasium and a swimming pool.

== Academics ==
The school provides instruction in a broad range of academic subjects. At the advanced level students are prepared for exams in Applied Business, Business Communication Systems, Biology, Chemistry, Mathematics, Further Mathematics, Physics, ICT, Computing, Art & Design, Geography, History, Religious Studies, Politics, English Literature, Drama, Irish, Music, Sports Studies, Media Studies, Home Economics, French, Spanish Travel and Leisure. St Mary's also offer a double award science option and a further maths option which pupils are chosen for.

In 2022, the school decided to abandon academic selection for entry.

In 2024, 83% of students achieving at least 7 GCSEs at Grades A* to C. 94% of students achieved at least 5 GCSEs at Grades A* to C. A 100% pass rate at grades A* to C was achieved by students in Gaeilge; French; Spanish; Irish; OCN Skills for Business; Media Studies; OCN Religion and Sports Studies. Over 90% pass rate at grades A* to C was achieved by students in Art and Design; English Language; English Literature; Mathematics, LLW, Double Award Science, Single Award Science and Technology and Design.

In 2024, 67.5% of its students who sat the A-level exams were awarded three A*-C grades. In addition, there was a 100% per cent pass rate at grades A* to C or equivalent for students who entered BTEC Extended Certificate in IT (Double Award); BTEC IT (Single Award); Art and Design; BTEC Sports (Single Award); BTEC Sports (Double Award); BTEC Sports (Triple Award); Biology; Applied Business; Irish; Cambridge Technical ICT; Further Maths; Media Studies; Music; Religious Studies and Spanish.

In 2022, the school produced a video that described its academic and other activities, with original music.

== Sport ==
=== Gaelic Games ===
The school hurling team has the Mageean Cup a total of 28 times - the most in the competition. It won the title five times in succession in the 1990s and again three times since 2010. St. Marys also completed an Ulster Colleges double in 2008 winning both the Mageean Cup and the MacLarnon Cup for the first time in the school's history after beating St Columbs (Derry) 1–7 to 0–8 in the final at Healy Park in Omagh on St Patrick's Day.

The school has also had sustained success in handball and Gaelic football.

=== Soccer ===
Since the lifting of the ban on school representation in soccer competitions in 2002 the school has become the most successful in Belfast. On St Patrick's Day 2006 at Lisburn Distillery's grounds the Year 12s won its first ever soccer cup, the Belfast Cup, defeating Boys Model School. They followed up the next year with its first NI Cup in 2007 (Year 12) as well as the 2007 Belfast Cup (Year 11).

This success was followed up in 2008 as they won the year 9 Belfast Cup as well as an historic double in lifting both the Carnegie Schools Northern Ireland Cup (Year 13/14) and became the first school in 20 years to retain the Malcolm Brodie Northern Ireland Trophy (year 12) with a victory over St Columbs, Derry. The winning tradition continues into the last year of the decade with wins in the NI Cup and Belfast Cup for the U14s and the U15s winning the Belfast cup.

=== Golf ===
St. Mary’s came 2nd in the Ulster Schools Golf championship on Tuesday at Spa Golf Club Ballynahinch.

=== Water polo ===
It is the only school in Ireland to have a clean sweep of All-Ireland titles at all age groups in consecutive years. A ninth Canada Cup in a row was won in April 2009 with several of the team continuing to represent Ireland at international tournaments.

=== Other sports ===
The school also competes in inter-schools competition in trampoline, athletics, golf, and basketball.

== Clubs and Societies ==
=== Debating ===
The school runs debating societies in English, Irish and Spanish, and has sent delegates representing Ireland to both the European Youth Parliament and European Youth Commission.

The school has excelled in the European and Irish News inter-school quizzes, currently holding both trophies. The school debating team won the Northern Ireland Schools Debating Championship in 2008, defeating the team from Antrim Grammar School in the final at Stormont. This is the only time St Mary's has won the competition.

=== Arts ===
The school maintains an orchestra and a recording studio, stages theatrical and musical performances, as well as entering students in art competitions.

=== Other clubs ===
- Social Justice Advocacy Group
- Eco Club
- French Club
- Coding Club
- Chess Club
- Drama Club
- Creative Writing Club
- Science Club

== Community activities ==
The school also encourages students to participate in a range of community-oriented activities through the Eco Club, the Social Justice Advocacy Group and the St. Vincent de Paul Society. The school also initiated Project Zambia (Irish: Tionscadal na Saimbia) which is designed to involve students in providing support for marginalised communities in Zambia.

== Awards ==
- In 2023, Raymond Herron, a teacher at the school, won the Pastoral Development of the Year award at the finals of the National Awards for Pastoral Care in Education which was held in Worcester, England. The award was for his leadership of the school’s work in promoting restorative practices for conflict and dispute resolution.

== Notable alumni ==
See also: Past Pupils, St. Mary's CBGS, Edmund Rice Schools Trust

Name	Born	Died	Description
Joseph Devlin	1871	1934	Politician; elected Member of Parliament (MP) of the UK Parliament for the Belfast West constituency; attended St Mary's Christian Brothers' School
George Martin	1877	1934	Gaelic footballer and administrator; one of the founders of the Ulster Gaelic Athletic Association; attended St Mary's Christian Brothers' School
Albert Sharpe	1885	1970	Actor on stage and screen; famous for role in Darby O'Gill and the Little People; attended St Mary's Christian Brothers' School
Seán MacEntee	1889	1984	Politician, TD, Tánaiste, member of the first Dáil Éireann; attended St Mary's Christian Brothers' School
Michael MacConaill	1902	1987	Chair of Anatomy at University College Cork; active in the Irish War of Independence; attended St Mary's Christian Brothers' School
Frank Murray	1912	1993	Belfast doctor; interned in Japanese prisoner-of-war camp in Singapore and Japan during Second World War
William Conway	1913	1977	Cardinal Archbishop of Armagh, Primate of All Ireland (1963-1977)
Francis Hanna	1914	1987	Lawyer and politician; active in Labour politics
Alf Murray	1914	1991	Teacher, Gaelic footballer and President of Gaelic Athletic Association (1964-1967)
Hugh Kelly	1919	1977	Gaelic footballer and soccer player for Glenavon
Joe Cahill	1920	2004	Chief of staff of the Provisional Irish Republican Army (1972-1973)
Thomas Bartley	1926	2007	Vicar general of the Diocese of Down and Connor|
Noel Conway			President, St Malachy's College, Belfast (1983-1995)
Patrick Walsh	1931	2023	Bishop of Down & Connor (1991-2008)
Gerry Burns	1934	2020	Senior civil servant, Northern Ireland Ombudsman; chaired a review of secondary education in Northern Ireland, the report of which was termed the Burns Report. It recommended the scrapping of the 11+ transfer examination.
James Dunwoody	1935	2012	University professor of mathematics at the University of Toronto and then at Queen's University Belfast
Muredach Dynan	1938	2021	University Professor and Pro Vice-Chancellor, Australian Catholic University
Jim McDonald	1938	2019	Chief Officer of the Labour Relations Agency (Northern Ireland)
Paddy Agnew	1942	2019	All-Ireland judo champion; rugby union player - capped twice for Ireland
Bernard Davey	1943		Television weather forecaster; weather presenter for BBC
Paddy Morgan	1943		Professional snooker player
James Dougall	1945	2010	Journalist, writer and broadcaster for RTÉ, UTV and the BBC
Séamus Mac Mathúna	1945		Irish language and Irish literature scholar, University Professor, Ulster University, Member of the Royal Irish Academy
Sir Richard McLaughlin	1947		High court judge, Courts of Northern Ireland
Chris Ryder	1947	2020	Journalist and author; contributed to Belfast Telegraph, the Sunday Times and the Daily Telegraph.
Ciarán Carson	1948	2019	Poet, novelist and university professor; Founding Director of Seamus Heaney Centre for Poetry; Elected member of Aosdána
Gerry Adams	1948		Irish Republican politician; president of Sinn Féin (1983 - 2018); elected Member of Parliament (MP) of the UK Parliament for the Belfast West constituency (1983-1992 and 1997-2011), but followed the policy of abstentionism; elected Teachta Dála (TD) for Louth (2011–2020)
John Cushnahan	1948		Politician in both Northern Ireland and Ireland; leader of the Alliance Party of Northern Ireland and then as a Member of the European Parliament for Fine Gael
Thomas Bartlett	1949		Historian, University Professor University College Dublin and University of Aberdeen
Seamus Finnegan	1949		Dramatist and author
Pat Finucane	1949	1989	Human rights lawyer; killed by loyalist paramilitaries from the Ulster Defence Association (UDA), acting in collusion with British security services. In 2011, the British Prime Minister, David Cameron, met with Pat Finucane's family and apologised for the collusion.
Thomas Frawley	1949		Northern Ireland Ombudsman and Commissioner for Complaints; Chief Executive Western Health and Social Services Board
Vincent McBrierty	1949		Physicist, University Professor, Trinity College Dublin; Member Royal Irish Academy
Daniel McCaughan			Electronic engineer and executive; Professorial Fellow Queen's University Belfast
Martin Lynch	1950		Playwright; Elected member of Aosdána
Martin McAleese	1951		Dentist, politician; Chancellor of Dublin City University (2011-2021); Senator of the Oireachtas (the Irish legislature) (2011-2013); husband of the 8th President of Ireland, Mary McAleese.
Micky Donnelly	1952	2019	Artist; Elected member of Aosdána
Paul Clark	1953		Television presenter - UTV
John G. Hughes	1953		Physicist and university vice-chancellor National University of Ireland, Maynooth; vice-chancellor, Bangor University, Wales
Éamon Phoenix	1953	2022	Political historian, author and broadcaster; Principal Lecturer Stranmillis University College
Gabriel Scally	1954		Public health physician; Regional Director of Public Health for South West England
Ciarán Mackel	1955		Architect and urban designer; president of the Royal Society of Ulster Architects (RIBA Northern Ireland) (2002-2004)
Ronan Bennett	1956		Novelist and screenwriter; political activist
Gearóid Ó Cairealláin	1957	2024	Irish language activist
Donal O'Donnell	1957		Judge, Supreme Court of Ireland (Dublin), Chief Justice of Ireland
John Ailbe O'Hara	1958		High Court judge, Courts of Northern Ireland
John Hannaway	1958		Senior accountant
Máirtín Ó Muilleoir	1959		Publisher, 58th Lord Mayor of Belfast (2013–14), MLA (Sinn Féin)
Liam Creagh	1959		Journalist and businessman - BBC, RTÉ, Sky News
Paul Kennedy	1959	2016	Clinical psychologist; Professor, University of Oxford; Head of Clinical Psychology at the National Spinal Injuries Centre, Stoke Mandeville Hospital
Pól Ó Dochartaigh	1961		Scholar of German literature; University professor, University of Galway; Member Royal Irish Academy
Jim Magilton	1962		Professional footballer; manager Cliftonville F.C.
John F. Larkin	1963		Attorney General for Northern Ireland
Declan McCavana	1963		French scholar and professor; MBE for services to the promotion of the English language in France
Pól Ó Muiri	1965		Journalist and poet, The Irish Times
Barry Kelly	1966		Radiologist; visiting professor of radiology at Ulster University
Seán Connor	1967		Professional footballer, manager of Sligo Rovers F.C.
Jim Magilton	1969		Professional footballer for Southampton F.C. and manager for Dundalk F.C., Cliftonville F.C. and other clubs
Jonjo O'Neill	1978		Actor: Royal Shakespeare Company, Royal National Theatre
Marty Rea			Actor
Gerard McCarthy	1981		Actor: BBC, Channel 4, Netflix, History Channel
Gerry Carroll	1987		Politician (People Before Profit Alliance); served as a Belfast City Councillor for the Black Mountain DEA from 2014 until 2016; MLA for Belfast West since 2016
Conor McLaughlin	1991		Professional footballer for Preston North End and Northern Ireland
Jackson McGreevy	1994		Hurler Antrim GAA

== See also ==
- List of secondary schools in Belfast
