= Jacob Bronowski =

Polish-born British mathematician and historian (1908–1974)

- Born: 18 January 1908; Łódź, Congress Poland, Russian Empire
- Died: 22 August 1974 (aged 66); East Hampton, New York, U.S.
- Resting place: Highgate Cemetery, London, England
- Education: Jesus College
- Known for: The Ascent of Man
- Spouse: Rita Coblentz (m. 1941)
- Children: 4, including Lisa Jardine
- Awards: Senior wrangler (Cambridge)
- Scientific career
- Fields: Mathematics, operations research, biology, history of science, geometry
- Workplaces: Salk Institute
- Doctoral advisor: Henry F. Baker

Jacob Bronowski (18 January 1908 – 22 August 1974) was a Polish-British mathematician and philosopher. He is best known for developing a humanistic approach to science, and as the presenter and writer of the thirteen-part 1973 BBC television documentary series, and accompanying book, The Ascent of Man. He was widely regarded as "one of the most revered intellectuals on the global stage."

Bronowski's family moved from Congress Poland to Germany and then to England in 1920, when he was 12 years old. He won a scholarship to study mathematics at the University of Cambridge. His interests have been described as ranging "widely, from biology to poetry and from chess to Humanism". He taught mathematics at University College Hull between 1934 and 1942. During World War II he led the field of operations research and worked to increase the effectiveness of Allied bombing.

After the war Bronowski headed the projects division of UNESCO. He wrote poetry and had a deep affinity for William Blake. From 1950 to 1963 he worked for the National Coal Board in the UK. From 1963 he was a resident fellow of the Salk Institute for Biological Studies in San Diego, until his death in 1974 in East Hampton, New York, just a year after the airing of his Ascent of Man.

== Early life and education ==
Bronowski was born to a Polish-Jewish family in Łódź, Congress Poland, in 1908. His family moved to Germany during the First World War, and to Britain in 1920, Bronowski's parents having been married in Britain in the London house of his maternal grandfather in 1907. Although, according to Bronowski, he knew only two English words on arriving in Britain, he gained admission to the Central Foundation Boys' School in London and went on to study mathematics at the University of Cambridge, graduating as Senior Wrangler (best student mathematician) in 1930.

As a mathematics student at Jesus College, Cambridge, Bronowski co-edited – with William Empson – the literary periodical Experiment, which first appeared in 1928. Bronowski would pursue this sort of dual activity, in both the mathematical and literary worlds, throughout his professional life. He was also a strong chess player, earning a half-blue while at Cambridge and composing numerous chess problems for the British Chess Magazine between 1926 and 1970. He received a PhD in mathematics at Cambridge in 1935, writing a dissertation in algebraic geometry. For a time in the 1930s he lived near Laura Riding and Robert Graves in Mallorca. From 1934 to 1942, he taught mathematics at the University College of Hull. Beginning in this period, the British secret service MI5 placed him under surveillance, believing he was a security risk, which may have restricted his access to senior posts in the UK.

== Wartime work in military analysis ==
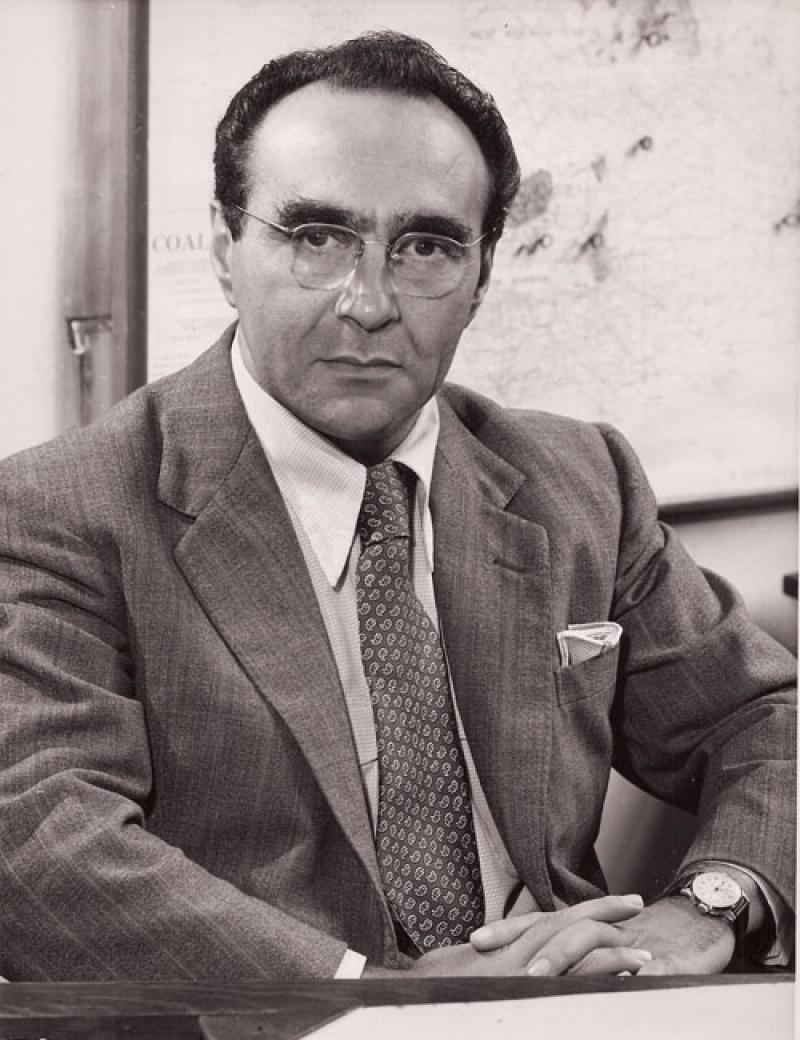
Jacob Bronowski

During the Second World War, Bronowski worked in operations research for the UK's Ministry of Home Security, where he developed mathematical approaches to bombing strategy for RAF Bomber Command. His research determined the exact mathematical ratios of high-explosive bombs to incendiary bombs to effect maximum industrial and urban destruction of targeted cities in Germany.

At the end of the war, Bronowski was part of a British team of scientists and civil engineers who visited Japan to document the effects of the atomic bombings of Hiroshima and Nagasaki for the purpose of studying the effects of the atomic bomb and its implications for future UK civil defence. Bronowski, in conjunction with Professor W. N. Thomas of Cardiff University, subsequently produced the secret Report of the British Mission to Japan: the Effects of the Atomic Bombs Dropped at Hiroshima and Nagasaki, which was passed to various government departments and consulted in the design of future UK public buildings. It was simultaneously published in the US.

== Postwar biological analysis ==
Following his experiences of the after-effects of the Nagasaki and Hiroshima bombings, he discontinued his work for British military research and turned to biology, as did his friend Leo Szilard, and many other physicists of that time, to better understand the nature of violence. Subsequently, Bronowski became Director of Research for the National Coal Board in the UK, and an associate director of the Salk Institute from 1964.

In 1950, Bronowski was given the Taung Child's fossilised skull and asked to try, using his statistical skills, to combine a measure of the size of the skull's teeth with their shape to discriminate them from the teeth of apes. Work on this turned his interests towards the biology of humanity's intellectual products.

== Public science education ==
In 1967 Bronowski delivered the six Silliman Memorial Lectures at Yale University and chose as his subject the role of imagination and symbolic language in the progress of scientific knowledge. Transcripts of the lectures were published posthumously in 1978 as The Origins of Knowledge and Imagination and remain in print. He first became familiar to the British public through appearances on the BBC Television version of The Brains Trust in the late 1950s.

=== The Ascent of Man (1973); BBC television documentary ===
Bronowski is best remembered for The Ascent of Man, a 13-part series about the history of human life and scientific endeavour. This project was commissioned by David Attenborough, then director of programmes for BBC Television, and was intended to complement two preceding series: art historian Kenneth Clark's "personal view" series Civilisation (1969), which had covered cultural history, and Alistair Cooke's series America: A Personal History of the United States (first broadcast in 1972).

The documentary was described as "a landmark in television" and "lavishly produced and visually stunning, it impressed viewers with its lucidity and with the power of the presenter’s personality".

==== Auschwitz scene ====
In a personal scene filmed at Auschwitz concentration camp, where many Jewish members of his family died during the Holocaust, Bronowski walks into the muddy waters where the ashes of his family were thrown, saying:

It is said that science will dehumanise people and turn them into numbers. That is false - tragically false. Look for yourself. This is the concentration camp and crematorium at Auschwitz. This is where people were turned into numbers. Into this pond were flushed the ashes of four million people. And that was not done by gas. It was done by arrogance. It was done by dogma. It was done by ignorance. When people believe that they have absolute knowledge, with no test in reality - this is how they behave. This is what men do when they aspire to the knowledge of gods.

In an interview by Michael Parkinson conducted soon after the programme was broadcast, Bronowski's recounted his visit to Auschwitz leading to Parkinson's describing the segment as one of the most memorable parts of any interview he had done. Decades later and at the end of his career, Parkinson said: "if I could save one interview from the thousands I have done, it would be the one-man show with Professor Jacob Bronowski."

== Personal life ==
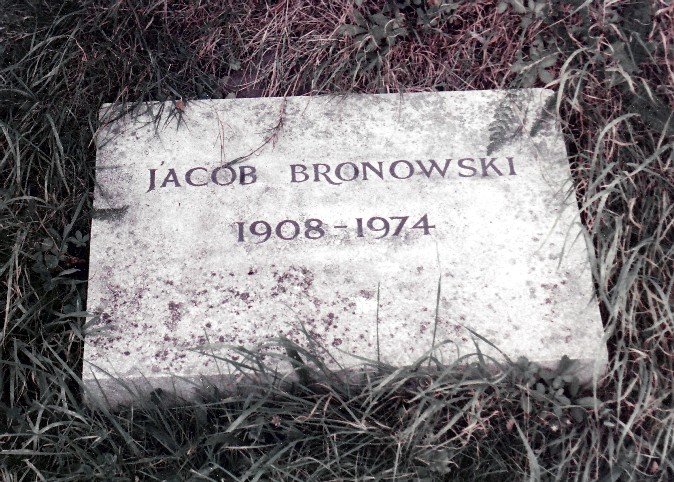
Jacob Bronowski's grave in Highgate Cemetery, London

Bronowski married Rita Coblentz in 1941. The couple had four daughters, the eldest was the academic Lisa Jardine and another is the filmmaker Judith Bronowski.

He died in 1974 of a heart attack in East Hampton, New York, a year after The Ascent of Man was first broadcast.

== Legacy ==
In 1970, John Cleese says "I'm not Doctor bloody Bronowski!" in the Monty Python sketch, "Exploding Penguin on the TV Set". In 2011, on the reissue of The Ascent of Man with a foreword by Richard Dawkins, Tim Radford in The Guardian described it "as compelling as ever".

In 2013, Cambridge University Press published a critique, Jacob Bronowski: a humanist intellectual for an atomic age, 1946–1956, by the science historian Ralph Desmarais, who wrote: "Witnessing Hiroshima helped transform him from pure mathematician–poet to scientific administrator ... to fame on the BBC airwaves ... from literary intellectual who promoted the superior truthfulness of poetry and poets to scientific humanist insisting that science and scientists were the standard-bearers of truth", but "discussing atomic energy ... Bronowski not only downplayed the bomb's significance but was deliberately vague regarding Britain's atomic weapon development programme."

In 2015, the British Science Association launched The Jacob Bronowski Award Lecture at the British Science Festival in September, launched in partnership with the Victoria and Albert Museum, to celebrate cutting-edge work at the interface between the arts and sciences. In 2019, Timothy Sandefur's biography The Ascent of Jacob Bronowski: The Life and Ideas of a Popular Science Icon, he describes Bronowski as more than a polymath, and that he "was involved with nearly every major intellectual undertaking of the twentieth century"; that he was a "serious philosopher" who made "probably the finest documentary film ever made".

== Books ==
- The Poet's Defence (1939)
- William Blake: A Man Without a Mask (1943)
- The Common Sense of Science (1951)
- The Face of Violence (1954)
- Science and Human Values. New York: Julian Messner, Inc. 1965 [1956].
- Atomic Fusion. London: Newman Neame Take Home Books Ltd. 1958. Illustrated by Bartley Powell.
- William Blake: The Penguin Poets Series (1958)
- The Western Intellectual Tradition, From Leonardo to Hegel (1960) – with Bruce Mazlish
- Biography of an Atom (1963) – with Millicent Selsam
- Insight (1964)
- The Identity of Man. Garden City: The Natural History Press. 1965.
- Nature and Knowledge: The Philosophy of Contemporary Science (1969)
- William Blake and the Age of Revolution (1972)
- The Ascent of Man (1974)
- A Sense of the Future (1977)
- Magic, Science & Civilisation (1978)
- The Origins of Knowledge and Imagination (1978)
- The Visionary Eye: Essays in the Arts, Literature and Science (1979) – edited by Piero Ariotti and Rita Bronowski.
