= Thomas Bartley =

Thomas or Tom Bartley may refer to:

- Thomas W. Bartley (1812–1885), Democratic politician from the U.S. state of Ohio
- Thomas Bartley (priest) (1926–2007), Roman Catholic priest and former Vicar General of the Diocese of Down and Connor
- Thomas Bartley (cricket umpire) (1908–1964), English test cricket umpire
- Thomas Bartley (footballer) (1874–1951), Glossop North End F.C. and Wales international footballer
- Thomas Bartley (politician) (1798–1878), New Zealand politician
