= Edmund Rice College =

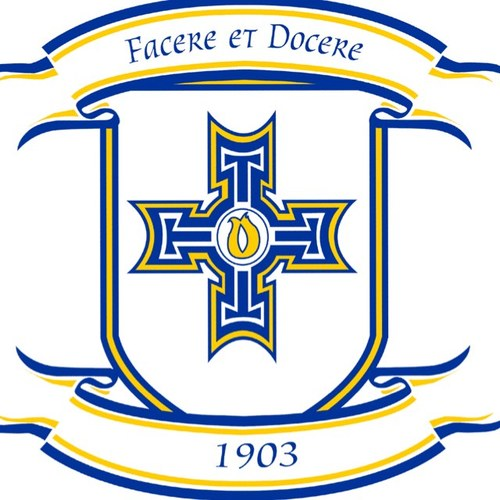
- Crest of Edmund Rice College

Location
- 96-100 Hightown Road; Glengormley, Antrim, BT36 7AU; Northern Ireland

Information
- Type: Secondary school
- Motto: “Excellence, Respect, Care”
- Religious affiliation: Roman Catholic
- Established: 1903; 123 years ago
- Principal: Paul Berne
- Gender: Mixed
- Enrollment: 940 (approx)
- Colour
- Website: http://edmundricecollege.co.uk/

Edmund Rice College is a Roman Catholic school located in Glengormley, County Antrim, Northern Ireland. It is named after Edmund Ignatius Rice, founder of the Congregation of Christian Brothers.

== History ==
The college traces its origin to 1903 when the Christian Brothers established St. Joseph's School in Hardinge Street, in the New Lodge area of the city. In the 1930s, the school changed its name to Hardinge Street Junior Technical School and following reforms brought about by the Education Act (Northern Ireland) 1947, was renamed Hardinge Street CBS. In Easter of 1972, the school moved to the old Park Lodge House at the foot of the Cavehill. The current school building opened in September 1977 and was initially called Hightown Road CBS (Gort Mhuire). In 1995, it was renamed Edmund Rice College. In 2017, Edmund Rice opened up as a mixed gender school, It is now under the trusteeship of the Edmund Rice Schools Trust (NI).

== Academics ==
The school offers a full curriculum, including a range of subjects at GCSE, GNVQ and A Level. In 2021, 87 per cent of students achieved three A-Levels at grades A* to C.
