= Ciarán Mackel =

Ciarán Mackel, BSc, Dip. Arch, Dip. Project Management, MSc Design, RIBA MRIAI, was born in 1955 is a Belfast-based architect and urban designer.

He is "practice principal" in ARD Ciaran Mackel Architects.

He is a member of the Architectural Association of Ireland and has been involved in architectural education at the Queen's University of Belfast.

== Education ==
He was educated at St Mary's Christian Brothers' Grammar School, Belfast and at Queen's University of Belfast (QUB).

== Professional activities ==
He was founding partner of Mackel and Doherty Architectural practice in 1994.

From 2002-2004 he served as president of the Royal Society of Ulster Architects (RIBA Northern Ireland) and in 2005 he served as Ulster representative to the Royal Institute of the Architects of Ireland (RIAI).

He wrote on architecture for the short-lived Irish Republican Daily Ireland newspaper, which formed part of the Andersonstown News Group of newspapers. In one column in 2006, he called on the Westminster government "to commission a design competition for the proposed centre for conflict transformation earmarked for the Long Kesh prison site."

In 2012 he was appointed as a member of the Maze/Long Kesh Development Corporation and re-appointed for a further term in 2017.

He contributed an essay to the Arts Council of Northern Ireland collection on arts and the Troubles, which focused mostly on Belfast "the largest urban area in Northern Ireland, as the principal ground of the conflict and as the historical arena for the expression of sectarian conflict even before partition of the island."

== Built works and accolades ==
Mackel's works include the Bunscoil an tSleibhe Dhuibh and the Kinnaird Street office building, both in Belfast.

In 2012 a house extension, designed by Mackel, at Osborne Park, Belfast, won an RIBA Award.

Preceded by Barrie Todd	RSUA President; 2002–2004	Succeeded by Mervyn Black
