= Pól Ó Dochartaigh =

Professor and university leader

- Born: 1961 (age 64–65); Belfast, Northern Ireland, UK

Academic background
- Education: Cardiff University; University of Nottingham; University of Wales

Academic work
- Discipline: German studies, European history
- Institutions: University of Galway

Pól Ó Dochartaigh (born 1961) is a professor of European History at the University of Galway.

== Early life and studies ==
Ó Dochartaigh was born in Belfast, Northern Ireland, where he attended St. Mary's Christian Brothers' Grammar School, Belfast.

He attended University College Cardiff, where he received a BA (Hons) in German in 1987, and continued with doctoral studies at the University of Nottingham, where he was awarded a PhD in German Literature in 1995.

== Career ==
Ó Dochartaigh returned to Ireland where he was appointed Professor of German, Dean of the Faculty of Arts, and Dean of the Confucius Institute for Northern Ireland, at the University of Ulster. He was awarded a BA (hons) in Irish Language and Literature from the University of Ulster in 2004.

He was appointed as Deputy President and Registrar of University of Galway in 2014 and retired from that post in April 2024.

== Publications ==
- The Portrayal of Jews in GDR Prose Fiction (Amsterdam 1997)
- Julius Pokorny, 1887-1970: Germans Celts and Nationalism (Dublin 2003)
- Germans and Jews since the Holocaust (Basingstoke 2015)

== Awards ==
- Member, Royal Irish Academy
- Fellow, Royal Historical Society
- Fellow, Royal Society of Arts

== Honours ==
- President, Association for German Studies in Great Britain and Ireland (2011–14)
- Chair, Royal Irish Academy Committee for Modern Languages (2004-9)
