= John Ailbe O'Hara =

Northern Irish judge

The Right Honourable Sir John Ailbe O'Hara KC
- Royal coat of arms of the United Kingdom
- Incumbent
- Assumed office 8 April 2013
- Appointed by: Elizabeth II; Charles III

Personal details
- Born: August 1958 (age 67) Belfast, Northern Ireland
- Profession: Barrister

Sir John Ailbe O'Hara KC (b. 1958) is a Judge of the High Court of Justice in Northern Ireland.

A native of Belfast and a graduate of St Mary's Christian Brothers Grammar School, Mr Justice O'Hara was sworn into office before the Rt Hon Sir Declan Morgan, Lord Chief Justice of Northern Ireland, on 8 April 2013. He was called to the Bar of Northern Ireland in 1979 and was named Queen's Counsel in 1999.

== Cases ==
- THE BELFAST HEALTH AND SOCIAL CARE TRUST (12 October 2012)
- Acquittal of Ivor Bell (28 October 2019)
