= George Martin (Gaelic footballer) =

Antrim Gaelic footballer

George Martin (1877–1934) was a Gaelic footballer and a founder of the Ulster GAA, the northern branch of the Gaelic Athletic Association.

Martin was born in Belfast and attended St Mary's School in Divis Street. He qualified as a solicitor and practiced initially in Dublin before returning to Belfast where he established a reputation in bankruptcy cases.

While at school, he joined the Tír na nÓg GAA club and quickly became involved in organisational issues. In 1903, he was elected the first president of the Ulster GAA. In 1904 he was elected secretary. In the same year he was elected treasurer of Antrim GAA, in 1908 vice-chairman and in 1909 chairman. He also served on the Central Council of the GAA.

The Ulster GAA placed a commemorative plaque on his grave in Milltown Cemetery in 2009, during its 125-year celebrations.
