= Jill McIvor =

Northern Irish barrister (1930–2019)

Jill McIvor

Frances Jill McIvor CBE (née Anderson; born 10 August 1930 - 8 January 2019) was a Northern Irish barrister who was the first woman to serve as Northern Ireland Ombudsman and Commissioner for Complaints (1991–93).

In 1953 McIvor married the Ulster Unionist politician Basil McIvor; they had two sons and a daughter Jane. She was widowed in 2004.

A barrister by profession, she has served in a variety of bodies including: Independent Broadcasting Authority, Radio Authority, Fair Employment Commission, Board of Cooperation North, Board of Visitors of QUB (Member), and Ulster-New Zealand Trust (Chairperson).
