= Vincent McBrierty =

Vincent Joseph McBrierty (born 1941) is an Irish academic, author, educator, physicist, and researcher.

== Career ==
An alumnus of St. Mary's Christian Brothers' Grammar School, Belfast, he attended Queen's University Belfast where he read Physics and graduated as a BSc (Hons). He then undertook postgraduate research at Middlesex Hospital Medical School, London, obtaining a PhD in 1965 on the subject of nitrogen oxides.

After working at the University of Bristol, McBrierty joined Trinity College Dublin in 1967 where he remained throughout his academic career, rising to the position of Professor of Polymer Physics in 1979. He received an Hon ScD from TCD in 1979 and was awarded the title of Fellow Emeritus on his retirement. McBrierty was the first Catholic on the academic staff in the Department of Physics at TCD, where he served as a professor, Dean, and Bursar.

== Research and Recognition ==
McBrierty's research focused on the molecular dynamics of polymers and composites, utilising techniques such as nuclear magnetic resonance and electron spin resonance to develop a deep understanding of polymer-based materials.The author of several books, including a biography of E. T. S. Walton, he was elected to membership of the Royal Irish Academy in 1983 and was vice-president from 1988 to 1993.

== Publications ==
- McBrierty, V.J., & O'Hanlon, G. The World in Crisis: the Response of the Church, The Furrow, Vol. 63, No. 9 (September 2012), pp. 391–400.
- Quinn, FX, Kampff, E, Smyth, G, Mcbrierty, VJ, Water in Hydrogels .1. A Study Of Water in Poly(N-Vinyl-2-Pyrrolidone Methyl-Methacrylate) Copolymer, Macromolecules, vol 21, no 11 (November 1988), pp 3191–3198.

== Honours and awards ==
- Knight of the Sacred Military Constantinian Order of Saint George
- Member, Royal Irish Academy (1983)
