= Seamus Finnegan =

Northern Irish playwright

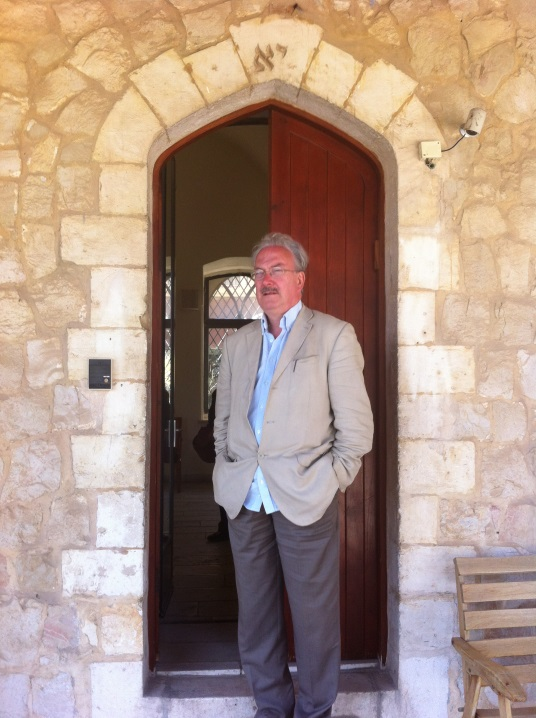
- Seamus Finnegan in Mishkenot Sha'ananim, Jerusalem 2012
- Born: Seamus Finnegan; 1 March 1949 (age 77); Belfast, Northern Ireland
- Occupations: Playwright, dramatist & lecturer
- Years active: 1978–present

Seamus Finnegan (born 1949) is a Northern Irish playwright. He lives in London, and was born in Belfast Northern Ireland on 1 March 1949. In 2010, Finnegan and American academic Carolyn Cummings-Osmond were married in London.

== Early life ==
Born in Belfast Northern Ireland, he is the son of Mary (née Magee) and Billy Finnegan, a bricklayer. He went to St Mary's Grammar School where he was taught by the Irish Christian Brothers. At the outbreak of 'the Troubles' in Northern Ireland, he became a member of the Northern Ireland Civil Rights Movement and the People's Democracy (a left wing student group led by amongst others, Bernadette McAliskey née Devlin). In 1971 he went to Manchester to read English, Drama and Education where he graduated and qualified as a teacher. He later moved to London where he taught at the Jews' Free School from 1974 to 1978.

== Career ==
Finnegan's first major play Act of Union was produced in 1980 at the Soho Poly Theatre with the support of Bill Ash and of which Irving Wardle wrote in The Times: "It may seem a negative compliment to this extremely informative and well-written piece, but its main achievements are to have developed a highly theatrical pattern from dislocated fragments, and to have exposed some of the tangled loyalties and hatreds of the divided country without the smallest trace of sectarian bias". Soldiers, North and Mary's Men soon followed in the quartet of 'Troubles' plays.

In 1982, at the invitation of Kariel Gardosh, the Israeli Cultural Attaché in London, Finnegan's play James Joyce And The Israelites was performed at the First International Conference and Festival of Jewish Theater in Tel Aviv. "An evening of undivided enjoyment... a non-Jewish play on a Jewish subject done with much understanding and sympathy" (Jerusalem Post).

In 1984, Tout, a play about informers in Northern Ireland was commissioned by the Royal Shakespeare Company and performed at the Barbican as part of the Thought Crimes At The Barbican season in memory of George Orwell and his 1984.

1986 saw the production of The War Trilogy which included The Spanish Play, The German Connection and subsequently for BBC Radio 3 The Cemetery of Europe. Of The German Connection, which opened at the Young Vic, Andrew Rissik wrote in The Independent: 'Seamus Finnegan's The German Connection is an outstanding new play whose theme is tellingly summarised in the line, "Betrayal can make monsters of people... Finnegan's writing cuts through the potential melodrama with heart-breaking perception and skill... his dialogue has an urgent workaday vigour..."

In the mid-nineties, Finnegan was writer in residence at Mishkenot Sha’ananim in Jerusalem, where he collaborated with Israeli dramatist Miriam Kainy on Hypatia and began work on his book about Israeli playwrights, Dialogues In Exile, with the help and support of Dani Horovitz, another Israeli dramatist.

Since 1998, Finnegan has worked closely with Scottish theatre director and artist, Ken McClymont on more than seven productions, most notably, Dead Faces Laugh, Disapora Jigs, Murder In Bridgport and Spinoza and with Madani Younis at the Bush Theatre in 2012 on The Star In The Cross, a play set in the Budapest ghetto and Jerusalem in 1944.

Finnegan's latest work with director Ken McClymont: After Paris at Rosemary Branch Theatre in 2016 and I Am Of Ireland at Old Red Lion Theatre in June 2018, of which Julia Pascal wrote in londongrip, 'an epic piece of theatre rooted in Irish identity, politics and history';'a vivid production in sympathy with poetry of writing'.

== List of Plays ==
- Laws of God, Half Moon Theatre, 1978
- Act of Union, Soho Poly, 1980
- Herself Alone, Old Red Lion, 1981
- Soldiers, Old Red Lion, 1981
- James Joyce and the Israelites, Lyric Studio and First International Festival of Jewish Theatre, 1982
- Tout, Royal Shakespeare Company, Barbican, 1984
- North, Cockpit Theatre, 1984
- Beyond a Joke, Cockpit Theatre and Queen Elizabeth Hall, 1984
- Marys Men, Drill Hall Theatre, 1984
- Gombeen, Air Gallery, 1985
- The Spanish Play, Place Theatre, 1986
- The German Connection, Young Vic, 1986
- The Murphy Girls, Drill Hall Theatre, 1988
- 1916, Institute of Contemporary Art, 1989
- Mary Maginn, Drill Hall Theatre, 1990
- Comrade Brennan, 7/84 Scotland, 1991
- It's All Blarney, 1992
- Hypatia, National Theatre Studio, 1994
- Dead Faces Laugh, Old Red Lion, 1998
- Life after Life, Old Red Lion, 2000
- Diaspora Jigs, Old Red Lion, 2001
- Murder in Bridgport, Old Red Lion, 2002
- Waiting for the Angels, Old Red Lion, 2002
- Landscapes after Exile, Lyric Studio, 2006
- The Beautiful Nun, RADA, 2008
- Fear, Misery and Laughter, Old Red Lion, 2010
- Spinoza, Old Red Lion, 2010
- The Star in the Cross, Bush Theatre, 2012
- After Paris, Rosemary Branch Theatre, 2016
- I Am Of Ireland, Old Red Lion, 2018

Mrs Burns's Black Range, Freshfest at Old Red Lion 2026 Shalom Belfast...Upstairs at the Gatehouse Theatre, 2026

== Radio, TV and Film ==
- Doctors' Dilemmas, BBC2, 1983
- The Cemetery of Europe, BBC Radio 3, 1988
- Wild Grass, BBC Radio 4, 1990
- Shadows of Time, screenplay version of The German Connection, 1990
- Run like the Wind, film script commission, 1994

== Books ==
- North, Marion Boyars, 1987
- The Cemetery of Europe, Marion Boyars, 1991
- James Joyce and the Israelites/Dialogues in Exile, Harwood Academic, 1995
- It's All Blarney, Harwood Academic, 1995
- Dead Faces Laugh, Harwood Academic, 1999
- After Paris, Wild Goat Press, 2017
- Two Jewish Plays, Wild Goat Press, 2017
- I Am Of Ireland, Wild Goat Press, 2018
- Diaspora Jigs, Wild Goat Press, 2019
- Bucksey and Yap, Wild Goat Press, 2019
- The Beautiful Nun, Wild Goat Press, 2020.
- MURDER IN BRIDGPORT, Wild Goat Press, 2021
- MRS BURNS'S BLACK RANGE & MCGLINCHEY & FLANNAGAN, Amazon, 2023

SHALOM BELFAST/Amazon 2025
