= Gerry Burns =

Northern Ireland civil servant (1934–2020)

Gerry Burns (1934–2020) was a senior civil servant in Northern Ireland renowned for his report on education termed the Burns Report.

Gerry Burns was born in the Falls Road, Belfast district on November 15, 1934. He attended St. Mary's Christian Brothers' Grammar School, Belfast followed by Queen's University Belfast, from which he graduated with a BSc in economics. He then began a career in the Northern Ireland civil service and became chief executive of Fermanagh District Council.

He retired from the council in 1996 and became Northern Ireland Ombudsman. He chaired a review of secondary education in Northern Ireland, the report of which was termed the Burns Report. It recommended the scrapping of the 11+ transfer examination.

He was a survivor of the Enniskillen bombing in 1987. Afterwards he was involved in various peace-building projects. With Gordon Wilson, he established the Spirit of Enniskillen Trust which was designed to encourage young people to work through local and international programmes to help understand and respect each other's traditions.

He was also a director of the Irish Times and a trustee of the Irish Times Trust.

He died February 18, 2020.
