= Pól Ó Muiri =

Irish writer (born 1965)

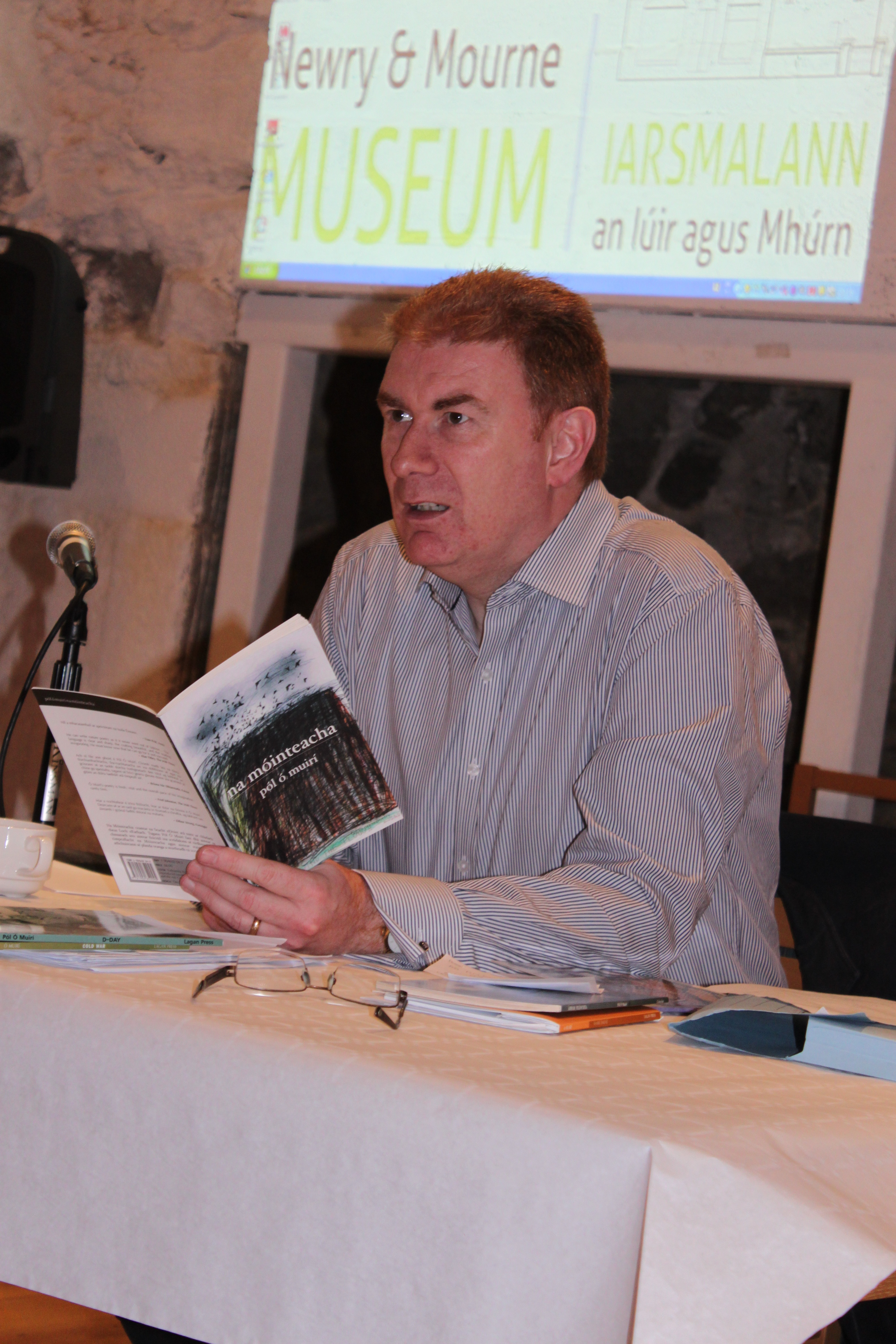
Pól Ó Muirí in Newry, County Down, Northern Ireland

Pól Ó Muiri (b 1965) is an Irish journalist, poet, and Irish-language editor of The Irish Times.

== Biography ==
Ó Muiri was born in Belfast in 1965. He attended St Mary's Christian Brothers' Grammar School, Belfast and then Queen's University Belfast from which he was awarded a BA (Hons) in Celtic Studies and Scholastic Philosophy followed by a PhD in Celtic Studies.

In 1991, he was given the Sam Hanna Bell Fellowship in Literature from the Cultural Traditions Group.

== Career ==
Ó Muiri is a journalist and currently Irish language editor of The Irish Times.

He writes principally in Irish, his works covering poetry and short fiction in both languages, as well as a biography of Seosamh Mac Grianna.

== Bibliography ==
- Faoi Scáil na Ríona, 1991
- Dinnseanchas, 1992
- Ginealach Ultach, 1993
- Siosafas: Gearrscéalta, 1995
- Abhar Filíochta, 1995
- D-Day, 1995
- A Flight from Shadow: The Life & Works of Seosamh Mac Grianna, 1999
- Is Mise Ísmeáél, 2000
- Na Móinteacha, 2004
- Seosamh Mac Grianna: Míreanna Saoil, 2007
- Cold War, 2009
