= Paul Kennedy (psychologist) =

Northern Irish clinical psychologist (1959-2016)

- Born: 1959; Belfast
- Died: 2016 (aged 56–57)
- Education: Queens University, Belfast; Ulster Polytechnic
- Scientific career
- Fields: Clinical psychology; Spina bifida
- Workplaces: National Spinal Injuries Centre
- Thesis: Psychological aspects of spinal cord injury : behavioural approaches, emotional impact and coping strategies. (1959)

Paul Kennedy (1959–2016) was a clinical psychologist with expertise in spinal cord damage rehabilitation.

== Biography ==
Kennedy was born in Belfast where he attended St. Mary's Christian Brothers' Grammar School, Belfast. He proceeded to Ulster University where he obtained a BSc in Psychology. He then undertook training in clinical psychology at Queens University, Belfast. In 1995, he was awarded a DPhil by Ulster University for a thesis on psychological aspects of spinal injury.

He developed psychological services for the National Spinal Injuries Centre at Stoke Mandeville Hospital. He also worked to develop the clinical psychology training programme at the University of Oxford where he was appointed Professor of Clinical Psychology.

== Publications ==
- Llewellyn, C., & Kennedy, P. (eds.) (2003). Handbook of Clinical Health Psychology. Chichester: Wiley.
- Kennedy, P. (ed.) (2007). Psychological management of physical disabilities: a practitioner's guide. London: Routledge.
- Beinert, H., Kennedy, P., & Llewellyn, S. (eds.) (2009). Clinical psychology in practice. Chichester: BPS/Blackwell.
- Kennedy, P. (ed.) (2012). The Oxford handbook of rehabilitation psychology. Oxford: Oxford University Press.

== Awards ==
- 2014: Outstanding Psychologist, Spinal Injuries Association
- 2013: Lifetime Achievement Award, Buckinghamshire Healthcare NHS Trust
- 2011: Ludwig-Guttmann Prize, Deutschprachige Medizinsche Gelleschaft Paraplegiologie, Germany
- 2002: Distinguished Service Award, American Association of Psychologists and Social Workers in Spinal Cord injury
- 1999: Lars Sullivan Award
- 1995: Golden Helix Award, Hewlett Packard European Healthcare
