= Éamon Phoenix =

Irish historian (1953–2022)

- Born: 17 May 1953; Belfast, Northern Ireland
- Died: November 13, 2022 (aged 69); Belfast, Northern Ireland
- Occupations: Writer, Lecturer
- Title: Dr.
- Board member of: Edmund Rice Schools Trust Northern Ireland
- Spouse: Alice Phoenix
- Children: Mary-Alice
- Parent(s): James and Margaret Phoenix (nee Napier)

Academic background
- Education: St Mary's Christian Brothers' Grammar School, Belfast
- Alma mater: Queen's University Belfast
- Thesis: The Nationalist movement in Northern Ireland 1914-28 (1983)

Academic work
- Discipline: Irish history; Adult education
- Institutions: Stranmillis University College

Éamon Gerard Phoenix (17 May 1953 – 13 November 2022) was one of Northern Ireland’s leading social and political historians specialising in the history of the North-East part of the island. He was a regular broadcaster with BBC Northern Ireland and a prolific contributor to Irish News.

== Biography ==
Éamon Phoenix attended St Mary's Christian Brothers' Grammar School, Belfast and subsequently Queen’s University Belfast. He was awarded a B.A. (Hons) in History followed by a Ph.D. in 1983. The topic of his PhD thesis was Irish nationalism.

He taught history at St Michael's College, Enniskillen and then at St Malachy's College, Belfast. He also worked as a Fellow at the Institute of Irish Studies at Queen's University Belfast before taking up a permanent appointment at Stranmillis University College.

He published extensively on aspects of Irish history and regularly gave public lectures on the subject. He wrote articles on aspects of Irish history for newspapers and for online publications including the BBC and also contributed to programmes on BBC Radio Ulster.

== Public life ==
Phoenix held a variety of positions. He was Chairperson of the Edmund Rice Schools Trust Northern Ireland. He was a member of the Expert Advisory Group established by the Irish government to advise it on matters related to the Decade of Centenaries.

He also organised a lecture series for the Northern Ireland Community Relations Council. He was a member of the National Famine Committee and the Nomadic Project Board. He was a Trustee of the Ulster Historical Foundation.

== Awards ==
- 2022 - Good Relations Award from the Community Relations Council

== Legacy ==
In 2023 Stranmillis University College established the Dr Éamon Phoenix Memorial Lecture dedicated to honouring his legacy. The lecture is designed to attract educators, researchers, students and professionals to engage in discussions on contemporary educational themes.

== Bibliography ==
=== Books ===
- Phoenix, E.G., McAuley, E., & McSparran, N. (2021). Feis na nGleann: A Century of Gaelic Culture in the Antrim Glens. Belfast: Ulster Historical Foundation.
- Phoenix, E.G. (2000). Two Acres of Irish History: Study Through Time of Friar's Bush and Belfast, 1570–1918. Belfast: Ulster Historical Foundation.
- Phoenix, E.G. (1995). A Century of Northern Life: Irish News and 100 Years of Ulster History, 1890s-1990s. Belfast: Ulster Historical Foundation.
- Phoenix, E.G. (1994). Northern Nationalism: Nationalist Politics, Partition and the Catholic Minority in Northern Ireland, 1890–1940. Belfast: Ulster Historical Foundation.

=== Articles ===
- McMinn, R., & Phoenix, E. (2005). The Chilver Report: unity and diversity. Irish Educational Studies, 24 (1), 5-19.
- McMinn, R., Phoenix, E., & Beggs, J. (2016). Jeremiah Jordan M.P. (1830–1911): Protestant home ruler or ‘Protestant renegade’?, Irish Historical Studies, 36, 143, 349-367.
