= Chibolya =

Suburb of Lusaka, Zambia

Chibolya is a komboni-township in Lusaka, Zambia. It was founded in 1973 and is the largest township in Lusaka Province.

It is notorious for gang violence in the city. Open air drug dealing is a common problem in this area, and residents welcomed a clean up exercise by police. However, as of late 2017, the problem continued to persist after the operation, as the dealers moved back into their territories. President Edgar Lungu announced plans to redevelop Chibolya in 2019.
