= Project Zambia =

- Founded: 2002
- Type: Non-profit • Education
- Location: Belfast, Northern Ireland
- Fields: Development
- Key people: Kevin Burke, Dr Aidan Donaldson, Mr Peter Tembo

Project Zambia (Irish: Tionscadal na Saimbia) was initiated by St Marys CBGS Belfast, Northern Ireland, in 2002.

It was a response by the school in Belfast to the issue of poverty in the compounds of Lusaka, Zambia. Since then the project has grown beyond the school. Project Zambia is today undertaken in association with the Congregation of Christian Brothers, and an NGO, Edmund Rice International.

== Goals ==
Working in partnership with the people in Zambia, the project seeks to help, support and empower the host communities to develop solutions to their problems and difficulties.

The project also reputedly seeks to raise awareness of the conditions and causes that offend the human dignity of so many people throughout the world and to forge close bonds of solidarity between communities in Ireland and communities in Zambia.

== Misisi compound ==
Misisi compound, the primary location for Project Zambia's efforts, is a shanty town home to around 80,000 people, and is one of the most deprived areas in sub-Saharan Africa. HIV is common among adults and children, many of whom have lost their parents to the disease. Average life expectancy is just 32. The lack of clean water has led to regular cholera outbreaks.

As in other Zambian urban compounds, food is scarce. Project Zambia is making headway in creating solutions to this problem. As well as extending the agricultural project, and providing chicken runs, it is also creating social economy projects, the profits of which feed back into the various projects. An example of this is the bakery project.

== Mapepe village ==
Mapepe, a village on the outskirts of Lusaka, Zambia, was recognised as a potential area of development for Project Zambia. Since beginning the development in Mapepe, a school has been built with further development planned for future groups. A chicken run was also completed as of April 2009. Two bore holes have also been installed to supply the 2000 villagers with clean water.
