= H. Douglas Keith =

British Physicist

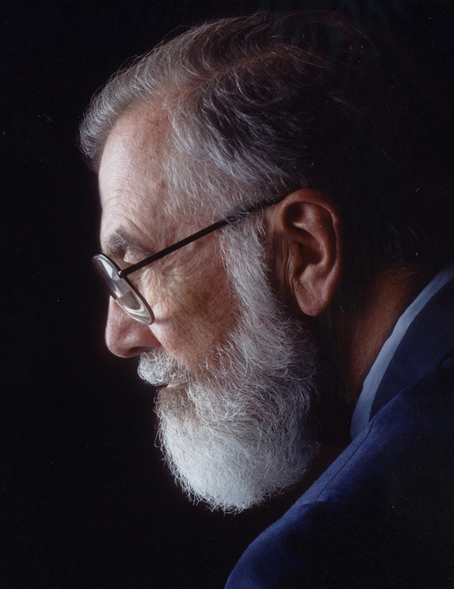
- Born: 10 March 1927; Belfast, Northern Ireland
- Died: 9 February 2003 (aged 75); South Windsor, Connecticut, U.S.
- Education: Queen's University Belfast; University of Bristol
- Known for: Keith and Padden theory
- Awards: Polymer Physics Prize, 1973; Fellow of the American Physical Society; Fellow of the American Association for the Advancement of Science (AAAS); 1986 Fraser Price Lecturer at the University of Massachusetts Amherst
- Scientific career
- Fields: Polymer physics
- Workplaces: American Viscose Corporation; Bell Laboratories; University of Connecticut

Harvey Douglas Keith (10 March 1927 – 9 February 2003) was a British physicist and one of the primary polymer researchers over the latter half of the 20th century.

== Early UK University affiliations ==
In 1948, Keith obtained a BSc degree from Queen's University in Belfast. In 1951, he received a PhD in physics from the University of Bristol in England, where he taught optics as a lecturer in Physics between 1951 and 1956.

== Industrial career ==
Keith immigrated to the United States in 1956 after accepting a position at the American Viscose Corporation in Marcus Hook, Pennsylvania, where he began researching the complex structures and morphologies of macromolecules. There, he met his lifelong collaborator, Frank J. Padden Jr. Together, they began to examine the optical properties of spherulites from both theoretical and experimental approaches (see Spherulite).

Keith and Padden joined Bell Telephone Laboratories in Murray Hill, NJ in 1960. Not long after they arrived, they published a seminal paper on spherulitic crystallisation. They subsequently studied the crystalline structures of isotactic polypropylene, isotactic polystyrene, polyesters, various polypeptides (see Peptide), and other crystallisable polymers. In 1965, Keith and his collaborators explained the mechanical strength of polymers by discovering their intercrystalline links.

A team led by Keith led, including Padden, Lotz and Giannoni, produced the first chain-folded single DNA crystals in 1969. For this and their later work, the American Physical Society awarded its Polymer Physics Prize to Keith & Padden in 1973.

Later, he was named Head of the Analytical Chemistry Research Department at AT&T Bell Laboratories. He subsequently became Head of the Organic Materials Research Department.

== The Keith and Padden theory ==
Forming the basis of what has become known as the Keith and Padden theory, the two researchers published "Twisting orientation and the role of transient states in polymer crystallization" in 1984 and "Banding in Polyethylene and other spherulites" in 1996. These two papers addressed the long-standing problem of accounting for the origins of lamellar (a thin layer) twisting in banded polymer spherulites. The Keith and Padden theory posits that a lamella twists because each of its two halves tend to scroll in opposite directions. Their theory asserts that rather than twisting, one of the lamella's halves will shrink or waste away. This leads to a scrolled appearance instead of seeming twisted.

== Later academic research ==
After his retirement from Bell Labs in 1988, Keith continued his polymer morphology research as a faculty member at the University of Connecticut. He became a Professor Emeritus in 1996.

== Affiliations/honours ==
Keith was active as a Fellow of the American Physical Society (APS). In 1965–1966, he chaired the Polymer Physics Division, and in 1977–1985 served as the Divisional Councilor at the APS Council. He was a Fellow of the American Association for the Advancement of Science (AAAS).

In 1986, he was the Fraser Price Lecturer at the University of Massachusetts Amherst. He served on the Editorial Advisory Boards of two research journals, Macromolecules and the Journal of Polymer Science Part B.

== Death ==
On 9 February 2003, Keith died from cancer at his home in South Windsor, Connecticut, aged 75.

== See also ==
- Polymer physics
