= Komboni =

Informal housing in Zambia

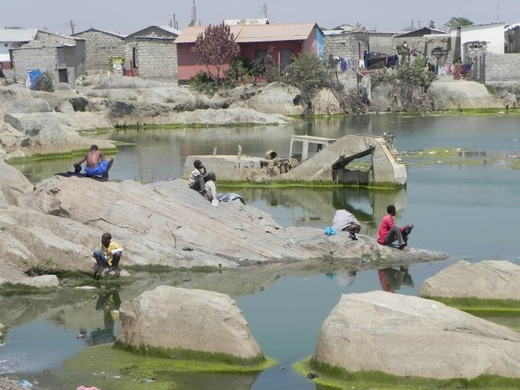
A slum in Lusaka

A komboni is a type of informal housing compound or shanty town common to Zambia, particularly the capital city of Lusaka. It is characterized by a low income and a high population density. Kombonis typically began as housing for employees of a particular company, estate, or mine. An estimated 35% of Zambians live in urban areas, and kombonis exist in many of them. It is estimated that 80% of the population of Lusaka live and work in these areas.

== History ==
Northern Zambia is part of the Copperbelt, which is a region of Africa known for copper mining. Beginning in the late 1880s, the region was largely dependent on copper mining. The increasing development of copper mining led to rapid urbanization and industrialization from the 1920s through the 1950s. Many new towns such as Ndola, Kitwe, Chingola, Luanshya, Mufulira, and Bancroft sprung up in the Copperbelt, each of them associated with a different copper mine or smelter and consisting of a planned "garden city" for their white residents and compounds housing male African workers, who came to work on the mines, usually for a period of six months, before returning home to their villages. The compounds were similar to army barracks, and the workers (who generally only spoke their own languages) corrupted the word "Compound" into "Komboni".

The mining towns were typically under the direct control of mining companies such as The Rhokana Corporation or Anglo-American, which provided social services and urban management. In many cases there were effectively "twin towns", one a mine town, such as Nkana, with the adjacent "civilian" town of Kitwe, lived in by people engaged in other occupations unrelated to the mines.

With Independence in 1964, the mines were nationalised and came under the control of Zambia Consolidated Copper Mines, ZCCM. The mines were subsequently re-privatized in 1997, beginning a series of changes to the structure and administration of those cities. Under ZCCM, houses were assigned to employees based on employee rank and family size. Higher-ranking employees were assigned housing in nicer neighborhoods, while lower ranking employees were assigned housing in the kombonis. After privatization of the mines, employees were offered the homes they were occupying at subsidized prices which were deducted from their severance packages. Privatization of the mines created an economic disruption, with the mines' new owners often employing reduced workforces. This caused a crisis, and now many neighborhoods are no longer as economically homogeneous as they once were.

Moving from the kombonis to the nicer areas of the towns (known as kumayadi) often entailed a change of lifestyle, such as avoiding cooking fish in the house because the fish makes the house smell like the komboni. The culture of kombonis is often seen as different or more traditional than life outside the kombonis, with more traditional gender roles.

=== Lusaka ===
Lusaka has been considered a poorly planned city, which grew slowly and in ways its planners failed to anticipate. (Note: In 1952 a British architect said of Lusaka that "It represents all that should not be done. 'Horrific" would not be too strong a word." In 1955 the Central African Post proclaimed Lusaka "a town which even its fondest son could never call beautiful".) It was founded in 1905 as a railway station named for a local leader, and did not officially become a town until 1913. In the 1930s it was named the capital of Northern Rhodesia and was redesigned with the intentions of making it a "Garden City for Africa". The intention was to have large open spaces, large building plots for European homes, and limited, much smaller housing plots for Africans. Like the other Zambian cities mentioned above, Lusaka consisted of "garden city" areas for white settlers and a village for the African employees of white settlers. However, planned African areas were insufficient for the number of Africans in the city, even when the city was first planned. Between the end of World War II and 2010, Lusaka grew from under 200,000 people to over 1.7 million as of the 2010 census, although there are estimates that the actual population is over 2 million. The vast majority of this increase in population happened in informal, unauthorized areas, on land that had been designated as belonging to white-owned commercial farms or industries. The white owners of these areas were permitted to house their employees on their compounds, or kombonis.

Because the compounds were on land belonging to white owners or businesses on which their employees were permitted to live, many of the kombonis are named after their colonial owners or the business they ran, leading to names like John Howard, Misisi (meaning The Mrs.), and Ng'ombe (meaning cows, because the area was used as a cow pasture).

After Zambian independence in the 1960s the government attempted to replace the kombonis with planned neighborhoods of public housing, but the informal areas grew quicker and even the planned areas lapsed into informality.

== Kombonis today ==
Approximately 80% of residents of Lusaka live in one of 37 kombonis. These areas typically have poor quality overcrowded housing, inadequate public services, limited access to water, poor sanitation, few healthcare facilities, and limited access to employment.

Kombonis in Lusaka include neighborhoods like Garden Compound, which sprang up in the planned outflow area from the city's sewage treatment plant, and Misisi, which is very difficult to get to because of a lack of roads, and is surrounded by piles of rotting garbage.

Lusaka was originally intended to be a garden city, with many trees planted in the planned white neighborhoods. The city government has made sporadic efforts to maintain a garden atmosphere and to extend it to the kombonis, but with limited effect. People in the kombonis tend not to be interested in ornamental trees planted and maintained by the city council; fruit trees, on the other hand, tend to do better in those areas. At one time Lusaka had rules against crops in residential areas, but maize and other crops are frequently grown in the kombonis, and are sometimes defended with violence.

In the wealthier elite neighborhoods of Lusaka such as Kalundu most properties (96% in Kalundu) have a cement wall around the property. In the kombonis far fewer properties have walls to mark their boundaries; only 22% in Kalingalinga and 11% in Misisi. Although residents in Kalingalinga lacked walls, 47% at least marked the boundaries of their property with a hedge, whereas less than 15% of residents in Misisi did, and some 2/3 of property boundaries in Misisi were unmarked.

Kombonis tend to be cut off from pedestrian routes through wealthier areas, and distant from good roads. The wealthier, planned neighborhoods often have high walls separating them from nearby kombonis, as a new development known as Meanwood Ibex will be separated from the neighboring komboni Kalikiliki. As is common in slums and ghettos worldwide, a new road network planned to encircle Lusaka will likely displace residents in many kombonis and bifurcate communities. Roads in the wealthier planned neighborhoods tend to be logical, laid out following a grid or other logical system, whereas in the kombonis the roads tend to be irregular, often lacking names or signs. Commercial maps often place advertisements over kombonis, making it impossible to use the maps to navigate those areas. Public transportation in Lusaka tends to take passengers from the kombonis to downtown, but not to other kombonis. People in the komobonis may feel they lack a voice in politics.

Kombonis tend to have relatively few industries or formal businesses located within them, leading residents to depend on an informal economy or commute for their livelihoods. Paid employment for people in these areas is difficult to find and often exploitative in nature. Many people living in kombonis attempt to start businesses, with a study in Chawama finding roughly 25% of people between 15-35 running their own business and 77% indicating a desire to do so in the future. However, they are limited by lack of education, training, funding, and business support services.

In recent decades China has invested heavily in Africa generally, and Zambia in particular. Modern housing projects are being built on top of older compounds. Not all of the newer construction displaces komboni residents however; a development known as Meanwood grew out of a farm owned by the Galoun Family, which was one of the largest white landowners in the 1930s and one of the few that did not allow kombonis to be built on their land. The standard of housing in these new developments is substantially higher than the standard of living in kombonis. As komboni residents are displaced from areas like Ng'ombe, they move to other kombonis, further expanding these informal areas.

The class separation of Lusaka and the unplanned nature of kombonis can lead to violent clashes. In 2013 violence broke out in Kampasa, an informal komboni built between land belonging to Galounia Farm and agricultural land owned by the Zambia National Service (ZNS). The Galoun family and ZNS each gave land to a Chinese company to begin a farming project. With no warning, armed forces with the ZNS showed up at Kampasa at 4:00 a.m. and began to demolish houses and opened fire on the residents, who had long been day laborers at the farm or ZNS.

=== Komboni Radio ===
In 2013 a new radio station began broadcasting, calling itself Komboni Radio. Komboni Radio aims to reach people in the kombonis and be the "voice of the people." Komboni Radio does this by using street language, which is a mix of English, Nyanja and Bemba, and by offering the lowest advertising rates in the industry. It also offers small entrepreneurs the ability to engage in collective advertising, and it uses local musicians as DJs.

== See also ==
- Favela
- Ghetto
