= Florence McKeown =

Northern Irish physician and pathologist

- Born: Elizabeth Florence McKeown; 1 June 1918; Belfast, United Kingdom
- Died: 9 June 2008 (aged 90)
- Occupation: Pathologist

Academic background
- Education: Queen's University Belfast; Royal Victoria Hospital, Belfast

Academic work
- Discipline: Pathology
- Sub-discipline: Rheumatic cardiovascular disease
- Institutions: Queen's University Belfast; Royal Victoria Hospital, Belfast; Belfast City Hospital

Elizabeth Florence McKeown (1 June 1918 – 9 June 2008) was a Northern Irish pathologist who was Professor of Morbid Anatomy at Queen's University Belfast.

== Biography ==
Elizabeth Florence McKeown was born on 1 June 1918 in Belfast; her parents were Mary (née Lyons) and Robert Lemon McKeown, the latter of whom a missionary. After spending her secondary education at Victoria College, Belfast, she received her MB BCh BAO degree at Queen's University Belfast in 1942.

After returning to Queen's as an assistant in pathology, she was promoted to lecturer in 1947, before receiving a further promotion to reader in 1954. Eventually, in 1967 she was granted a personal appointment as Professor of Morbid Anatomy, making her the university's "first woman to be appointed to a permanent academic position in medicine". In 1952, she became a consultant pathologist at Royal Victoria Hospital, Belfast, where she had spent her residency, before eventually moving to the Belfast City Hospital. Richard Froggatt noted that "she was one of only seven permanent woman appointments in the entire 1940s".

In 1965, McKeown published Pathology of the Aged, a study on the autopsies of 1,500 patients over seventy years of age. Pathologist Roy Cameron described McKeown as a "noted contributor" to rheumatic cardiovascular disease. McKeown joined The Journal of Pathology and Bacteriology editorial board in 1967. She was also part of the British Cardiovascular Society and the Pathological Society.

She was made a Fellow of the Royal College of Pathologists in 1963 and a Fellow of the Royal College of Physicians in 1974.

McKeown died on 9 June 2008, eight days after his 90th birthday. She remained unmarried throughout her life. She is the aunt of art historian Simon McKeown.
