= Paddy Agnew (rugby union) =

Irish rugby union player (1942–2019)

- Full name: Patrick Joseph Agnew
- Born: 18 March 1942 Clady, Northern Ireland
- Died: 15 November 2019 (aged 77) Belfast, Northern Ireland

Rugby union career
- Position: Prop
International career
| Years | Team | Apps | (Points) |
| 1974–76 | Ireland | 2 | (0) |

Patrick Joseph Agnew (18 March 1942 — 15 November 2019) was an Ireland rugby union international prop from Northern Ireland who played for CIYMS, Bangor and Ulster.

Eldest of six children, Agnew grew up in Clady, Co. Londonderry, and Andersonstown, Belfast. He attended both St Mary's CBS and St Malachy's College in Belfast.

Agnew was an All-Ireland judo champion and competed at the 1967 European Judo Championships, before taking up rugby union at the advanced age of 26 for the CIYMS fourths.

A loosehead prop, Agnew was capped twice for Ireland. He made his debut as a replacement against France at the Parc des Princes in the 1974 Five Nations and started against Australia at Lansdowne Road in 1976. Work commitments prevented him from going on the 1974 British Lions tour to South Africa.

== See also ==
- List of Ireland national rugby union players
