= Barry Kelly (physician) =

Northern Irish radiologist (1961–2025)

Barry E. Kelly (14 June 1961 – 22 June 2025) was a radiologist and university professor in medicine from Northern Ireland.

== Life and career ==
Barry Kelly was born in Belfast on 14 June 1961. He attended St. Mary's Christian Brothers' Grammar School, Belfast. He then attended the medical school at Queen's University, Belfast from which he graduated in 1984. He obtained specialist training in surgery obtaining fellowships of the relevant royal colleges FRCSEd, FFRRCSI.

He subsequently moved into radiology and received training and qualification (FRCR). He was appointed as consultant radiologist to the Belfast Trust in 1995. He was appointed visiting professor of radiology at Ulster University.

His radiological interests included imaging in acute medicine, surgery, trauma and the ICU environment.

Kelly died from cancer on 22 June 2025, at the age of 64.

== Publications ==
- The History of Medicine, Money, and Politics: Riding the Rollercoaster of State Medicine. Ulster Medical Journal, 01 Jan 2009, 78(1):77-77.
- Abdominal x rays made easy: iatrogenic, accidental, and incidental objects, BMJ.

== Honorary positions ==
- Dean, Faculty of Radiologists, RCSI (2012–2014)
- Editor, Ulster Medical Journal (2011–2015)
