= Daniel McCaughan =

Daniel V. McCaughan OBE is an electronic engineer, executive and researcher.

McCaughan was born in Belfast where he attended St. Mary's Christian Brothers' Grammar School, Belfast. He proceeded to Queen's University Belfast from which he obtained a BSc (Hons) followed by PhD in physics. In 1992, he was awarded a D.Sc. He is a Chartered Engineer and a Chartered Physicist.

He then worked in a number of electronic engineering businesses conducting and directing research and development. He was a member of technical staff at Bell Telephone Laboratories from 1968 to 1974 and then became a Senior Principal in the UK Ministry of Defence developing silicon technology. In the 1980s he moved to GEC Marconi, where he became Technical Director of GEC Electronic Devices Ltd, EEV and MEDL, joined STC PLC in 1988, and in the 1990s became Chief Scientist in Nortel Technology. McCaughan has been awarded over 20 patents. He has published over 100 academic papers and book chapters on both technical and managerial subjects.

He was a Visiting Professor and then a Professorial Fellow at Queen's University Belfast from the 1970s till 2016.

== Awards ==
- OBE, for contribution to technology
- Chartered Engineer
- Fellow, Institute of Physics
- Fellow of the Institution of Engineering and Technology
- Fellow, Institution of Engineers of Ireland
- Fellow, Royal Aeronautical Society
- Fellow of the Royal Academy of Engineering
- Fellow, Irish Academy of Engineering
- Fellow Royal Photographic Society, Accredited Senior Imaging Scientist
