= Richard McLaughlin (lawyer) =

Richard McLaughlin (born 1947) is a former High Court Judge in Northern Ireland and held various senior legal positions.

Richard McLaughlin was born in Belfast in 1947 where he attended St Mary's Christian Brothers' Grammar School, Belfast. He then proceeded to Queen's University Belfast where he obtained his LL.B. in 1970. He obtained an LL.M. from the University of Strathclyde in 1997.

In 1999, he was appointed a Judge of the Supreme Court of Judicature of Northern Ireland, a post which he held until his retirement in 2012.

He also held various other senior legal positions in Northern Ireland including deputy Chair of the Boundary Commission for Northern Ireland, Chair of Servicing the Legal System which was established to improve access to legal information, Member of the Judicial Studies Board (now the Judicial Council) and Chair of the Bar Council of Northern Ireland. He was appointed a member of the Investigatory Powers Tribunal in 2014.

He is a Fellow of the Chartered Institute of Arbitrators.
