= Bartley Powell =

British graphic designer (1920–1977)

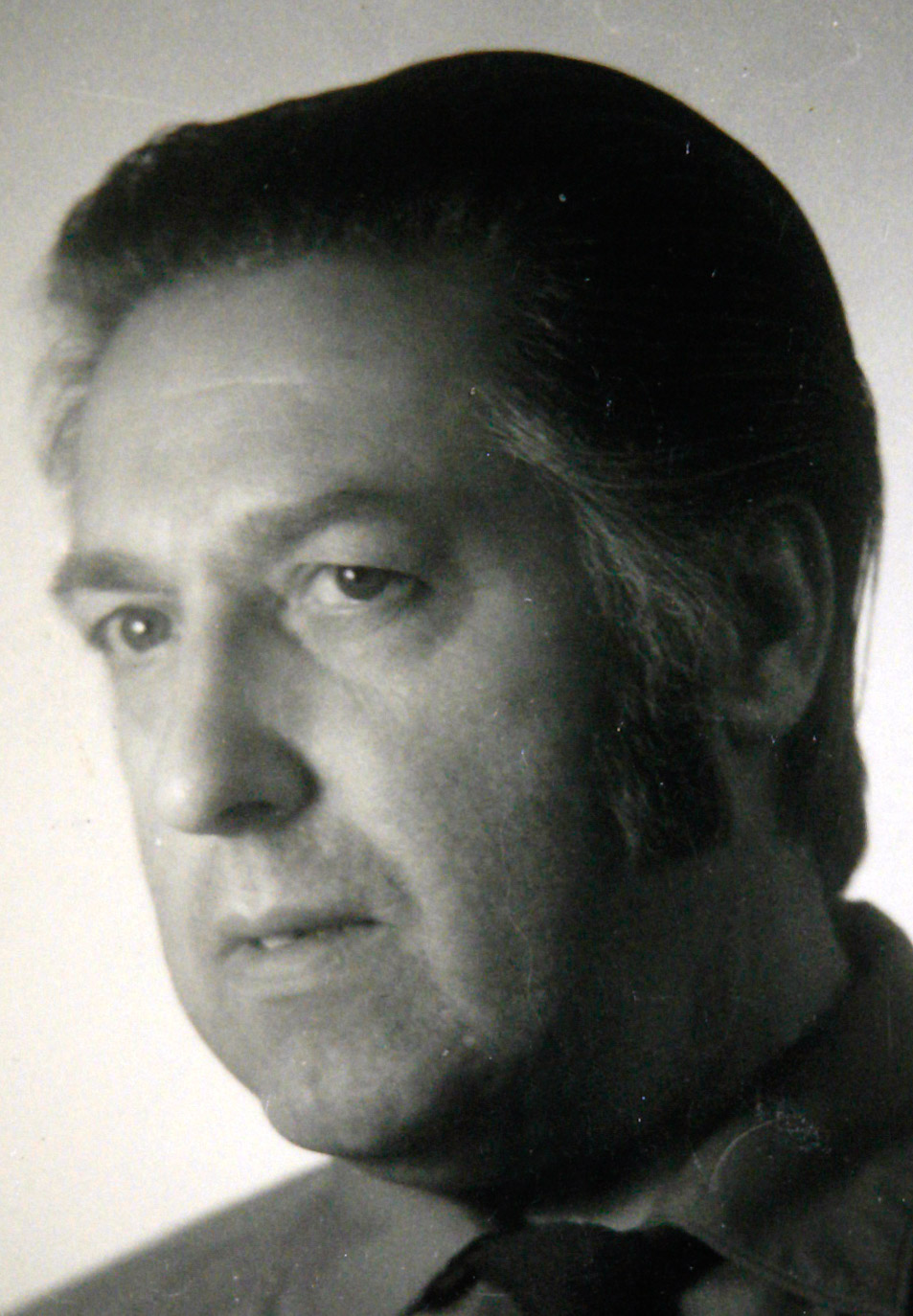
- Born: 6 June 1920; Manchester, England, Great Britain
- Died: 2 August 1977 (aged 57); Richmond, Surrey, England
- Occupations: Production artist, graphic artist
- Known for: Advertising, book design, branding, illustration, page layout, typography

Percy Bartley Powell (born Bartley Powell; 6 June 1920 – 2 August 1977) was a graphic designer for Great Britain from the 1940s to 1977, a professional within the graphic design and graphic arts industry. During his career, he created graphics and illustrations for books, postal stamps, advertising, and annual reports.

== Career ==
Powell's career started during his service in the Royal Air Force. He held various teaching posts from 1944 to 1977, as a regular part-time Lecturer. While stationed in New Delhi, India he taught evening classes at Sarada Ukil School of Art from 1944 to 1946. When he returned to England he started a position as a Trade Mark Designer for Kaumagraph Co located in Manchester. From 1949 to 1954 he was the Typographer at The Cloister Press, Ltd., Manchester. From 1954 to 1956 he was Senior Designer at Newman Neame, Ltd. London.

== Early life ==
Bartley Powell was born on 13 June 1920 at 30 Green End Road, Burnage, Manchester, England. He attended the Peacock School 1925 to 1934 and private education 1934 - 1936. Married Iris Joan Cavanagh on 30 October 1954, in Manchester, moved to Kew, Surrey. Soon after they had one son Glyn Bartley Powell in 1956.

== Education ==
Powell attended the Manchester School of Art 1936 to 1940, Croydon College 1941 to 1942, and Manchester College of Arts and Technology 1946 to 1948.

== Books illustrated by Powell ==
- Dr. J. Bronowski, Atomic Fusion, Illustrated by Bartley Powell, Published by Newman Neame Take Home Books Ltd.
- Henry Smith F.H.C.I., F.I.B.B., F.A.H.I. Caterers Guide to Turkey. Illustration of Turkey on back cover. Published by The British Turkey Federation Limited, Designed by W.S. Cowell Limited Butter Market Ipswich.
- L. E. Snellgrove, Illustrations of airplanes From Kitty Hawk to Outer Space, The story of the aeroplane. London: Made and printed by William Clowes and Son, 1960.

== Awards ==
- 1 August 1949, Awarded the National Diploma in Design from the Ministry of Education.
- 1966, Awarded 'The Society of Industrial Artists'. This entitled him to use (Fellow Society of Industrial Artists) F.S.I.A.
- March 1974, received the certificate of excellence from Deco Press for the most impressive contemporary trademarks of the world.

== Exhibitions ==
Year	Exhibition	Place	Medium
1948	Staff Association Exhibition	Regional College of Art, Manchester	Spanish Child (Charcoal)
1949	Spring Exhibition Manchester Academy of Fine Arts	City Art Gallery Manchester	Portrait of a Destitute
1950	Manchester Academy of Fine Arts Exhibition	City Art Gallery Manchester	Ruins
1951	Exhibition of Drawings and Paintings by Artist from Stockport and District	War Memorial Buildings Stockport	Maria Jesus Clements—Avila

== Stamp Designs ==
Bartley Powell designed many stamps over the years of his career. Turks and Caicos Islands is an example of his work.

== Military career ==
H. M. Forces Royal Air Force 1940-1946

== Death and legacy ==
Bartley Powell died on 2 August 1977.
