= Robert N Moles =

Dr Robert (Bob) Moles (born 20 October 1949, Norwich, Norfolk, UK) is a legal academic and researcher well known for his expertise and writings on legal theory and miscarriages of justice. He has published books mainly in the areas of miscarriages of justice. He had worked as a legal researcher on the release of Henry Keogh. He has also been heavily involved in other miscarriages of justice cases such as Derek Bromley and Frits Van Beelan via his Networked Knowledge project. The purpose of the project is to 'investigate and report upon alleged serious miscarriages of justice'.

== Early life and education ==
He graduated in LLB (Hons) from Queens University, Belfast as the top student of the year in 1978. He was awarded a UK state scholarship for three years to undertake a PhD, which he did at the University of Edinburgh, where his doctoral work was supervised by D.N. MacCormick. In later years he taught law at Queens University in Belfast and also Australian National University.

His PhD thesis, Definition and Rule in Jurisprudence: A Critique of HLA Hart's Response to John Austin was later published as Definition and Rule in Legal Theory (Blackwell, 1987). The thesis critiques the work of H.L.A. Hart, with the goal of showing flaws in Hart's analysis of John Austin's Lectures on Jurisprudence (1855).

== List of publications ==
- Definition and Rule in Legal Theory: A Reassessment of H.L.A. Hart and the Positivist Tradition (Blackwell, 1987)
- There is More to Life than Logic, 1992
- A State of Injustice (Lothian, 2004)
- Losing their grip: the case of Henry Keogh (Elvis Press, 2006)
- Forensic Investigations and Miscarriages of Justice: The Rhetoric Meets the Reality (with Bibi Sangha and Kent Roach, Irwin Law, 2010)
- Miscarriages of Justice: Criminal Appeals and the Rule of Law in Australia (with Bibi Sangha, LexisNexis, 2015)
