= Adrian Guelke =

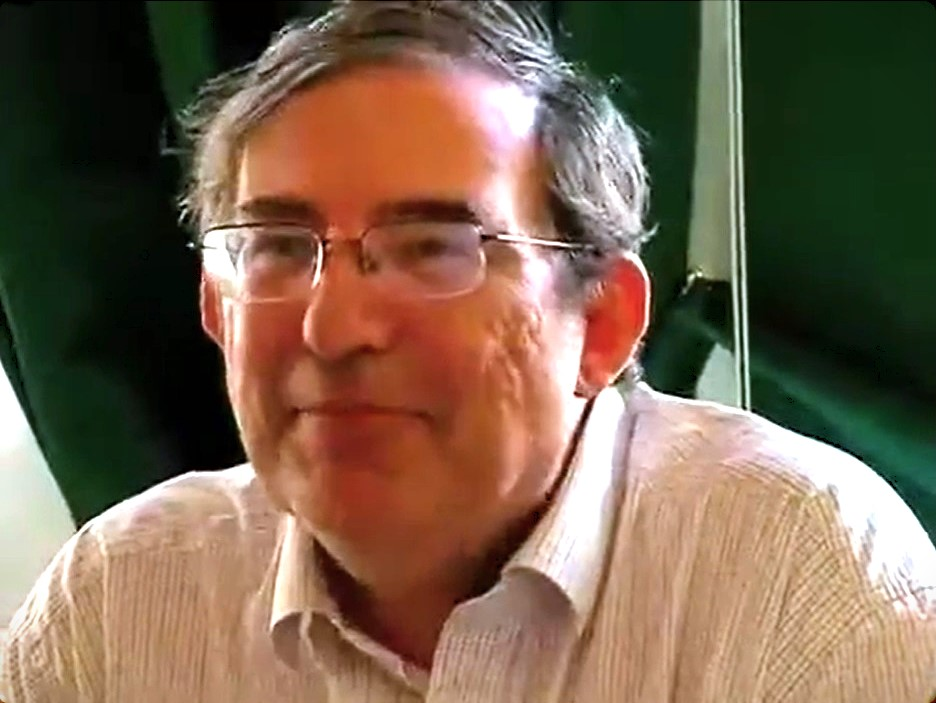
Guelke in 2016

Adrian Guelke (born 15 June 1947) is Professor of Comparative Politics in the School of Politics, International Studies and Philosophy at Queen's University Belfast, Northern Ireland. He was previously Jan Smuts Professor of International Relations at the University of the Witwatersrand, Johannesburg from 1993 to 1995. After attending Diocesan College, Rondebosch, Cape Town, he studied for his BA and MA at the University of Cape Town where he also participated in the sit-in during the Mafeje affair in 1968. He earned his PhD at the London School of Economics. His thesis, dated 1994, was titled "The age of terrorism" and the international political system, 1967-1992. He specialises in the comparative study of ethnic conflict, particularly the cases of Northern Ireland, his native South Africa and Kashmir. He is chair of the International Political Science Association's research committee on politics and ethnicity. And, as of 2013, Editor of the Academic Journal Nationalism and Ethnic Politics.

In 1991 he survived an assassination attempt at his Belfast home. Leon Flores, a member of the South African Defence Forces' intelligence branch, doctored a police report that described an academic at Queen's who was known to be involved in the IRA, substituting Guelke's name into the report. Flores then contacted the Ulster Defence Association, who attempted to shoot Guelke. He was saved because the gun used by the would-be assassin jammed. Henry McDonald and Jim Cusack report that "The UDA now acknowledges that it was being used by the South African authorities to take out a political enemy, and that Dr Guelke was innocent of the charge of aiding the IRA". The case features in Paul Larkin's book A Very British Jihad: Collusion, Conspiracy and Cover-Up in Northern Ireland. Guelke is critical of the book, arguing in a review of it that his shooting "hardly demonstrates the intimate level of collusion that [Larkin] wishes to suggest existed among the loyalists, elements of the security forces and the apartheid regime".

== Books ==
• Control of Wages in South Africa (with Stanley Siebert, 1973)
• Northern Ireland: The International Perspective (Gill and Macmillan, 1988)
• New Perspectives on the Northern Ireland Conflict (Avebury, 1994)
• The Age of Terrorism and the International Political System (IB Tauris, 1995)
• The Police, Public Order and the State: Policing in Great Britain, Northern Ireland, the Irish Republic, the USA, Israel, South Africa, and China (with Ian Hume, Edward Moxon-Browne, and Rick Wilford, 1996)
• South Africa in Transition: The Misunderstood Miracle (IB Tauris, 1999)
• A Farewell to Arms? From 'Long War' to Long Peace in Northern Ireland (edited, with Michael Cox and Fiona Stephen, Manchester University Press, 2000, 2006).
• Democracy and Ethnic Conflict: Advancing Peace in Deeply Divided Societies by Adrian Guelke (2004)
• Rethinking the Rise and Fall of Apartheid: South Africa and World Politics (Rethinking the Twentieth Century, 2005)
• Terrorism and Global Disorder (International Library of War Studies, 2006)
