= Séamus Mac Mathúna =

Irish language scholar

- Born: Séamus Mac Mathúna; 1945 (age 80–81); Belfast

Academic background
- Education: St. Mary's Christian Brothers' Grammar School, Belfast
- Alma mater: Queen's University Belfast

Academic work
- Discipline: Celtic Studies
- Sub-discipline: Irish language
- Institutions: University of Uppsala; University of Galway; Ulster University

Séamus Mac Mathúna (born 1945) is an Irish language and Irish literature scholar and university professor.

== Biography ==
Séamus Mac Mathúna was born in Belfast in 1945 where he attended St. Mary's Christian Brothers' Grammar School, Belfast. He then attended Queen's University Belfast where he obtained a B.A. (Hons) in Celtic Studies. This was followed by post-graduate research into Indo-European, Old Norse and Linguistics at the University of Zürich and the University of Iceland, Reykjavík. He was awarded a Ph.D. in Celtic Studies by Queen's University Belfast.

In 1970, he was appointed to a Lectureship in Celtic Languages and Literatures at the University of Uppsala, Sweden. He then moved to a Statutory Lecturer in Modern Irish at University College, Galway in 1976. In 1980, was appointed Professor of Irish at Ulster University from which he retired in 2014.

== Research ==
He has conducted research into Early Irish language and literature; Irish folklore; the syntax, semantics and lexicon of Irish; and Celtic links with Nordic, Slavic and Germanic cultures.

== Awards ==
- Member of the Royal Irish Academy (Vice-president 2009–13)
- Corresponding Member of the Austrian Academy of Sciences
- President of Societas Celto-Slavica
- Joint General Editor of the society's journal, Studia Celto-Slavica.

== Publications ==
These are detailed in the Bibliography of Irish Linguistics and Literature at the Dublin Institute for Advanced Studies.

- Mac Mathúna, S. (1985). Immram Brain: Bran's Journey to the Land of the Women
- Mac Mathúna, S. (1995). Collins Gem Irish Dictionary
- Ó Corráin, A., & Mac Mathúna, S. (1997). Collins Pocket Irish Dictionary
- Mac Mathúna, S. (2007). On the Definite Article and Definite Descriptions in Irish
- Mac Mathúna, S., & Corrain, A. (eds) (1997). Miscellanea Celtica in Memoriam Heinrich Wagner
- Mac Mathúna, S. (2006). Parallels between Celtic and Slavic
- Mac Mathúna, S. (2012). Ireland and Armenia: Studies in Language, History and Narrative
- Borsje, M., Dooley, A., Mac Mathúna, S., & Toner. G. (eds) (2014). Celtic Cosmology. Perspectives from Ireland and Scotland. Toronto: Pontifical Institute of Mediaeval Studies.

A Festschrift in his honour was presented to him on his 75th birthday and launched at the 17th International Symposium of Societas Celtologica Nordica held in Uppsala on 7–10 May 2020.
