= Rachael Hegarty =

Irish poet and educator (*1968)

- Born: 1968 (age 57–58)
- Citizenship: Irish
- Education: University of Massachusetts Boston; Trinity College Dublin (M.Phil.); Queen's University Belfast (PhD)
- Occupations: Poet, educator
- Website: rachaelhegarty.com

Rachael Hegarty (born 1968) is a poet and educator from the Northside of Dublin, Ireland. Rachael is the presenter for Poetry People on RTE Radio 1. She is the Poet laureate for Dublin 1.

== Early childhood ==
Born the 7th of 10 kids in Broadstone, Dublin in 1968, Hegarty's early childhood was spent between the canals. She, her mother, and her brother David survived the Talbot Street Bombing of 17 May 1974. Her family no longer felt safe in the city centre and moved to Finglas after the Dublin and Monaghan bombings.

== Education and travel ==
Hegarty's primary and secondary school education was with the Holy Faith sisters at Mother of Divine Grace and St. Michael's, Finglas. At 18 she moved to Boston, worked as a babysitter and got a scholarship to attend University of Massachusetts Boston. Hegarty returned home in 1994 and got her master's degree in Irish Literature at Trinity College Dublin. He father, Charlie, the Irish Olympic Judo coach, died suddenly in 1996. She then moved, lived, and worked in Shimane, Japan from 1996 to 1999. Hegarty returned home again in 1999 and did her master's degree in Creative Writing at Trinity College Dublin. Rachael also completed her Ph.D. at Queen's University Belfast.

== Career ==
Hegarty has been scribbling since she was a child hiding under the stairs and trying to escape housework. Her father gave her a dictionary, her siblings handed her pens and paper and her mother gave her a copy of William Blake’s Songs of Innocence and of Experience for her 13th birthday. Hegarty credits her mentor Paula Meehan for encouraging her to keep going with the poetry. Hegarty also teaches English literature, language, creative writing, and academic skills at the Trinity Access Programme and CDETB. She thinks marginalized students should be at the centre of education.

== Selected works ==
- Wild Flowers on the Darndale Roundabout (Salmon 2024
- Dancing with Memory (Salmon, 2022)
- Making Sense of Finglas (DCC 2020)
- May Day 1974 (Salmon, 2019)
- Flight Paths Over Finglas (Salmon 2017)

== Awards and honours ==
- The Shine Strong Award
- The Francis Mc Manus Prize
- The Over the Edge New Writer of the Year
- Rachael was co-selector and mentor for the 2025 Eavan Boland Award. The award honours the legacy of Eavan Boland as poet, trailblazer and teacher.
