= Barry Kelly (footballer) =

Australian rules footballer

Personal information
- Full name: Barry Kelly
- Born: 25 January 1942
- Died: 1 September 2008 (aged 66)
- Original team: Lalbert
- Height: 178 cm (5 ft 10 in)
- Weight: 80 kg (176 lb)

Playing career^{1}
Years	Club	Games (Goals)
1960–1962	North Melbourne	16 (0)
- ^{1} Playing statistics correct to the end of 1962.

Barry Kelly (25 January 1942 – 1 September 2008) was an Australian rules footballer who played for the North Melbourne Football Club in the Victorian Football League (VFL).
