= Thomas Bartley (priest) =

Catholic priest

Monsignor Thomas Bartley (1926 - 2007) was a Catholic priest and former Vicar General of the Diocese of Down and Connor.

== Career ==
He was educated at St Mary's CBGS and Queen's University, Belfast

After his ordination to the priesthood at St Patrick's College Maynooth on the 18 June 1950, he was appointed as a teacher at St Malachy's College, Belfast.

In 1951 Bartley was sent with four clerical colleagues to the new St MacNissi's College, Garron Tower. His colleagues were William Tumelty (President of the college), Charles Agnew (Bursar), Patsy McKavanagh and Brendan McGarry. St. MacNissi's College was to be his home for the next 34 years where he taught Irish and English literature.

He succeeded McGarry as President of the Garron Tower in 1979. He remained there until his appointment as parish priest of Derriaghy in August 1985. In 1994 the parish of Derriaghy was divided to make St. Anne's at Finaghy a separate parish of which Bartley became the parish priest. Subsequently, in 1996 the parish of Our Lady Queen of Peace was formed out of St. Anne's parish.

He was appointed Vicar General of the Diocese of Down and Connor in 1986 and remained as parish priest of St. Anne's for 17 years until his retirement in August 2002. He was most anxious to continue in full-time ministry and he was appointed full-time curate in Carryduff while also assisting in St. Bernadette's.

As parish priest and Vicar-General he continued his deep interest in education assisting in the opening of Aquinas Diocesan Grammar School, the primary school in the new parish of Christ the Redeemer and the development of St. Colm's High School in the parish of St. Luke's in Twinbrook as well as continuing as Governor of St. MacNissi's College.

He died on the 31 October 2007.
