= Jack Hannaway =

English footballer

Personal information
- Full name: Jack Hannaway
- Date of birth: 22 October 1927
- Place of birth: Bootle, England
- Date of death: 2 July 2007 (aged 79)
- Place of death: Liverpool, England
- Positions: Wing half; full back

Senior career*
Years	Team	Apps	(Gls)
1951–1957	Manchester City	64	(0)
1957–1960	Gillingham	126	(4)
1960–1962	Southport	73	(2)
1962–196?	Lancaster City		
- * Club domestic league appearances and goals

Jack Hannaway (22 October 1927 – 2 July 2007) was an English footballer who played as a wing half or full back. He made more than 250 Football League appearances for Manchester City, Gillingham and Southport in an eleven-year professional career.
