= John Hannaway =

Irish senior accountant (born 1958)

John Hannaway (born 1958) is an Irish senior accountant from Belfast, Northern Ireland.

== Early life and education ==
Hannaway was born in the Rock Street district of the Falls Road, Belfast, in 1984. He attended St Mary's Christian Brothers' Grammar School, Belfast, and afterwards Queen's University Belfast (1976–1979), from which he graduated with a B.Sc. (Hons.) in economics and accountancy.

== Career ==
In 1988, he became a partner in Cooper and Lybrand (now PWC) at the age of 30 years. On retirement in 2013 he established HCA Chartered Accountants.

== Awards and recognition ==
- 2011: Elected president of Chartered Accountants Ireland
- 2013: Chairman, Ulster Society, Chartered Accountants
- 2022: Awarded Accountant of the Year in the Irish Accountancy Awards
