= Declan McCavana =

Irish scholar

Declan McCavana (born 1963) is a French language scholar and professor from Northern Ireland.

== Career ==
Declan McCavana was born in Belfast, Northern Ireland in 1963. He attended St. Mary's Christian Brothers' Grammar School, Belfast and then Trinity College Dublin from which he obtained a B.A. (Hons) in French.

He then moved to France where he initially taught as a ‘lecteur d’anglais’ at the Sorbonne and at Ecole Normale Supérieure. He is the founder and Honorary President of the French Debating Association (FDA).

== Awards ==
- 2015: MBE For services to the promotion of the English language in France
