= Roger Penn =

British sociologist and writer (1949–2026)

- Born: Roger David Penn; 1949; Lytham, Lancashire, England
- Died: 12 July 2026
- Education: Jesus College, Cambridge; Brown University; Trinity Hall, Cambridge
- Occupations: Sociologist, writer
- Children: 3

Roger David Penn (1949 – 12 July 2026) was a British sociologist and writer.

== Early life and career ==
Penn was born in Lytham, Lancashire in 1949, the son of Sidney Penn, a mechanical engineer at the United Kingdom Atomic Energy Authority, and Olga Johnson. He attended grammar school in Biggleswade, Bedfordshire. He also attended Jesus College, Cambridge, graduating in 1972, and he earned his MA degree in sociology at Brown University in 1973.

In 1977, Penn served as a lecturer in the department of sociology at Lancaster University, and in 1982, he earned his PhD degree at Trinity Hall, Cambridge. He then served as a professor at the Queen's University Belfast from 2012 to 2017. As a writer, he wrote the books Skilled Workers in the Class Structure, Trade Unionism in Recession, and Class, Power and Technology: Skilled Workers in Britain and America.

== Personal life and death ==
Penn was married, and had three children. His marriage lasted until his death in 2026.

Penn died on 12 July 2026, at the age of 77.
