= Northern Ireland Public Services Ombudsman =

Public body in Northern Ireland

Agency overview
- Formed: 22 December 1969 (as the Northern Ireland Commissioner for Complaints)
- Jurisdiction: Northern Ireland
- Headquarters: Progressive House, 33 Wellington Pl, Belfast
- Employees: 47 (2022/23)
- Agency executive: Margaret Kelly, Northern Ireland Public Services Ombudsman
- Website: www.nipso.org.uk

The office of the Northern Ireland Public Services Ombudsman (NIPSO), formerly known as the Northern Ireland Ombudsman, was first established in Northern Ireland in 1969. The role of an independent ombudsman was originally created as a response to the Northern Ireland civil rights movement, and complaints of institutional bias and discrimination in the areas of housing and jobs.

Among the office's governing statutes were the Commissioner for Complaints Act (Northern Ireland) 1969, and the later Ombudsman (Northern Ireland) Order 1996 and Commissioner for Complaints (Northern Ireland) Order 1996. In April 2016, under the Public Services Ombudsman Act (Northern Ireland) 2016, the Office of Northern Ireland Public Services Ombudsman (NIPSO) was established to consolidate the former offices of Assembly Ombudsman and Commissioner for Complaints into a single office. The act also expanded the functions of the newly consolidated office.

The ombudsman's function is to investigate complaints about most public services in Northern Ireland. The complainant must usually have exhausted the complaints process of the public body first. The Ombudsman may look at complaints about health care, social care, education, housing, local and central government, and on the clinical judgment of health and social care professionals.

Previous holders of the office have included Stephen McGonagle, Jill McIvor, Gerry Burns, Maurice Hayes, Tom Frawley, and Marie Anderson. Since mid-2020, the ombudsman has been Margaret Kelly.
