= Edmund Rice Schools Trust =

Catholic school network in the Republic of Ireland

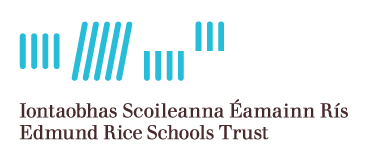
- Native name: Iontaobhas Scoileanna Éamainn Rís
- Industry: Education
- Founded: June 1802; 223 years ago in Waterford, Ireland
- Founder: Edmund Rice
- Headquarters: Blackrock, Dublin, Ireland
- Number of locations: 96 (2013)
- Area served: Republic of Ireland
- Key people: Gerry Bennett (CEO); Helen O'Brien; Louise Callaghan; Eddie Bourke
- Revenue: 1,668,652 euro (2020)
- Total assets: 140,120,145 euro (2024)
- Number of employees: 9 (2024)
- Website: www.erst.ie

The Edmund Rice Schools Trust (ERST) is a Catholic school network with responsibility for almost 100 schools in the Republic of Ireland. The trust is named after Edmund Ignatius Rice the founder of the Irish Christian Brothers who originally established and maintained the schools. Today, the Trust supports those schools in line with the tenets of the Edmund Rice Schools Trust Charter. Similar trusts have been established in England, Northern Ireland and elsewhere.

The main object of the Trust is to ensure and foster the advancement of education and to further the aims and purposes of Catholic education in the Edmund Rice tradition in colleges, schools and other educational projects owned or operated by the Trusts in the different countries.

== Northern Ireland ==
The Edmund Rice Schools Trust (NI) Ltd is the trustee body responsible for eight schools in Belfast, Glengormley, Armagh, Newry and Omagh:

- Christian Brothers Primary School, Armagh
- John Paul II Primary School, Belfast
- St. Patrick's Primary School, Belfast
- Abbey Christian Brothers' Grammar School, Newry
- All Saints College, Belfast
- Edmund Rice College, Glengormley
- Christian Brothers Grammar School, Omagh
- St. Mary's Christian Brothers' Grammar School, Belfast

These schools were formerly under the trusteeship of the Irish Christian Brothers. The Trust was launched in February 2009 and is based in the Westcourt Centre, Belfast.
