= Patrick MacAlister =

Irish prelate (1826–1895)

The Most Reverend Patrick MacAlister
- Bishop of Down and Connor
- Church: Catholic Church
- Archdiocese: Archdiocese of Armagh
- Diocese: Diocese of Down and Connor
- In office: 1886–1895
- Predecessor: Patrick Dorrian
- Successor: Henry Henry
- Previous post: Parish Priest Ballycastle, County Antrim

Orders
- Ordination: 18 September 1852
- Consecration: 28 March 1886 by Thomas Nulty

Personal details
- Born: County Down
- Died: 26 March 1895 Belfast

Patrick McAlister (1826–1895) was an Irish Roman Catholic prelate and 24th lord bishop of Down and Connor.

== Education and priestly ministry ==
McAlister was born in Bonecastle, parish of Down, and was baptised by Fr Cornelius Denvir (afterwards Bishop of Down and Connor) on 12 April 1826. He studied in St. Malachy's College and then entered the Logic Class in St Patrick's College, Maynooth on 27 August 1848. He was ordained in Clarendon Street Chapel, Dublin, by Bishop John Francis Willian Whelan OCD Roman Catholic Archdiocese of Bombay on 18 September 1852 and was given his first appointment as Curate of Ballymena on 18 November 1852. He was sent on a temporary mission, as locum tenens to Glenravel, while the priest there was engaged in building St Patrick's Church in the Braid, where he officiated from December 1853 until March 1854. He returned to Ballymena and, after a few months, was appointed Curate of the Lower Ards, April 1854.

He was appointed Curate of Ahoghill in October 1856, but sent to take charge of Ballymoney parish until Father McErlain, the recently appointed parish priest could arrive, which did not occur until 10 March 1857. He was then curate of Ahoghill until May 1858, when he was appointed Administrator of Holywood and Ballymacarrett, while Father Killen, the parish priest, was administering the parish of Belfast for Dr Denvir. Father McAlister caught scarlatina in Holywood when discharging his duties and was sometime off the mission through sickness. He afterwards officiated two months in Saul, three months in Ballymena and four months in Glenravel; after which be was re-appointed to the curacy of Holywood and Barlymacarret; from that mission he was appointed parish priest of Ballycastle, County Antrim on 2 September 1862.

Bishop Patrick Dorrian died at his residence in Chichester Park, Belfast, 3 November 1885, at 7 a.m. and three days late he was interred within the chancel of St Patrick's Church, Belfast. At a meeting of the parish priests held in the chapel of St. Malachy's College immediately after Bishop Dorrian's funeral, McAlister was elected Vicar Capitular of Down and Connor. It was then customary that the Chapter of the vacant See elected three persons, styled respectively Dignus, Dignior and Dignissimus who, after approval of the bishops of the province were sent to the Pope, whose selection almost always fell on the Dignissimus. On 26 November 1885, the parish priests assembled in St. Malachy's College and elected Alexander McMullan, by 8 votes as Dignus, John McErlaine by 9 votes as Dignior, and Patrick McAlister by 24 votes as Dignissimus for selection by the Pope for the vacant bishopric. Also there were two votes for Richard Marner, 2 votes for Dr Henry Henry, president of the Diocesan College (St. Malachy's), and 1 vote for Michael Logue, Bishop of Raphoe.

== Episcopal ministry ==
McAlister was appointed bishop on 28 February 1886 and consecrated in St Patrick's Church, Belfast on Sunday, 28 March 1886.

The consecrating prelate was the Most Rev. Dr. Nulty, Bishop of Meath, who was assisted by the Most Rev. Dr. Donnelly, Bishop of Clogher, and the Most Rev. Dr Woodlock, Bishop of Ardagh and Clonmacnoise. The sermon on the occasion was preached by the most Rev. Dr. Logue, Bishop of Raphoe. The Roman Catholic Primate of All Ireland, Dr. McGettigan, was present but on account of the state of his health did not officiate.

When McAlister, on 9 July 1886, made his first episcopal visitation of the parish of Ramoan, a deputation of the parishioners waited on him at the Parochial House for the purpose of reading to him an address and presenting him with a pectoral Cross and Chain. The following is a copy of the address : –

"My Lord, – It is with sentiments of the deepest filial affection that we, your own beloved parishioners, desire to bid your lordship a hearty welcome to-day, and to express our thanks that Almighty God, although depriving us of a loving pastor, has been pleased to place the mitre of this illustrious diocese on the head of one so learned so patriotic, and so holy".

"My Lord, your life for the past 23 years has been entirely devoted to our service, you have raised in our midst a magnificent Church, of which we are justly proud, and which, together with the Parochial House and Schools, you have given us, shall long remain a monument of your energy and zeal. But your Lordship's efforts to promote the glory of God did not rest here you also endeavoured constantly and earnestly, both by word and example, to instil into our hearts a great love for God, and an undying devotion to our holy Faith".

"My Lord, we had vainly hoped that after giving the brightest days of your life to us, those which yet remain might have been ours as well. But the hand of God has raised you to a more exalted position and we sincerely pray that He may grant you long years of health and happiness to rule your faithful people".

"We beg you will he pleased to accept, as a slight token of our deep love for you, the accompanying Pectoral Cross and Chain, and that you will ever regard us as your own especial care, and Ballycastle as your home".

The bishop, in the course of his reply, said –

"

The chain and cross, which were manufactured to the order and special design of Messrs Campbell & Company, Jewellers, Belfast, are exquisitely finished. On the centre of the cross, which is Celtic in form, are enamelled the arms of Down and Connor, while on the right and left arms are engravings of Saints Patrick and Brigid, the patrons of the parish of Ramoan. On the circle of the cross is the motto "in hoc signo vinces" and on the back the following inscription, "This Pectoral Cross and Chain The gift of his parishioners to the Right Rev,. Patrick McAlister, on the occasion of his Episcopal Consecration, 28 March 1886".

== Civic affairs ==
McAlister was, by virtue of his vocation, leader of the Catholic community in urban, north-east Ulster. As was common with Irish bishops of his era, he viewed his leadership not only as spiritual but political as well. He fought to win for Catholic ratepayers the same voice in civic affairs that their Protestant fellow citizens enjoyed. McAlister was Bishop of Down and Connor for only nine years, but during that episcopate he had to cope with the worst riots of the 19th century in Belfast, triggered by the home rule bill of 1886. Thirty-two people lost their lives, and much damage was done to property. Catholic-owned public houses were particularly vulnerable.

Four years later McAlister confronted the supporters of Charles Stewart Parnell and on 15 August 1891, he established the Irish News as a rival to the Belfast Morning News in order to promote the anti-Parnell nationalist cause. Thereafter there was a serious schism within Belfast Catholicism/nationalism.

In 1895, despite his own illness, McAlister arranged for new premises and expansion of the Mater Infirmorum Hospital.

MacAlister died on 26 March 1895.
