= St. Malachy's Church =

St. Malachy's Church may refer to:

- Saint Malachy's Church, Belfast, a Catholic Church in Northern Ireland
- Saint Malachy's Roman Catholic Church, in Manhattan, United States
