= St Malachy's College =

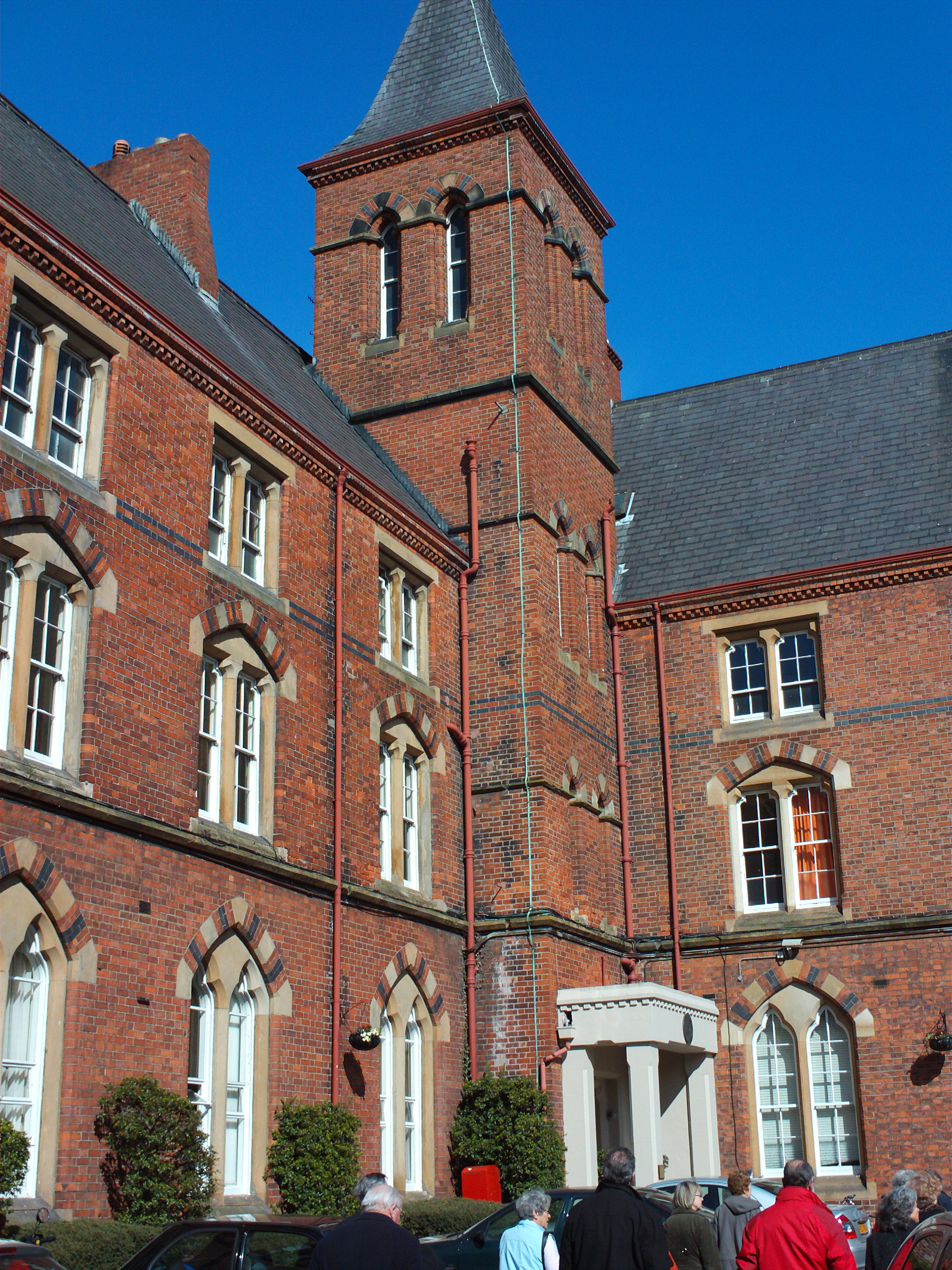
- St. Malachy's College front exterior

Location
- 36 Antrim Road; Belfast, BT15 2AE; Northern Ireland; 54.6089°N 5.9403°W

Information
- Type: Grammar school
- Motto: Gloria Ab Intus (Glory from within)
- Religious affiliation: Roman Catholic
- Established: 1833; 193 years ago
- Closed: July – August
- Local authority: Education Authority
- Principal: Deirdre McCusker
- Years taught: Year 8 – Year 14
- Gender: Male
- Age: 11 to 18
- Enrollment: 1,025 (approx)
- Colour
- Athletics: Badminton, basketball, Cross country running, Gaelic, golf, hurling, rugby, soccer, swimming, volleyball, waterpolo
- Team name: St Malachys Old Boys FC
- Alumni: Malachians
- Website: www.stmalachyscollege.com

St Malachy's College, in Belfast, Northern Ireland, is a Catholic diocesan college, a state grammar school within the Northern Ireland secondary schooling system. The college's alumni and students are known as Malachians.

== History ==
The college, founded by Bishop William Crolly, opened on the feast of Saint Malachy, 3 November 1833 four years after a Roman Catholic Relief Act ("Catholic Emancipation") removed the last of Penal Laws that had, until 1782, outlawed Catholic education.

The college, opened under the superintendence of Cornelius Denvir, has been on the same site since 1833 when Bishop Crolly took the lease on an eleven-acre site on the northern fringes of the then small Georgian town – Vicinage House – which today is recalled on the street next to the college, Vicinage Park. Vicinage Farm was owned by Thomas McCabe, a watchmaker by trade, an advocate of Catholic Emancipation and parliamentary reform, and a founder member in 1791 of the Society of United Irishmen.

One of the glories of the college is the chapel, built in the 1882 (at the same time as the distinctive College tower) which was significantly enhanced for the college centenary in 1933 when 32 stained glasses windows from the Harry Clarke studio were commissioned. Installation took place between 1935 and 1937 and today this is one of the finest collections of stained glass in Northern Ireland.

== Location and campus ==
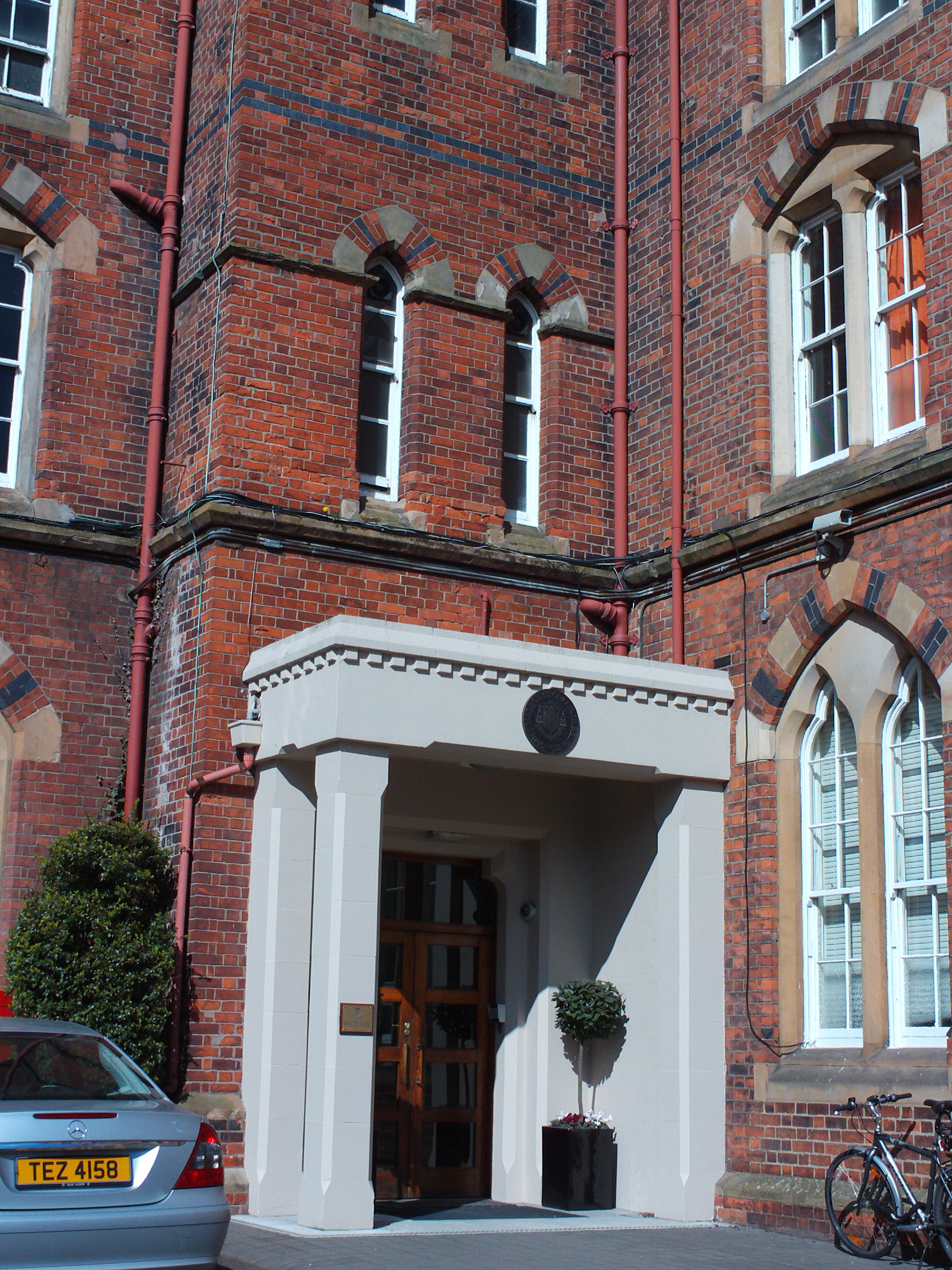
College front entrance

St Malachy's College is located in the Oldpark electoral area of north Belfast, between two main roads (the A6 Antrim Road and the A52 Crumlin Road), close to where they meet at Carlisle Circus.

The grounds of the college are accessed primarily from a tree-lined avenue on the Antrim Road, which leads to the front quadrangle, known as "the quad". The foremost building, which comprises 3 sides of the quadrangle and faces westward, is the oldest part of the college and dates to its earliest days in the 1860s. 'A' and 'B' blocks, housing the History, Classics and Drama departments, as well as administrative offices, the library, and the chapel, take up much of these three sides; the remaining rooms consist of priests' apartments, former dormitories and the Upper Study Hall.

The more modern seminary building (see below) completes the fourth side of the quadrangle. The college canteen and Music block are also accessed through the front quadrangle.

The concreted back quadrangle, bounded by the College Hall (westward), the gymnasium (northward) and the old building (southward and eastward), has in recent years been enhanced by several flower beds. The Mater Infirmorum hospital, and a small shrine to the Virgin Mary, both overlook the back quadrangle. The College Hall is the focal point of dramatic productions within the college, as well as assemblies and examinations. In recent years, the college's music department has eschewed the College Hall for its annual concerts, in favour of the more acoustically advantaged Ulster Hall in Bedford Street.

Behind the College Hall is 'D' block, completed in the 1960s, and the adjoining 'E' block, completed in the 1970s. Both consist largely of standard classrooms, with the exception of Physics laboratories on the top floor of 'D' block and Biology laboratories on the top floor of 'E' block. Since the 1980s, the second floor of 'E' block has also become home to the Computing department. The school's Lecture Theatre is on the ground floor of 'E' block. 'C' block, located to the north of 'E' block, was opened in the 1990s and replaced a row of temporary classrooms from the 1950s. It now houses the Chemistry, Art and Technology departments.

At the rear of the college grounds is the Sports Hall, the centrepiece of which is a basketball court, renovated in recent years with a multi-purpose hardwood floor. A synthetic pitch, laid in 2006, is adjacent to the Sports Hall. For security reasons, the pitch is surrounded by high walls on three sides, separating the college grounds from the former Crumlin Road prison (now a tourist site) and the residential area on the site of the former Girdwood British Army barracks on Cliftonpark Avenue.

The college celebrated its 175th anniversary in April 2008 with a concert at the Waterfront Hall in Belfast. It also gathered the students and staff together in the college "Quad" area for a special photo which has not been taken in over 50 years for the college.

St. Joseph's Seminary, the seminary for the Diocese of Down and Connor, was situated on the same campus for over a century. This was officially known as the Diocesan Seminary at St Malachy's, and colloquially as "the wing" due to it being a wing of the college building. The Diocesan Seminary moved to Cliftonville Road during the Christmas holidays of 2012, and took the name St. Malachy's Diocesan Seminary, in recognition of the long-standing connection to the college, until its closure in 2018.

== Academic Record ==
The college has impressive records in both GCSE and A-level examinations, In 2018 it was ranked joint seventh in Northern Ireland for its GCSE performance with 99.4% of its entrants receiving five or more GCSEs at grades A* to C, including the core subjects English and Maths. 82.4% of its students who sat the A-level exams in 2017/18 were awarded three A*-C grades.

The college is also noted for having a strong music department and was designated as one of the first specialist music colleges in Northern Ireland and has built on this designation, developing a strong reputation for the arts and music and, more recently still, film/video production. The college is strong in mathematics and the primary sciences, with numerous alumni working in senior positions in prestigious national and international engineering and technology companies and research institutes.

The college has had many recent sporting successes, especially in athletics and basketball.

== Personnel ==
The current chairman of the board of governors for the college is Sir Gerry Loughran.

The current Principal is Deirdre McCusker who in 2025 became the first female College principal.

Her predecessors include Paul McBride (2014 - 2025), David Lambon (2011–2014) and Dr John Morrin (2001 - 2011), the very first lay leader of the College.

Before this all previous heads of the school held the title president and were ordained Catholic priests.

- Rector: Fr Michael Spence

== College presidents ==
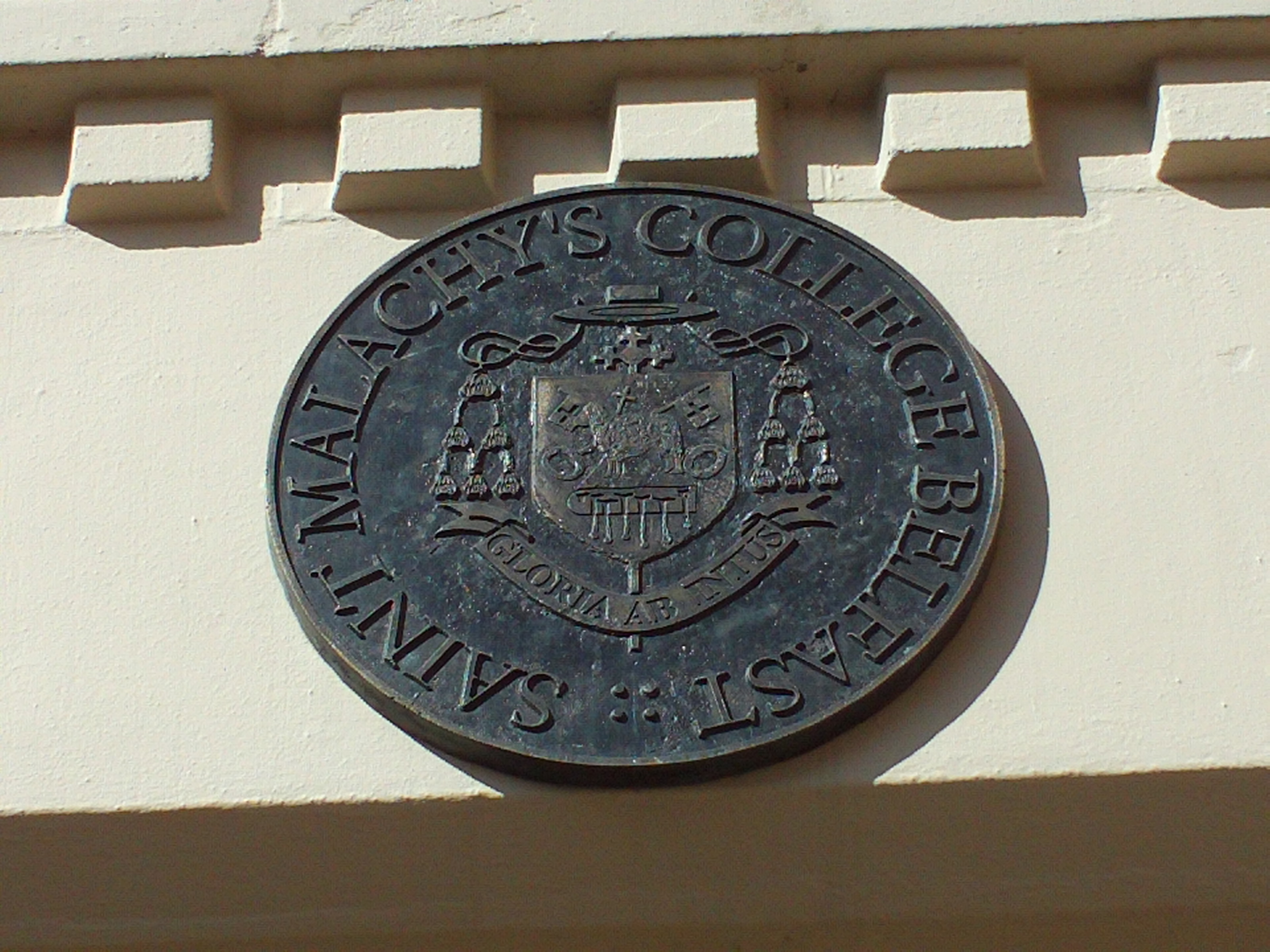
Plaque

Until the formal expansion of the mid-1860s, the superintending priest was known as 'The Dean', and it was only in 1866 that the title of president was formally adopted.

- 1866-1876: Richard Marner - former parish priest; uncle of Daniel Mageean, Bishop of Down and Connor 1929 – 1962
- 1876-1895: Henry Henry
- 1895-1898: Henry Boyle - later PP Bangor and, as Canon Boyle, PP Downpatrick (1916–1933)
- 1898-1905: Henry Laverty - Louvain-educated classicist
- 1905-1907: Patrick Boyle - later a canon, PP St. Teresa's Belfast, died 1955 aged 92
- 1907-1919: PJ O'Neill - died as PP Holy Rosary Ormeau Road 1921, brother of Canon Charles O'Neill who penned the lyrics to the Foggy Dew (Irish ballad).
- 1919-1924: Canon James Clenaghan
- 1924-1931: John McCaughan
- 1931-1939: James Hendley - president during centenary celebrations in 1933 (later vicar general, domestic prelate, dean of the chapter, PP St Pauls)
- 1940-1950: John McMullan.
- 1950-1960: Patrick Kerr - previously French and Latin master
- 1960-1970: Walter Larkin - previously dean of the seminary and mathematics master
- 1970-1983: Patrick Walsh - previously chaplain to Queen's University, Belfast
- 1983-1995: Noel Conway - previously head of physics
- 1995-2001: Donal McKeown - previously dean of the seminary and German teacher

== Notable alumni ==
Arts and media
- Michael McLaverty (1904–1992), novelist.
- Brian Moore (1921–1999), novelist.
- Proinsias Mac Cana (1928–2004), noted Celtic scholar and President of the Royal Irish Academy.
- Bernard MacLaverty (1942–), writer.
- Kevin Mallon, violinist and conductor.
- Denis Murray (1951–), journalist.
- Ciarán Hinds (1953–), film and stage actor.
- Sean Crummey (1957–2011), playwright, actor, comedian
- Eamonn Holmes (1959–), television presenter/personality
- Bill Neely (1959–), journalist.
- Brendan Foley (1964–), writer film, TV, books, former journalist.
- Tim McGarry (1964–), comedian and member of the Hole in the Wall Gang.
- Patrick O'Kane (1965-), actor
- Henry McDonald (1965–2023), journalist.
- Robert McLiam Wilson (1966–), novelist.

Law

- The Baron Russell of Killowen (1832–1900), 19th century Lord Chief Justice of England.
- Pat Finucane (1949–1989), solicitor.
- Barra McGrory (1959–), former Director of Public Prosecutions for Northern Ireland.
- Ronan Deazley, professor of law, Queen's University Belfast.

Politics

- Eoin MacNeill (1867–1945), Ceann Comhairle of Dáil Éireann and Irish Government Minister.
- John MacBride (1868–1916), Easter Rising participant.
- Joseph Connolly (1885–1961), Fianna Fáil senator and minister for Posts & Telegraphs, Lands & Fisheries.
- Seán MacEntee (1889–1984), Fianna Fáil TD and Tánaiste and minister for Finance, Health.
- Sir Oliver Napier (1935–2011), former Alliance Party of Northern Ireland leader.
- Seán Neeson (1946–2025), former leader of Alliance Party of Northern Ireland.
- Seamus Close (1947–2019), former Alliance politician.
- Alban Maginness (1950–), an SDLP politician, the first nationalist Lord Mayor of Belfast.
- Alex Maskey (1952–), first Sinn Féin Lord Mayor of Belfast, Speaker of the Northern Ireland Assembly.
- Pat Sheehan (1958–), participant in the 1981 Irish hunger strike.
- Alex Attwood (1959–), Social Democratic and Labour Party politician.
- Mal O'Hara (1979–), leader of Green Party Northern Ireland
- John Finucane (1980–), Lord Mayor of Belfast (2019-20), Sinn Féin politician.
- Thomas Stanislaus McAllister (1878–1950), Deputy Speaker of the Senate and first president of the Old Boys' Association

Religious

- Thomas Grimley (1821–1871), Bishop of Cape Town.
- Patrick MacAlister (1826–1895)
- Henry Henry (1846–1908)
- John Tohill (1855–1914)
- Vincent McNabb (1868–1943), London-based Irish scholar and priest, active in evangelisation and apologetics.
- Daniel Mageean (1882–1962)
- Cahal Cardinal Daly (1917–2009), Primate of All Ireland and Archbishop of Armagh
- Anthony Farquhar (1940–2023), Auxiliary Bishop of the Diocese of Down and Connor.

Science, medicine and engineering

- Sir Michael McBride, Chief Medical Officer for Northern Ireland since September 2006.
- Michael McElroy (scientist) (1939–2026), director, Harvard University Center for the Environment Harvard University.
- Stephen Myers (1946–), director of accelerators and technology at CERN, then head of CERN Medical Applications.

Sports

- Mike Bull (1946–), pole vault champion.
- Martin O'Neill (1952–), former Nottingham Forest footballer and Leicester City, Celtic and Aston Villa manager.
- Stephen Morrow (1970–), former Arsenal footballer.
- Michael Ingham (1980–), footballer.
- Kevin Seaward (1983–), Olympian marathon runner as part of the Ireland team at the 2016 Summer Olympics.
- Michael McKillop (1990–), Irish middle distance runner and Paralympic gold medallist.

== See also ==
- Malachians F.C.
- List of secondary schools in Belfast
