= Patrick Dorrian =

Irish Roman Catholic Prelate (1814–1885)

The Most Reverend Patrick Dorrian
- Bishop of Down and Connor
- Church: Catholic
- See: Diocese of Down and Connor
- In office: 1865–1885 (died)
- Predecessor: Cornelius Denvir
- Successor: Patrick MacAlister

Orders
- Ordination: 1837
- Consecration: 19 August 1860 by Joseph Dixon
- Rank: Bishop

Personal details
- Born: Downpatrick, County Down, Ireland
- Died: 3 November 1885 Belfast

Patrick Dorrian (1814–1885) was an Irish Roman Catholic Prelate and 23rd Lord Bishop of Down and Connor.

== Early life and education ==
Dorrian was born in Downpatrick on 29 March 1814, one of four sons of Patrick Dorrian and his wife Rose (née Murphy), and was educated first by a Unitarian minister in the classical school in the town, where he excelled, and then in St Patrick's College, Maynooth, where he was ordained in 1833.

== Priestly ministry ==
His first appointment was as a curate in the then developing town of Belfast, attached to St Patrick's Church, Belfast, where he ministered for ten years. At a relatively young age he was appointed parish priest in Loughinisland, (from 1847 to 1860) at which time he became Bishop of Gabala (Qabala) and Coadjutor Bishop of Down and Connor to assist the ailing, frail and irenic Bishop Cornelius Denvir.

== Episcopal ministry ==
Dorrian was consecrated bishop on 19 August 1860, in St Malachy's Church, Belfast, and eventually succeeded as bishop five years later on 4 May in 1865. Dorrian was known for his authoritarian style of leadership, referred to as "Cullenite". As the post-Famine population of Belfast grew, so too did sectarian attitudes, especially among those moving into the city from rural districts all over Ulster looking for work. Dorrian sought to defend Catholic interests, insisting on the necessity of separate Catholic education and seeking, where possible, to influence the social and political interests of his church.

In this respect historians Sean Connolly (academic) and Gillian McIntosh refer to Dorrian's "pugnacious" presiding over the rapid expansion in priests, churches and religious houses in contrast to the "scholarly but ineffective" Bishop Denvir.

It is estimated he was responsible for doubling the number of Catholic churches in the city of Belfast, and in 1866, early in his episcopate, St Peter's Cathedral, Belfast in Derby St in the Lower Falls area was first used as a pro-cathedral. His episcopal chair, placed in that church for the occasion, is still in use by the bishops of the Diocese of Down and Connor. He attended the First Vatican Council and was one of the leading Irish delegation to the event.

Dorrian died at the Episcopal Palace, Chichester Park, Belfast, on 3 November 1885, at 7 a.m., the Feast of Saint Malachy, Patron of the Diocese; his remains were interred within the chancel of St Patrick's Church, Belfast, on Friday 6 November.

At a meeting of the parish priests held in the chapel of the Diocesan College, 6 November 1885, immediately after the funeral of Dorrian, Patrick MacAlister was elected Vicar Capitular of Down and Connor. McAllister was then named by Pope Leo XIII as Dorrian's successor as the 24th Lord Bishop of Down and Connor.

In November 2017 the historic chapel of Belfast's Mater Infirmorum Hospital was re-opened after extensive refurbishment. It has, as a result of its connection with Dorrian, become known as the Dorrian Chapel.
