= John Tohill =

Catholic bishop

The Most Reverend John Tohill
- Roman Catholic Diocese of Down and Connor
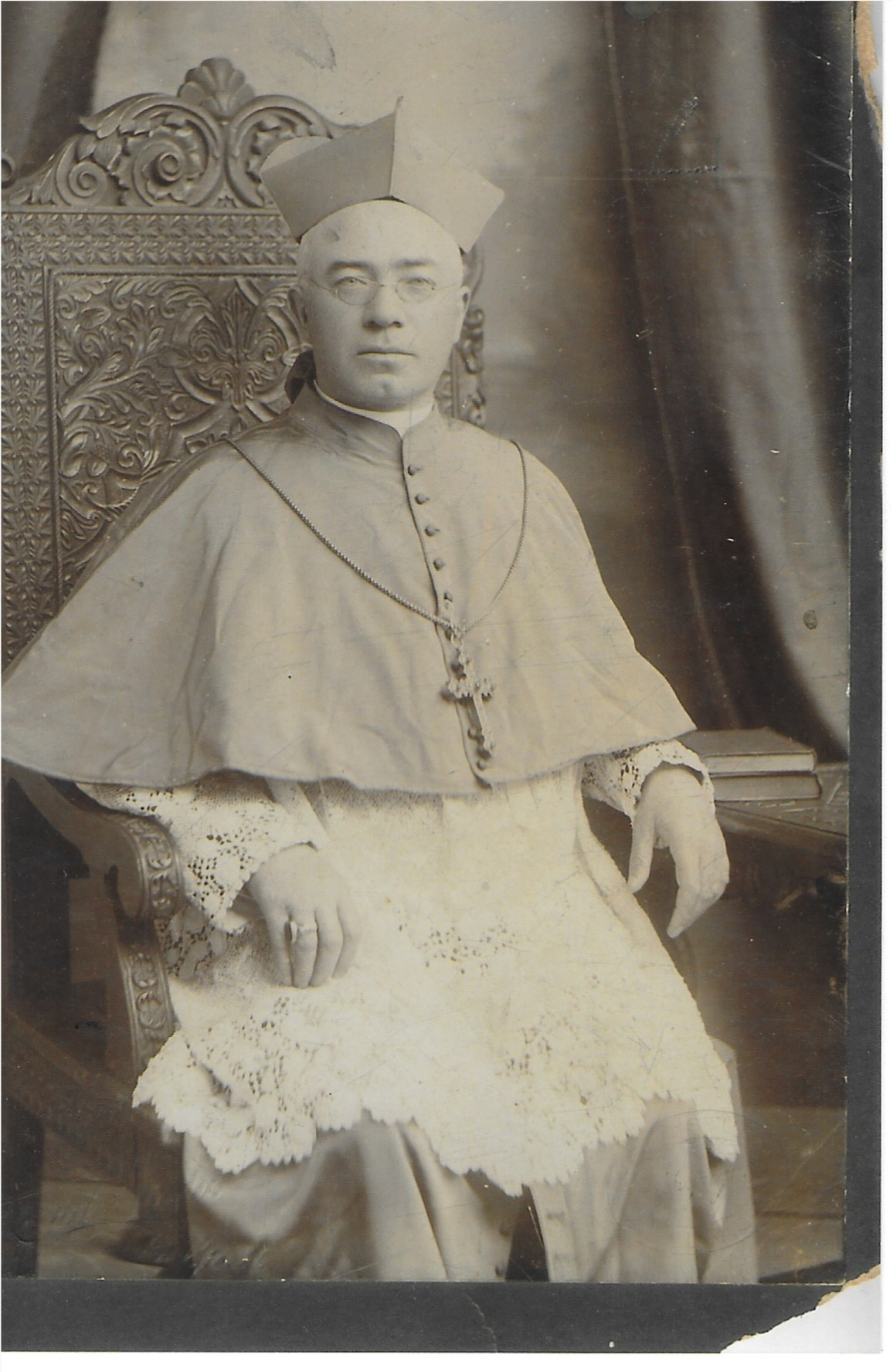
- Church: Catholic Church
- Diocese: Diocese of Down and Connor
- In office: 1908–1914; (died)
- Predecessor: Henry Henry
- Successor: Joseph MacRory
- Previous post: Parish Priest Cushendall

Orders
- Ordination: 22 Sept 1878
- Consecration: 20 Sept 1908 by Michael Logue

Personal details
- Born: 23 December 1855 Kilrea
- Died: 4 July 1914 Belfast, Ireland

Styles of John Tohill
- Reference style: The Most Reverend
- Spoken style: Your Lordship or Bishop
- Religious style: Bishop
- Posthumous style: not applicable

John Tohill (1855–1914) was an Irish Roman Catholic Prelate and 26th Lord Bishop of Down and Connor.

He was born in Gortmacrane County Londonderry, on 23 December 1855 to Anthony Tohill and Alice (née Convery) Tohill. He studied Classics at Tirgarvil School and then boarded at St. Malachy's College before entering Maynooth College on 21 September 1875.

== Priestly ministry ==
Tohill was recognised as a brilliant student at Maynooth coming first in every class. Patrick Dorrian (then Bishop of Down and Connor) recognised Tohill's scholarly ability and even before he was ordained priest he was appointed to the staff of Diocesan College in Belfast. He was ordained by Patrick Dorrian on 22 September 1878.

Tohill taught classics (mostly Greek) at the college until 1894 but always involved himself in the wider pastoral life of Belfast. An Irish Times obituary recalled that during the 1886 Belfast riots "Fr Tohill exercised his influence in the interests of peace." He gave evidence, along with several Catholic laymen, at a Select Committee in Westminster on what he had witnessed and police behaviour in 1886. Additionally he presented a list of Catholic businesses wrecked in Protestant districts, suggesting the attacks were far from random outbursts of sectarian violence but systematic in nature.

In 1894 Tohill was transferred to Holy Family Parish in North Belfast and then from 1898 to 1905 he was Administrator of St Peter's Cathedral, Belfast. He served as Parish Priest of Cushendall from 1905 to 1908.

== Bishop ==
Following the death of Henry Henry he was consecrated 26th Lord Bishop of Down and Connor on 20 September 1908 by Cardinal Michael Logue. One of his first tasks as bishop was to lay the foundation stone at Clonard Monastery which occurred on 4 October 1908.

In 1911 he visited his home district of Lavey, County Londonderry to administer the sacrament of confirmation to over 160 children, there having been no celebration of the sacrament in the preceding five years due to the illness of the Bishop of Derry.

He died after a year long illness in St. Malachy's College on 4 July 1914 and is buried in Milltown Cemetery, West Belfast. A London Times obituary claimed he had been appointed bishop because he had had no interest in politics and paid tribute to his "quiet, unassuming character."

He was succeeded by Joseph MacRory.
