= Noel Conway =

Noel Conway may refer to:

- Noel Conway (priest), Catholic priest of the Diocese of Down and Connor
- Noel Conway (Lecturer), Assisted dying advocate
