= James Clenaghan =

Rt. Rev. Mgr. Canon James P. Clenaghan, (Séamus Mac Leannacháin) P.P., V.G., St Malachy's Church, Belfast was a distinguished senior Irish churchman and educationalist whose entire ministry was in the Diocese of Down and Connor where he rose to become Vicar General.

== Early life and education ==
He was born on 28 May 1879 in the parish of Upper Ballinderry on the shores of Lough Neagh and was educated at St. Malachy's College Belfast and St Patrick's College Maynooth where he was ordained by William Walsh (archbishop of Dublin) on 19 June 1904.

An older brother, John Clenaghan, was also as priest but in the order of Oblates of Mary Immaculate while a younger brother George was also a priest of the Diocese of Down and Connor who, in addition to serving as a military chaplain during the First World War also served as parish priest of Loughguile Co. Antrim from 1939 - 1979.

== Ministry ==
He returned to the staff of his alma mater and was successively Dean and finally President of the College from 1919 - 1924. In the years following the Partition of Ireland and the subsequent upheaval in the new state of Northern Ireland, Clenaghan faced a trying time in keeping the College open and solvent.

In 1924, he became P.P. of Carnlough and ten years later was moved back to Belfast as P.P. of St Malachy's Church, Belfast. He was appointed Vicar General by his near contemporary Bishop Daniel Mageean in October 1936 and made a Canon of the Cathedral chapter.

He died aged 61 on 26 November 1940 at his brother William’s residence, "Rosario", in Magheragall. He was fondly remembered in a history of his native parish written soon after "He contributed valuable articles to the educational and ecclesiastical journals and was a popular lecturer on aspects of Irish Catholic life.

He was a fluent Irish speaker and one of the founder members of the Irish-speaking Priests' Society, Cumann na Sagart Gaelach."
