= The Irish News =

Northern Irish newspaper

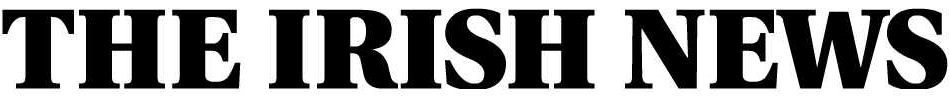

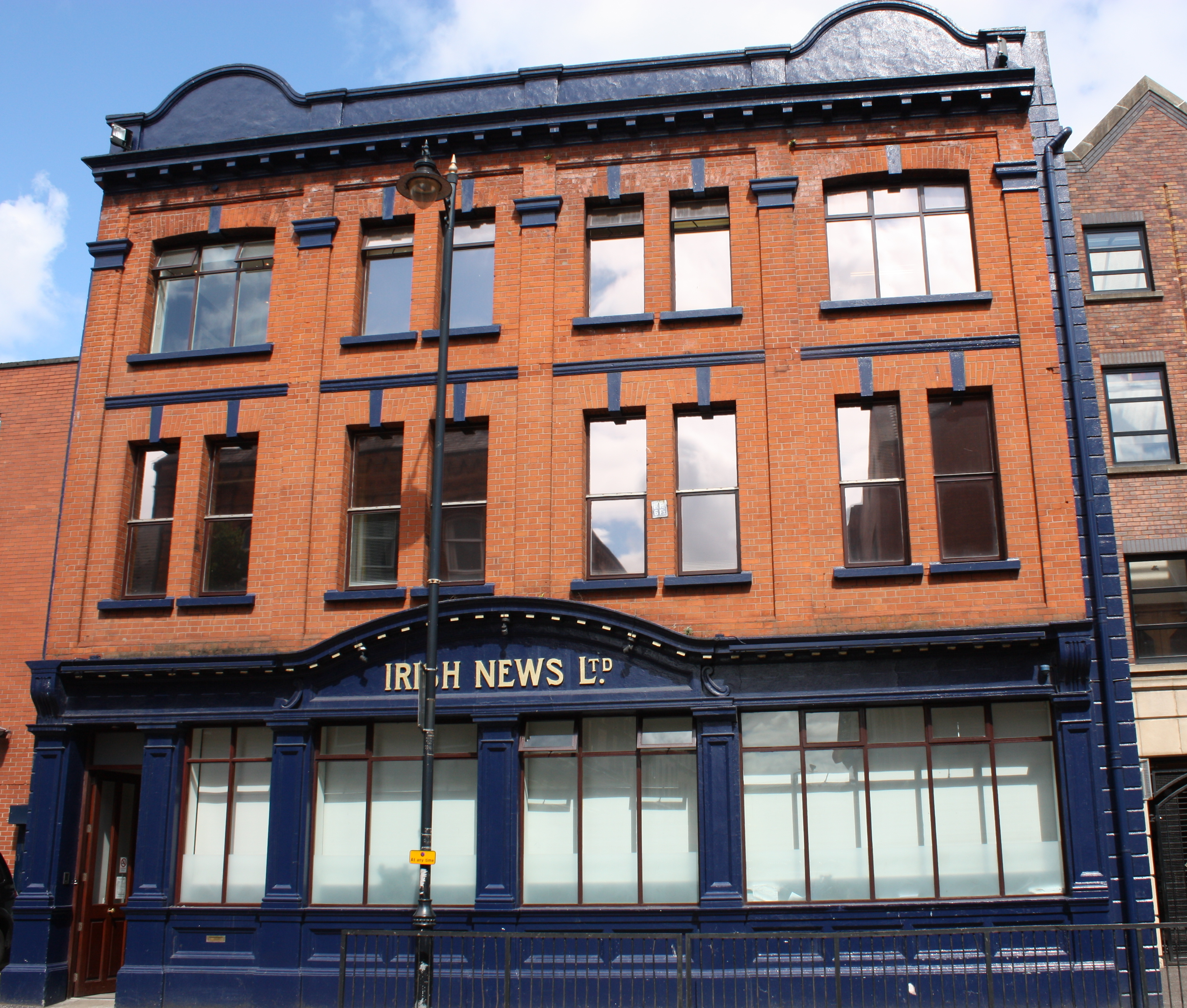
- The Irish News, 23 February 2007
- Type: Daily newspaper
- Format: Originally Broadsheet, then Berliner but Compact since 2005
- Owner: Fitzpatrick family
- Founder: Bishop Patrick MacAlister
- Publisher: The Irish News Ltd
- Editor: Chris Sherrard
- Founded: 15 August 1891
- Language: English, Irish
- Headquarters: Fountain Centre, College Street; Belfast, Northern Ireland
- Circulation: 20,857 (as of August 2025)
- Website: www.irishnews.com

The Irish News is a compact daily newspaper based in Belfast, Northern Ireland. It is Northern Ireland's largest-selling morning newspaper and is available throughout Ireland. It is broadly Irish nationalist in its viewpoint, though it also features unionist columnists.

== History ==
The Irish News is the only independently owned daily newspaper based in Northern Ireland, and has been so since its launch on 15 August 1891 as an anti-Parnell newspaper by Patrick MacAlister. It merged with the Belfast Morning News in August 1892, and the full title of the paper has since been The Irish News and Belfast Morning News. T.P. Campbell was editor from 1895 until 1906, when he was succeeded by Tim McCarthy, who served as editor until 1928. Tom Collins was editor from 1993 to 1999. Appointed in 1999, Noel Doran served as editor until 2024 when he was succeeded by Chris Sherrard.

The Irish News saw a dramatic growth in its circulation with the beginning of The Troubles in 1969; this peaked around the time of the peak in violence in 1971, and declined thereafter.

In June 1982, the paper came under the control of the company's present owners, with Martin O'Brien as Editor.

In May 2023, the newspaper relocated from its premises at 113-117 Donegall Street, its home for more than a century, to modern offices on College Street. The Irish News's departure from Donegall Street marks the end of the street's association with print journalism, which earned it the nickname of Belfast's Fleet Street. The Donegall Street building was sold to Ulster University.

In September 2023, the newspaper got its first new look since March 2005.

== Circulation ==
Year (period)	Average circulation per issue
2002 (June to December)	52,066
2007 (January to June)	48,613
2008 (January to June)	47,911
2011 (July to December)	41,932
2013 (January to June)	40,842
2017 (July to December)	34,082
2018 (July to December)	32,315
2024 (January to June)	21,181

== See also ==
- Category:The Irish News people
