= Belfast Morning News =

19th-century Irish newspaper

- Type: Daily newspaper
- Format: Broadsheet
- Owner: Family of Edmund Dwyer Gray
- Editor: P.J. Kelly; Robert Arthur Wilson (1874–1875)
- Founded: 1855
- Ceased publication: August 1892
- Language: English
- Headquarters: Belfast, Ireland

The Belfast Morning News (from 1882 the Morning News and, for a brief period (1882–83) the Morning News and Examiner) was a daily newspaper in Ireland from 1855 until it merged with the Irish News in August 1892. It was published in Belfast. It was owned by the family of Edmund Dwyer Gray and edited by P.J. Kelly. The writer and advocate for workers' rights Robert Arthur Wilson wrote for the paper under the pen name Barney McGlone. Wilson edited the paper from 1874 until his death in 1875. Digitised copies of the Belfast Morning News, dating back to 1857, are available to search and view at the British Newspaper Archive.
