= The Folks on the Hill =

- Country of origin: Northern Ireland

Production
- Running time: 15 mins

Original release
- Network: from 2001 on BBC Radio Ulster; from 2004 BBC One (Northern Ireland)

The Folks on the Hill is a satirical sketch show, which started in January 2001 as a Saturday morning BBC Radio Ulster broadcast. In 2004, it evolved into an animated television show, first aired on 9 January 2004, on BBC One Northern Ireland. In its 10th year, the final, 17th series was broadcast on BBC Radio Ulster from Saturday 8 October until 12 November 2011, the day before writer and voice-over star Sean Crummey died.

The show is a light-hearted, comic parody of the prominent figures of Northern Irish politics, and occasionally other politicians including Tony Blair, Gordon Brown, Bertie Ahern and George W. Bush. The term 'folks on the hill' refers to the Northern Irish parliament and government at Stormont Hill.

The programme was written by Belfast impressionist, Sean Crummey, animated by Liam O'Neill (later Ciaran Boyle) and produced by Owen McFadden. The music was by Paul Rocks. Female voice impersonations were by Kathy Clugston, who provided the voices for Anne Robinson, Iris Robinson, Camilla, the Queen, Bairbre de Brun and many others.

== Musical Reference ==
"The Folks Who Live On the Hill" (1937) is a ballad written by Oscar Hammerstein II and Jerome Kern. (Note that unlike the show, there is no "the" before "folks" in the song title.) For more information see Darby and Joan.
