= Sean Crummey =

Seán Crummey
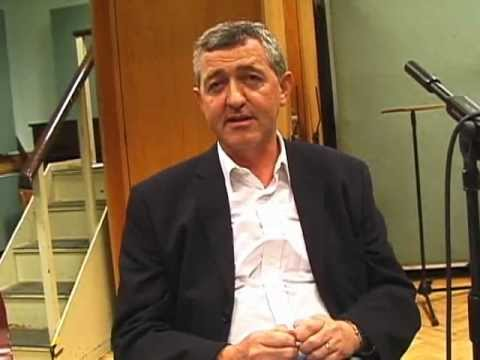
- Born: 1957
- Died: 13 November 2011 (aged 53–54)
- Notable work: The Folks on the Hill (radio and television series); Stormont (stage play)
- Spouse: Gabrielle Maguire
- Children: Conor Crummey, Niamh Crummey, Brendan Crummey

Comedy career
- Years active: 1990s–2011
- Genres: Impressions, sketch comedy actor, writer

Seán Crummey (1957 – 13 November 2011) was a Belfast playwright, actor and comic impressionist who is most notable as both the writer and the male voice-over star of The Folks on the Hill, a hugely successful, popular programme that started in 2001 and ran for over 10 years with a total of seventeen radio and animated television series. The show is considered by many to be one of BBC NI's most successful programmes due to its longevity and popularity.

== Biography ==
Crummey was born and grew up in the Glen Road district of West Belfast. He attended St. Kevin's Primary School and then St Malachy's College before proceeding to Queen's University Belfast from which he graduated in 1980 with a BA in French and Classical Greek. He taught French language for seventeen years at De La Salle College, Belfast.

== Comic career ==
He worked the after-dinner comic entertainment circuit for many years, and he felt that his language background contributed to his voice-over impressions. During the Troubles, comedians needed to adopt a non-partisan stance, so his stage name was a neutral-sounding non-Catholic pseudonym.

Seán Crummey was well known for his hilariously accurate depictions and his gentle, humorous political satire. He impersonated dozens of voices, particularly of Northern Ireland politicians. Some of Crummey's favourite voices to impersonate were the late PUP leader David Ervine, Pope John Paul II, and Bill McLaren.

He also wrote and starred in Stormont, a stage play produced by Martin Lynch and directed by Michael Poynor, that ran at the Theatre at the Mill in Newtownabbey mid-September to early October 2010 selling out many nights of the show's run. On stage, Crummey alternately mimicked two politicians, Ulster Unionist Michael McGimpsey and Sinn Féin's Gerry Kelly.

He died from a cancer-related illness just a day after his final show was broadcast. Politicians from across the political spectrum gave tribute to his comic work and political commentary, and his funeral was attended by thousands.

A tribute show was broadcast on New Year's Day, 2012. A memorial fund set up in memory of Seán Crummey donated £60,000 to Queen's Centre for Cancer Research and Cell Biology (CCRCB).
