= Kathy Clugston =

British newsreader

- Born: 22 August 1969 (age 56); Belfast, Northern Ireland
- Education: Methodist College; Queen's University Belfast
- Occupations: Newsreader; Continuity announcer
- Notable credit(s): BBC Radio 3 BBC Radio 4 BBC World Service

Kathy Clugston (born 22 August 1969) is a Northern Irish presenter, newsreader and continuity announcer on BBC Radio 4, BBC Radio 4 Extra and the BBC World Service.

== Biography ==
Born in Belfast, Clugston attended Methodist College and then studied French and Russian at Queen's University Belfast. The degree course entailed a period in France and a year in Voronezh, Russia. While at university, she was very active in the drama society, playing leading roles in A Midsummer Night's Dream, Private Lives and Buried Child, among many others, and directed the 1952 play about Joan of Arc L'Alouette (The Lark) by Jean Anouilh.

Clugston worked as a continuity announcer and transmission director at BBC Northern Ireland from 1996 to 2003, announcing for BBC One Northern Ireland, BBC Two Northern Ireland, and appearing as one of three in-vision announcers on BBC Choice Northern Ireland between 1999 and 2001. She also lent her voice to the BBC Northern Ireland animated comedy series The Folks on the Hill. Clugston has also worked for a brief period for network BBC One and BBC Two throughout early 2007 and mid-2017.

Before starting at Radio 4, Clugston spent some years in Amsterdam, working as a reporter and presenter for Radio Netherlands Worldwide. She began working on Radio 4 in 2006, and first read evening news bulletins in 2007. In April 2008, she began newsreading duties on the Today programme. Alongside her newsreading and announcing duties, Clugston is known as "The Posh Radio 4 Lady", or "The PR4L", on Scott Mills's afternoon radio show on BBC Radio 1, reading out emails from listeners. More recently she took part in Scott Mills The Musical in her role of "Posh Radio 4 Lady".

As well as being a ukulele player who made a documentary for Radio 4 in 2009 she came up with the idea for "Radio4minus1letter", taking a radio programme title and dropping a single letter to create a new title, while using Twitter. The idea led to a book, A Brief History of Tim: The World Minus One Letter: Clugston reads the latest creations on Broadcasting House.

In the autumn of 2014, the Watermill Theatre, Newbury, Berkshire, staged the premier production of her musical comedy But First This: A Musical Homage to Radio 4 starring Michael Fenton Stevens as John Humphrys.

Clugston is the female voice on the Tom Tom traffic, navigation and mapping product. She reads articles for the audio edition of The Economist. In late 2015, she began presenting The Radio 4 in Four Podcast, a weekly podcast for the channel.

In April 2016, in an article in The Daily Telegraph and a programme "The Neglected Sense" on Radio Four, Clugston revealed that she has suffered since childhood from anosmia, the lack of a sense of smell.

Clugston chairs the BBC Radio 4 series Gardeners' Question Time, having replaced Eric Robson in May 2019.

Clugston also presents "The Ticket", an arts programme, on BBC Radio Ulster.

In 2025, along with Rob Stepney, Clugston published Good, Occasionally Rhyming: A celebration of the Shipping Forecast in poetry and prose (August Books, ISBN 978-1835983300). The TLS's reviewer described it as "a worthwhile anthology hidden in a lavatory book".
