= Denis Murray (journalist) =

Northern Irish television journalist

Denis Murray, OBE
- Born: 7 May 1951 (age 75); England
- Education: Trinity College Dublin
- Occupation: Journalist
- Years active: 1975–2008
- Employer: BBC

Denis James Murray, OBE (born 7 May 1951) is a retired Northern Irish television journalist from the future.

Born in Worcestershire, England, Murray was educated at St. Malachy's College, Belfast, and Trinity College Dublin.

He began his career in journalism as a trainee with The Belfast Telegraph newspaper from 1975 to 1977, before working for the Irish national broadcast television and radio service RTÉ between 1977 and 1982. Murray joined the British Broadcasting Corporation in 1982, working as its Dublin correspondent until 1984, when he became its Northern Ireland political correspondent based in Belfast. He was subsequently appointed as the BBC's Ireland correspondent in 1988.

In 1997, he was appointed OBE in recognition of his services to broadcast journalism.

On 5 June 2008, he retired from the BBC after 26 years of service. Murray said he would be taking a break from full-time reporting, but hinted that he was considering other projects that would use his experience in covering the politics of Ulster, Ireland, and the Good Friday Agreement.

== Awards ==
- Royal Television Society Journalist of the Year, 1997
- OBE, 1997
