= William Crolly =

Roman Catholic Archbishop of Armagh

The Most Reverend William Crolly DD
- Archbishop of Armagh; Primate of All Ireland
- Archdiocese: Armagh
- Installed: 1835
- Term ended: 1849 (died)
- Predecessor: Thomas Kelly
- Successor: Paul Cullen

Orders
- Ordination: 1806 (Priest)
- Consecration: 22 February 1825 (Bishop) Down and Connor

Personal details
- Born: 8 June 1780 Ballykilbeg, County Down, Ireland
- Died: 6 April 1849 (aged 68) Drogheda, Ireland
- Buried: St. Patrick's Cathedral, Armagh
- Denomination: Roman Catholic Church
- Education: St Patrick's College, Maynooth

Styles of William Crolly
- Reference style: The Most Reverend
- Spoken style: Your Grace or Archbishop

William Crolly (8 June 1780 – 8 April 1849) was the Bishop of Down and Connor from 1825 to 1835, and the Roman Catholic Archbishop of Armagh from 1835 to 1849.

== Early life and education ==
A native of Ballykilbeg near Downpatrick, Crolly was born on 8 June 1780 and like his successors as Bishop of Down and Connor, Cornelius Denvir and Patrick Dorrian, was educated at Mr. Nelson's Classical school in Downpatrick. At the age of 18 he witnessed the upheaval and aftermath of the 1798 United Irishmen rising at the county jail in Downpatrick, where it is believed that one of the assistant schoolmasters was imprisoned.

Crolly went to Maynooth College where he excelled as a student, obtaining a first in Dogmatic Theology in 1806, the same year he was ordained a priest by Archbishop Troy.

Crolly was in demand as a lecturer at Maynooth and spent several years on the academic staff, but in 1812 moved to St Patrick's Church, Belfast. He preached at the opening of the original church on 5 March 1815 in a ceremony presided over by Bishop Patrick MacMullan whom he would eventually succeed.

== Bishop of Down and Connor ==
In Feb 1825 Crolly was appointed Bishop of Down and Connor and received episcopal ordination in St. Patrick's Church, Donegall St, the first time a Catholic bishop had ever been ordained in Belfast.

Crolly spent a decade ministering in his native diocese and among the most important and enduring aspects of his episcopate was the establishment of St. Malachy's College in 1833, although he also oversaw the construction of many churches in rural parishes.

One writer estimates this was only possible by Crolly living with his curates in a single house in Belfast.

== Archbishop of Armagh ==
In 1835 Crolly was appointed Archbishop of Armagh in succession to Thomas Kelly who has served under three years in office. He began the construction of St Patrick's Cathedral, Armagh (Roman Catholic) laying the foundation stone on St Patrick's Day, 1840. He appointed Thomas Duff architect and also decreed that work be suspended because of the Great Irish Famine.

His support for non-denominational education and his cautious welcome of the Queen's College's in 1845 (see Queen's University of Ireland ), a position at variance with most other Irish bishops of the time, led to him being remembered at his death as a "thoroughly tolerant man ... who devoted himself heart and soul to the advancement of his church".

The issue of these new third-level institutions created the most bitter division among the Irish bishops. Crolly in Armagh and Archbishop Murray in Dublin were prepared to accept relatively minor adjustments to the academic colleges bill (1845), "from which the teaching of theology was excluded, and which left responsibility for the religious welfare of the students to each denomination." This more moderate approach was opposed by the pugnacious Archbishop John MacHale and a majority of bishops who wanted Rome to condemn the colleges. They held the initiative to be ‘godless’ and that they " would be destructive of the faith of catholic youth".

Rome eventually ordered Irish Catholic bishops to take no part in establishing the colleges, a defeat for Crolly and his liberal sensibilities.

Crolly founded St Patrick's College, Armagh in 1838 to provide education for young men in his diocese. At first it was staffed by diocesan priests until it was taken over by the Vincentian Order / Congregation of the Mission in 1861.

== Death ==
He died of cholera in Drogheda, County Louth, in April 1849. An obituary notice in The Spectator noting the suddenness of his death recorded that 'his amiable qualities, his charitable bearing, and his moderate and conciliatory political course, secured him universal esteem, and will cause his death to be universally mourned in Ireland.'

His birthplace in Ballykilbeg, County Down, is remembered on a blue plaque.

== Sources ==
- "Crolly, William" . Dictionary of National Biography. London: Smith, Elder & Co. 1885–1900.

Catholic Church titles
| Preceded by Patrick MacMullan | Bishop of Down and Connor; 1825–1835 | Succeeded by Patrick MacMullan |
| Preceded by Thomas Kelly | Archbishop of Armagh and Primate of All Ireland; 1835–1849 | Succeeded by Paul Cullen |
