= St Malachy's Church, Belfast =

Church in Belfast, County Antrim, Northern Ireland

Coordinates: 54°35′39″N 5°55′36″W

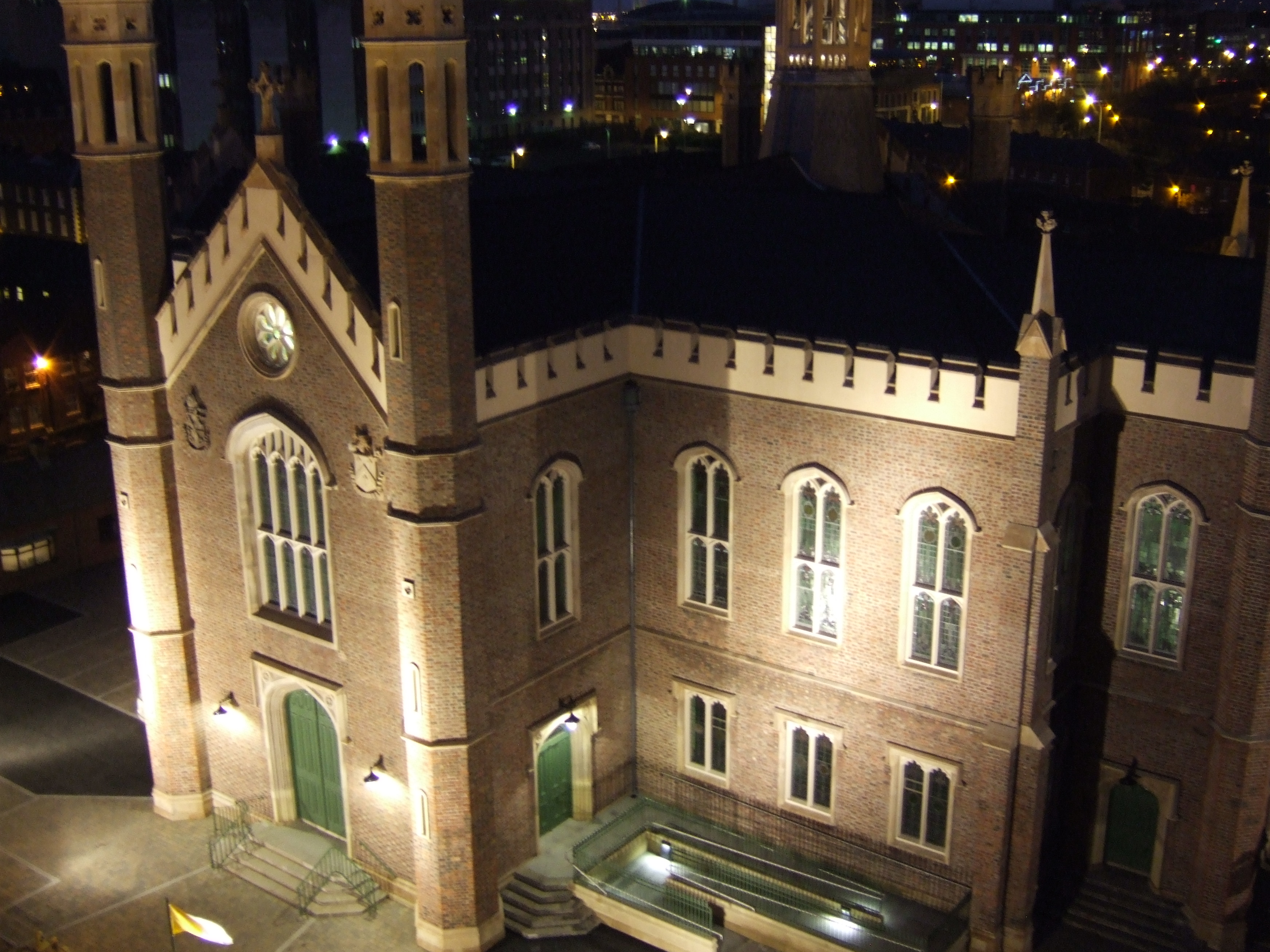
The church at night

Saint Malachy's Church is a Catholic church in Belfast, Northern Ireland. It is located in Alfred Street, a short distance from Belfast City Hall, although it precedes that building by over 60 years. The church is the focal point of the local parish community, also Saint Malachy's, one of the 88 parishes in the Diocese of Down and Connor. It is second oldest Catholic church in the city of Belfast continuously in use. St Mary's is the oldest: both St Mary's Church, Belfast and St Patrick's Church, Belfast having been substantially or totally rebuilt.

In the beginning Saint Malachy's was served by priests from St Mary's Church, Belfast, until the Parish of Saint Malachy was created in 1866 and Fr Geoffrey Brennan, a native of Kilkenny, was appointed administrator. The first parish priest of Saint Malachy's, a post created in 1909, was Fr Daniel McCashin.

== History ==
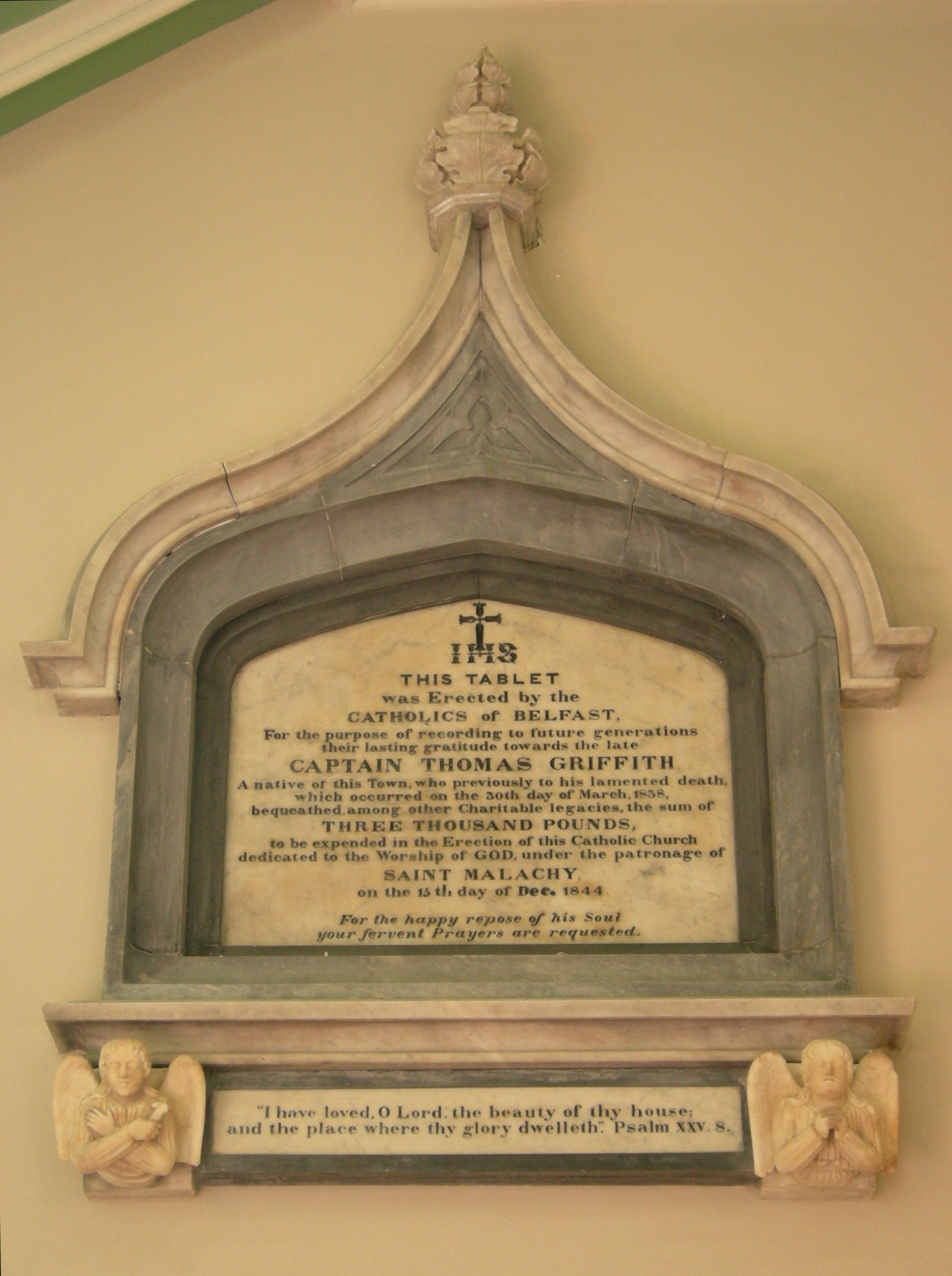
The monument to Captain Griffith and commemoration of the opening of Saint Malachy's in December 1844

The Bishop of Down and Connor Dr Cornelius Denvir had for a long period during the 1830s sought an appropriate location for a third church to provide increased sacramental support for the burgeoning Catholic population.

Mr Adam McClean, a Protestant merchant and owner of the large expanse of property behind Donegall Square South known as 'McClean's Fields', offered the Bishop a site on attractive terms. A lease was signed on 1 May 1839, whereby Adam McClean leased to Mr Hugh Magill (a prominent linen merchant) in trust for the Catholics of Belfast the parcel of building ground fronting Alfred St. The site actually consisted of three plots, Dr Denvir having previously negotiated purchase of a small block, and a block gifted by Mr McClean.

On 3 November 1841, the feast of Saint Malachy, the foundation stone for Saint Malachy's Church was laid. On 15 December 1844 Dr William Crolly, Archbishop of Armagh and Primate of All Ireland, dedicated the building. Dr Crolly was a native and former bishop of the Diocese of Down and Connor. Originally - and briefly - Saint Malachy's was intended to be the cathedral church of the Diocese of Down and Connor: however, due to financial difficulties, a smaller building was constructed. Consequently, the church is regarded as one of the finest examples of Tudor Revival churches in Ireland.

== Interior ==
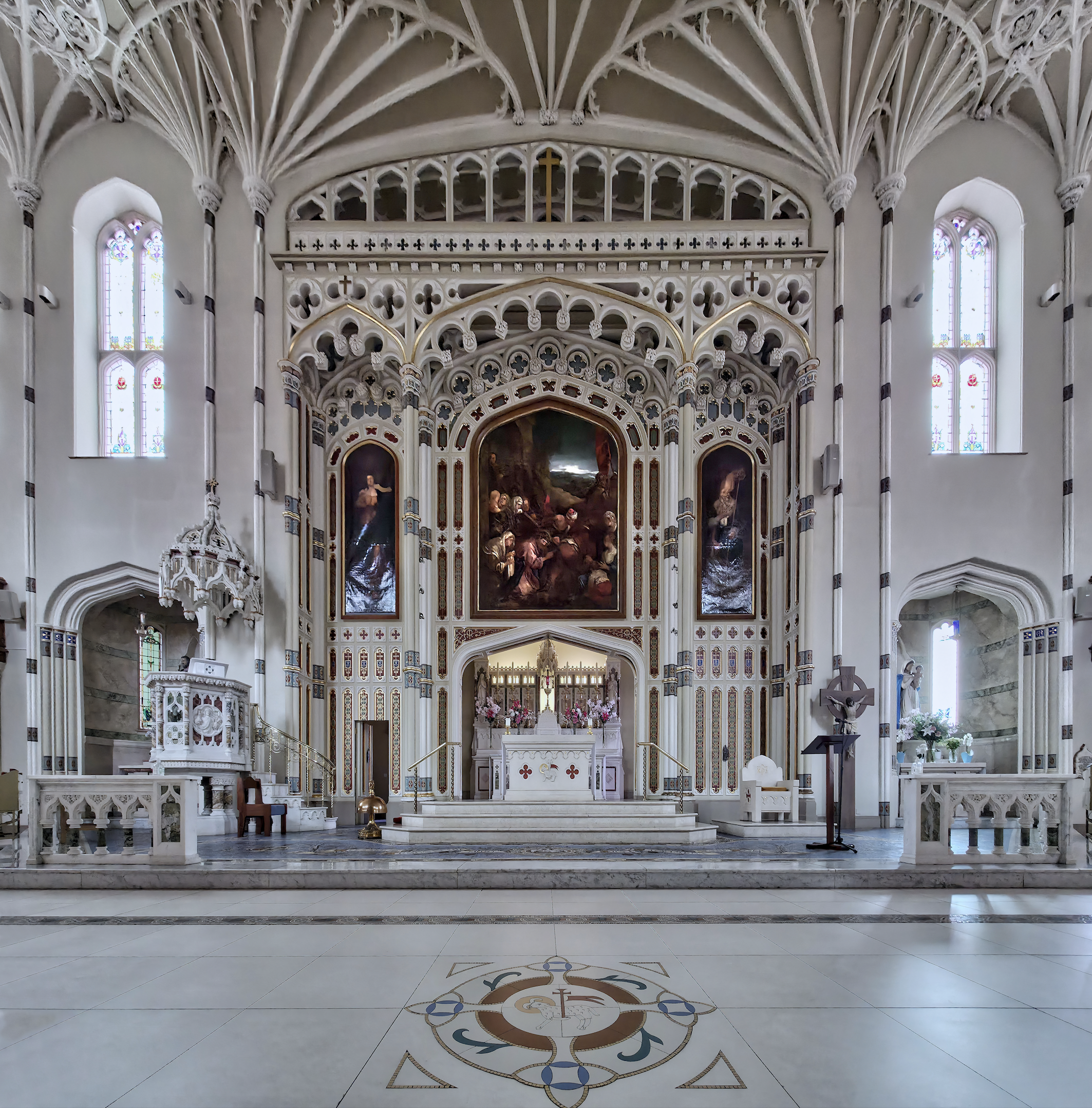
The sanctuary

The church was designed by Thomas Jackson of Waterford, and it is in the ecclesiastical style of the Tudor period. the builder responsible for the interior was Peter Lundy whose offices were nearby in 11 Joy St.

It is cruciform in shape, 113 feet long, 52 feet wide and 40 feet high. The original high altar, pulpit and altar rails were of Irish oak; however, they were replaced with marble when the church was renovated in 1926 under the designs of Padraic Gregory. All that remains of the original ornaments is the canopy over the pulpit which has been painted white to match the marble of the present altar furnishings. The sanctuary floor is mosaic, dating from the 1926 refurbishment, the principal colour being blue. At the foot of the altar is a pelican, a common Christian symbol of sacrifice. This work is recorded as being from the studio of Ludwig Oppenheimer in Manchester.

Saint Malachy's is, perhaps, best known for its fan vaulted ceiling which is an imitation of the Henry VII Chapel in Westminster Abbey. Sir Charles Brett stated: It is as though a wedding cake has been turned inside out, so creamy, lacy and frothy is the plasterwork. There are two side altars in the church, on either side of the sanctuary. One is dedicated to Saint Joseph, the other to the Blessed Virgin Mary. The church also has statues of the Sacred Heart of Jesus, Saint Francis of Assisi, Saint Anthony of Padua, Saint Thérèse of Lisieux, Saint Philomena, Saint Malachy himself, and Saint Benedict Joseph Labre, known as "The Ragged Saint" by the people of Belfast and throughout Ireland.

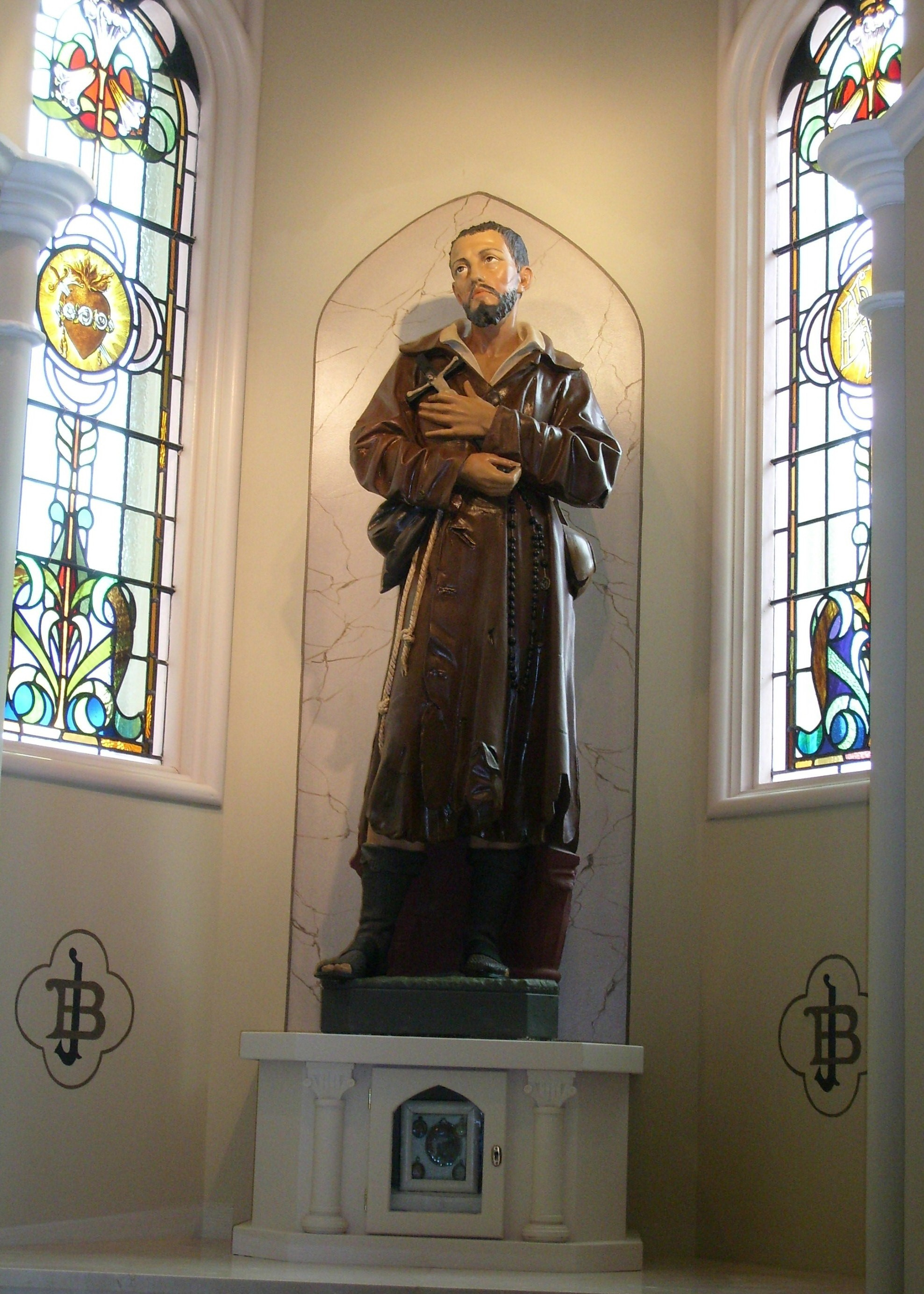
The Ragged Saint – The Shrine of Saint Benedict Joseph Labre

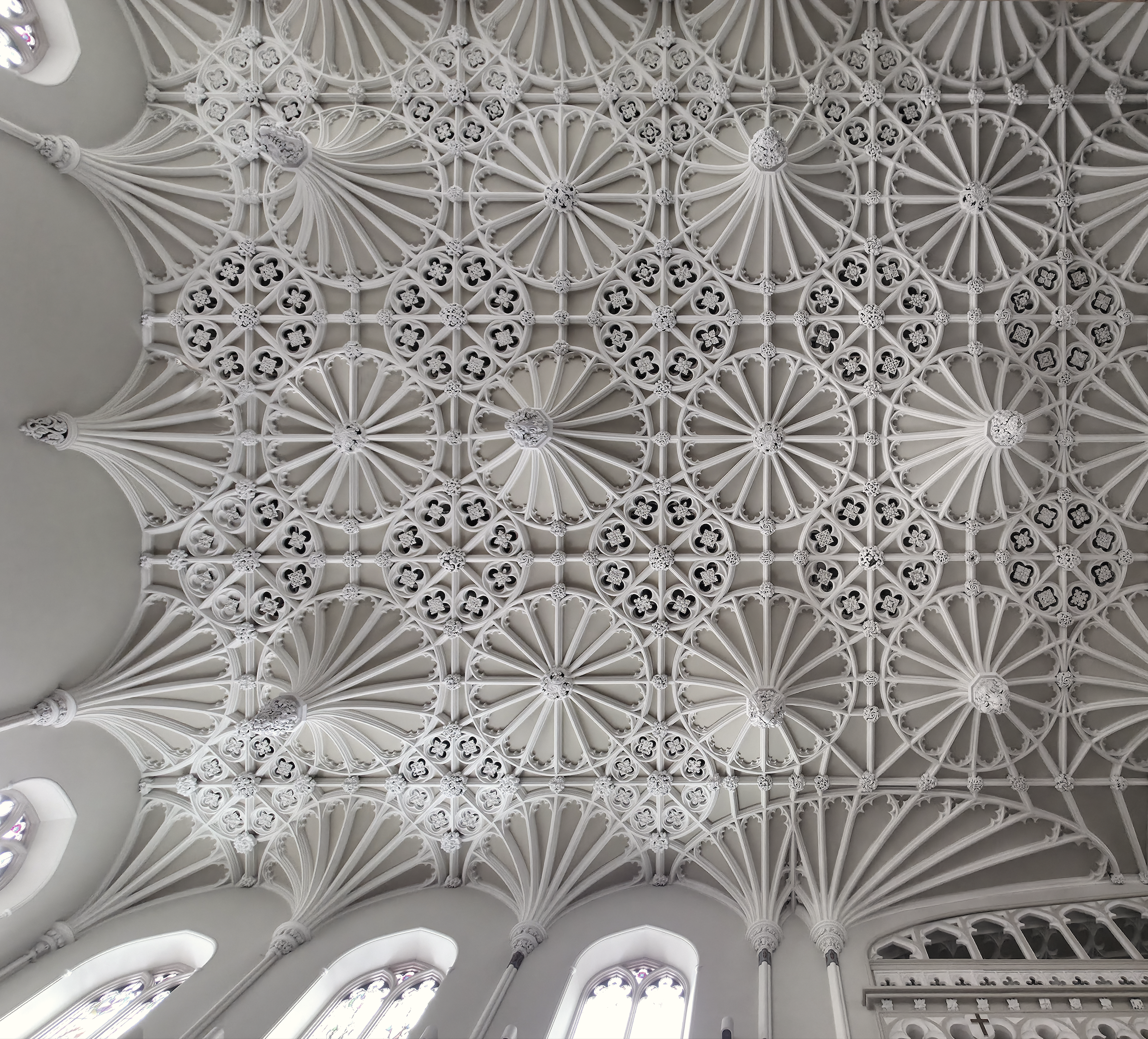
St Malachy's fan-vaulted ceiling

== World War II ==
During the Second World War there were a number of raids on Belfast by the Luftwaffe, the German Air Force. On one occasion, during the infamous Belfast Blitz of Easter Tuesday, 15 April 1941, a bomb landed in front of the church and, while it did not cause any structural damage to the church, many of the windows were blown in. A second bomb landed at the nearby Gasworks. The explosion caused a huge vacuum in the local area which literally sucked out the remainder of the windows and the original Irish oak frames were destroyed.

Being a time of war, it was impossible to replace the oak window frames and so they were replaced in concrete, something that was to prove more damaging than the German bombs. Over 60 years the strength of the concrete destroyed the bricks surrounding these frames (the church was built with handmade bricks) and by the time the restoration work was complete upwards of 80,000 bricks needed to be replaced. While the church suffered a great deal of damage during the War it was still kept open by doing the work in stages, sometimes with half the building closed off.

== Restoration ==
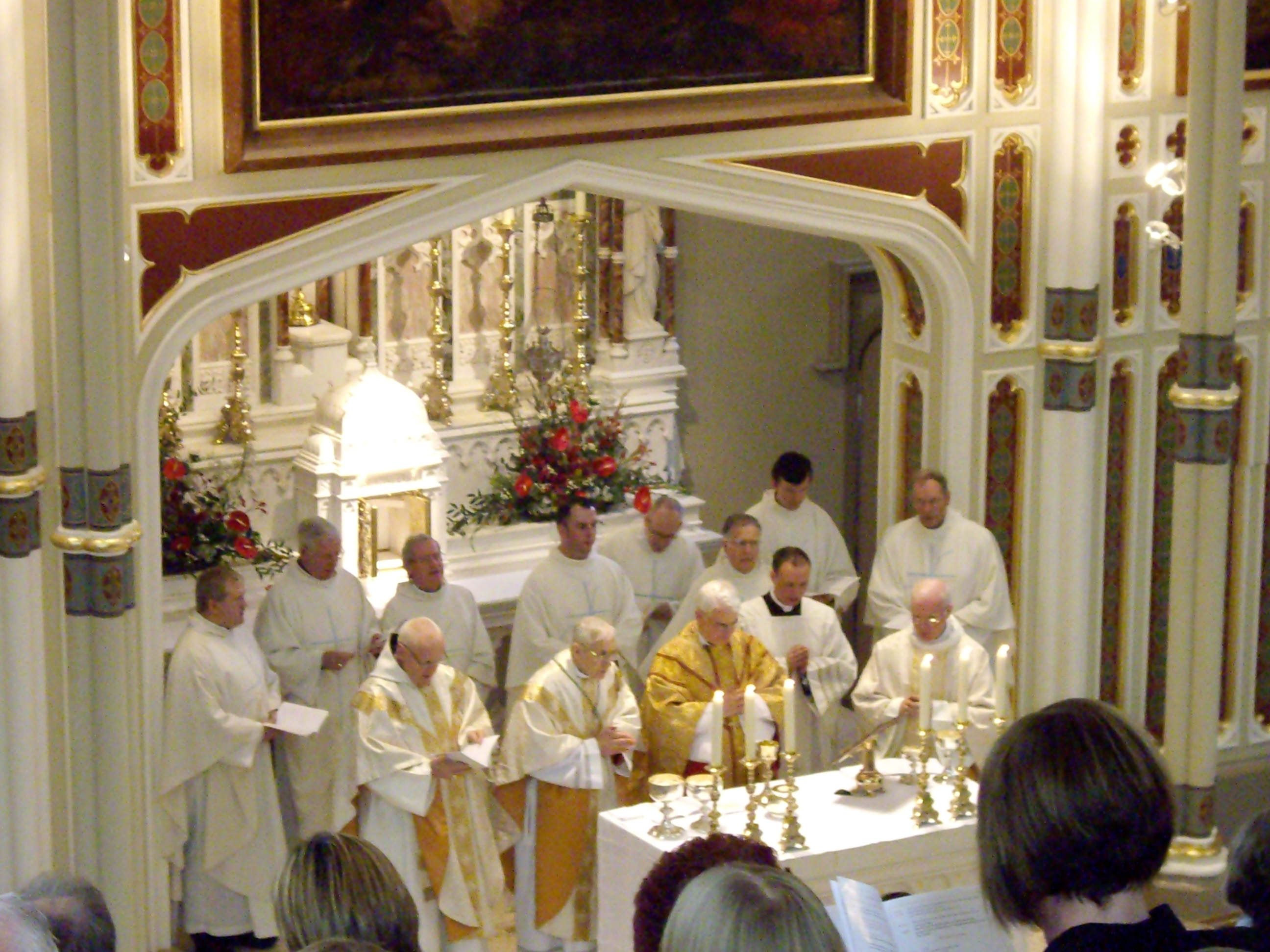
Dr Noel Treanor, Bishop of Down and Connor, celebrates Mass on the newly dedicated altar

The area of the city around Saint Malachy's was dramatically re-developed from the early 1980s. That period of urban planning, and the age of the church itself, led to a deterioration in the condition of the brickwork meaning a full-scale restoration programme which began in January 2008 and was completed in 2009 at a cost of £3,500,000. The interior of the church was also restored.

The ornate stencilling around the sanctuary, painted over in the 1950s, was restored as were the altar rails and the intricate mosaic floor. The Solemn Re-Opening and Dedication of the altar was celebrated on 29 March 2009 by the Bishop of Down and Connor, Dr Noel Treanor, in the presence of the Bishop Emeritus Dr Patrick Walsh.

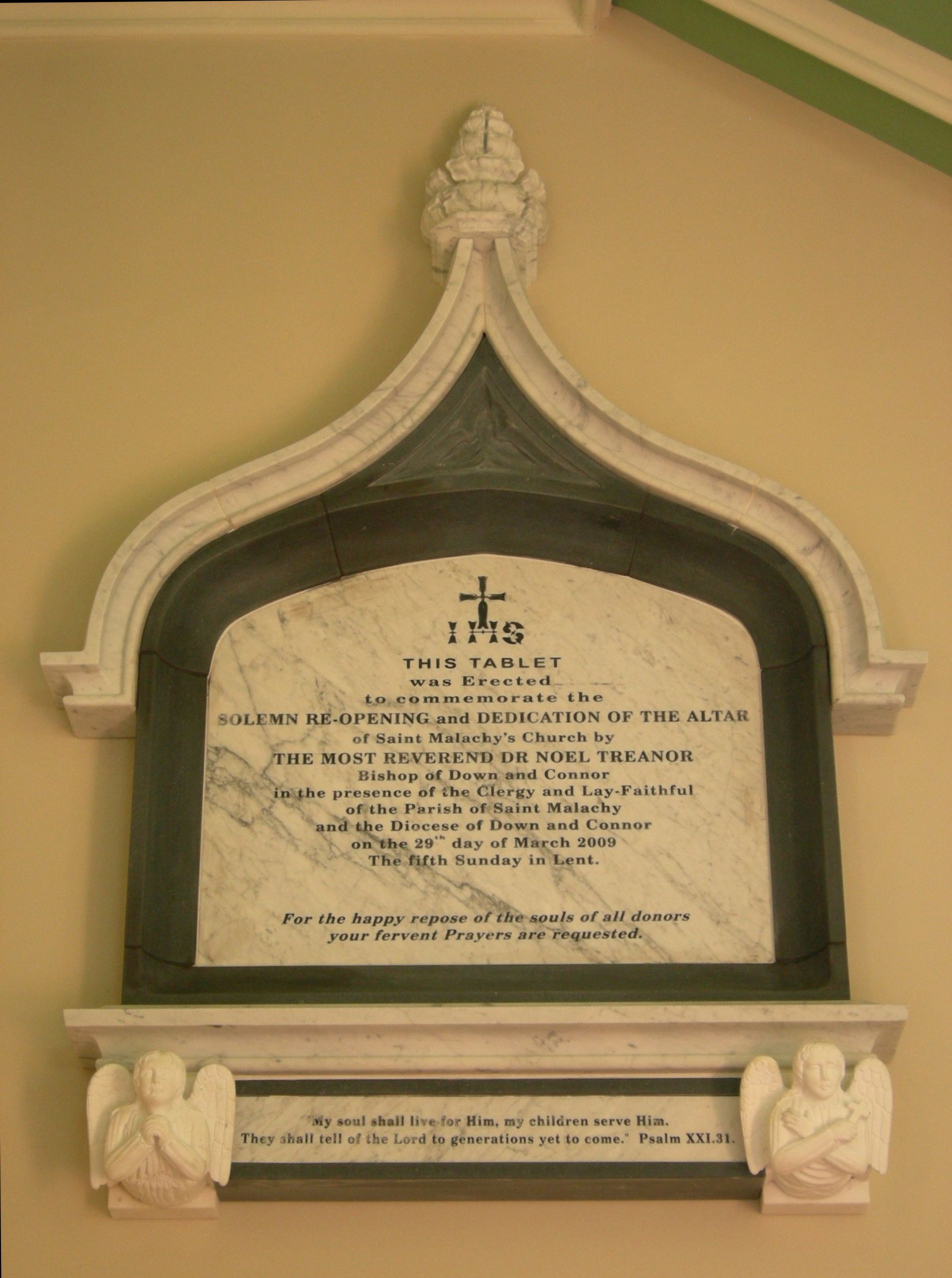
The new monument to commemorate the dedication of the new altar, 2009

This was the first time that Saint Malachy's had been closed for an extended period since the church was opened in 1844. During the restoration, nuptial and Requiem Masses were celebrated in neighbouring churches.

- Sunday Masses are: Vigil (Saturday) 6pm; 10.30am.
- Weekday Masses are at 1pm, Monday, Tuesday, Thursday, Friday.
- There is no Mass on Wednesday.
- Confessions are 5.15 to 5.45pm each Saturday.

== Clergy ==
Administrators and parish priests

- Rev. Geoffrey Brennan Adm. (1866–1882)
- Rev. John P. Greene Adm. (1882–1889)
- Very Rev. Daniel McCashin PP (Administrator 1889 – 1909; PP 1909 –1919)
- Ven. Archdeacon John McKinley PP VG (1919–1934)
- Right Rev. Monsignor Canon James Clenaghan PP VG (1934–1940)
- Ven. Archdeacon John Macaulay PP (1941–1955)
- Right Rev. Monsignor Dean Francis Kerr PP VG (1955–1967)
- Very Rev. Canon John McSparran PP (1967–1973)
- Very Rev. Canon James Close PP (1973–1978)
- Very Rev. Alexander Darragh PP (1978–1982)
- Very Rev. Canon Peter McCann PP (1983–1997)
- Very Rev. Anthony Curran PP VF (1997–2010)
- Very Rev. Michael McGinnity PP (2010–2022)
- Very Rev. Thomas McGlynn PP (2022- )

Curates

1866–1910

- Rev. J. Hamill
- Rev. J. Canavan
- Rev. J. Ryan
- Rev. P. Magorrian
- Rev. M. Hamill
- Rev. J. Moore
- Rev. E. Hassett
- Rev. B. McCann
- Rev. J. O'Boyle
- Rev. R. Crickard
- Rev. T. Twomey
- Rev. J. McArdle
- Rev. J. McIlvenny
- Rev. R. Smyth
- Rev. J. Kennedy
- Rev. D. McGorrian
- Rev. A. Quinn
- Rev. J. Quinn
- Rev. W. McCourt
- Rev. P. McErlean
- Rev. H. Heffron
- Rev. A. Tully
- Rev. M. Laverty
- Rev. F. C. Henry
- Rev. W. J. Kelly
- Rev. J. Nolan
- Rev. D. Magennis
- Rev. M. Leahy
- Rev. G. Crolly
- Rev. B. Laverty
- Rev. J. F. Shiels

1910–1925

- Rev. B. Laverty
- Rev. J. Boylan
- Rev. G. McKay
- Rev. T. McGowan
- Rev. J. Walsh
- Rev. T. H. McAuley
- Rev. D. Tuathail
- Rev. J. Gillan
- Rev. J. McSparran

1925–1947

- Rev. J. Gillan
- Rev. J. McSparran
- Rev. E. Diamond
- Rev. F. Kerr
- Rev. V. Davey
- Rev. D. J. Morgan
- Rev. R. Rogan
- Rev. J. Dean
- Rev. A. Connolly

1947–1965

- Rev. J. Dean
- Rev. A. Connolly
- Rev. F. Scullin
- Rev. J. Moloney
- Rev. F. Corr
- Rev. A. Scott
- Rev. J. Fitzpatrick
- Rev. J. Kennedy

1965–2011

- Rev. Vincent Leonard
- Rev. Denis McAteer
- Rev. Patrick McCrea
- Rev. Aidan Kerr
- Rev. Denis Newberry
- Rev. Andrew McGrattan
- Rev. Anthony McHugh
- Rev. Anthony Curran (Succeeded as Parish Priest)
- Rev. Michael Sheehan
- Rev. Brian McCann
- Rev. Martin Graham

== The Great Bell ==
The church houses the largest bell in Belfast. Close to the church stood a whiskey distillery, and its owners claimed that the peal of the bell was upsetting the distillation process. Contrary to popular belief, the bell was not removed. Instead, it was wrapped in felt to soften its peal and vibration; however, by the time of the restoration work in 2008–2009, the felt had long since rotted away and the full peal of the bell can be heard at least three times daily.

== Awards ==
Since the church reopened in 2009 the restoration work has won high praise and a number of awards from groups within Northern Ireland, in the United Kingdom and in the Republic of Ireland. These include The Aisling Award 2009 (Northern Ireland) for Belfast Brand; The Royal Institution of Chartered Surveyors Award 2010 for Building Conservation; The Royal Institution of Chartered Surveyors Award 2010 for Project of the Year; The Royal Institute of British Architects Award 2010; the Civic Trust Award 2010; The Royal Society of Ulster Architects Conservation Award 2010; The Irish Georgian Society Award 2010.
