= Henry Henry =

Irish Roman Catholic Prelate

The Most Reverend Henry Henry
- Bishop of Down and Connor
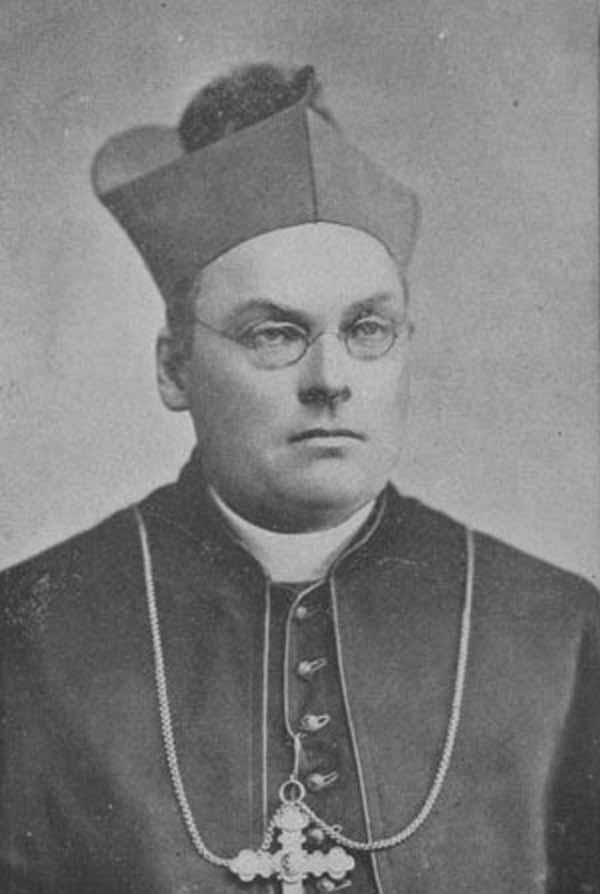
- Church: Catholic Church
- Archdiocese: Archdiocese of Armagh
- Diocese: Diocese of Down and Connor
- In office: 1895–1908
- Predecessor: Patrick MacAlister
- Successor: John Tohill
- Previous post: President St. Malachy's College

Orders
- Ordination: 7 June 1870
- Consecration: 22 Sept 1895 by Michael Logue

Personal details
- Born: 22 May 1846 Loughguile
- Died: 8 March 1908 Belfast

Styles of Henry Henry
- Reference style: The Most Reverend
- Spoken style: Your Lordship or Bishop
- Religious style: Bishop
- Posthumous style: not applicable

Henry Henry (22 May 1846 – 8 March 1908) was an Irish Roman Catholic Prelate and from 1895 until 1908 he held the title Lord Bishop of Down and Connor. He was known for his energy and zeal, as well as his overt activism in local politics, founding the 'Belfast Catholic Association'.

== Education and priestly ministry ==
Henry was born in Loughguile, County Antrim. After his education at St Patrick's College, Maynooth, he was ordained for the Diocese of Down and Connor on 7 June 1870 by Matthew Quinn, the Bishop of Bathurst. The Diocese of Bathurst is located in New South Wales in Australia.

He was appointed to St. Malachy's Diocesan College to teach French and Mathematics, succeeding Fr Richard Marner as President and serving as president from 1876 to 1895. To date he is the longest serving president of the college.

== Bishop ==
He was appointed 25th Bishop of Down and Connor on 6 August 1895 and was consecrated bishop in St Patrick's Church, Belfast on 22 Sept 1895 by Cardinal Logue. One of his first acts was to agree to be patron of the nascent Gaelic League in Belfast. The distinguished Jesuit historian, Fr Oliver P. Rafferty calls Henry Henry "a man of decidedly theocratic tastes" and assesses many of his decisions, especially those relating to politics and civil society as "quixotic."

Dr Henry believed that a religious order of priests could give invaluable help in the densely populated area of West Belfast. Accordingly, he invited the Redemptorists to found a community there at Clonard Monastery. It was a welcome invitation, which they accepted as they were already looking for a foundation in the North.

In 1900, he helped establish St. Mary's Training College to staff local Catholic schools.

== Belfast Gaelic League ==
In 1895, Henry became a patron of the branch in Belfast of the Gaelic League, He was in company of Thomas Welland, the Church of Ireland Bishop of Down, Connor and Dromore, George Raphael Buick, Moderator of the Presbyterian Church, and Richard Rutledge Kane the Church of Ireland rector of Christ Church in Belfast and the city's Orange Order Grand Master.

== Belfast Catholic Association ==
In 1896, Bishop Henry organised a Catholic Association, initially confined to controlling representation in the newly created Catholic wards [of Belfast]. It dominated municipal politics in West Belfast for a decade: it easily defeated the Nationalist slate of candidates in the two wards in 1897 and 1904, and between these dates its candidates were not even challenged. Its viewpoint dominated the Irish News, the local Catholic newspaper, to such an extent that the Irish Nationalist leader in the city, Joseph Devlin, had to begin a rival, the Northern Star, in 1897.

Henry's episcopal ministry took place against the intensely fought political battles around Irish Home Rule and he worked hard to influence - some might say shape directly - nationalist political opinion, and representation in Belfast, at the heart of his diocese. By 1912, however, Devlin had won control of nationalist thought in the city.

== Death ==
He took ill at a concert in St. Mary's Hall in Belfast in March 1908 and died at the scene. His Requiem Mass took place at St Patrick's Church, Belfast. His grave in Milltown Cemetery is in a very prominent position near the entrance where the road forks in two.

Before his death, Henry took out money against both of the Henry family farms. After he passed, there was an attempt to seize both farms, however, upon the intervention of the Church, the Henry family was able to keep them both.
