= Clonard Monastery =

Catholic church and monastery in Belfast, Northern Ireland

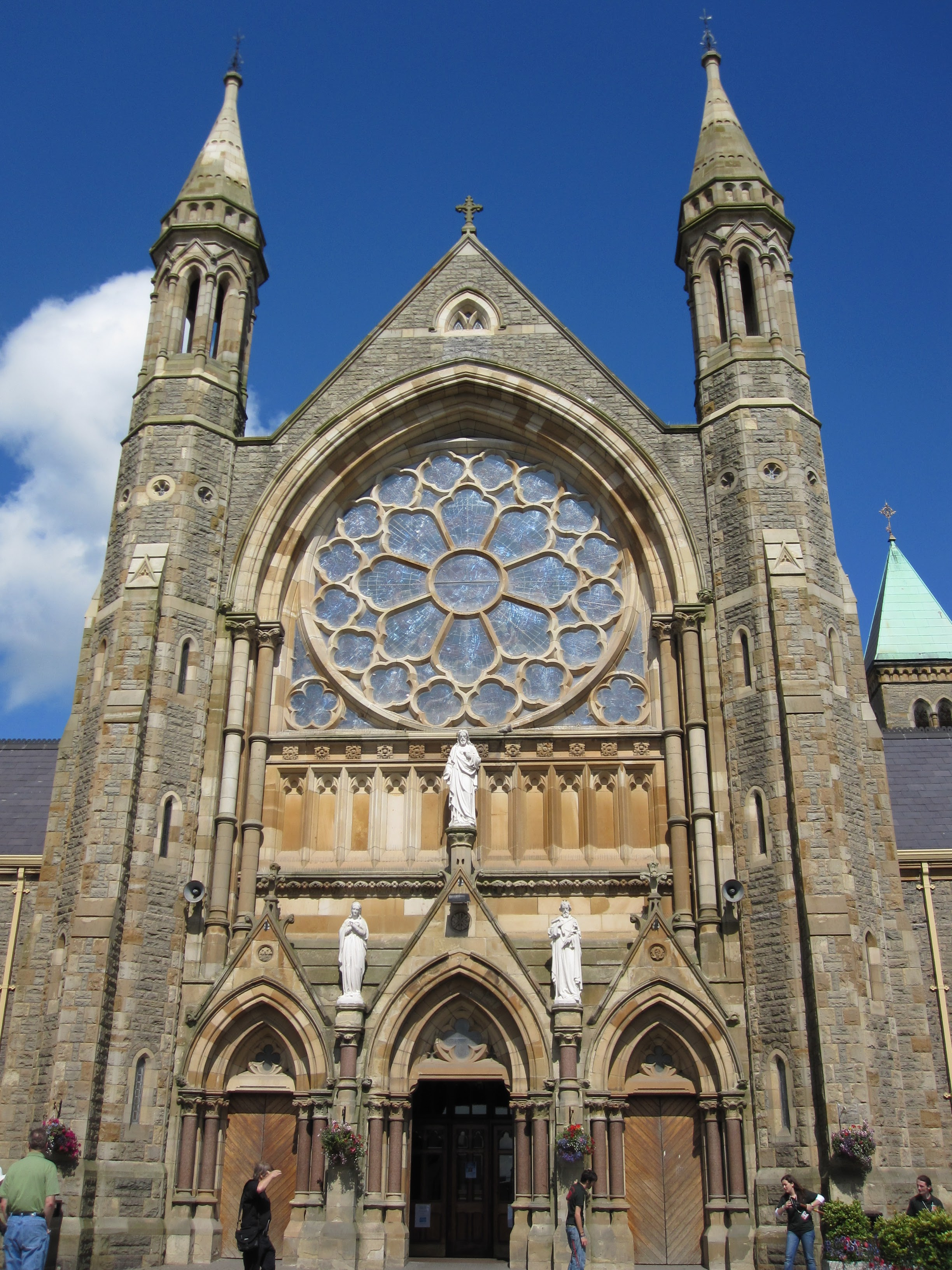
Close up of Clonard Church

Clonard Monastery is a Catholic church located off the Falls Road in Belfast, Northern Ireland, and home to a community of the Redemptorists religious order.

== History ==
In late 19th century Belfast, the Catholic population grew to such an extent that the provision of pastoral support to the working class was practically impossible for members of the diocesan clergy. The Bishop of Down and Connor Henry Henry invited the Redemptorists religious order to come to Belfast in 1896.

Initially the Redemptorists built a small tin church in the grounds of Clonard House in 1897. In 1890 a monastery or community residence was opened in these grounds in the early French Gothic style. Eventually in 1911 the Church of the Holy Redeemer opened in the grounds of the community residence replacing the tin church.

== Restoration ==
In 2008 the church was restored in a £3,000,000, four-year project. The work was completed in 2012.

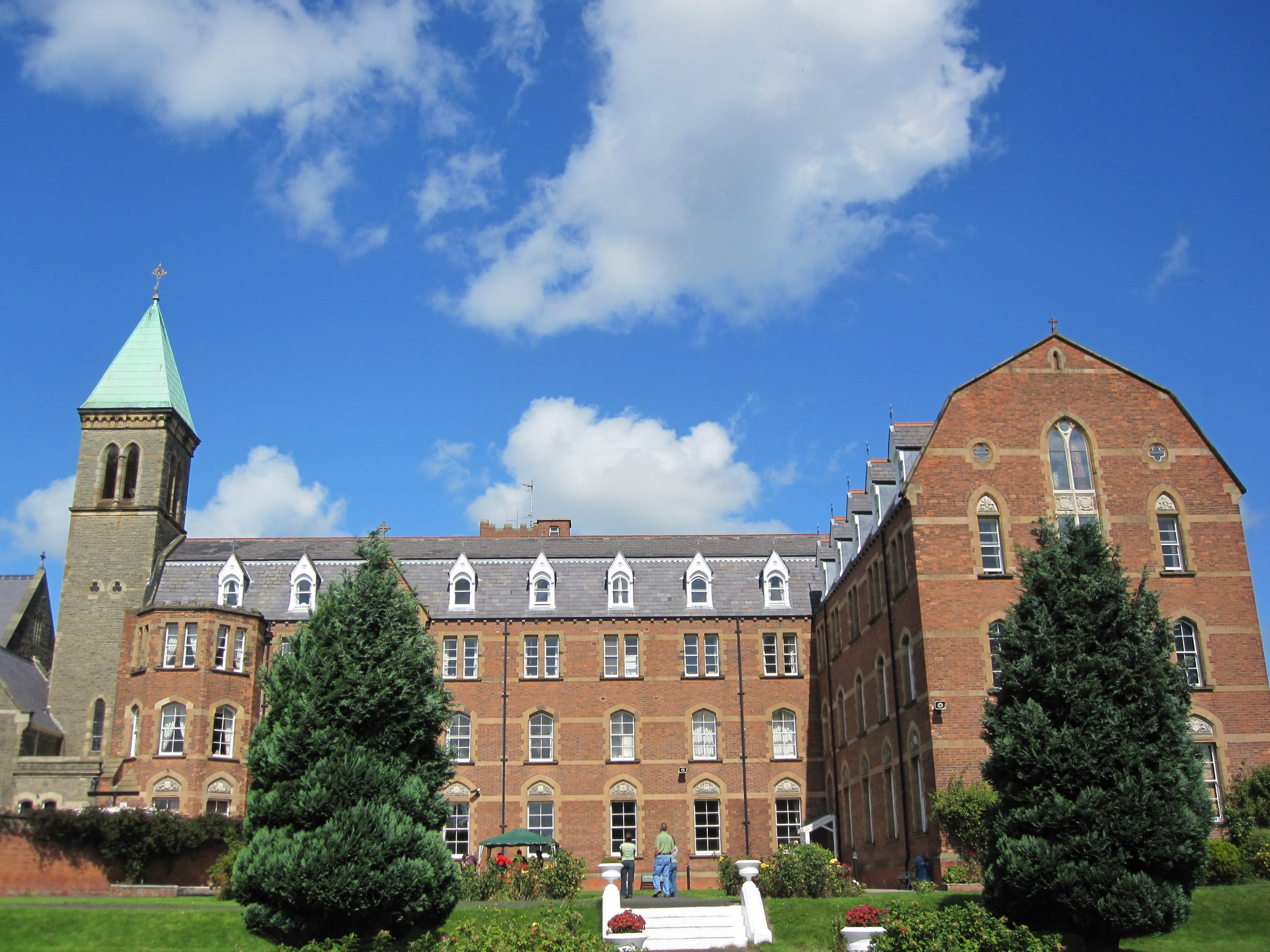
Clonard Church Garden and Accommodation area

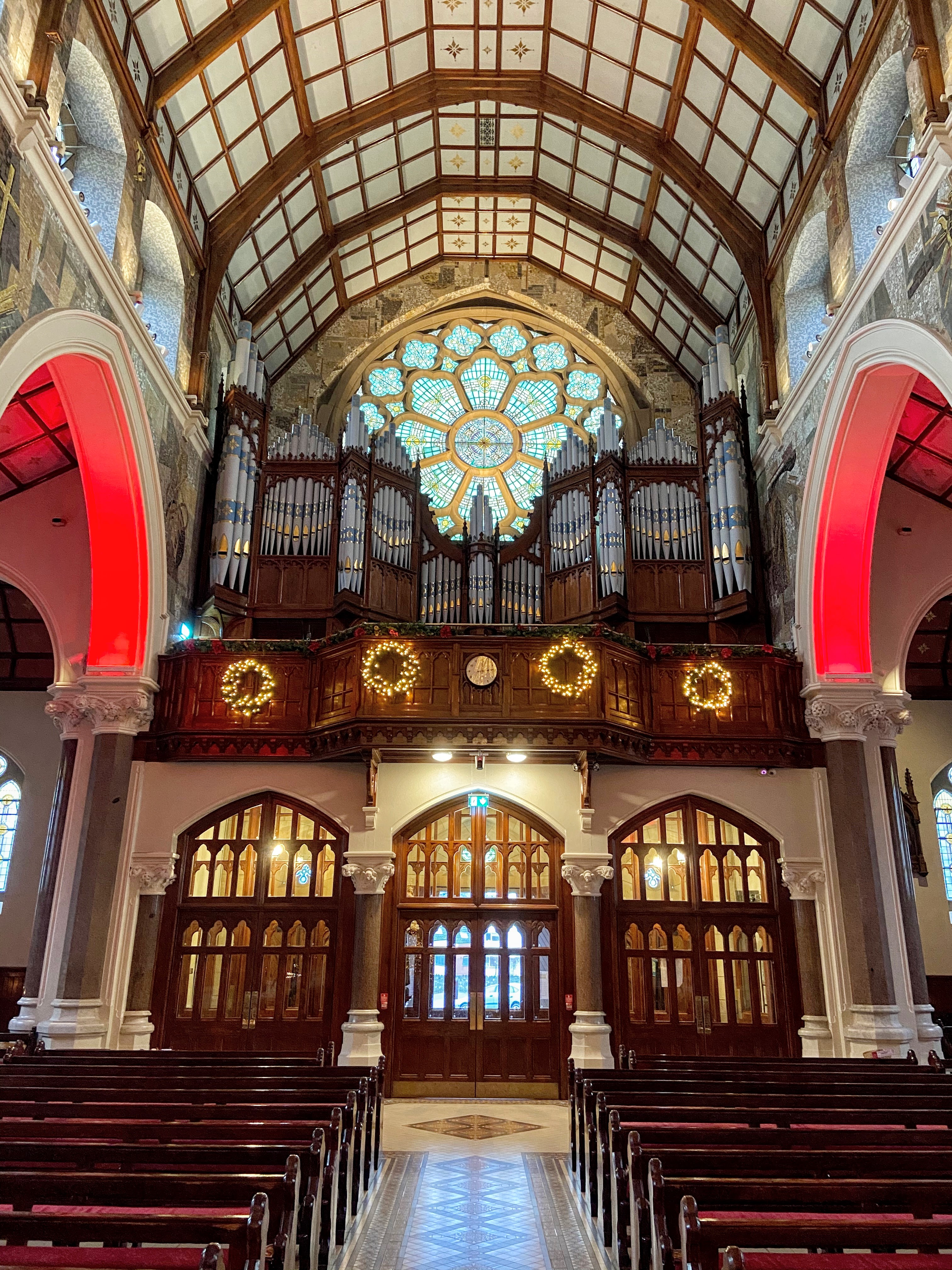
Interior of Clonard Church

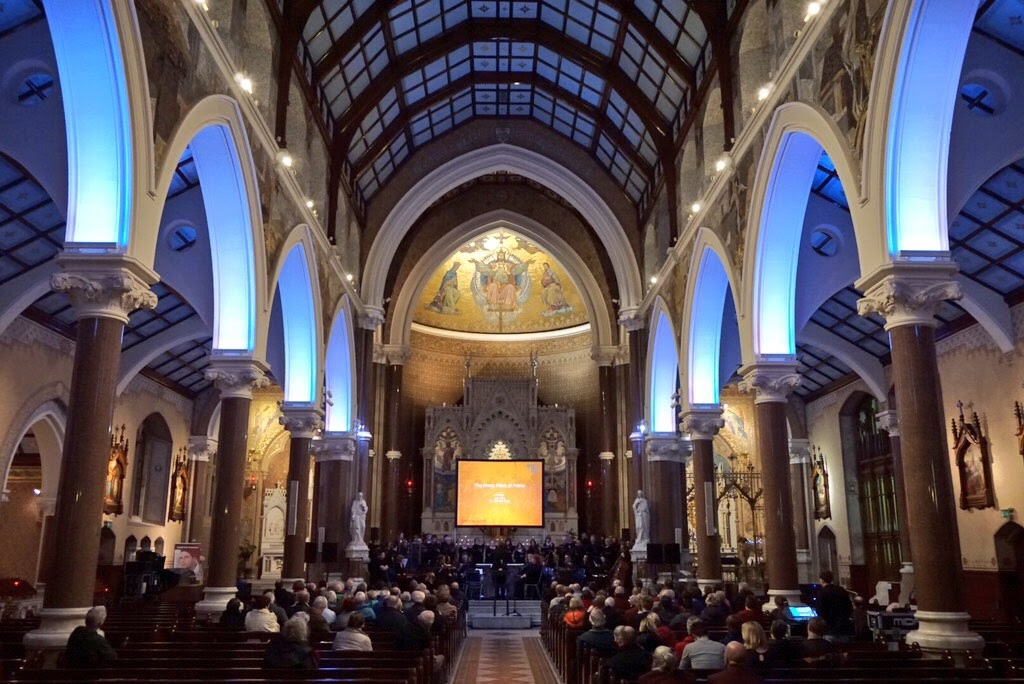
Interior of Clonard Church – Altar

== Religious devotion ==
Over the years the Clonard community has promoted a range of initiatives in religious devotion.

One of the earliest was the establishment of confraternities for men and women which occurred in 1897 and which were, at the time, an innovative combination of religious services and instruction and proved extremely popular. However, due to declining numbers the women's confraternity ceased to function in 2019 and the following years the men's confraternity closed.

According to a book on the history of the community two further devotional developments took place at Clonard "the first was the inauguration of a 'perpetual' novena in honour of Our Lady of Perpetual Succour. The second, was the 'Mission to non-Catholics', made possible in part by the easing of sectarian tension produced by the shared danger of war."

The Clonard community continues to hold the annual Novena in honour of Our Lady of Perpetual Succour attracting an accumulated number of over 100,000 pilgrims, Catholic and Protestant, from across Ireland.

== Clonard and The Troubles ==
Clonard sits on the frontline of the troubles which erupted in Belfast in August 1969, located as it is, at an interface area between the mainly Catholic Falls Road district and the mainly Protestant Shankill Road district. At the rear of the monastery was located Bombay Street and Cupar Street which led on to the Shankill Road.

On 14 August 1969, loyalists from the Shankill Road launched a series of attacks on the houses owned by Catholics in those streets. The residents were forced to flee and many of the houses were burnt to the ground including the whole of Bombay Street.

The priests from Clonard were actively involved from the outset in attempting to safeguard the local residents.

Two of Northern Ireland's most significant clergy who worked for peace, Frs. Alec Reid and Gerry Reynolds, lived here.

== Contemporary pastoral outreach ==
In 1981 members of the Redemptorist community at Clonard established links with Fitzroy Presbyterian Church near Queen's University, Belfast in the south of the city and the monastery became a centre for peacemaking and reconciliation. Secret conversations between John Hume and Gerry Adams were held in rooms in the complex while wider, interfaith conversations helped contribute to the 1994 IRA ceasefire.

Clonard is also used as a music venue for many festivals in the city, most notably but not exclusively Féile an Phobail.
