= Noel Conway (priest) =

Irish Catholic priest

Canon Noel Conway was a Catholic priest of the Diocese of Down and Connor and former president of the prestigious St. Malachy's College, Belfast.

== Early life and education ==
He attended St Mary's Christian Brothers' Grammar School, Belfast, before entering St. Malachy's College as a seminarian and then attended Queen's University, Belfast. He took a science degree, specialising in physics and then studied theology at the St. Patrick's College, Maynooth.

Conway was ordained to the priesthood on 23 June 1957 and has spent the greater part of his priestly career as a teacher in St. Malachy's College, Belfast. In 1983 he succeeded Patrick Walsh as president of St Malachy's College. One of his most significant, if tangential, achievements was to preserve the O'Laverty collections of historical papers and books that today forms an important resource for the wider history of Belfast.

He served as president until 1994 and then after recuperation from illness was, in 1995, appointed parish priest of Strangford in County Down.

== Family background ==
He is the youngest of three brothers who became priests in the Diocese of Down and Connor - the eldest was Cardinal William Conway, then Canon Joseph Conway who also taught at St. Malachy's College and who in 1967, was appointed the founding president of the then St. Patrick's College, Knock.
