= St Patrick's Church, Belfast =

Coordinates: 54°35′57″N 5°56′40″W

Saint Patrick's Church
- Saint Patrick's Church, Belfast
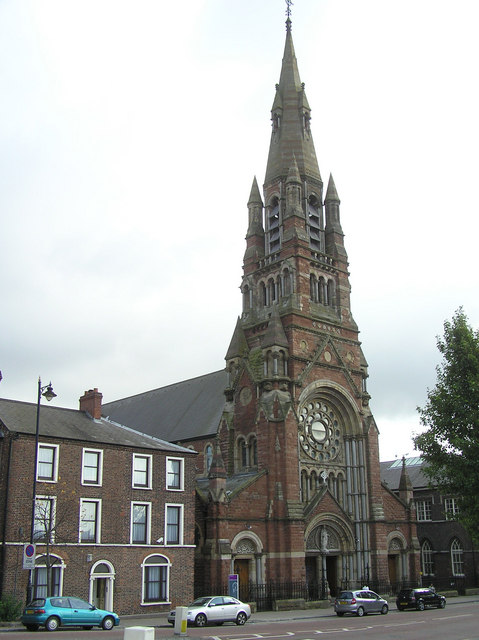

- Location within Northern Ireland
- Location: Belfast, County Antrim
- Country: Northern Ireland
- Denomination: Catholic
- Website: St Patrick's Church

History
- Consecrated: 12 August 1877

Architecture
- Architect: Timothy Hevey
- Style: Gothic Revival
- Years built: 1875–1877

Specifications
- Length: 125 ft (38 m)

Administration
- Province: Armagh
- Diocese: Down and Connor

Clergy
- Bishop: Alan McGuckian

St. Patrick's Church, Belfast (Irish: Eaglais Naomh Padraig) is a Catholic church located in the Donegall Street area of Belfast, Northern Ireland. It is built in the Romanesque Revival style, with a four-stage tower and spire rising from the front west elevation. The first church opened on the site in 1815, while the current building opened in 1877.

In 2024 the parish is served by only one priest, Eugene O'Neill. It is the first time in over two hundred years that there has been just one cleric to serve the parish.

== First church ==
Belfast's first Catholic church was St Mary's, Chapel Lane. With the growth of the Catholic population in the early nineteenth century, Bishop William Crolly, then a priest in residence in the small Georgian town, decided to construct a new church on a plot of land in Donegall Street which had been left in trust for the Catholic inhabitants of Belfast. Construction on this church – made possible in part by the contribution of Belfast's educated Protestants and civic elite – began in 1811 under the dedication of Ireland's patron saint Patrick and opened in 1815.

Following the Great Famine, Belfast's Catholic population swelled considerably and, while other churches and new parishes were developed, by the early 1870s it was clear St. Patrick's needed an entirely new and larger church. The last Mass in the first church was celebrated on 1 August 1875.

== Current church ==
The new (current) church was designed by the architect Timothy Hevey, Belfast's leading Catholic architect of the period. It was built by Collen Brothers of Portadown and Dublin; they constructed the new church around the old one, which was then demolished.

The entire fabric of the new church, designed to seat 2000 people, was completed for blessing on 12 August 1877 by the Primate of All Ireland, Archbishop Daniel McGettigan of Armagh.

Bishop Patrick Dorrian, who early in his ministry had served in the parish, and who authorised the construction of the present building, is interred in the church.

The splendour and scale of the church meant it was the chosen venue for the episcopal consecrations of Bishops Henry Henry in 1895, John Tohill in 1908, Joseph MacRory in 1915 and Daniel Mageean in 1929.

One notable feature is a 7 feet (2.1 m) tall statue of St Patrick above the door which (like the altar) was carved by the English-born James Pearse, father of Padraig Pearse.

A two-ton bell, cast by Thomas Sheridan of Dublin, had already been placed into the 180 feet (55 m) high spire.

It is a Grade B+ listed building. In the summer of 2017 it was reported that the church needed millions of pounds to complete restoration.

== Sir John Lavery ==
The church houses a triptych by a native of the parish, Sir John Lavery, who was baptised in the older, smaller church. He created The Madonna of the Lakes using his wife Hazel Lavery and step-daughter as models. In 1917, Lavery contacted the then Administrator Father John O'Neill with the intention of donating a piece of art to the church. The triptych, depicting three images – Our Lady flanked by St Brigid and St Patrick – was unveiled in April 1919. It originally stood on an altar designed by Edwin Lutyens, a friend of Lavery, and was illuminated by two Lutyens candlesticks. Both the altar and the candlesticks are now lost, and the frame around the triptych remains as the only Lutyens-designed artefact in Northern Ireland.

The artwork was the centrepiece of an historic visit by Charles, Prince of Wales and his wife Camilla, Duchess of Cornwall to the church in May 2015 to mark St. Patrick's bicentenary. The couple viewed the triptych after a short service of prayer.

== St. Patrick's School ==
Adjacent to the church is the refurbished St. Patrick's School, constructed in 1828 by the Belfast builder Timothy Hevey, father of the architect of the same name who designed the church. This was the first Catholic school to be built in Belfast on land donated by the Marquess of Donegall.

For much of its history the school was operated by the Christian Brothers and was a functioning primary school until 1982. After it closed it served briefly as a parish community centre, and at one stage the parish clergy wanted to demolish the school for a large car park.

== St. Joseph's Church, Sailortown ==
In August 1880 a second church opened in the parish, closer to the docks areas known popularly as Sailortown. This church, dedicated to St. Joseph, was opened by Bishop Patrick Dorrian and designed, like many other Catholic buildings in the city at the time, by Timothy Hevey.

St. Joseph's closed due to falling numbers in 2001.
