= Cornelius Denvir =

Irish Roman Catholic prelate and mathematician

The Most Reverend Bishop Cornelius Denvir
- Roman Catholic Diocese of Down and Connor
- Church: Catholic Church
- Diocese: Diocese of Down and Connor
- In office: 1835 - 1866; (died)
- Predecessor: William Crolly
- Successor: Patrick Dorrian

Orders
- Ordination: 31 May 1814
- Consecration: 22 Nov 1835 by William Crolly

Personal details
- Born: 13 August 1791 County Down
- Died: 10 July 1866 Belfast, Northern Ireland

Styles of Cornelius Denvir
- Reference style: The Most Reverend
- Spoken style: Your Lordship or Bishop
- Religious style: Bishop
- Posthumous style: not applicable

Cornelius Denvir (1791–1866) was an Irish Roman Catholic prelate, mathematician, natural philosopher and former Lord Bishop of Down and Connor. He is noted for ministering in Belfast amidst growing sectarian tension, taking a moderate and non-confrontational stance, to the annoyance of his pro-Catholic followers. He was also a professor at Maynooth College as well as Down and Connor Diocesan College, and was active in the local scientific community.

== Early life ==
Cornelius Denvir was born on 13 August 1791 in Ballyculter, County Down. He was educated at Dr. Nelson's Classical School in Downpatrick, being described by peers as an enthusiastic child with a love for sight-seeing. According to one biographer, young Denvir also showed interest in the Catechism by attending local visits from the then Bishop of Down and Connor Patrick MacMullan who was resident in Downpatrick. In September 1808, Denvir enrolled at Maynooth College, and was appointed chair of Natural Philosophy and Mathematics there in August 1813.

Denvir was ordained first as deacon in June 1813, then a priest in May 1814, performing his liturgical duties in conjunction with his academic ones. In 1826, Denvir left Maynooth College to become the Parish priest of Downpatrick. In 1833 he became a professor at the newly founded St. Malachy's College, teaching classes in Latin, Greek and Mathematics. He continued his duties as parish priest and professor until 1835, when he was appointed Bishop of Down and Connor in succession to William Crolly.

== Ministry ==
=== Bishop of Down and Connor ===
As 22nd Lord Bishop of Down and Connor, Denvir emphasised the teaching of the Catechism to youth as well as emphasising the importance of scripture to the diocese. In 1841 he helped fund the start of construction of St Malachy's Church in Belfast, which was completed in 1845. In his later years, Denvir fell under criticism by other Belfast Catholics, who claimed Denvir was neglectful of his duties, especially those relating to expanding and defending Catholicism in the face of growing Protestant influence. Some accounts attribute Denvir's shortcomings to poor health and temperament, while others suggest that Denvir backed away from expansion to avoid conflict with Protestant groups.

Denvir suffered from personal finance problems during his time as Bishop. The construction of St Malachy's Church put him into deep personal debt, which he was apparently arrested for some time after 1844. Denvir was also criticised for selling seats in the newly constructed church to offset costs. He was also described as reluctant in asking for funds from parishioners, severely limiting his resources with which to care for the church.

After years of illness compounded by age, in 1860 Denvir was assigned Patrick Dorrian as a coadjutor to assist in his episcopal duties. While ill health may have been the predominant reason for the appointment of a coadjutor, contemporary newspaper accounts suggest there may also have been an ideological reason for the appointment. In The Spectator it was noted in December 1859 'it may be, because he (Denvir) is too liberal for the Cullen epoch.'

In May 1865, Denvir resigned as Bishop and was succeeded by Dorrian. Denvir died one year later on 10 July 1866, in his residence on Donegall St, after suffering from fainting fits a few days prior. He was buried in Ballycruttle Church.

=== Commissioner of National Education ===
Denvir was appointed Commissioner of National Education in 1853. He is noted for being supportive of non-denominational education and investigating reports of proselytism in public primary education. He later resigned this position in 1857 on request of the Holy See to focus on expanding the local Catholic school system.

=== Professor and Scientist ===
As chair of mathematics and natural philosophy at Maynooth, Denvir is noted for changing the style of education at the college from pure logic-based reasoning in Mathematics to a more holistic, topical approach. He is also noted for emphasising experimentation and the importance of the scientific method in teaching natural philosophy, with several sources noting his well-stocked labs.

=== Other roles ===
Aside from his duties as a professor, Denvir owned a large galvanised battery, which he loaned out for experimentation and public spectacle. He was also active in the local scientific community, becoming a member of the Natural History and Philosophical Society and the Chemico-Agricultural society of Ulster. One notable feature about Denvir's scientific activity is that it led him to meet frequently with other ministers from different denominations, an irregularity at the time.

== Legacy ==
While at Maynooth College Denvir taught both Nicholas Callan, the inventor and physicist, and Dominic Corrigan, the noted Irish physician. According to several accounts, both spoke fondly of their old professor, to the point of Callan gifting Denvir one of his induction coils in thanks.
