= Ronan Deazley =

British legal scholar

- Occupation: Legal scholar

Academic background
- Education: LLB, PhD
- Alma mater: Queen's University Belfast

Academic work
- Discipline: Law
- Sub-discipline: Theory and history of copyright law
- Institutions: The University of Glasgow School of Law

Ronan Deazley is a British legal scholar, academic and author. He took his LLB (1996) and PhD (2000) from Queen's University Belfast. His current specialism and research interests are in the theory of copyright law (and its history). He is a member of the Oral History Society and the Regional Coordinator for Northern Ireland. He is on the editorial board of the European Journal of Law and Technology (EJLT).

He became a faculty member at the University of Glasgow School of Law as a Professor of Copyright Law in August 2009, having previously taught at the University of Birmingham and the University of Durham. In September 2015 he returned to his alma mater, Queen's University Belfast, to take up a chair in copyright law.

In 2015, and alongside Bartolomeo Meletti, Ronan Deazley received the Arts and Humanities Research Councils (AHRC) Innovation Award for Research in Film. This was for their work 'The Adventure of the Girl with the Light Blue Hair' the first episode in 'The Game is On' webseries.

== Bibliography ==
- On the Origin of the Right to Copy: Charting the Movement of Copyright Law in Eighteenth Century Britain (1695-1775) (Hart Publishing, 2004)
- Re-Thinking Copyright: History, Theory, Language (Edward Elgar, 2006 and 2008)
