= Mater Infirmorum Hospital =

- Belfast Health and Social Care Trust
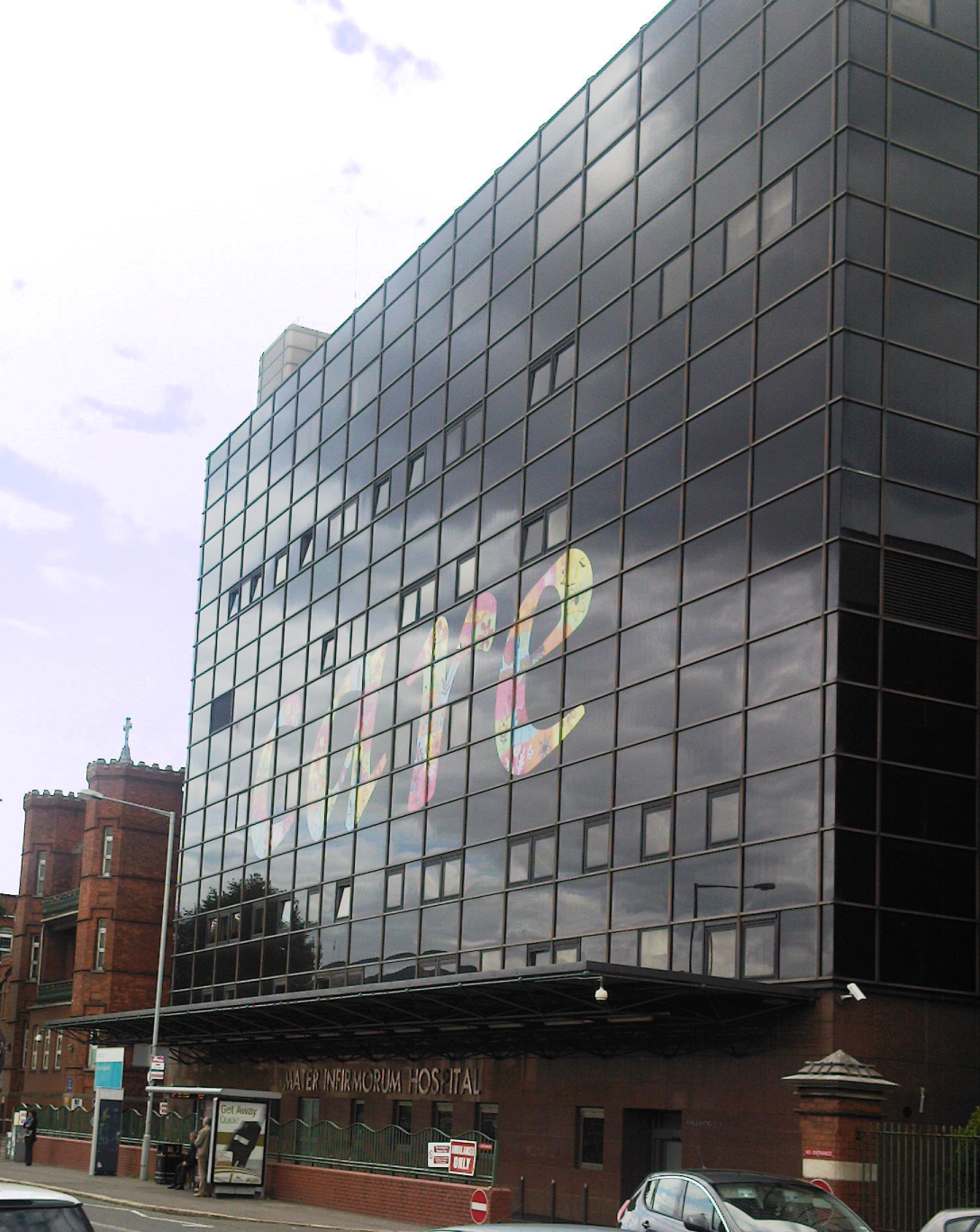
- Entrance to the hospital, Crumlin Road

- Location in Northern Ireland

Geography
- Location: Crumlin Road, Belfast, Northern Ireland
- Coordinates: 54.609°N 5.940°W

Organisation
- Care system: Health and Social Care in Northern Ireland
- Type: District General
- Affiliated university: Queen's University Belfast

Services
- Emergency department: Yes
- Beds: 236

History
- Founded: 1883

Links
- Website: www.belfasttrust.hscni.net

The Mater Infirmorum Hospital, commonly known as The Mater, is an acute hospital in Belfast, Northern Ireland. It provides services to most of North Belfast and South Antrim, reaching as far as Glengormley, Carrickfergus and Newtownabbey It is managed by the Belfast Health and Social Care Trust.

== History ==
The Mater Infirmorum (Mother of the Sick) Hospital has been serving the people of Belfast since it admitted its first patients in premises on the Crumlin Road in Belfast, known as Bedeque House, on 1 November 1883. It was initially founded by the Sisters of Mercy but has always treated patients without regard to class or creed. Between 1841 and 1891, the population of Belfast dramatically increased from 75,308 to 255,922. In 1895, Dr Patrick MacAlister, the Bishop of Down and Connor, arranged for expansion of the Mater Infirmorum Hospital with construction of a new building on Mountview Terrace.

The main hospital, which was designed by William Fennell, was officially opened by Sir Robert McConnell, Lord Mayor of Belfast, on 22 April 1900. The hospital was officially recognised as a university teaching hospital for university students of Queen's University in 1908.

In June 1922, the hospital was subjected to an armed attack: the hospital management wrote to King George V, David Lloyd George, Winston Churchill and Michael Collins seeking protection and the incident did not happen again. A landmine exploded outside the hospital leading to numerous casualties in April 1941 during the Belfast Blitz of the Second World War. A new maternity wing opened in 1945.

Much of the fund raising for modernisation of the hospital in the 1950s was carried out by the Young Philanthropists Association. This included the first neuro-psychiatry department which opened in 1952. It was the first hospital in Northern Ireland to treat injured soldiers from the British Army in October 1969 and became fully integrated into the National Health Service in 1972. A new block, incorporating a new accident and emergency unit, a new out-patients department, a new radiology department, an operating theatre suite and a 35-bed maternity unit, opened at the hospital in 1989.

During the COVID-19 pandemic the Mater became Belfast's dedicated hospital for COVID-19 patients.
