= Ballyhaise =

Village in County Cavan, Ireland

Ballyhaise Béal Átha hÉis
- Village
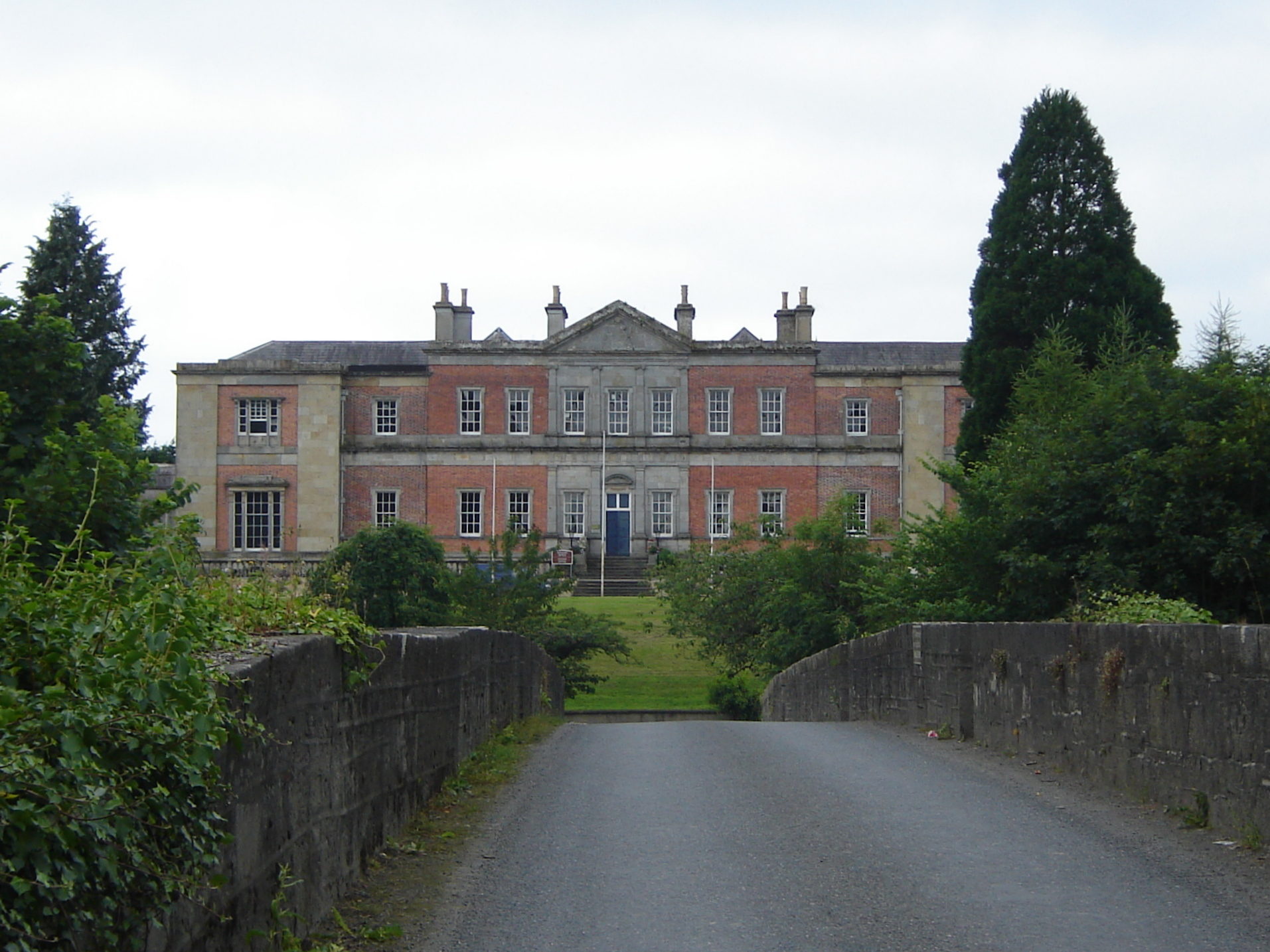
- Ballyhaise House, now part of Ballyhaise Agricultural College run by Teagasc

- Location in Ireland
- Coordinates: 54°03′N 7°19′W
- Country: Ireland
- Province: Ulster
- County: County Cavan
- Barony: Loughtee Upper
- Civil Parish: Castletara
- Elevation: 84 m (276 ft)

Population (2022)
  - Total: 748
- Time zone: UTC+0 (WET)
  - Summer (DST): UTC-1 (IST (WEST))
- Irish Grid Reference: H446110

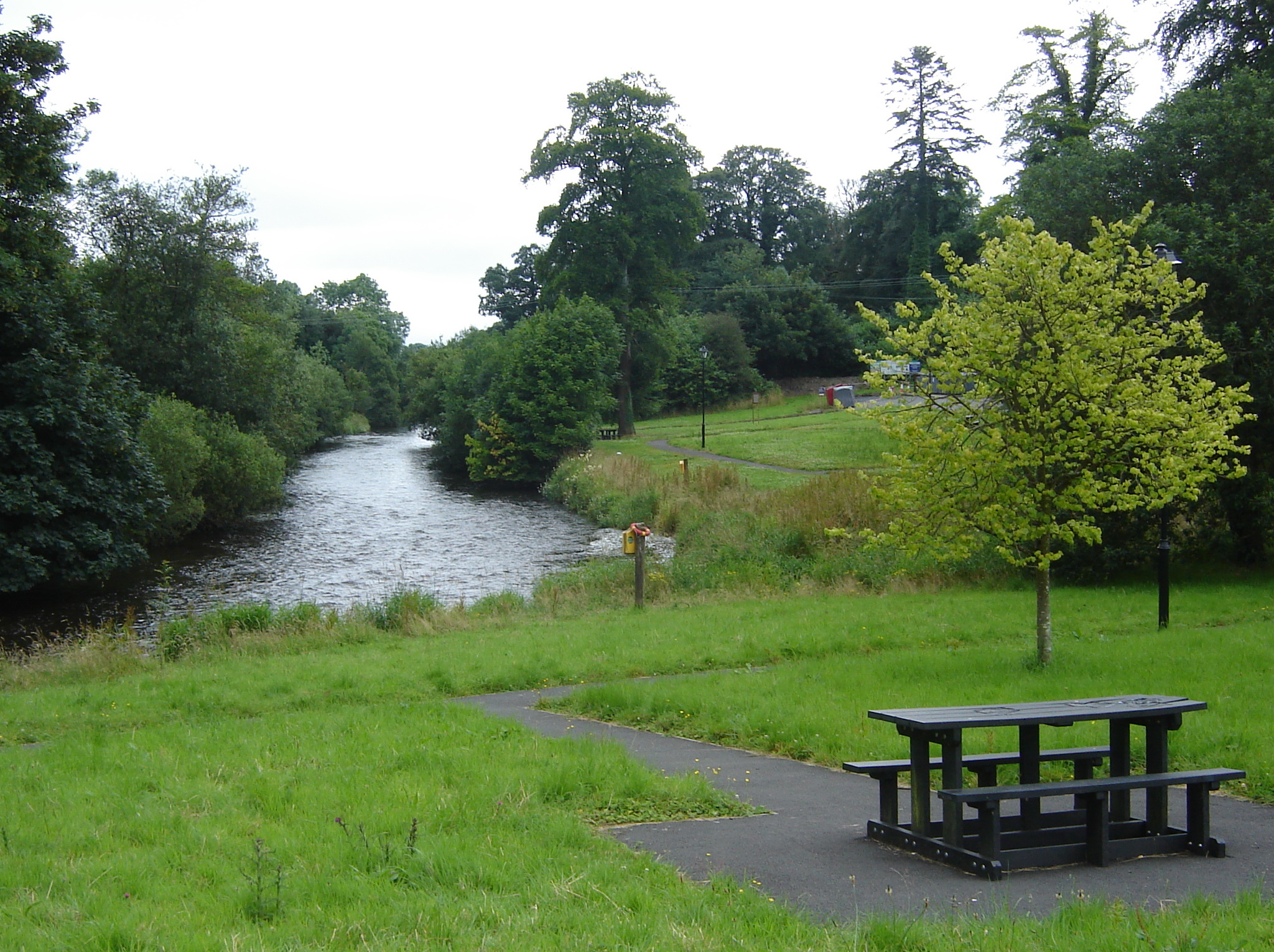
The River Annalee at Ballyhaise

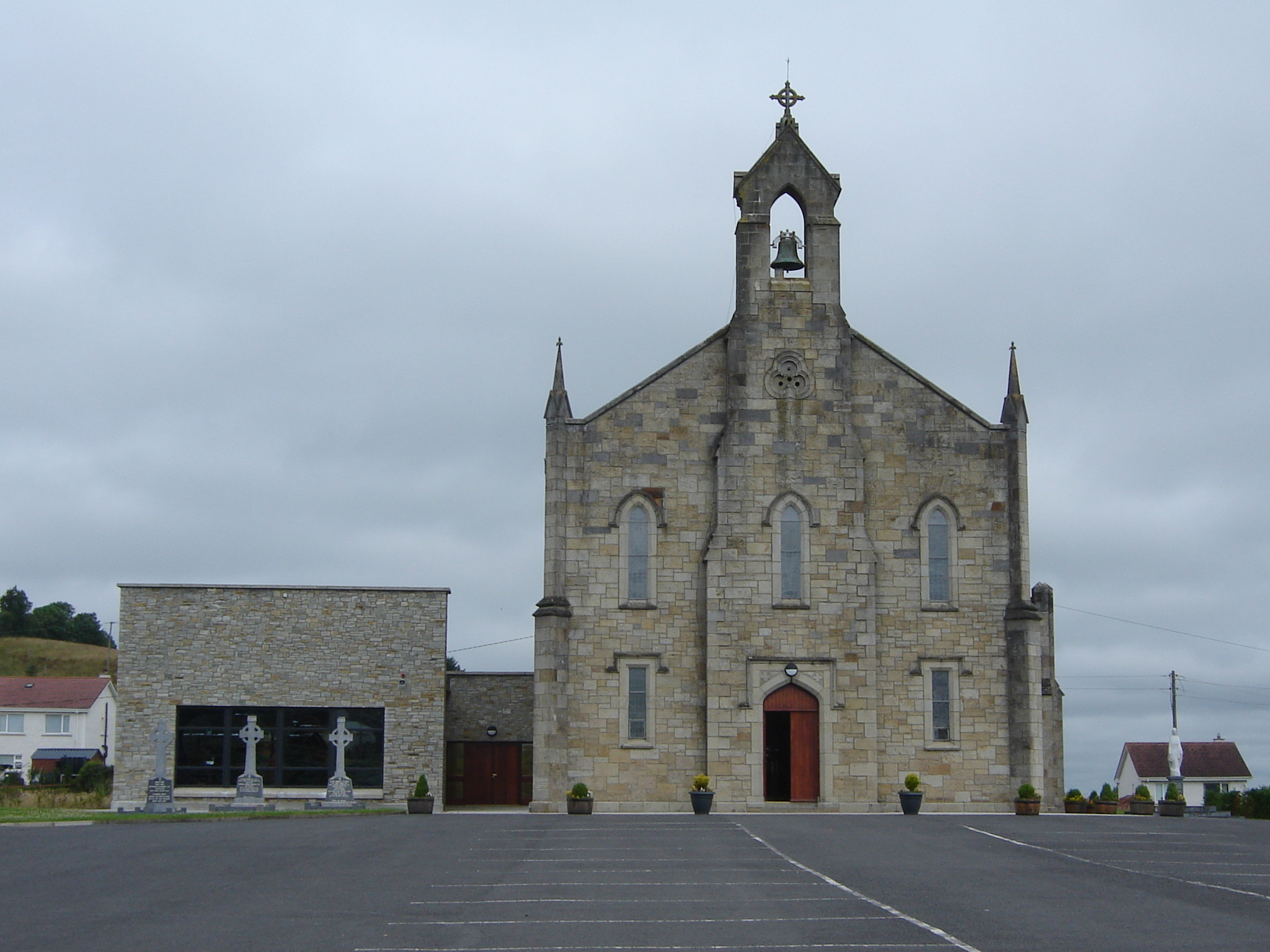
St. Mary's Church, the Catholic parish church in Ballyhaise.

Ballyhaise (/ˈbæliːˌheɪz/; Irish: Béal Átha hÉis) is a village in County Cavan, Ireland. It is situated approximately 7 km (4.3 mi) north-northeast of Cavan and 11 km, via the N54, from the border with County Fermanagh in Northern Ireland. The River Annalee flows near the village. As of 2022, the village had a population of 748.

== Location ==
The village of Ballyhaise is located within the parish of Castletara and contains both Roman Catholic and Church of Ireland churches.

== History ==
Ballyhaise has elements of a planned, Palladian estate village which was built to facilitate a local linen industry in the 1700s. The industry had failed by the 1800s. The remnants of the Ballyhaise Estate Village lie in the possession of the state who acquired Ballyhaise House in 1905, which has been run as an agricultural college ever since. The elaborate gardens of Colonel Newburgh's Ballyhaise House have ceased to exist with time, but Rev. William Henry's words in 1739 remain that Ballyhaise was 'made to last forever.'

=== Origins of Ballyhaise village ===
In 1609, at the beginning of James I's Plantation of Ulster, English settler John Taylor was awarded a 1,500-acre grant of land in Aghieduff in County Cavan. This was in the barony between Loughtee Upper and Loughtee Lower which had been previously under the rule of the O'Reilly clan. Taylor established the town of Ballyhaise, encouraging both English and Scottish settlers to settle on the land. Taylor is said to have erected 'a strong bawn of lime and stone for his own residence on the site of the present house from which he would command the fort over the river.' A 1618-19 survey revealed that eighteen families had settled and 'everything in the infant colony appeared in a most prosperous condition.' The 1641 Irish Rebellion, which was led by Sir Féilim Ruadh Ó Néill, disrupted the village's development. County Cavan was retrieved by native rebels forcing settlers to flee. By the mid-1650s, the territory was regained by Sir Charles Coote, and further expulsions of Catholic Irish from County Cavan, County Monaghan, County Tyrone and East Donegal took place in the immediate aftermath of the Battle of Scarrifholis, which was fought near Conwal, on the outskirts of Letterkenny, up in the north-west of Ulster. The restoration of Charles II to the throne in 1660 saw the Ballyhaise settlement resume and begin to progress.

=== Development of Ballyhaise estate village ===
Estate villages were typically known to be villages based around one estate, usually owned and preserved by one family. The Ballyhaise Estate passed through the Taylor family. Brockhill Taylor, an MP for the borough of Cavan in the 1630s and the eldest son of John Taylor, held possession of the estate until his death. Brockhill Taylor's Ballyhaise Estate then passed to his eldest daughter, Mary. Mary's marriage into the Newburgh family saw possession of the Ballyhaise Estate pass into the hands of the Newburgh family. The significant development of Ballyhaise can be attributed to Colonel Brockhill Newburgh, who obtained the estate through marriage. As the High Sheriff of Cavan, a serving MP and the chairman of the local linen board, Colonel Newburgh oversaw notable developments and upgrades to Ballyhaise.

Newburgh and another local landowner constructed an arched stone structured bridge over the River Annalee in the same period as Newburgh embarked on constructing a new planned estate village. He had a great vision for the estate and village, one that was laid out with 'great taste'. It adopted the experimental shape of an octagon with the circular, arched market place at the centre of the village and radial roads emerging from the heart. The houses were built in an unusual manner, whilst the surroundings were 'richly-wooded'. The gardens were elaborately arranged with 'ponds, jets d'eau, fruit and flowers'.

The village and demesne of Ballyhaise was renowned for its beauty and characterised by the innovative urban planning programme undertaken by Colonel Newburgh. It was said that visitors would travel “far and near” to observe the scenery and buildings in the village of Ballyhaise. The interesting architectural style of the houses in the town along with the house, grottoes and gardens were the main points of attraction in the village. The Ballyhaise Estate remained in the Newburgh family until around 1800, when it was sold to Dublin-based merchant, William Humphreys.

== Notable buildings ==
=== Ballyhaise House ===
Ballyhaise House is situated on the River Annalee (a tributary of the Erne). It was built for the Newburghs, a local landowning family, in the early eighteenth century, replacing the previous house built by John Taylor. Although a date of 1733 is often given for the start of the construction of Ballyhaise House, most architectural historians now believe that the house was begun slightly earlier than this. It is said to contain the earliest surviving oval room in Ireland and Britain. The building was traditionally credited to Richard Cassels, a German architect living in Dublin, who designed many of the capital's finest buildings and squares (including Leinster House). More recently, its thought that Ballyhaise House was designed by the architect of Parliament House in Dublin, Sir Edward Lovett Pearce. The core of the building consisted of two story's over half-basement, and of seven bays. The house was the focal point of this Palladian scheme that was extended on either side by quadrants terminating into pavilion wings None of these interior features of the house remain today.

=== Ballyhaise Market House ===
The Market House was built around 1730 and is said to have collapsed by 1736. It was located on Fair Hill, a radial road leading from the octagonal Market Place to the Fair Green. It was the product of Colonel Newburgh's innovative programme of urban planning, once considered an 'arched edifice built of brick.' It was rebuilt in 1837 but still retains some essential components of its original form.

=== Ballyhaise Bridge ===
Ballyhaise Bridge was built around 1710 by Colonel Brockhill Newburgh. It is made from roughly coursed limestone elevations which have elliptical arches having cut-stone arch rings. The bridge was positioned on a central axis with Ballyhaise House, which acts as a reminder of the formally laid out demesne. Its location across the Annalee River was a priority link between Cavan Town and County Monaghan. The new route enabled an accessible passage for goods in and out of the village.

=== Churches ===
==== St Mary's Catholic Church ====
This neo-Gothic sandstone parish church, often known locally as 'the Chapel', was originally built in Cavan Town c. 1823, later being significantly extended in 1853. The building was elevated to being the cathedral for the Catholic Diocese of Kilmore in 1862. When the new cathedral was completed in Cavan Town in 1942, the old cathedral was dismantled and largely re-erected, on a smaller scale, in nearby Ballyhaise as St Mary's Church. The 'new' church replaced an older and smaller T-plan chapel of c. 1810. The interior of St Mary's, when it was rebuilt, was very different from how it looked when it was a cathedral in Cavan Town, the new, much plainer 1940s interior being designed by W.H. Byrne & Sons. The sanctuary of the church was reordered in 2000. The church is located at the top of the Chapel Brae, on the main road connecting Ballyhaise with Cavan Town. It is a complex architectural structure that is important for the village.

==== Castletara Parish Church ====
Some parts of this Church of Ireland parish church may have been built in the seventeenth century, during the Plantation of Ulster. However, almost all of the present structure was built c. 1820, probably to a design by John Bowden, as a 'hall-and-tower' type church. The church, which is constructed of limestone rubble and dressed sandstone, was extended c. 1860, when a new transept was added to the south, a small vestry was added to the north, and a new bay was added to the east. The Romanesque windows in the main body of the church were refenestrated at this time. The church tower is largely in the Gothic style. The building is located midway between The Square, in the centre of Ballyhaise's planned village settlement, and the estate house.

== Transport ==
=== Bus ===
Local Link route C1 links the village with Cavan and Butlersbridge several times daily Mondays to Saturdays inclusive. Route C3 from Redhills to Cavan also serves the village with three services each way Mondays to Saturdays.

=== Rail ===
Ballyhaise railway station opened on 1 April 1862, closed for passenger traffic on 14 October 1957, and finally closed altogether on 1 January 1963.

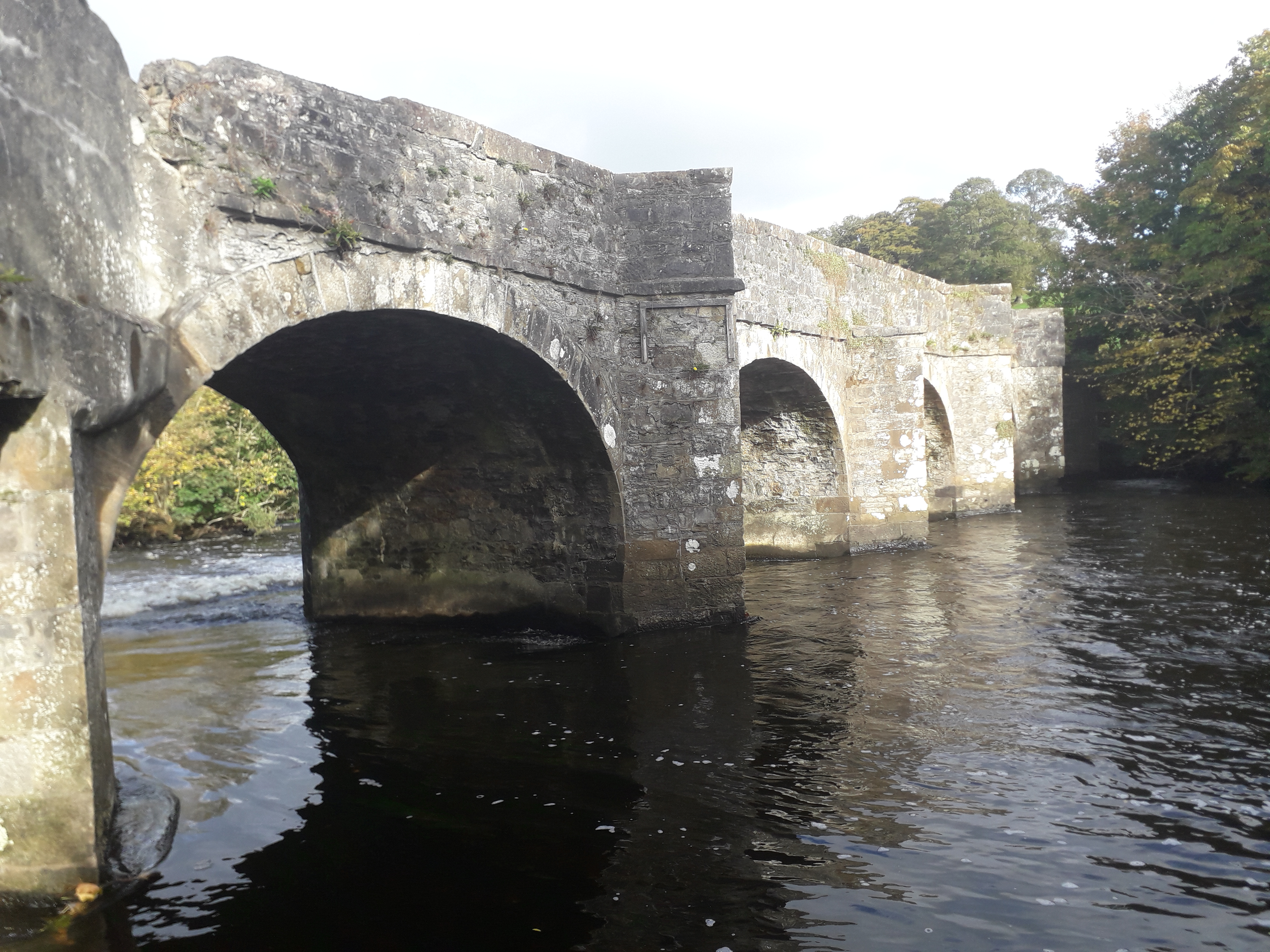
Ballyhaise Bridge

== Community and sporting groups ==
The village is home to Ballyhaise GAA, the local Gaelic football team, their home pitch being Annalee Park. In addition to this, the village was for many years home to Castletara Youth Band - an accordion marching band which won multiple All-Ireland titles in the late 1990s and early 21st century.

Ballyhaise Celtic Football Club was established in the village in 1990. Most recently they opened their home venue, Ballyhaise Celtic Park, located in Glenconnor, Ballyhaise. The club's senior team competes in the Cavan Monaghan Senior League and underage teams are fielded in the Cavan Monaghan Underage League.

== Weather station ==
Met Éireann records climate data for County Cavan from their station in Ballyhaise.

On 21 December 2010, the maximum temperature recorded in Ballyhaise was −9 °C and the minimum −14 °C (average for the day −12 °C). This was the lowest daily maximum temperature recorded on the island of Ireland since records began in the 1800s.

From Saturday 18 December to Christmas Day (25th) the temperature in Ballyhaise never exceeded −2 °C and fell to a minimum each day of between −11 °C and −15 °C.

Climate data for Ballyhaise, County Cavan
| Month | Jan | Feb | Mar | Apr | May | Jun | Jul | Aug | Sep | Oct | Nov | Dec | Year |
|---|---|---|---|---|---|---|---|---|---|---|---|---|---|
| Record high °C (°F) | 15 (59) | 16 (61) | 21 (70) | 22 (72) | 26 (79) | 29 (84) | 30 (86) | 28 (82) | 25 (77) | 20 (68) | 17 (63) | 14 (57) | 30 (86) |
| Mean daily maximum °C (°F) | 8.0 (46.4) | 7.7 (45.9) | 9.5 (49.1) | 11.8 (53.2) | 14.8 (58.6) | 17.2 (63.0) | 19.1 (66.4) | 18.7 (65.7) | 16.3 (61.3) | 12.9 (55.2) | 9.4 (48.9) | 7.6 (45.7) | 13.0 (55.4) |
| Mean daily minimum °C (°F) | 1.7 (35.1) | 1.9 (35.4) | 2.7 (36.9) | 3.7 (38.7) | 6.0 (42.8) | 10.6 (51.1) | 12.1 (53.8) | 11.7 (53.1) | 8.5 (47.3) | 6.4 (43.5) | 3.4 (38.1) | 2.5 (36.5) | 5.6 (42.1) |
| Record low °C (°F) | −9.9 (14.2) | −7 (19) | −6 (21) | −4 (25) | −1 (30) | 2 (36) | 5 (41) | 5 (41) | 1 (34) | −4 (25) | −6.4 (20.5) | −15.4 (4.3) | −15.4 (4.3) |
| Average precipitation mm (inches) | 78 (3.1) | 68 (2.7) | 66 (2.6) | 58 (2.3) | 57 (2.2) | 57 (2.2) | 59 (2.3) | 89 (3.5) | 58 (2.3) | 98 (3.9) | 68 (2.7) | 76 (3.0) | 832 (32.8) |
| Average precipitation days | 16 | 13 | 15 | 12 | 12 | 12 | 13 | 13 | 13 | 15 | 14 | 16 | 164 |
| Average snowy days | 2 | 3 | 2 | 1 | 0 | 0 | 0 | 0 | 0 | 0 | 0 | 2 | 10 |
| Average relative humidity (%) | 88 | 85 | 82 | 78 | 77 | 78 | 80 | 82 | 84 | 86 | 88 | 89 | 83 |
Source 1:
Source 2:

== Education ==
Ballyhaise College, an agricultural college, has been based at Ballyhaise House since the beginning of the 20th century. The college, now run by Teagasc, was established in 2006 and has over 400 enrolled students. The village has one primary school, Ballyhaise National School.

== Notable people ==
- Patrick Joseph Brady (also known as P.J. Brady; 1881 or 1882-1936), architect and engineer in the early twentieth century. Born and raised in County Cavan, from c. 1919 he lived at Broomfield House in the townland of Carrickmore, on the northern outskirts of Ballyhaise. He was married to Dr Catherine Brady (née O'Sullivan). His works include Belturbet Town Hall, which was built in the late 1920s. Upon his death, he was buried in Kill Old Cemetery.
- H.E. Seán Cardinal Brady (born 1939), Archbishop Emeritus of Armagh. Cardinal Brady served as the Catholic Lord Primate of All Ireland and Lord Archbishop of Armagh from 1996 until 2014. Born and raised in Drumcalpin, a townland in the Civil Parish of Larah, he served, when he was Monsignor Brady, as the Parish Priest of Castletara in the early 1990s, being based in Ballyhaise.
- Áine Cahill (born 1994), singer-songwriter who was raised near Ballyhaise.
- The Most Rev. Dr John Crozier (1853-1920), who served as Church of Ireland Lord Primate of All Ireland and Lord Archbishop of Armagh from 1911 until his death. Archbishop Crozier was born and raised at Rockview House at Knockfad, a townland on the western outskirts of Ballyhaise; Rockview House is in the part of Knockfad that overlooks 'The Rocks', a rural area between Knockfad and Butlersbridge. His father, The Rev. Baptist Barton Crozier (1807-1878), who was from a prominent family from the south-east of County Fermanagh, was the Church of Ireland rector in Ballyhaise at the time of the future Archbishop's birth.
- Seán Gallagher (born 1962), businessman who ran in both the 2011 and 2018 Irish presidential elections. Born in Monaghan Town, he spent most of his childhood and teenage years in Ballyhaise.
- Enda McGowan (1946-2022), played on both the Cavan Senior Gaelic football team and the Ballyhaise Senior Gaelic football team in the late 1960s and throughout the 1970s; later served as a selector for the Cavan County Board. A civil servant by profession, he was a native of Manorhamilton in County Leitrim. He initially played inter-county Gaelic football at Minor level, playing for his native Leitrim at this level. He moved to County Cavan as a young man, settling for many years in Ballyhaise.
- Colonel Brockhill Newburgh (c. 1659–1741), local landlord and MP for County Cavan in the Irish House of Commons. Colonel Newburgh had Ballyhaise redesigned and laid out as an estate village, probably in the early eighteenth century, and he also had both Ballyhaise House and Ballyhaise Bridge built.
- Lisa O'Neill (born 1982), folk singer, grew up in Ballyhaise.
- Faithful Teate (c. 1626-1666), poet and Puritan cleric. Probably born and raised in or near Ballyhaise during the Plantation of Ulster. He was the son of Dr Faithful Teate (d. 1660), the prominent Church of Ireland firebrand cleric who had been appointed Rector of Castleterra in 1625 and, in addition, Vicar of Drung in 1636; Faithful (Snr.), who was probably raised in County Wexford, had purchased lands in and around Ballyhaise during the Plantation of Ulster. The Teate family, including Faithful (Jnr.), had to flee from County Cavan during the 1641 Rebellion. Faithful (Jnr.) was the father of Nahum Tate (1652-1715), the Poet Laureate.

== See also ==
- List of towns and villages in the Republic of Ireland
- List of market houses in the Republic of Ireland
