= Áine Cahill =

Irish singer-songwriter

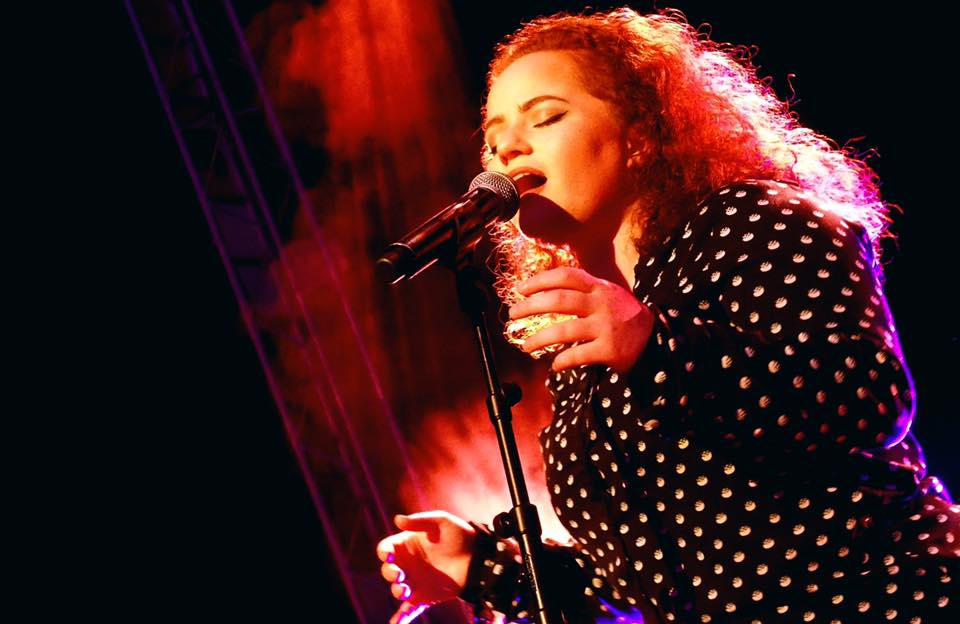
- Cahill performing at Eurosonic Noorderslag 2017

Background information
- Born: August 16, 1994 (age 31)
- Genres: Pop
- Occupations: Singer; songerwriter

Áine Cahill (born 16 August 1994) is a pop singer-songwriter from County Cavan, Ireland. She spent her childhood heavily involved with her local GAA club, Ballyhaise, then discovered her love of music at the age of 16. She is inspired by current music, citing Lady Gaga, Lana Del Rey and Marina and the Diamonds as her main influences but combines that with her love of classic Jazz from the 1950s. Cahills's unique sound and writing style captivates the listener; her storytelling evoking emotion and vivid imagery, allowing the audience to escape into her world.

Cahill independently recorded her debut EP Paper Crown throughout 2014 in JAM Studios, Kells, County Meath, with producer Martin Quinn. It was released that November digitally on SoundCloud only. It was later named 'Best Unsigned EP 2014' by U&I Magazine.

Following Paper Crown, Cahill released the single "Black Dahlia", inspired by Elisabeth Short and American Horror Story. The song was nominated by Hot Press Magazine for Best Track. Black Dahlia began to gain airplay on national radio, with the track being championed by Ian Dempsey on his TodayFM Breakfast Show. Dempsey later invited Cahill to do a live performance of the single. A video of the performance was posted online and racked up 70,000 views in one day. Cahill toured Ireland between September 2015 and June 2016, playing in iconic venues including Whelan's, Vicar Street, and Cork Opera House.

In June 2016, Cahill made her debut at Glastonbury, playing the Bread and Roses stage, where she was spotted by the BBC and asked to play an acoustic performance live on their Glastonbury TV coverage. Reaction was overwhelming with 'Aine Cahill' trending on Twitter. Following the Glastonbury success, she played three stunning sets at Electric Picnic. In December 2016, Áine joined fellow Irish musician's such as Kodaline, Picture This, and All Tvvins to play a sold-out 2FM XMas Ball in Dublin's 3Arena. The show raised €460,000 for the ISPCC. During the show, Cahill performed with the RTÉ National Concert Orchestra and was joined onstage by surprise guest Gavin James.

In 2017, Cahill was named 'One-to-Watch' in The Guardian and 'Breaking Act' in The Sunday Times Culture section. The same day, she announced that she is the voice behind the new TV3 Ireland ad campaign, singing a remarkable cover of "New World Coming". 13 January marked her first mainland European show, appearing at Eurosonic Noorderslag playing in Der Aa-Kerk. On 27 January, Cahill released her single "Plastic" via LAB Records, including her vocals backed with strings and beats. "Plastic" takes aim at a vacuous recipient, with Áine's tone shrouding her cutting words. The song received plays by Ian Dempsey (TodayFM), Jo Whiley (BBC Radio 2) and was playlisted on RTE 2FM. Áine Cahill won Best Single in 2017 for her song Plastic at the Pure M Awards
