= Drumcalpin =

Townland in County Cavan, Ireland

- Townland
- Location in Ireland
- Coordinates: 53°59′45″N 7°09′22″W
- Country: Ireland
- County: County Cavan

County Cavan highlighted in darker green

Drumcalpin is the name of three townlands in County Cavan, Ireland, with one situated in the civil parishes of Annagh, Castleterra, and Larah.

== Drumcalpin, Annagh ==
The townland of Drumcalpin in the civil parish of Annagh is in the electoral district of Carrafin. It is also situated in the former barony of Loughtee Lower (or Lower Loughtee). The townland covers 170 acres (0.69 km^{2}) and in the 1911 census of Ireland it had seven occupied houses and 41 inhabitants (21 males and 20 females).

== Drumcalpin, Castleterra ==
The townland of Drumcalpin in the civil parish of Castleterra is in the electoral district of Ballyhaise. It is also situated in the former barony of Castlerahan. The townland covers 215 acres (0.87 km^{2}) and in 1911 census of Ireland it had nine occupied houses and 37 inhabitants (20 males and 17 females).

== Drumcalpin, Larah ==
The townland of Drumcalpin in the civil parish of Larah is in the electoral district of Larah North (or Laradh North). It is also situated in the former barony of Tullygarvey. The townland covers 332 acres (1.34 km^{2}) and in the 1911 census of Ireland it had thirteen occupied houses and 61 inhabitants (35 males and 26 females).

Among the notable people from Drumcalpin is His Eminence Seán Cardinal Brady (born 1939), who served as the Archbishop of Armagh, Primate of All Ireland, and head of the Catholic Church in Ireland from 1996 to 2014, and who was created a cardinal in 2007.
