= James Somers =

Irish Victoria Cross recipient (1894–1918)

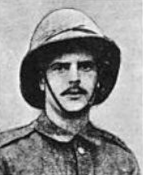
- Born: 12 June 1894; Belturbet, County Cavan, Ireland
- Died: 7 May 1918 (aged 23); Modreeny, Ireland
- Military career
- Allegiance: United Kingdom
- Branch: British Army
- Service years: 1913–1918
- Rank: Sergeant
- Service number: 10512
- Unit: Royal Inniskilling Fusiliers
- Conflicts: World War I: Great Retreat; Gallipoli campaign; Western Front
- Awards: Victoria Cross

Sergeant James Somers VC (12 June 1894 – 7 May 1918) was an Irish recipient of the Victoria Cross, the highest and most prestigious award for gallantry in the face of the enemy that can be awarded to British and Commonwealth forces.

== Biography ==
Somers was born in Belturbet, County Cavan on 12 June 1894. He was 21 years old, and a sergeant in the 1st Battalion, Royal Inniskilling Fusiliers, British Army during the First World War when the following deed took place for which he was awarded the VC.

On 1/2 July 1915, in Gallipoli, Turkey, when, owing to hostile bombing, some of his troops had retired from a sap, Sergeant Somers remained alone there until a party brought up bombs. He then climbed over into the Turkish trench and bombed the Turks with great effect. Later on, he advanced into the open under heavy fire and held back the enemy by throwing bombs into their flank until a barricade had been established. During this period, he frequently ran to and from his trenches to obtain fresh supplies of bombs.

In a letter to his father, Somers wrote:

I beat the Turks out of our trench single-handed and had four awful hours at night. The Turks swarmed in from all roads, but I gave them a rough time of it, still holding the trench. It is certain sure we are beating the Turks all right. In the trench I came out of, it was shocking to see the dead. They lay, about three thousand Turks, in front of our trenches, and the smell was absolutely chronic. You know when the sun has been shining on those bodies for three or four days it makes a horrible smell; a person would not mind if it was possible to bury them. But no, you dare not put your nose outside the trench, and if you did, you would be a dead man.

He had previously been severely wounded during the Retreat from Mons in August 1914.

Later in the war, Somers served with the Army Service Corps on the Western Front. He died on 7 May 1918 (aged 24) leaving behind his parents, wife and son, and was buried with full military honours in Modreeny Church of Ireland cemetery. His Union Jack-draped coffin was carried on a gun carriage, led by the Pipe Band of the Cameron Highlanders. His headstone states simply: "He stood and defended. The Lord wrought a great wonder."
