= Erne Palais Ballroom =

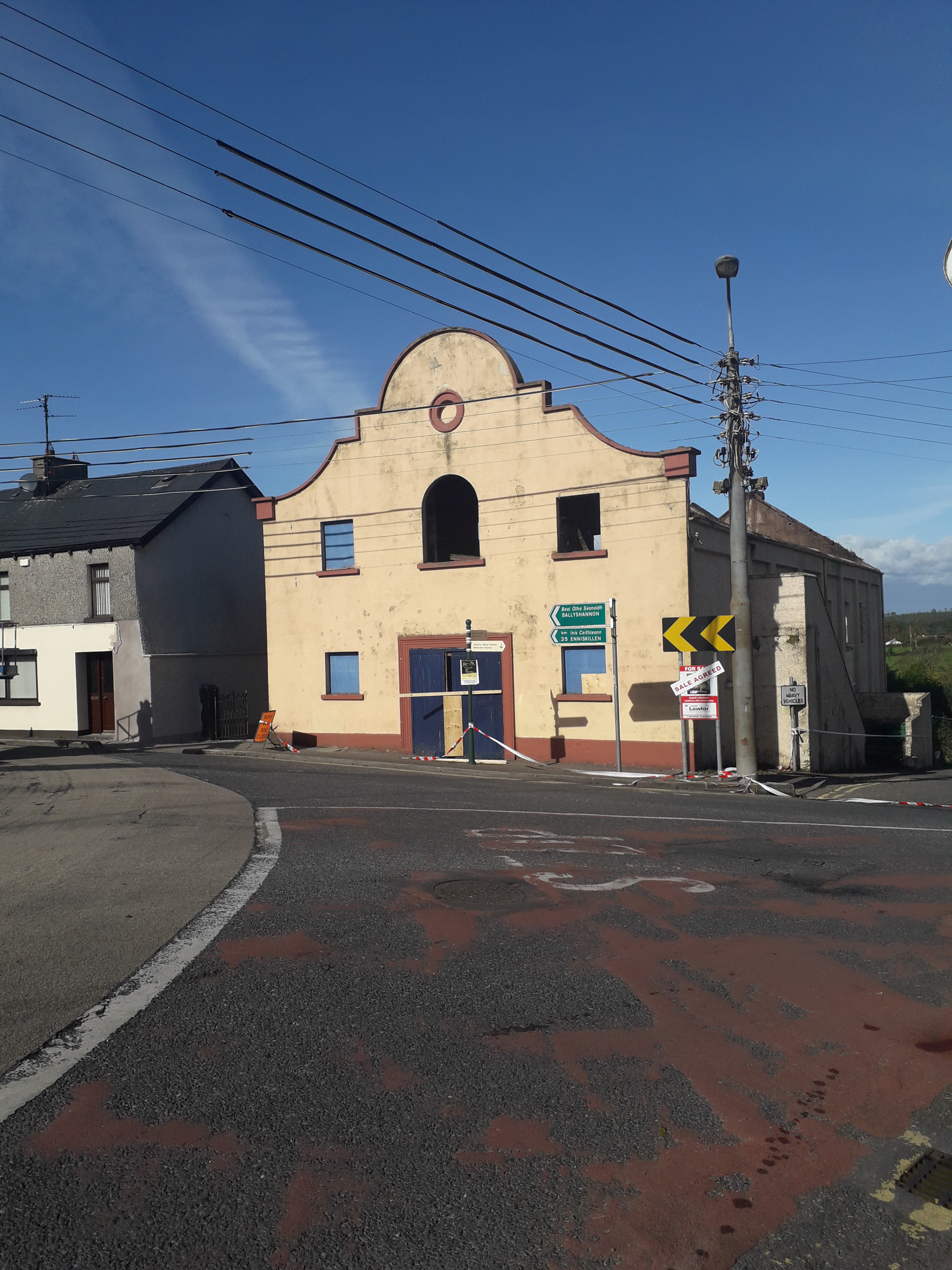
- Erne Palais Ballroom in September 2018
- Interactive map of Erne Palais Ballroom
- Former names: The Erne Cinema
- Coordinates: 54.10244°N 7.44052°W

Construction
- Built: 1944-1947
- Opened: 1947
- Renovated: 1963

Erne Palais Ballroom was an Irish ballroom in Belturbet, County Cavan.

== History ==
The Erne Palais Ballroom was originally built as The Erne Cinema in the town of Belturbet, County Cavan in 1947. It was a cinema until 1963, when it was sold to Tom and Michael Corrigan. They installed a Canadian maple wooden floor, and opened the building as the Erne Palais Ballroom on Thursday 10 October 1963 with the band the Mighty Avons playing. After a number of years as a successful ballroom, the building was sold in 1979 and became the Palais Community Centre. As a community centre it still played host to local dances. At some point after the 1980s, the building fell into disuse. There were plans to demolish the site in 2007, which did not go ahead.

On 24 September 2018, the building caught fire and was gutted. Due to the roof being constructed from asbestos, a special clean up was commenced in the days after the fire.

== Building features ==
The building had a pitched corrugated asbestos roof with a chimney. The front gable is smooth rendered, with a semi-circular apex over square shoulders, concave curves ending over rectangular blocks. The front gable also features a blind oculus over a rounded central first floor window.
