= Belturbet =

Town in County Cavan, Ulster, Ireland

Belturbet Béal Tairbirt
- Town
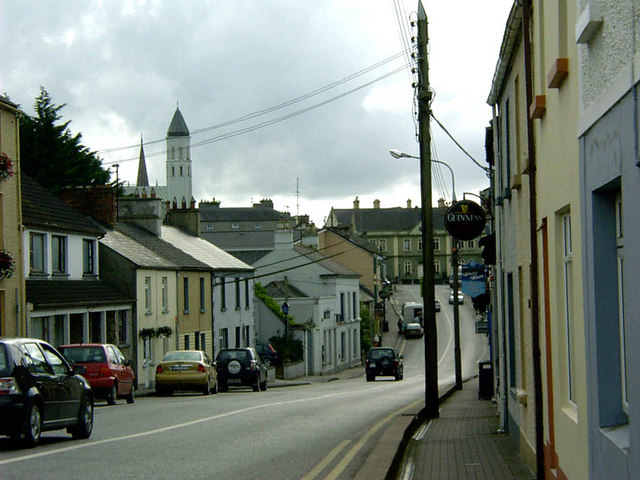
- Main Street

- Location in Ireland
- Coordinates: 54°06′N 7°27′W
- Country: Ireland
- Province: Ulster
- County: County Cavan
- Barony: Loughtee Lower
- Elevation: 57 m (187 ft)

Population (2022)
  - Total: 1,610
- Time zone: UTC±0 (WET)
  - Summer (DST): UTC+1 (IST)
- Eircode routing key: H14
- Telephone area code: +353(0)49
- Irish Grid Reference: H361168

Historical population
Year	Pop.	±%
1821	2,010	—
1831	2,026	+0.8%
1841	2,070	+2.2%
1851	2,054	−0.8%
1861	1,789	−12.9%
1871	1,759	−1.7%
1881	1,807	+2.7%
1891	1,675	−7.3%
1901	1,587	−5.3%
1911	1,371	−13.6%
1926	1,307	−4.7%
1936	1,341	+2.6%
1946	1,179	−12.1%
1951	1,152	−2.3%
1956	1,176	+2.1%
1961	1,093	−7.1%
1966	1,100	+0.6%
1971	1,092	−0.7%
1981	1,138	+4.2%
1986	1,228	+7.9%
1991	1,223	−0.4%
1996	1,248	+2.0%
2002	1,295	+3.8%
2006	1,411	+9.0%
2011	1,407	−0.3%
2016	1,369	−2.7%
2022	1,610	+17.6%

Belturbet (/bɛlˈtɜːrbət/; Irish: Béal Tairbirt, meaning 'mouth of the isthmus') is a town in County Cavan, Ireland. It lies on the N3 road, around 14 km (8.7 mi) north of Cavan town and 123 km (76 mi) from Dublin. It is also located around 4 km (2.5 mi) south of the border with County Fermanagh, part of Northern Ireland, and is 36 km (22 mi) from Enniskillen. As of the 2022 census, the population was 1,610.

Butler Street, the town's main street, leads to The Diamond, the town square, where all of Belturbet's important buildings are situated or are close to. Both the Church of Ireland church and the Catholic church (often known locally as 'the Chapel') dominate the skyline of the town.

== History ==
Belturbet's location is historically one of the best places for crossing the River Erne. When the Anglo-Normans tried to conquer in the early 13th century, Walter de Lacy built a motte-and-bailey on Turbet Island (an island in the Erne). The fort was probably made of wood and has not survived although the steep mound of earth where it was built can still be seen.

Belturbet was the capital of the Kingdom of East Breifne which was an historic kingdom of Ireland roughly corresponding to County Cavan that existed from 1256 to 1607. In the late 16th century the local O'Reilly chieftains built a castle opposite Turbet Island, but this has not survived.

As part of the Plantation of Ulster in the early 17th century, the lands around Belturbet were granted to the English "undertaker" Sir Stephen Butler (the ancestor of the Earls of Lanesborough). He soon established a thriving urban centre, whose prosperity relied heavily on its position on the Erne. Butler Street, the town's main street, leads to The Diamond, the town square, where all of the town's important buildings are either situated or close to. The Church of Ireland church dominates the skyline; some of it dates from the early 17th century, and it was one of the first Anglican churches built in Ireland, reputedly using materials from Drumlane Abbey.

The town was seized by the Irish during the Irish Rebellion of 1641, and was the site of one of the massacres of planters, in which over two dozen people were thrown from the town's bridge and drowned. Following the death of Owen Roe O'Neill commander of the Confederate Ulster army, a meeting at Belturbet on 18 March 1650 appointed the inexperienced Heber MacMahon, Catholic Bishop of Clogher, in his place. In March 1653, under Viscount Magennis of Iveagh, it was the last town in Ireland to fall to Cromwell; the final Irish stronghold at nearby Cloughoughter held out for a further month.

Belturbet acquired an English garrison in the late 17th century. Many of the original fortifications are in good repair. The proto-Quaker leader, William Edmundson, was detained in Belturbet in the 1650s, and put in the stocks.

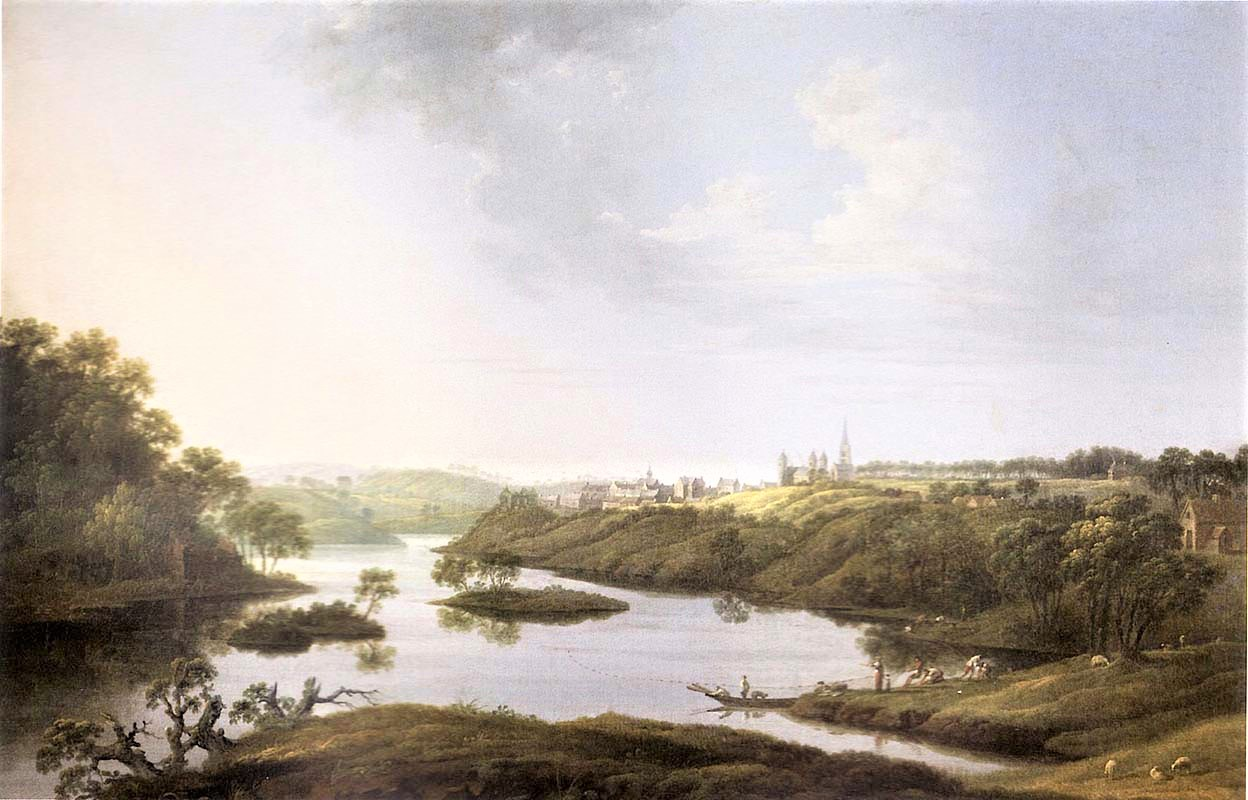
A view of Belturbet (1771), Thomas Roberts

In 1689, during the Williamite War, Lord Tyrconnell promoted the writer Antoine Hamilton major-general sending his army north to Belturbet to fight the rebels of Enniskillen. In the battle of Newtownbutler, in July, Hamilton commanded the horse. The outcome would show that he was "better with his pen than with his sword".

The Irish Parliament constituency of Belturbet was represented in the Irish House of Commons from 1611 to 1800. It was a rotten borough in the control of the Earl of Lanesborough. Under the Penal Laws, between 1725 and 1793 Catholics and those married to Catholics could not vote.

The church was damaged by lightning in the 1720s.

John Wesley passed through in 1760, and noted

a town in which there is neither Papist nor Presbyterian; but, to supply that defect there are, Sabbath-breakers, drunkards, and common swearers in abundance.

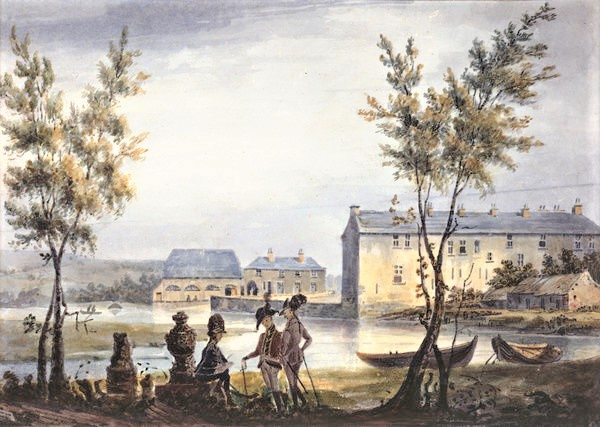
A view of Belturbet (c.1790), John Nixon

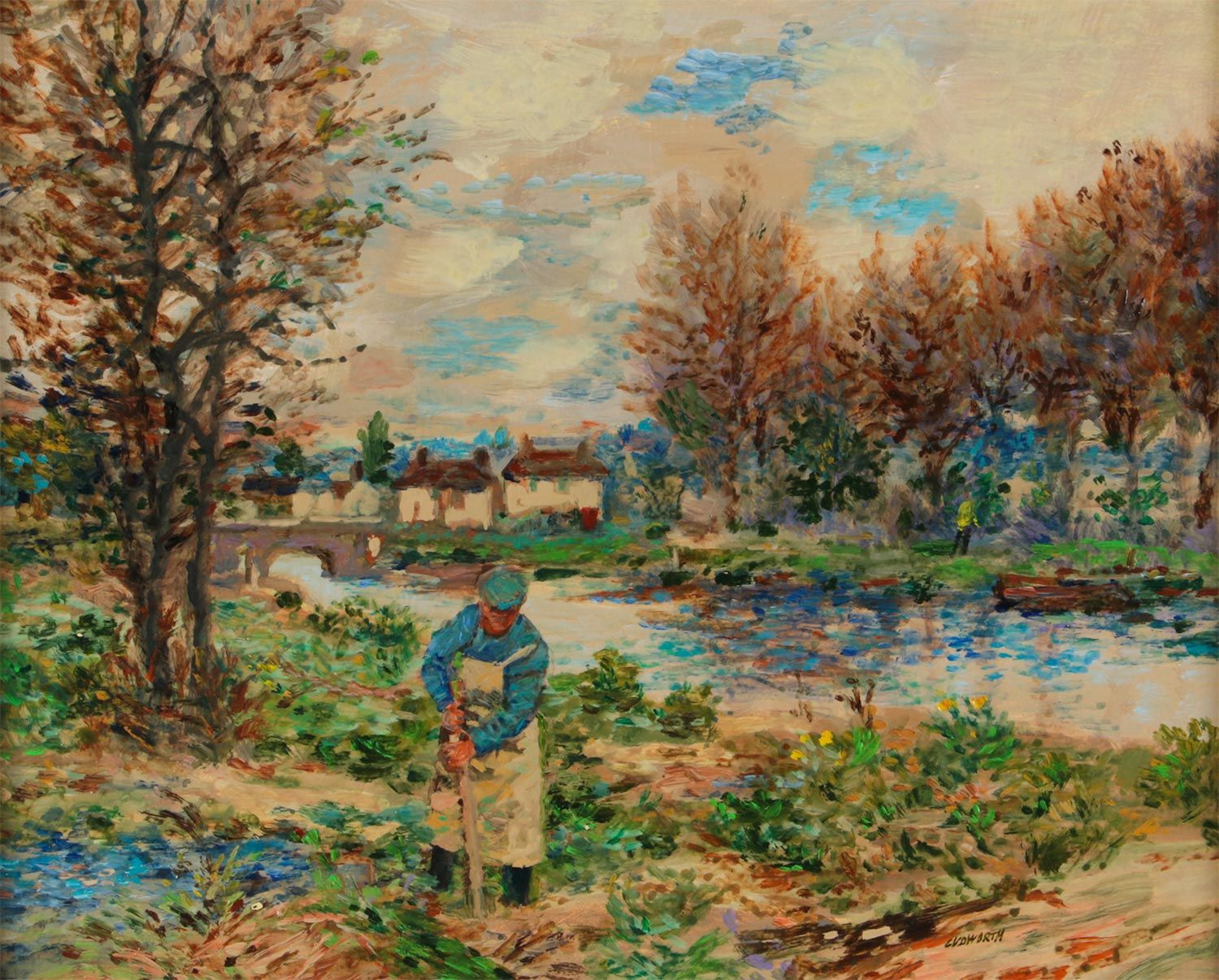
20th century painting of the bridge over the Erne

Two young people, Geraldine O'Reilly, from Staghall, Belturbet, and Patrick Stanley, from Clara, County Offaly, were killed by a Loyalist car bomb in Belturbet on 28 December 1972.

== Education ==
The town has three primary schools, including St. Mary's BNS (a male primary school for second class up to sixth class), Fairgreen National School (a mixed-gender Church of Ireland school, and Convent of Mercy National School (educating boys up to first class and girls up to sixth class).

The town's only secondary school is St Bricins Vocational School, a vocational school run by the Cavan & Monaghan ETB.

== Transport ==
=== Rail transport ===
The railway station was opened on 29 June 1885 for the Great Northern Railway (Ireland) connecting to the broad gauge branch to Ballyhaise railway station on the Clones to Cavan line. It also served the narrow gauge Cavan and Leitrim Railway to Dromod and Arigna, for which it opened on 24 October 1887. The station finally closed for all services on 1 April 1959.

Belturbet railway station is a railway museum.

=== Coach/ bus transport ===
Bus Éireann Expressway Route 30, jointly operated with McGeehan Coaches. This bus route links Dublin with Donegal providing several stops per day. This bus runs several times daily. Also, Ulsterbus Route 58 from Enniskillen has its terminus in the town. The bus stop is located outside the former post office on the Diamond (for Cavan/Dublin-bound services it is on the opposite side of the road). Leydons Coaches operate route 930 linking the town to Cavan, Ballyconnell, Bawnboy, Swanlinbar and Enniskillen.

=== Roads ===
The Staghall to Drumaloor section of the N3 Belturbet Bypass opened on 2 August 2013. The remainder to the south opened on 13 December 2013.

The Peace Bridge, spans the Woodford River and carries the A509 / N3 road linking the town to Enniskillen in County Fermanagh. The old bridge was destroyed in November 1972 by Ulster Loyalists. No paramilitary group ever claimed responsibility. Following the Belturbet bombing the British Government decided to leave the bridge in a state of disrepair and demolish the temporary structure erected. The lack of a crossing cut off access to farmland in southern Fermanagh from Belturbet. Local traffic had to undertake a 12-mile (19 km) detour, severing communities and leading to economic decline in the area, with many businesses in Belturbet closing.

== Economy ==
Economic contributors to the town include its retail, service and tourist industries. There is a business park to the north east of the town and smaller employers within the town itself. Tourism facilities include fishing, boat cruising, the local railway station and country walks. The town has its own festival, Belturbet Festival Of The Erne, which also includes the Lady Of the Erne competition. Employment for most of the locals is in Cavan town, Ballyconnell or other nearby areas. The town has a farmers mart every Friday afternoon.

== Sport ==
Belturbet has a local GAA club, Belturbet Rory O'Moores.

== Arts ==
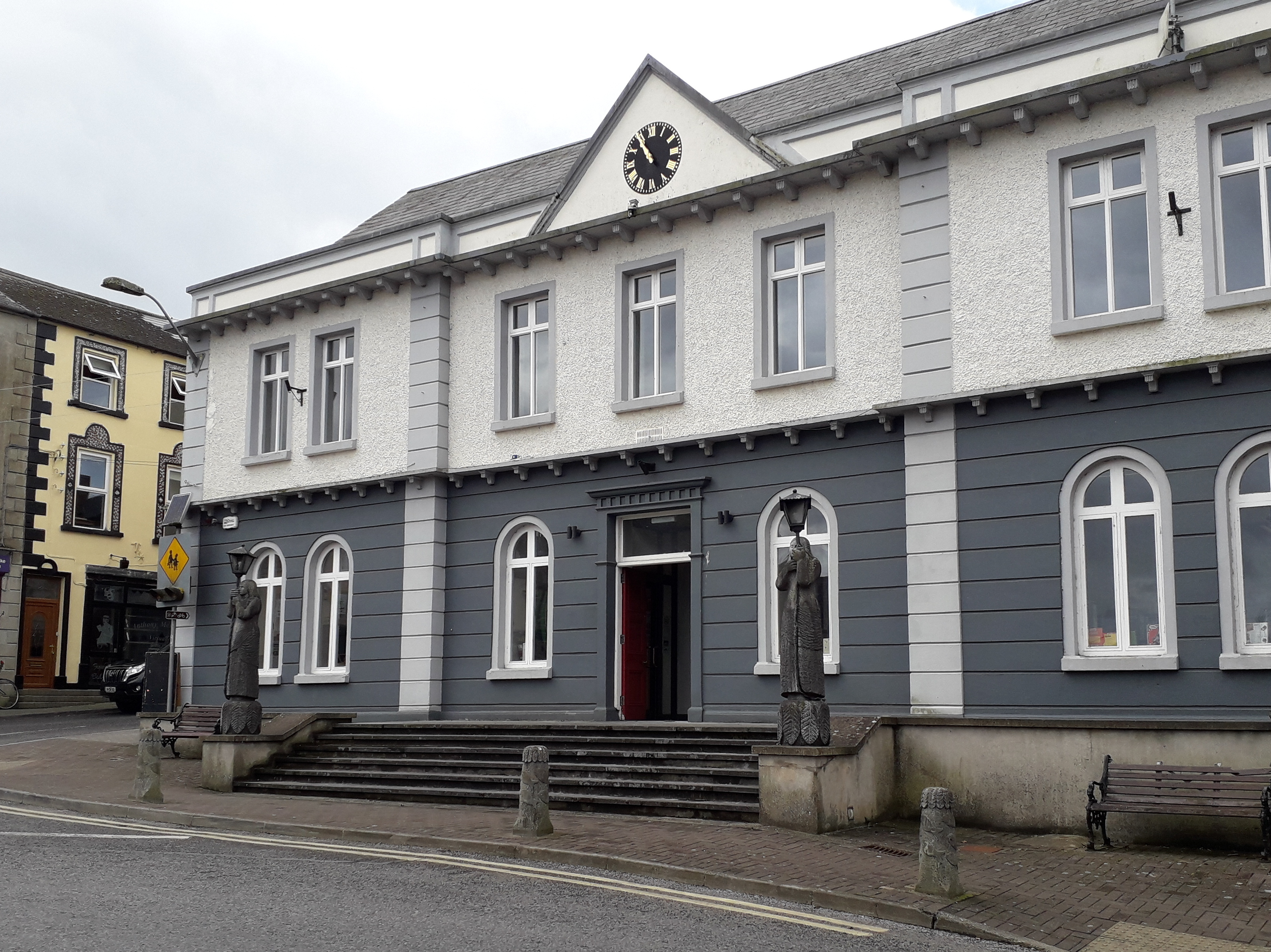
Belturbet Town Hall

The Erne Palais Ballroom is one of the buildings in the town listed by the National Inventory of Architectural Heritage. Another, Belturbet Town Hall, was completed in 1928.

From 1893 to 1931, Shan Fadh Bullock wrote 14 novels set in the Cavan-Fermanagh borderland, renaming Belturbet "Bunn" for his books. Belturbet is also mentioned in James Joyce's 1922 novel Ulysses, in the fifteenth episode, Circe. The reference comes from Cissy Caffrey, who says: 'More luck to me. Cavan, Cootehill and Belturbet'.

== Philately ==
Irish stamp collectors consider the most important prestigious postal cover sent abroad from Ireland to be one from Belturbet posted to Spain on 27 April 1841.

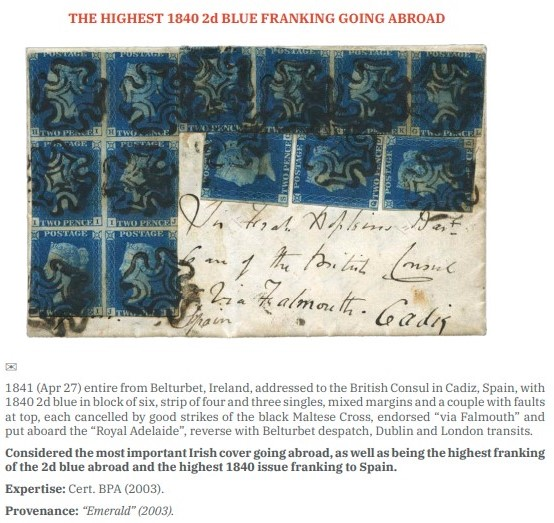
1841 (Apr 27) entire from Belturbet, Ireland, addressed to the British Consul in Cadiz, Spain

== Notable people ==
- Brendan Perry (born 1959), composer and singer with Dead Can Dance, lives in the vicinity of the town.
- James Somers (1894–1918), soldier who won the Victoria Cross during the First World War was from Belturbet.
- Andrew Grene (1965–2010), a civil affairs officer with the United Nations who grew up in the area, was killed in the 2010 Haiti earthquake and later buried in Belturbet churchyard.

== See also ==
- List of towns and villages in Ireland

== Bibliography ==
- Boulger, Demetrius Charles (1911). The Battle of the Boyne. London: Martin Secker. OCLC 1041056932.
- Clark, Ruth (1921). Anthony Hamilton: his Life and Works and his Family. London: John Lane. OCLC 459281163.
- Hamilton, Lord Ernest (1920). The Irish Rebellion of 1641 with a History of the Events that Led up to and Succeeded it. London: John Murray. OCLC 1047522860.
- Hogan, James (1934). Négociations de M. Le Comte d'Avaux en Irlande 1689–1690 [Negotiations of the Count d'Avaux in Ireland] (in French). Dublin: Stationery Office. OCLC 230600157.
