= Larah =

Civil parish in County Cavan, Ireland

Coordinates: 53.993°N 7.215°W

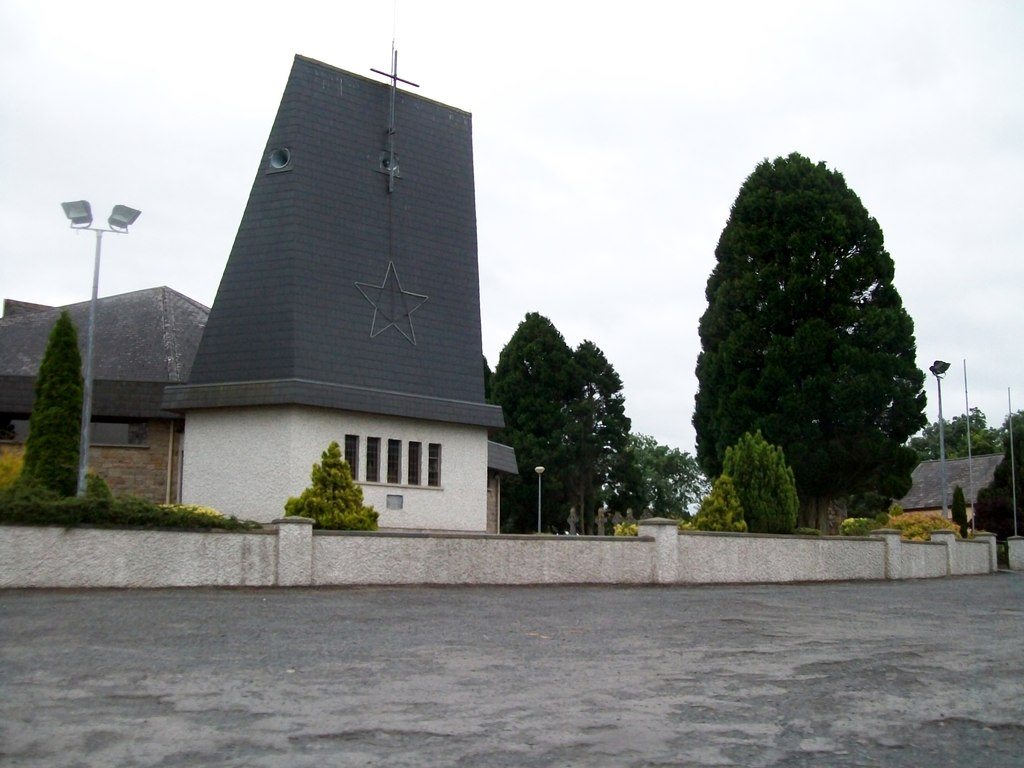
St Brigids Roman Catholic chapel in Laragh

Larah or Laragh (Irish: Leathráth) is a civil parish and townland in County Cavan, Ireland. The principal village in the civil parish is Stradone which is located 1 km from the N3 national road. Laragh is an ecclesiastical parish in the Roman Catholic Diocese of Kilmore. There are three churches in the parish namely in Larah, Clifferna and Carrickallen. There are two national schools, at Larah and Clifferna, respectively.

== Sport ==
Laragh United Gaelic Football Club was formed in 1973 by the amalgamation of two clubs; Laragh (Junior) and Stradone (Intermediate). In 1972 these clubs joined forces for the Senior Championship as a group team called St. Brigid's. They reached the final and were beaten by Crosserlough. The officers and players of both clubs decided afterwards to amalgamate both clubs, and in 1973 the new club was affiliated as Laragh United and entered in the Senior and Junior competitions. The new club won several underage competitions, including three U-16 leagues, three Minor leagues, three Minor championships (group team with the club's neighbours Lavey). The club's record in Senior, Junior and U-21's included several wins in U-21 and Junior championships.

The club won senior league competitions on five occasions. In 1979 Laragh Utd. won their first Senior championship by defeating Crosserlough in the final, after only being in existence for six years. Laragh United went on to win the senior championship in 1982, 1983 and 1984. The 1984 final was played in Ballyconnell, as this was the Centenary year of the G.A.A. In the same year, Laragh Utd won the Ulster 7-a-side competition. This competition was played to celebrate the Centenary year. In later years, Laragh United has not had much success at Senior Level, but has won the U-12 league in 2002 and was narrowly beaten by Belturbet in the U-13 championship.

The club has consistently provided players to the Cavan county football team.

== Notable people ==
People from Laragh include Dr. Seán Brady, a native of Drumcalpin, who served as Archbishop of Armagh, Primate of All Ireland, and head of the Catholic Church in Ireland from 1996 until 2014, being elevated to the cardinalate in 2007.
