= Belturbet Town Hall =

Municipal building in Belturbet, County Cavan, Ireland

- Halla an Bhaile Béal Tairbirt
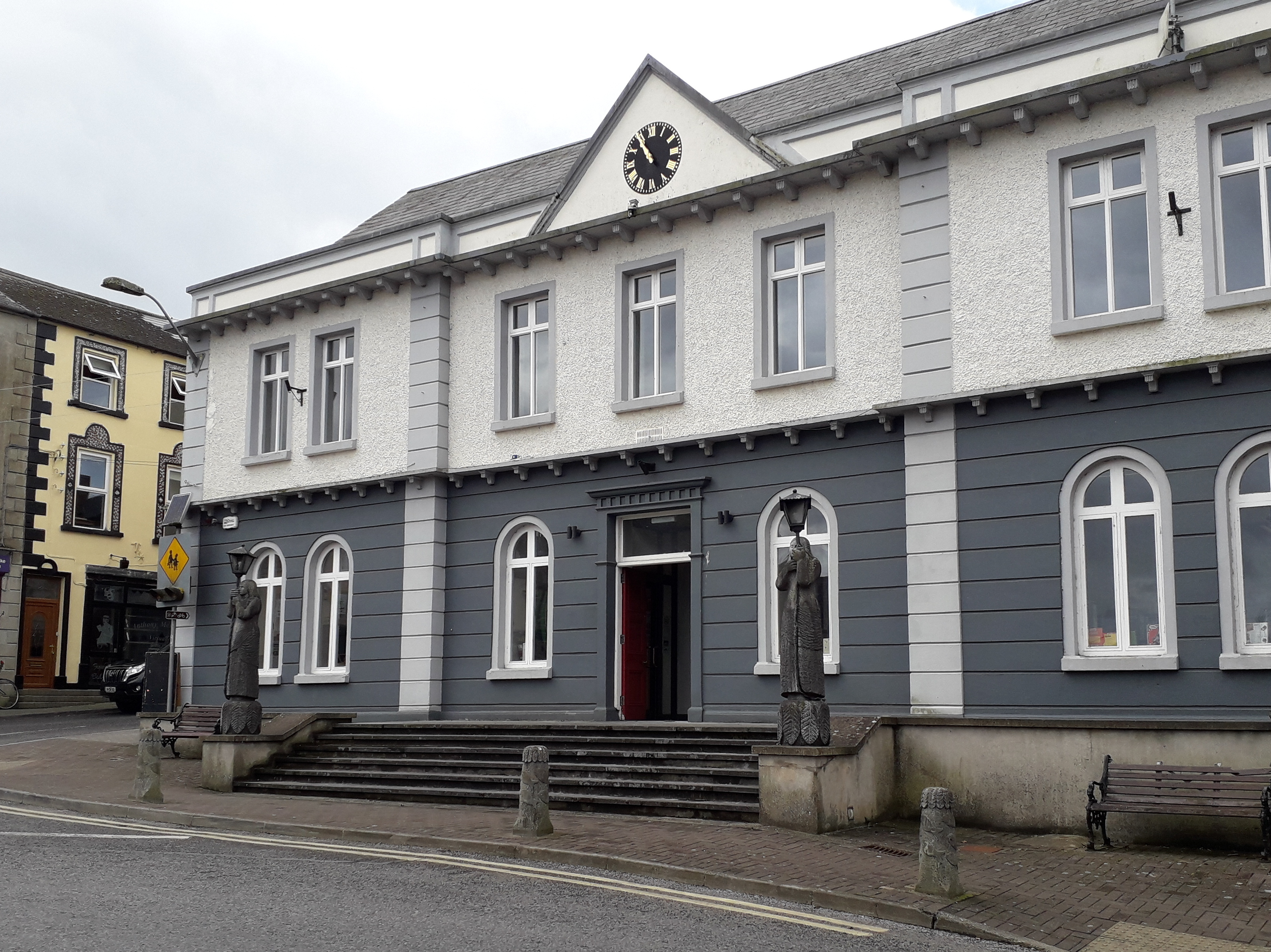
- Belturbet Town Hall

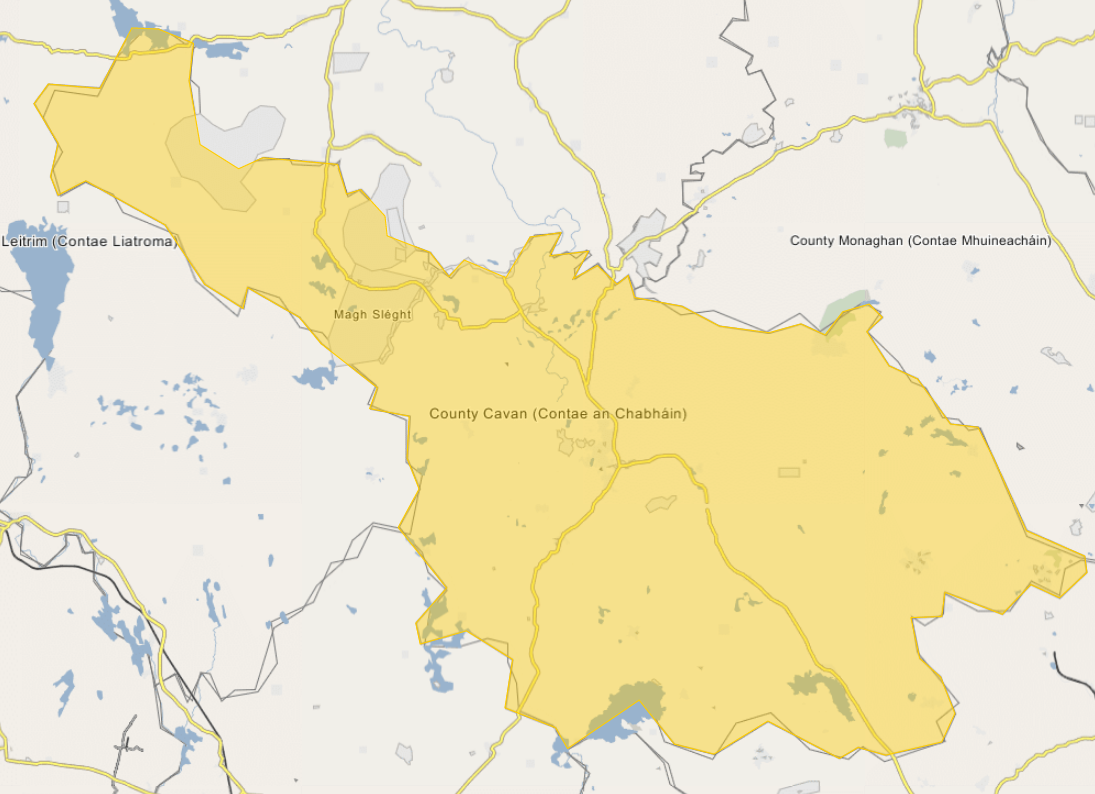
- Location within County Cavan

General information
- Architectural style: Neoclassical style
- Location: The Diamond, Belturbet, Ireland
- Coordinates: 54.1004°N 7.4452°W
- Completed: 1928

Design and construction
- Architect: Patrick Joseph Brady

Belturbet Town Hall (Irish: Halla an Bhaile Béal Tairbirt) is a municipal building in The Diamond in Belturbet, County Cavan, Ireland. It is currently used as a community centre and as a library.

== History ==
The first municipal building in the town was a market house which may have dated back to the Plantation of Ulster in the early 17th century. It was arcaded on the ground floor, so that markets could be held, with an assembly room, used for meetings of the corporation, on the first floor. It had a jail in the basement and a tall belfry in the centre of the roof. In March 1689, during the Williamite War in Ireland, two Williamite officers, Captain Wolstan Dixie, who was the son of Edward Dixie, the Dean of Kilmore, and Lieutenant William Charleton, were captured and executed on the orders of the 3rd Viscount Galmoye, the Jacobite leader, and their severed heads were placed on the roof of the market house. The corporation of Belturbet was dissolved under the Municipal Corporations (Ireland) Act 1840.

By the early 20th century, the market house was dilapidated and the town commissioners decided to demolish it and to erect a town hall on the site. The new building was designed by Patrick Joseph Brady in the neoclassical style, built in brick with panelling on the ground floor and a cement render finish on the first floor, and was completed in 1928.

The design involved a symmetrical main frontage of seven bays facing onto The Diamond. The central bay featured a doorway flanked by pilasters supporting an entablature. The other bays on the ground floor were fenestrated by small round headed windows, while all the bays on the first floor were fenestrated by tall square headed windows. The central section of three bays, which was slightly recessed, and the outer sections of two bays each were flanked by full height pilasters supporting a modillioned cornice and a parapet. There was a small central pediment, with a clock in the tympanum, over the central bay.

The building continued to serve as a community events venue for much of the 20th century. However, by the early 21st century, although the building was being used by the Convent of Mercy National School and other organisations for auditions and dancing classes, the fabric of the building was in a poor condition and the floors were dangerous.

An extensive programme of refurbishment works, which involved accommodating a community centre and a new library, was subsequently undertaken. The works also involved the creation of a new curved glass extension, intended to encase some medieval foundations, which were discovered at the rear of the building. The works were carried out by J. J. McCauley to a design by Gaffney & Cullivan and financed by the International Fund for Ireland, the Department for the Environment, Community and Local Government and Cavan County Council. The community centre was intended to commemorate the lives of Geraldine O'Reilly, from Belturbet, and Patrick Stanley, from Clara, who were killed by a Loyalist car bomb in Belturbet on 28 December 1972. After the works had been completed the building was re-opened by the Minister for the Environment, Community and Local Government, Phil Hogan, in June 2014.
