= List of people from Derry =

This is a list of notable people who were born or have lived in Derry, Northern Ireland.

== Actors ==
- Amanda Burton – actress, best known for her role as forensic pathologist Doctor (later Professor) "Sam Ryan" in the BBC crime drama series Silent Witness
- Antonia Campbell-Hughes – actress whose films and shows include Kelly + Victor and Lead Balloon
- Roma Downey – actress, film producer and author, best known for her role as Monica, the main character of the religious TV series Touched by an Angel
- Michelle Fairley – actress, best known for her role as Catelyn Stark in the TV series Game of Thrones
- George Farquhar – Restoration dramatist
- Bronagh Gallagher – actress/singer whose films include Pulp Fiction and The Commitments
- Saoirse-Monica Jackson – actress whose work includes Derry Girls
- Jamie-Lee O'Donnell – actress whose work includes Derry Girls

== Artists ==
- Willie Doherty – visual artist twice nominated for the Turner Prize
- Eilis O'Connell – sculptor
- Pádraig Timoney – visual artist

== Authors ==
- James Burke – Science Historian and TV figure
- Willie Carson – photo journalist and author
- Joyce Cary – author; two of his novels were made into films: The Horse's Mouth (1958) starring Sir Alec Guinness and Mister Johnson (1990)
- Seamus Deane – writer
- Richard Doherty – Catholic Unionist/Royal Ulster Constabulary reservist, writer, military historian
- Seamus Heaney – poet, writer and lecturer; awarded the Nobel Prize in Literature in 1995
- Nell McCafferty – journalist, playwright, civil rights campaigner and feminist
- Eamonn McCann – journalist, civil rights campaigner, socialist and former MLA for the city
- Aoife Moore – journalist, political correspondent with the Irish Examiner

== Military ==
- John Lawrence, soldier and Viceroy of India
- Edward Leach, recipient of the Victoria Cross
- John Park, recipient of the Victoria Cross
- Miles Ryan, recipient of the Victoria Cross

== Musicians ==
- Máiréad Carlin – member of Celtic Woman
- Phil Coulter – songwriter who wrote The Town I Loved So Well
- Nadine Coyle – singer from Girls Aloud
- Peter Cunnah – lead singer with 1990s pop outfit D Ream
- Dana – winner of the Eurovision Song Contest in 1970
- Neil Hannon – lead singer of The Divine Comedy
- Keith Harkin – singer and songwriter from Celtic Thunder
- Josef Locke – tenor singer, popular in the 1940s and 1950s
- Damian McGinty – tenor singer in Celtic Thunder
- Paul McLoone- Former Today FM DJ and current frontman of The Undertones
- Jimmy McShane of Baltimora
- Cahir O'Doherty – member of Fighting with Wire, Jetplane Landing and Seafood
- Feargal Sharkey – lead singer of The Undertones
- SOAK – singer/songwriter

== Politicians ==
- Martina Anderson – Sinn Féin Member of the Legislative Assembly (MLA) for Foyle
- David Baird Sr. – United States Senator from New Jersey who was born in Derry before emigrating to the U.S.
- Gregory Campbell – Democratic Unionist Party Member of Parliament for East Londonderry
- Nigel Dodds – Democratic Unionist Party Member of Parliament for Belfast North
- Brendan Duddy – Local business man and key figure in the Northern Ireland Peace Process.
- Mark Durkan – Social Democratic and Labour Party (SDLP) and former Member of Parliament for Foyle
- Colum Eastwood – Social Democratic and Labour Party (SDLP) Leader and Member of Parliament for Foyle and Former Mayor of Derry City and former MLA for Foyle.
- William Hay – Democratic Unionist Party, Speaker of the Northern Assembly & MLA for Foyle
- John Hume – Nobel Peace Prize and Gandhi Peace Prize recipient, former leader of the Social Democratic and Labour Party, and MP for Foyle 1983–2005
- Elisha McCallion – Sinn Féin Senator for the Industrial and Commercial Panel
- Martin McGuinness – Deputy First Minister of Northern Ireland and Sinn Féin MP for Mid Ulster

== Scientists ==
- Raphael Armattoe – runner up of the 1948 Nobel Prize in Physiology or Medicine – physiologist
- William C. Campbell – winner of the 2015 Nobel Prize in Physiology or Medicine – biologist and parasitologist
- J. A. Scott Kelso – neuroscientist
- William Taylor Whan – botanist

== Sportspeople ==
- Liam Ball – Olympic swimmer
- Trevor Britton – cricketer
- Daniel Collins - rower and Irish indoor rowing champion
- John "Jobby" Crossan – footballer, capped 24 times by Northern Ireland, scoring 10 goals
- John Duddy – retired boxer, former holder of the IBA World Middleweight Title and the WBC Continental Americas Middleweight Title
- Darron Gibson – retired footballer, former Republic of Ireland international and Everton F.C. midfielder; first man from Derry to represent the Republic of Ireland national football team
- Ken Goodall – rugby union and league player, capped 19 times by Ireland; was selected as a replacement for the 1968 Lions tour to South Africa; changed codes and joined rugby league side Workington
- Billy "Spider" Kelly – boxer, former Commonwealth (British Empire) featherweight and British featherweight champion.
- Jude McAtamney — American football placekicker
- James McClean – Wigan Athletic F.C. midfielder
- Paddy McCourt – Former Celtic F.C. midfielder
- Gerry McElhinney – former gaelic footballer with Derry and association football with Bolton Wanderers, Plymouth Argyle, Peterborough United and Northern Ireland.
- Dwayne McGerrigle – cricketer
- Fred McMullan – former professional darts player
- Charlie Nash – boxer, former European and British lightweight champion
- Martin O'Neill – OBE recipient, former manager of Celtic Football Club, and Aston Villa F.C.
- Daryl Gurney – Professional Dart Player. 2 Times PDC Major Winner
- Barry Molloy – Retired Professional Footballer.

== Other ==
- Adam Beales, YouTuber and television presenter
- Mark McFadden, television journalist
- Lisa McGee, stage and screenwriter
- Eileen O'Donnell, model and beauty pageant winner
- William Sampson, lawyer
