= John Keys O'Doherty =

The Most Reverend Bishop John Keys O'Doherty
- Roman Catholic Diocese of Derry
- Church: Catholic Church
- Diocese: Derry
- In office: 1889–1907; (died)
- Predecessor: Francis Kelly
- Successor: Charles McHugh
- Previous post: Parish Priest Strabane

Orders
- Ordination: 4 August 1861
- Consecration: 2 March 1890 by Michael Logue

Personal details
- Born: 25 September 1833 Termonbacca
- Died: 25 February 1907 Derry, Northern Ireland

Styles of John Keys O'Doherty
- Reference style: The Most Reverend
- Spoken style: Your Lordship or Bishop
- Religious style: Bishop
- Posthumous style: not applicable

John Keys O'Doherty, D.D. (1833–1907), was an Irish Roman Catholic prelate. He served as Bishop of Derry from 1889 to 1907.

== Early life and education ==
John Keys O'Doherty was born in Derry in Sept 1833, studied at St Patrick's College, Maynooth and ordained a priest on 4 August 1861.

Much of ministry as a priest was spent in parishes including Carndonagh, Malin and Newtownstewart where he was Parish Priest when appointed Bishop of Derry on 28 December 1889.

== Bishop of Derry ==
He was consecrated on 2 March 1890, the first bishop consecrated in St Eugene's Cathedral.

His term of office coincided with dramatic developments in Anglo-Irish affairs which stretched from the fall from grace of Charles Stewart Parnell, the Gaelic revival movement, and the political upheaval created by the efforts to achieve Irish Home Rule.

During his episcopate he worked hard to fundraise for St. Eugene's Cathedral and two new avenues were constructed providing access to the cathedral from William Street and Great James Street. Although he did much to develop St Eugene's Cathedral the bishop is buried in the grounds of St Columba's Church, Long Tower where he had been baptised and ordained to the priesthood.
