= Bernard O'Kane =

Bernard O'Kane may refer to:

- Bernard O'Kane (bishop) (1867–1939), Irish Catholic bishop
- Bernard O'Kane (scholar), Irish Islamic scholar
