= St Columb's College =

Location
- Buncrana Road; Derry; Northern Ireland

Information
- Type: Secondary school
- Motto: Quaerite Primum Regnum Dei (Seek Ye First the Kingdom of God)
- Religious affiliation: Roman Catholic
- Established: 3 November 1879
- Principal: Caroline McLaughlin
- Age: 11 to 18
- Enrolment: 1800
- Colour
- Website: http://www.stcolumbs.com

St Columb's College is a Roman Catholic boys' grammar school in Derry, Northern Ireland. Since 2008, it has been a specialist school in mathematics. It is named after Saint Columba, the missionary monk from County Donegal who founded a monastery in the area. The college was originally built to educate young men into the priesthood, but now educates boys in a variety of disciplines.

St Columb's College was established in 1879 on Bishop Street (now the site of Lumen Christi College), but later moved to Buncrana Road in the suburbs of the city.

== Early history ==
St Columb's College was preceded by several failed attempts to create such an institution in Derry. Repeated but sporadic efforts were made to maintain a seminary for almost a century; at Clady, near Strabane, in the late eighteenth century, at Ferguson's Lane in Derry in the early nineteenth century and at Pump Street (first reference to St Columb's College as such) in the city from 1841 to 1864.

St Columb's finally opened its doors on 3 November 1879 with two priest teachers, Edward O'Brien and John Hassan. The school was considered to be quite large at the time and was expected to accommodate 20–30 boarders. The school quickly gained a reputation for academic achievement. On 18 September 1931 the Derry Journal listed St Columb's College's academic results. They were as follows:

- 2 university scholarships
- 3 exhibitions and prizes
- 6 calls in King's Scholarship exam (calls to teacher training)
- 2 pupil teacherships
- 8 regional committee scholarships
- 31 passed matriculation
- 26 passed Senior Leaving Cert. exam
- 52 passed Junior Leaving Cert. exam

== The Education Act 1947 and expansion ==
One of the most notable alumni of St Columb's College, John Hume, noted, "When the history of St. Columb's College in this century is written, it will be clear that one of its major transformations, if not its major transformation, took place as a result of the Eleven Plus examination."

The Education Act 1947 provided for free secondary education to all throughout the United Kingdom. Entry to St. Columb's College, a grammar school, would be determined by one's performance in the 11-plus or Transfer Test. The immediate result was an explosion in pupil numbers, a shortfall in teaching staff and greater pressure on existing resources. In 1941 the student body numbered 263. By 1960 the number stood at 770 with a teaching staff of 35. In under twenty years the school's size had tripled. It was now clear that additional facilities would be needed.

In September 1973 St. Columb's College opened a new campus on the Buncrana Road in the city. The new site would cater for the senior years; its initial enrolment was of 900. The new building was designed by Frank Corr of Corr & McCormick and constructed by J Kennedy & Co. The total cost was £762,000. This figure does not include the £56,000 spent employing W & J McMonagle Ltd to construct the playing fields. The school consolidated at the Buncrana Road campus in 1997, and handed over the Bishop Street campus to Lumen Christi College.

== Sport ==
The school is noted for alumni success in athletics, especially association football, Gaelic football, and basketball, with student teams competing in several national and even international events. St Columb's participated in the U13 School's World Cup in 2025, winning 3rd place.

== Nobel Prize winners ==
The school claims two Nobel Prize laureates amongst its alumni. They are:

- Seamus Heaney – Nobel Prize in Literature, 1995
- John Hume – Nobel Peace Prize, 1998 (shared with David Trimble)

== Notable former pupils ==
The college's former pupils association makes an annual award (the Alumnus Illustrissimus Award) to "a past-pupil who has achieved something of major significance or has made a considerable contribution in his own field". Notable winners of the award are as follows:

- 1994 Edward Daly
- 1995 John Hume, former MP, MEP
- 1996 Seamus Heaney, poet
- 1997 Brian Friel, playwright
- 1999 Brendan Devlin, cleric
- 2002 Martin O'Neill, football player and manager
- 2003 Phil Coulter, composer
- 2004 honouring all alumni (as part of the school's 125th anniversary celebrations)
- 2005 James Sharkey, diplomat
- 2006 Sir Liam McCollum, Lord Justice of Appeal in Northern Ireland
- 2007 Peter McCullagh (mathematician) and John Toland (mathematician)
- 2008 Patrick Johnston, director of the Centre for Cancer Research and Cell Biology (CCRCB) and dean of the School of Medicine and Dentistry, Queen's University Belfast
- 2009 Seamus Deane, poet, novelist
- 2010 Sir Declan Morgan, Lord Chief Justice of Northern Ireland
- 2011 Paul Brady, singer-songwriter, musician
- 2013 Brian Dooher, Gaelic football player
- 2015 Eamon Martin, Archbishop of Armagh and Primate of All Ireland
- 2016 Maurice Harron, Sculptor
- 2018 Mark Durkan, former MP and leader of the SDLP
- 2019 Tony Connelly, RTÉ European Correspondent

Other alumni and names associated with St Columb's include:

- Adam B, Irish YouTuber, actor
- Liam Ball, Irish Olympic swimmer
- Éamonn Burns, Gaelic Athletic Association footballer
- Daniel Joseph Bradley, physicist
- Denis Bradley, former vice-chairman of the Northern Ireland Policing Board
- Francie Brolly, Sinn Féin politician
- Ivor Canavan, Alliance Party of Northern Ireland politician
- Daniel Collins, Irish rower and national indoor rowing champion
- Peter Cunnah, pop musician
- Richard Doherty, British military historian; RUC reservist; chairman of the Institute of Road Safety Officers 1988-91, 2000-02.
- Willie Doherty, Turner Prize-nominated visual artist
- Mark H. Durkan, Social Democratic and Labour Party (SDLP) politician
- Colum Eastwood, Social Democratic and Labour Party (SDLP) politician
- Felim Egan, Artist
- Neil Farren, Former President of St. Columb's College, and Bishop of Derry
- Darron Gibson, footballer
- Paddy Gormley, nationalist politician
- Maurice Harron, Sculptor
- George Leeke, nationalist MP
- Seamus Mallon, rugby player
- Eamonn McCann, political activist, author
- Liam McCormick, architect
- Johnny McDaid, musician
- Mark McFadden, broadcaster, journalist
- Brian McGilloway, author
- Seosamh Mac Grianna, writer
- Paul McLoone, musician/frontman of The Undertones and DJ with Today FM.
- Gerard McSorley, actor
- Marcas Ó Murchú, folk musician
- John O'Neill, Northern Ireland football player
- John O'Neill, guitarist with The Undertones and That Petrol Emotion
- Damian O'Neill, guitarist with The Undertones and That Petrol Emotion
- Luke O'Reilly, actor
- Patrick McGilligan, lawyer, politician and academic, TD for NUI, Minister for Industry and Commerce (1924–32), also founder, ESB
- Cathal Breslin, Musician
- Eamonn O'Doherty, sculptor

== The Boys of St Columb's ==
St Columb's featured in the film The Boys of St Columb's made by West Park Pictures and Maccana Teoranta for RTÉ. Following the lives of several Irish figures including Nobel laureates Seamus Heaney and John Hume who all attended the same small school in Derry in the 1950s and have helped transform modern Ireland. The Boys of St Columb's was released on DVD in early March 2010 by Digital Classics DVD.

== Presidents of St Columb's College ==
Name	Period of Presidency	Notes
Edward O'Brien	1879–1880	Ordained in 1859 he became the first President of St. Columb's College in 1879. He formerly held the Chair of Rhetoric at St Patrick's College, Maynooth. Pope Leo XIII conferred on him the degree of D.D. and he was appointed Vicar General of the diocese.
John Hassan	1881–1888	Ordained in 1879, he took his D.D. the same year. Pope Leo XIII made him a domestic prelate and conferred on him the dignity of monsignor. Vice-rector of the Irish College from 1888 until his death in 1891.
Thomas McCloskey	1888–1890	Ordained in Rome in 1886
Charles MacHugh	1890–1905	Ordained 1881. Bishop of Derry 1907–26. Figured prominently in campaign against conscription. He was one of 18 Catholic and 3 Protestant bishops who signed manifesto against Irish partition on 7 May 1917. Led the first Irish national pilgrimage to Lourdes. As bishop he preferred to live in the college, and it was there that he died.
Bernard O'Kane	1905–1919	A graduate of the Royal University and ordained in 1891. A brilliant scientist, he was a regular contributor to technical journals on astronomy, light and radio waves and modern wireless, working in parallel with and sometimes anticipating the discoveries of Guglielmo Marconi. He was bishop from 1926 to 1939.
John McShane	1919–1927	Ordained 1900. He was president during the troubles of 1920 when the college was at the centre of a small but deadly civil war. He was opposed to corporal punishment – a man before his time.
Neil Farren	1928–1939	Graduated from University College Dublin with first class honours in 1914. He received a BCL and a BD from Maynooth in 1916 and 1918, respectively. Awarded the degree of DCL for his (later published) thesis Domicile and Quasi-Domicile. He became Ireland's youngest bishop in 1939. During the Second World War he was appointed "ordinary" of the American forces in Ireland, a kind of bishop away from home, and his services were recognized by the award of the United States Medal of Freedom.
Joseph O'Doherty	1939–1943	Ordained 1919. A talented ventriloquist and prestidigitator.
Eugene O'Doherty	1943–1944	Ordained 1921. He received a D.D. for his thesis, Doctrinal Process and its Laws. His is the shortest presidency on record as he was appointed Bishop of Dromore within months of his assuming the post.
Patrick McDowell	1944–1950	Ordained 1925. He received a D.D. for his postgraduate work on The Church and Economics at Dunboyne House. Appointed a domestic prelate with the rank of monsignor in 1966.
Anthony Columba McFeely	1950–1959	Ordained in Rome in 1932. Noted for his patronage of the school plays and musicals of the time. Consecrated as Bishop of Raphoe in 1965.
John Farren	1959–1969	Ordained 1941. Appointed immediately after ordination to the college staff he was to serve for almost thirty years, presiding over the purchasing of site, planning, and commencement of building of the new St. Columb's College at Buncrana Road.
James Coulter	1969–1983	Ordained in 1943. Became official diocesan historian. Noted for his expansion of the curriculum to include German, Spanish, Economics and Accounts and for his careful management of the school through civil strife. He was made a Prelate of Honour but he refused the offer of an OBE.
Ignatius McQuillan	1983–1990	Studied at St Columb's College, St Patrick's College, Maynooth, and took sabbatical leave in 1983 at the University of Oxford. Noted for his successful introduction of the new GCSE system. He later helped found Lumen Christi College.
John R. Walsh	1990–1999	Author of A History of the Irish Church (500–700), Noble Story and Religion: The Irish Experience which is a necessary source book for the new RE syllabus in the Republic of Ireland. Noted for his consolidation of the school on the new Buncrana Road campus.
Eamon Martin	2000–2008	Studied at St Columb's College, St Patrick's College, Maynooth, Queen's University, Belfast, University of Cambridge and the Institute of Education in London. Secretary-General of the Irish Catholic Bishops' Conference 2008–10. Appointed Vicar General of the Diocese of Derry in 2010. Appointed Chaplain of His Holiness in 2011 and granted dignity of 'Monsignor'. Served as diocesan administrator following the retirement of Bishop Séamus Hegarty in 2011. Appointed Coadjutor Archbishop of Armagh in 2013. Archbishop of Armagh and Primate of All Ireland since 2014.
Sean McGinty	2008–2012	First lay principal of St Columb's College.
Finbar Madden	2012–2023	Second lay principal of St Columb's College.
Caroline McLaughlin	2024 -	
