= Francis Kelly (bishop of Derry) =

- Bishop of Derry
- Church: Catholic Church
- Diocese: Diocese of Derry
- In office: 18 June 1864 – 1 September 1889
- Predecessor: John McLaughlin
- Successor: John Keys O'Doherty
- Previous posts: Titular Bishop of Titiopolis (1849-1864); Coadjutor Bishop of Derry (1849-1864)

Orders
- Ordination: 13 June 1840
- Consecration: 21 October 1849 by John MacHale

Personal details
- Born: 6 August 1812 Drudgeon (near Omagh), County Tyrone, United Kingdom of Great Britain and Ireland
- Died: 1 September 1889 (aged 77)

Styles of Francis Kelly
- Reference style: The Most Reverend
- Spoken style: My Lord or Bishop

Francis Kelly was an Irish prelate of the Roman Catholic Church in the 19th century.

Kelly was born in Drudgeon, County Tyrone on 6 August 1812 He was educated at St Patrick's College, Maynooth and ordained on 13 June 1840. After curacies in Strabane and Culdaff he was parish priest at Upper Fahan. He served as Coadjutor Bishop of Derry from 1849 until 1864, and then Diocesan Bishop of Derry until his death on 1 September 1889.
