= Éogan of Ardstraw =

Irish monk

Saint Éogan of Ardstraw
- Born: Unknown; Laigin, Ireland
- Died: c. 618
- Venerated in: Roman Catholic Church; Eastern Orthodox Church
- Feast: 23 August (Catholic)
- Patronage: Derry; Diocese of Derry

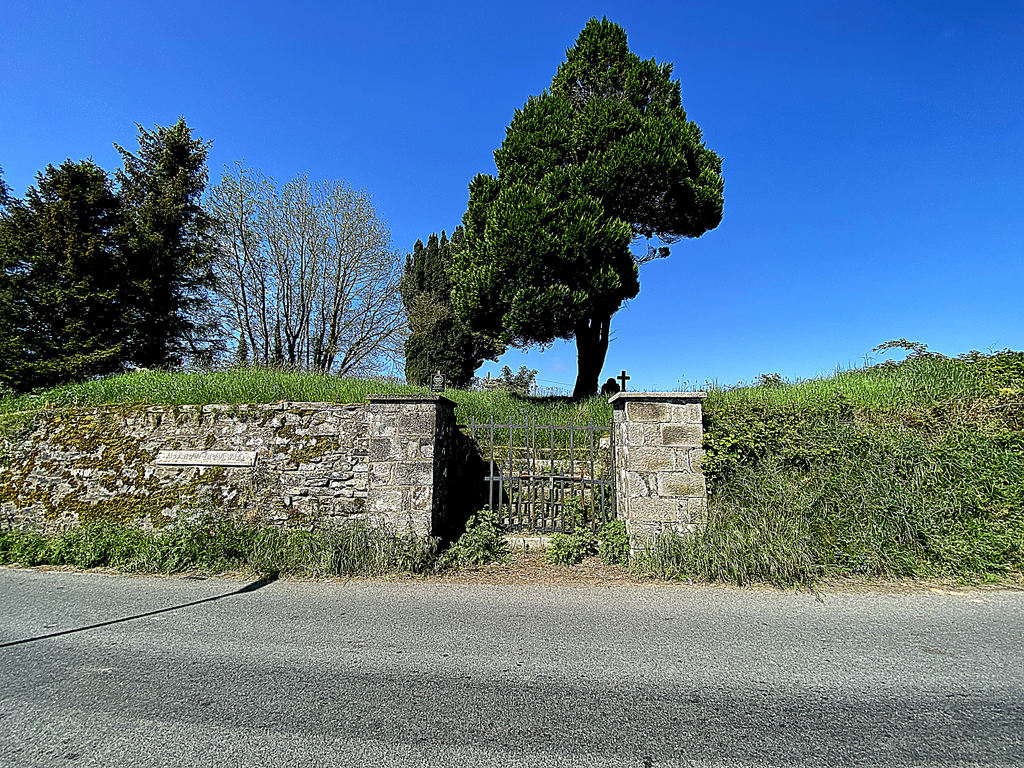
The graveyard at Ardstraw, built on the old monastic site

Saint Éogan (d. c. 618) was the founder of the monastery of Ardstraw, Ireland.

== Name ==
The name Éogan ([ˈeːo̯.ɣan]) is an early Irish male name, derived from the Primitive Irish *Iwagenas, and equates to the Welsh Owain. In more modern forms of Irish it is written as Eóghan or Eoghan (/'oːəun/). It means "born under the protection of the yew tree".

== Life ==
Éogan was born in Laigin (Leinster). According to his Vita, Eoghan was born the son of Cainneach and Muindeacha. His mother is said to have been of the Mugdorna of south-east Ulster. These people seem to have had some contact with the Laighin (who gave their name to Leinster), to whom his father Cainneach belonged. Since this is the area where Christianity first reached Ireland it may well be that Eoghan's father's family had been Christian for some time. As a boy, he studied at Clones Abbey, and it was from there that he was carried off to Britain by pirates, and subsequently, he was taken captive to Brittany, together with Cairbre of Coleraine and St. Tighernach, who is best known as the founder of the abbey of Clones, County Monaghan. On obtaining his freedom, he went to study at St. Ninian's Candida Casa. Others said to have studied with Ninian include Finnian of Moville. He may also have spent some time in Brittany (Armorica). Returning to Ireland, he made a foundation at Kilnamanagh, in the Wicklow hills.

After presiding over the Abbey of Kilnamanagh (County Wicklow) for fifteen years, he settled in the valley of the Mourne (County Tyrone), his mother's country, about the year 576. It is reasonable to assume that Eoghan came north not just as a missionary to pagans, but also ‘as a pilgrim for the sake of Christ’ in exile. It was not necessary to go abroad to do this. Due to the division of Ireland into several independent states or túatha, exile meant leaving one’s own and taking one’s chances in another túath. Without personal resources, one had no honour or personal standing outside one’s own túath. He was followed by many disciples including his kinsman, St. Kevin of Glendalough, who completed his studies under this saint. So great was the fame of the sanctity and learning of St. Eoghan, at Mourne, that he was consecrated first Bishop of Ardstraw about the year 581. Ardstraw is a monastic site on the River Derg in modern County Tyrone.

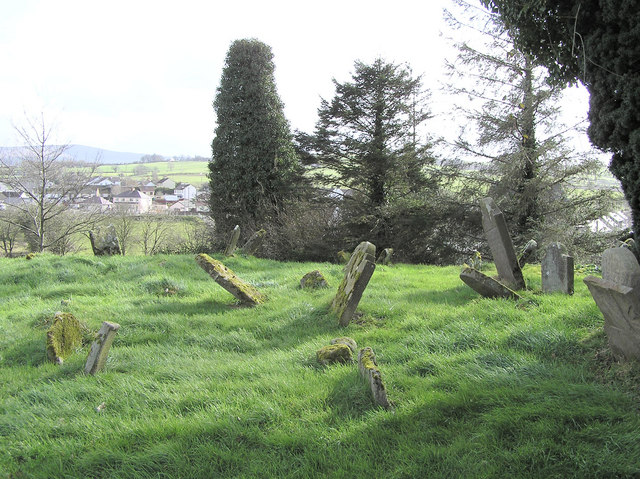
The old graveyard in Ardstraw

His Vita contains a number of miracle stories. While going through the forest Craoibheach (modern-day Cruagh, a townland near Wicklow) he sang fifty psalms and when his attendant answered "Amen" at the end of the Lord's Prayer the trees all around also answered "Amen". It also mentions his close relations with Tighernach of Clones and Cairbre of Coleraine, which might indicate an alliance of monasteries threatened by the dominance of Armagh.

It is difficult to give his chronology with any degree of exactness, but the Irish annalists give the date of his death as 23 August 618.

== Veneration ==
St. Eoghan is the patron saint of the Diocese of Derry and of its Cathedral. His feast is celebrated on 23 August.
