= Michael O'Reilly =

Michael O'Reilly may refer to:

- Michael O'Reilly (hunger striker), Irish revolutionary and one of the longest hunger strikers in history
- Michael O'Reilly (boxer) (born 1993), Irish boxer
- Michael O'Reilly (prelate) (died 1758), Irish bishop of Derry
- Mikey O'Reilly (born 2002), Irish cricketer
- Michael O'Reilly (runner), English long-distance runner and winner of the 1992 Japan Marathon Championships
- Michael O'Reilly (voice actor), Canadian voice actor in Young Robin Hood and other animated series
- Michael O'Rielly, U.S. Federal Communications Commissioner
