= Charles McHugh =

Charles McHugh may refer to:

- Charles McHugh (politician) (1887–1927), Australian politician
- Charles McHugh (bishop) (1856–1926), Irish Roman Catholic bishop
- Charles McHugh (actor) (1870–1931), American film actor of the silent era
