= Eamon Martin =

Catholic archbishop; Primate of All Ireland

The Most Reverend Eamon Martin KC*HS
- Archbishop of Armagh; Primate of All Ireland
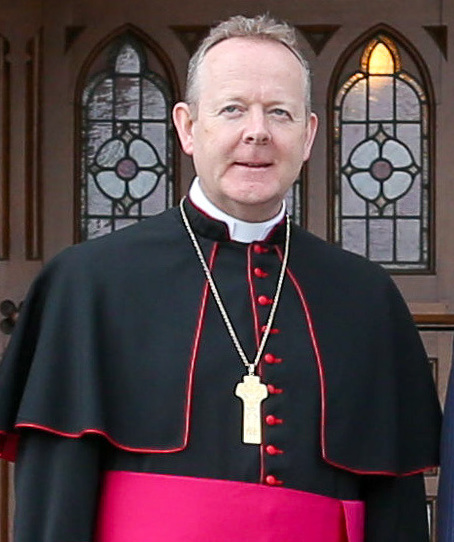
- Martin in 2019
- Church: Roman Catholic
- Archdiocese: Armagh
- Appointed: 18 January 2013 (coadjutor)
- Installed: 21 April 2013 (coadjutor); 8 September 2014 (Archbishop)
- Predecessor: Seán Cardinal Brady
- Other posts: President of the Irish Catholic Bishops' Conference; Apostolic administrator of Dromore
- Previous posts: Diocesan administrator and vicar general of the Diocese of Derry; Executive secretary to the Irish Catholic Bishops' Conference; President of and Head of Religious Education and Teacher at St Columb's College

Orders
- Ordination: 28 June 1987 by Edward Daly
- Consecration: 21 April 2013 by Seán Brady

Personal details
- Born: 30 October 1961 (age 64) Derry, Northern Ireland
- Residence: Ara Coeli, Armagh, Northern Ireland
- Parents: John James and Catherine Martin
- Education: St Edmunds College, Cambridge; UCL Institute of Education; Queen's University Belfast; St Patrick's College, Maynooth
- Motto: Cantate canticum novum (Sing a new song)
- Coat of arms

Eamon Columba Martin KC*HS (born 30 October 1961) is an Irish Catholic prelate from Northern Ireland who has served as Archbishop of Armagh and Primate of All Ireland since 2014.

== Early life and education ==
Martin was born in Pennyburn, Derry, on 30 October 1961, one of twelve children to John James Martin and his wife Catherine (née Crossan). He attended primary school at St Patrick's Primary School, Pennyburn, and secondary school at St Columb's College.

Martin studied for the priesthood at St Patrick's College, Maynooth, where he graduated with a Bachelor of Science in mathematical science and a Bachelor of Divinity. During his time in Maynooth, Martin was a senior cantor and leading member of the seminary choir, serving as Acting Director of Sacred Music in his final year.

He was ordained a priest for the Diocese of Derry on 28 June 1987.

== Presbyteral ministry ==
Following ordination, Martin's first pastoral appointment was as assistant priest in the cathedral parish in Derry between 1987 and 1989. Between September 1990 and September 1998, he taught mathematics and religion at St Columb's College, being appointed head of religious education in September 1997.

Martin completed a Master of Philosophy in school development at St Edmunds College, Cambridge, between 1998 and 1999. Upon his return to the Diocese of Derry, he was appointed president of St Columb's College in May 2000. Martin has also completed a postgraduate certificate in education from Queen's University Belfast and a National Professional Qualification for Headship from the UCL Institute of Education.

He was subsequently appointed executive secretary to the Irish Catholic Bishops' Conference in June 2008, before returning to the Diocese of Derry two years later upon his appointment as vicar general.

Martin was appointed Chaplain of His Holiness by Pope Benedict XVI on 18 November 2010.

He was also a regular contributor to Thought for the Day and Prayer for the Day on BBC Radio 4, and celebrant and preacher on Sunday Morning Worship on BBC Radio Ulster, as well as on other programmes on RTÉ and the BBC World Service.

=== Diocesan Administrator of Derry ===
Following the resignation of Séamus Hegarty as Bishop of Derry on 23 November 2011, Martin was elected diocesan administrator on 25 November.

In 2012, he published plans to radically reform Catholic post-primary education in the diocese, with an aim to end academic selection and single-sex education, as well as to create two new sixth-form colleges in Derry.

== Episcopal ministry ==
Styles of Eamon Martin
- Reference style: The Most Reverend
- Spoken style: Your Grace
- Religious style: Archbishop

=== Coadjutor Archbishop of Armagh ===
Martin was appointed as coadjutor archbishop of Armagh by Pope Benedict XVI on 18 January 2013. He spoke of his shock upon learning of the appointment, saying:

I am very conscious of the great trust that the Holy Father has placed in me, but in truth, I have to admit it was with considerable nervousness and trepidation that I accepted his call.

The Bishop Emeritus of Derry, Edward Daly, said that Martin was seen as "a clean pair of hands" after the sexual abuse scandals, adding that the new coadjutor archbishop "[did] not carry any baggage from the past with him".

Martin was consecrated by the Archbishop of Armagh and Primate of All-Ireland, Seán Brady, on 21 April in St Patrick's Cathedral, Armagh.

=== Archbishop of Armagh and Primate of All-Ireland ===
In accordance with canon law, Brady tendered his resignation in July 2014, ahead of his 75th birthday on 15 August. It was announced on 8 September that Pope Francis had accepted his resignation and that Martin would succeed him to the see and primacy of Ireland with immediate effect.

It was reported in The Irish Times that Martin was a relative "unknown" in Rome, with zero visibility in the Vatican.

Martin is an honorary fellow of St Edmunds College, Cambridge.

In his capacity as Archbishop of Armagh and Primate of All-Ireland, he was elected President of the Irish Catholic Bishops' Conference that October.

=== Apostolic Administrator of Dromore ===
Following the resignation of John McAreavey as Bishop of Dromore on 26 March 2018 and subsequent retirement of Philip Boyce as apostolic administration, Martin was appointed Apostolic Administrator of Dromore by Pope Francis on 15 April 2019.

== Views ==
=== Abortion ===
In a 2013 interview, Martin said that legislators who clearly and publicly supports abortion should not seek to receive Communion as legislators who support abortion are excommunicating themselves.

=== Child abuse ===
Upon his appointment as coadjutor archbishop of Armagh in 2013, Martin addressed the sexual abuse scandals that came to light in Ireland over the last two decades, stating that "[one] of the greatest challenges facing our Church is to acknowledge, live with, and learn from the past, including the terrible trauma caused by abuse". He added that the church "can never take it for granted that the safeguarding systems we have in place are robust and fail-safe, so we have to keep working on that".

Martin is also a director of the National Board for Safeguarding Children in the Catholic Church.

=== Same-sex marriage ===
Following the passing of a referendum permitting same-sex marriage in the Republic of Ireland on 22 May 2015, Martin has said that the Catholic Church felt a sense of "bereavement", with Cardinal Secretary of State, Pietro Parolin, calling the result a "defeat for humanity".

Martin referred to Parolin's comments as an expression of the deeply held conviction about the meaning of marriage in the Catholic Church:

One of the difficulties of the debate was that we had two parallel discussions going on. One was about the meaning of marriage and the other was about respecting gay people and showing tolerance," he said. "I think what Cardinal Parolin was expressing was our deeply held conviction about the meaning of marriage. He said three things. He said, look, I'm saddened by the result which I think a lot of people in this country are also. He said this isn't just a defeat for Christian principles, it's a defeat for humanity. I think what he was trying to do was express the loss that has occurred here and we do feel it's a loss. Something very unique and precious has been lost. That's not in any way to say that there are not a lot of people who were very happy with the result, and we could see that on the night of the result.

=== United Ireland ===
In 2016, Martin expressed his support for a United Ireland, saying:

I do believe that Ireland should be one and I would like to work for that, and continue to work for that, by peaceful means.

=== COVID-19 pandemic ===
Speaking to the News at One on RTÉ Radio 1 on 29 October 2020, Martin criticised the imposition of a ban on all public worship in the Republic of Ireland with the introduction of Level 3 restrictions during the COVID-19 pandemic, saying that such a ban had been imposed without any meaningful consultation with religious leaders across the island. He went to state that he was not aware of any evidence that church buildings had been a source of contagion or of spreading the disease.

Catholic Church titles
Preceded by Seán Brady	Archbishop of Armagh since 2014	Incumbent
Order of precedence in Northern Ireland
Preceded by High sheriffs of counties (see list here) (during term of office and within bounds of counties)	Gentlemen; Roman Catholic; Archbishop of Armagh and Primate of All Ireland	Succeeded by Dermot Farrell
