= Charles McHugh (bishop) =

Irish Roman Catholic prelate

The Most Reverend Bishop Charles McHugh
- Roman Catholic Diocese of Derry
- Church: Catholic Church
- Diocese: Derry
- In office: 1907–1926 (died)
- Predecessor: John Keys O'Doherty
- Successor: Bernard O'Kane

Orders
- Ordination: 25 June 1882
- Consecration: 29 Sept 1907 by Michael Logue

Personal details
- Born: 12 August 1856
- Died: Derry, Northern Ireland
- Motto: 'In Deo Spes Mea'

Styles of Charles McHugh
- Reference style: The Most Reverend
- Spoken style: Your Lordship or Bishop
- Religious style: Bishop
- Posthumous style: not applicable

Charles McHugh (1856 – 12 February 1926) was an Irish Roman Catholic prelate and was Bishop of Derry for nineteen years from 1907 to 1926.

== Early life and education ==
He was born in the parish of Aghyaran in West Tyrone in 1856, son of Francis and Catherine McHugh. He was educated locally before proceeding to St Patrick's College, Maynooth and was ordained to the priesthood in St Eugene's Cathedral in June 1881.

His first pastoral appointment was to the staff of St Columb's College Derry and after some years with failing health he asked for a curacy. After recuperation he was appointed President of the college in 1890 and spent 15 years in that role until he was made Parish Priest of Strabane in 1905.

== Bishop of Derry ==
At the time of his appointment as bishop the Irish Times reported him to be "a prelate of thought, ripe scholarship and invariable courtesy."

He received episcopal consecration on 29 September 1907 and for much of his episcopal ministry the social and political backdrop was the rising Home Rule crisis and then more latterly, the Partition of Ireland which divided his diocese into two separate states. McHugh was an active supporter of John Redmond up to the start of the First World War.

In July 1916 Bishop McHugh established the Anti-Partition League to campaign against the threat of the Partition of Ireland.

McHugh died in office on 12 Feb 1926.
