= Neil Farren =

Irish educator, activist and priest

- Bishop of Derry
- Church: Catholic Church
- Diocese: Diocese of Derry
- In office: 5 August 1939 – 13 April 1973
- Predecessor: Bernard O'Kane
- Successor: Edward Daly

Orders
- Ordination: 28 April 1918
- Consecration: 1 October 1939 by Joseph MacRory

Personal details
- Born: 25 March 1893 Buncrana, County Donegal, United Kingdom of Great Britain and Ireland
- Died: 7 May 1980 (aged 87)

Neil Farren (25 March 1893 – 7 May 1980), Bishop of Derry and Apostolic Administrator, was an Irish educator, activist, and Roman Catholic priest.

== Early life and education ==
Neil Farren was born in Buncrana, County Donegal, Ireland and received his secondary education at St. Columb's College in Derry. He graduated from University College, Dublin with first class honours BA in 1914. He received a Bachelor of Divinity and a Doctor of Divinity from Maynooth College in 1916 and 1918, respectively. At the end of World War I in November 1918, he was ordained to the priesthood for service in the Derry Diocese.

After ordination, he took on postgraduate studies at the Pontifical Gregorian University, and was awarded the degree of Doctor of Canon Law for his (later published) thesis 'Domicile and Quasi-Domicile'. As a priest, he taught in Derry and became President of St. Columb's College in Derry at the age of 35, and served in this post from 1928 until 1939 when he was appointed bishop. He was bishop when the building of the new St. Columb's College was begun. He was a brilliant mathematician and administrator who had an interest in design also, e.g. he designed the St. Columb's College crest and suggested to architect Liam McCormick, to base the design for a new St. Aengus church, Burt, County Donegal on the ancient Grianan of Aileach ring fort that stands on a hill above what is today the architectural award-winning, circular, church building.

== Episcopal ministry ==
Farren was Ireland's youngest bishop when appointed in 1939 and during the Second World War he was appointed "ordinary" of the American forces in Ireland, a service recognised by the award of the United States Medal of Freedom. He participated in the Vatican Council in Rome (1962–65). He was bishop during 'the Troubles' and during 'Bloody Sunday'. During his time as bishop he campaigned for a university in Derry.

He took an active interest with his Church of Ireland counterpart, Cuthbert Peacocke, in seeking to restore peace among the communities in Derry, and he engaged with nationalist and civil rights activists Eddie McAteer and John Hume. A book about Dr. Farren has been written by Rev. Bernard Canning of the Roman Catholic Diocese of Paisley in Scotland. An obituary recalled that he became bishop at a time of rapid expansion and that he "opened 25 new schools, 23 new post-primary schools and many more primary schools."

He served as Bishop of Derry until his 80th birthday in 1973. and then as apostolic administrator until the appointment of Edward Daly as his successor in 1974. Farren died on 7 May 1980, aged 87, having spent his retirement in his native Buncrana. His remains are interred to the right of the main entrance of St Eugene's Cathedral, Derry. Next to his remains lie the remains of his successor, Dr. Edward Daly.

== See also ==
- Catholic Church in Ireland
