= This Is Not Ok! =

Single by Skruff
- Released: June 2009
- Recorded: 2009
- Genre: Electronic rock, indie rock
- Length: 2:50 (album version)
- Songwriter(s): Conor McGowan, Peter Eastwood, Aodhan Doherty, John McLaughlan

"This Is Not Ok!" was a single released by Northern Irish rock band Skruff in 2009. The track was the lead single from the EP of their self-titled Skruff EP. The Video for this song was filmed in Derry City Centre.
