= Mícheál Mac Lochlainn =

Mícheál Mac Lochlainn (also known in Latin as Mauricius) O.F.M. (died 1349) was a mediaeval Bishop of Derry. A predecessor was another member of the lineage, Gofraid Mac Lochlainn, while in the 1800s Peter and John MacLaughlin held the office.
