= Skruff =

Rock band from Derry, Northern Ireland

- Origin: Derry, Northern Ireland
- Genres: Electronic rock, indie rock
- Years active: 2000 – 2010
- Labels: None
- Members: Conor McGowan, Peter Eastwood, Aodhan Doherty
- Past members: John McLaughlan
- Website: Skruff

Skruff were a four-piece rock band from Derry, Northern Ireland. They were formed when members Conor McGowan, Peter Eastwood and Aodhan Doherty met at Lumen Christi College and formed a band at the age of 15. They released five EPs and toured regularly in Northern Ireland and England, including dates in Lancaster and Manchester., they also supported The Twang, The Futureheads and The Enemy.

Their music was played on BBC Radio 1, Across The Line, Channel 4 Radio and BBC 6 Music.

In 2009, they released their final EP which included the lead single "This Is Not Ok!" and the video for the track was shot in Derry City Centre.

The Belfast Telegraph has characterized their music as "dance enhanced rock with electrifying pop melodies".

== Discography ==
=== EPs ===
- Touch (2004)
- Carnival of Chaos (2005)
- Hot Robot (2007)
- Naked Us (2008)
- This Is Not Ok! (2009)

=== Singles ===
- "This Is Not Ok!" (2009)

=== Music videos ===
Year	Video	Director
2009	"This Is Not Ok!"	Seamus Hannigan
