= Lumen Christi College, Derry =

Lumen Christi College

Location
- Bishop Street; Derry, County Londonderry, BT48 6UJ; Northern Ireland; 54.991°N 7.329°W

Information
- Type: Grammar school
- Motto: In Tuo Lumine Videmus Lumen; In your light, we see light
- Religious affiliation: Roman Catholic
- Established: 1997
- Local authority: Education Authority (Western)
- Specialist: LLW (Learning for Life and Work)
- Principal: James Neilly
- Vice principals: Bronach O’Hare
- Grades: 8-14
- Gender: Co-educational
- Age: 11 to 18
- Enrolment: 840 (approx)
- Colour
- Website: www.lumenchristicollege.co.uk

Lumen Christi College is a co-educational Catholic grammar school in Derry, Northern Ireland. The school was founded in 1997, and is located at the site of the old St Columb's College.

== Academics ==
The college offers the full Northern Ireland Curriculum at Key Stages 3 and 4. At Key Stage 4 all students usually take a minimum of nine GCSEs while, at Sixth Form, all students take at least three A-Levels. The college is a member of the Foyle Learning Community which links twelve post-primary providers in the area allowing access for post-16 students to a range of subjects in addition to those taught on site.

In the 2017 Sunday Times Parent Power survey of UK schools, the college was ranked first in Northern Ireland and 22nd in the UK.

81.6% of its students who sat the A-level exams in 2017/18 were awarded three A*-C grades.

In 2016/17, 96% of its entrants achieved five or more GCSEs at grades A* to C, including the core subjects English and Maths. In 2017/18, 100% of its entrants achieved five or more GCSEs at grades A* to C and the college was ranked joint first in the 2019 Belfast Telegraph league table.

== Notable alumni ==
- Seán Doherty (born 1987) - composer and musicologist
- Damian McGinty (born 1992) - singer and actor
- Skruff - four-piece rock band

== Controversy ==
In April 2008, both Dr Séamus Hegarty (Roman Catholic Bishop of Derry, a co-educational Catholic grammar school trustee of the college) and Caitríona Ruane, the Minister for Education, along with the Irish National Teachers' Organisation (I.N.T.O.) trade union, criticised the Board of Governors of Lumen Christi College for announcing their intention to continue academic selection after the abolition of the 11-plus examination.

The school's then-principal, Patrick O'Doherty, responded that the school intended to go ahead with its testing plans, and that the education minister had no legal authority to stop them. Regarding accusations in 2012 of Sinn Féin infiltrating Catholic schools, by placing Sinn Féin activists as school governors, Alliance Party MLA Trevor Lunn said, "In the context of Lumen Christi as a highly successful grammar school which has taken a public stance on the question of academic selection, in defiance of the minister's instruction and indeed the view of the Catholic Church, it is hard to see co-educational Catholic grammar school anything other than a means of infiltration of the school's board of governors, with the aim of influencing the stance taken by the present board."
