= Michael Router =

Irish Roman Catholic prelate (born 1965)

The Most Reverend Michael Router MRE DD
- Bishop of Derry
- Church: Roman Catholic
- See: Derry Diocese
- Appointed: July 16, 2026
- Installed: September 20, 2026
- Predecessor: Donal McKeown
- Previous posts: Vicar forane for the Bailieborough deanery Chairman of the council of priests and Director of adult faith formation and pastoral renewal for the Diocese of Kilmore; Chaplain at Bailieborough Community School; Chaplain and Teacher at [[St Patrick's College, Cavan, Auxiliary Bishop of Armagh]]

Orders
- Ordination: 25 June 1989 by Francis MacKiernan
- Consecration: 21 July 2019 by Eamon Martin

Personal details
- Born: 15 April 1965 (age 61) Virginia, County Cavan, Ireland
- Parents: Anthony and Nora Router
- Education: Mater Dei Institute of Education; St Patrick’s College, Maynooth
- Motto: In manus tuas, Domine (Into your hands, Lord)
- Coat of arms: Michael Router's coat of arms

Styles of Michael Router
- Reference style: The Most Reverend
- Spoken style: Your Grace
- Religious style: Bishop

Michael Router (born 15 April 1965) is an Irish Catholic prelate who has served as Bishop of Derry since 20 September 2026. In July 2026 he was appointed as Bishop of Derry by Pope Leo XIV and was installed on September 20 succeeding Bishop Donal McKeown

== Early life and education ==
Router was born in Rahardrum, Virginia, County Cavan, on 15 April 1965, one of three children to Anthony and Nora Router. He played Gaelic football for Ramor United and Killinkere, and attended primary school at Virginia National School and the Christian Brothers secondary school in Kells, County Meath. Router began studying for the priesthood at St Patrick's College, Maynooth, in 1982, completing a Bachelor of Divinity and a higher diploma in education.

He was ordained a priest for the Diocese of Kilmore on 25 June 1989.

== Presbyteral ministry ==
Following ordination, Router's first pastoral assignment was as curate in Killinkere, between 1989 and 1991. Between 1991 and 1996 he taught English, geography and religion at St Patrick's College, Cavan, while also serving as chaplain and coaching basketball and Gaelic football.

Router was appointed chaplain to Bailieborough Community School, where he also coached basketball and Gaelic football, and resident priest in Kilmainhamwood and Moybologue in 1996, before completing a Master of Religious Education at Mater Dei Institute of Education, Dublin, between 2002 and 2003, during which time he was assistant priest in Our Lady of Good Counsel parish, Drimnagh.

Router returned to the Diocese of Kilmore in 2003, where he was appointed resident priest in Castletara (centred on Ballyhaise) and diocesan director of adult faith formation and pastoral renewal, where he was responsible for providing training, encouragement and support for parish pastoral councils, liturgy groups, Eucharistic ministers and Ministers of the Word. Router also facilitated the provision of adult religious education courses in the diocesan pastoral centre and in Manorhamilton, which were accredited by the Mater Dei Institute of Education and the Maryvale Institute. During his time in Ballyhaise, he also served as a selector for the local Gaelic football club between 2004 and 2012. It was during his time as diocesan director of adult faith formation and pastoral renewal that Router also wrote a religious affairs column for The Anglo-Celt and the Cavan Voice.

He was appointed director of the diocesan pastoral centre in 2010, and curate in the cathedral parish of Urney and Annagelliff (centred on Cavan and Butlersbridge), with responsibility for Butlersbridge, in 2013.

Router was appointed parish priest in Killann (centred on Bailieborough and Shercock) and vicar forane for the Bailieborough deanery in 2014. He also served on the diocesan college of consultors and as chairman of the diocesan council of priests since 2017.

== Episcopal ministry ==
Router was appointed auxiliary bishop-elect of Armagh and titular bishop-elect of Lugmad by Pope Francis on 7 May 2019.

He was consecrated by the Archbishop of Armagh and Primate of All Ireland, Eamon Martin, on 21 July in Saint Patrick's Cathedral, Armagh.

As of 2019, Router was based in Dundalk, County Louth.
