= Michael O'Reilly (prelate) =

Irish Catholic prelate (c. 1690–1758)

- Archbishop of Armagh; Primate of All Ireland
- Church: Catholic Church
- Archdiocese: Archdiocese of Armagh
- In office: 23 January 1749 – 19 April 1758
- Predecessor: Ross MacMahon
- Successor: Anthony Blake
- Previous post: Bishop of Derry (1739-1749)

Orders
- Ordination: c. 1710
- Consecration: 23 September 1739 by John Linegar

Personal details
- Born: c. 1690 County Cavan, Kingdom of Ireland, English Empire
- Died: 19 April 1758 (aged 67–68)

Styles of Michael O'Reilly
- Reference style: The Most Reverend
- Spoken style: Your Grace or Archbishop

Michael O'Reilly (born circa 1690, died 1758) was an Irish prelate of the Roman Catholic Church. He served as Bishop of Derry from 1739 to 1749 and Archbishop of Armagh from 1749 to 1758.

Born in County Cavan, he studied theology in Paris and was ordained in 1710. He served as parish priest in Cavan.

He was Rector of Drogheda, and was recommended as the Bishop of Derry by James Francis Edward Stuart on 10 April 1739. His papal brief was dated 24 April 1739 and his episcopal ordination took place on 23 September 1739. The following year, he was one of the assisting bishops at the consecration of Francis Stuart, Bishop of Down and Connor. O'Reilly was translated to the Metropolitan see of Armagh as archbishop and primate on 23 January 1749.

He died in office in 1758, and was buried near Drogheda.

== Bibliography ==
- Brady, W. Maziere (1876). The Episcopal Succession in England, Scotland and Ireland, A.D. 1400 to 1875. Vol. 1. Rome: Tipografia Della Pace.
- Fryde, E. B.; Greenway, D. E.; Porter, S.; Roy, I., eds. (1986). Handbook of British Chronology (3rd, reprinted 2003 ed.). Cambridge: Cambridge University Press. ISBN 0-521-56350-X.

Catholic Church titles
Preceded by Neil Conway	Bishop of Derry; 1739–1749	Succeeded by John Brullaghhaun
Preceded by Ross MacMahon	Archbishop of Armagh and Primate of All Ireland; 1749–1758	Succeeded by Anthony Blake
