= Marcas Ó Murchú =

Irish flute player

Marcas Ó Murchú is an Irish woodwind flute player from Belfast, Northern Ireland. In 1997 his album Ó Bhéal go Béal (CICD 126) was released and in 2013, he became the "Chief Bard of Irish Music".

== Musical background ==
He became Music Laureate Ard-Ollamh, the "Chief Bard of Irish Music" at the All-Ireland fleadh cheoil in 2013. This was to recognise his success in teaching, promotion of Irish language through his musical programmes on BBC and RTÉ Raidió na Gaeltachta and his research into Irish music. Some of his historical research on seventeenth-century chieftains of Irish royal descent in Europe was published in a large volume of essays by Ulster University.

He lectured in Spanish in BIFHE Belfast Institute and in Music at Ulster University and Limerick University. He also lectured in Irish language and literature in Magee College, Derry.

Ó Murchú has features on some BBC traditional programmes, including Musical Traditions and 'Seinn liom' where he talks about his musical journey through life. He talks about the blind composer, Josie McDermott, and how he inspired him in his flute playing.

Ó Murchú has performed on TG4 on numerous occasions and has presented a number of programmes, most notably, Geantraí. He is known for broadcasting a weekly summer radio show, Turas Ceoil, on RTÉ Raidió na Gaeltachta relating to Irish music.

He was solo flute player for the specially arranged third movement of Shaun Davey's Relief of Derry, originally composed for Planxty piper Liam Ó Flynn. He played solo flute with a 500-piece flute orchestra for charity in 2014.

He donated more than 700 hours of his own field recordings to the Irish Traditional Music Archive in Dublin.

== Personal life ==
He lives in Derry and taught Spanish and Irish at St Columb's College before his retirement in 2019.
