= St Columba's Church, Long Tower =

- Long Tower Church
- Séipéal Naomh Cholumba ar an Túr Fada
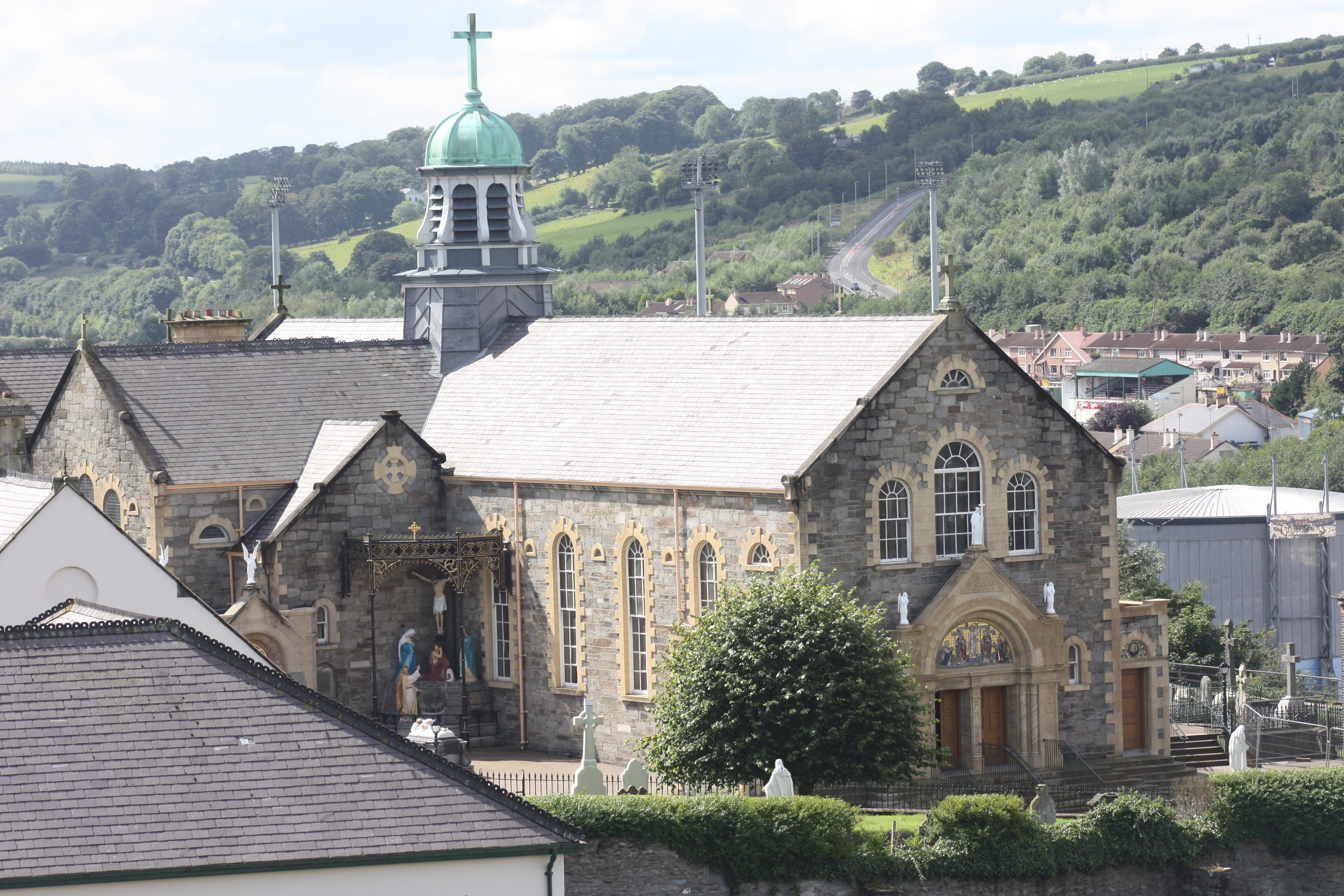
- Pictured in 2009

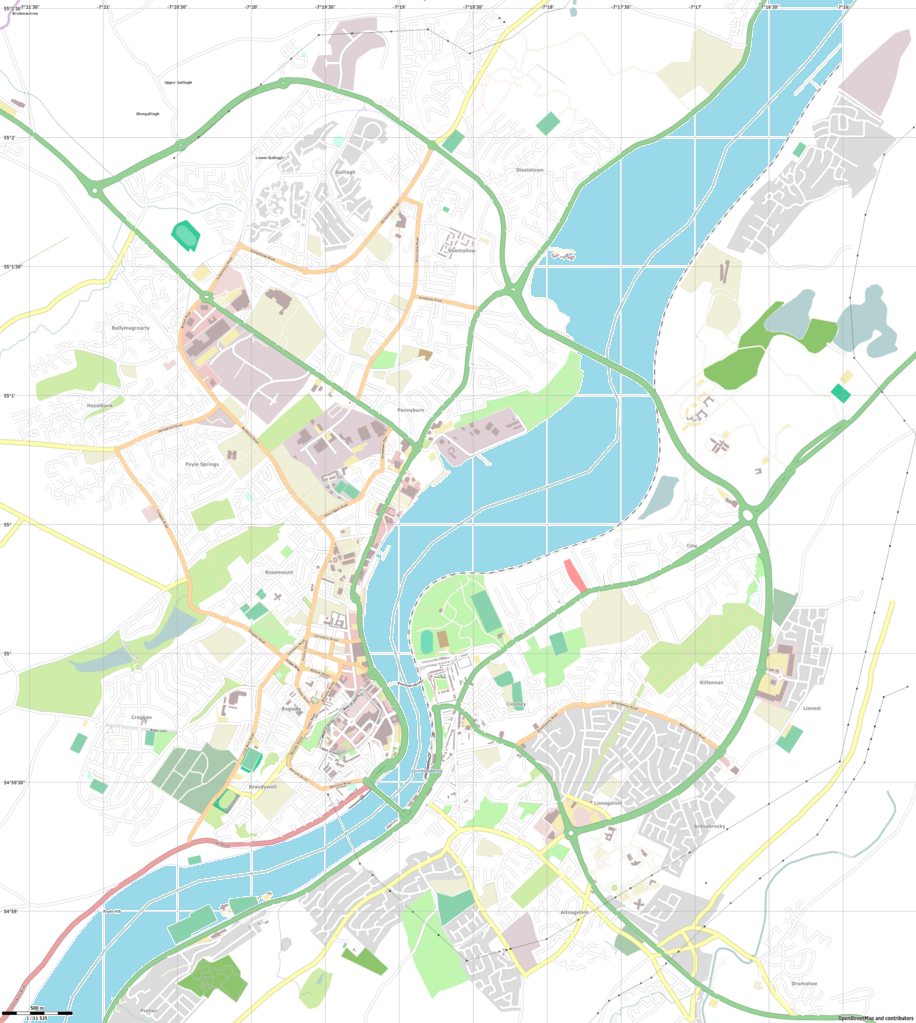
- Location within Derry
- 54.9929°N 7.3285°W
- Location: Longtower Street, Derry
- Country: Northern Ireland
- Denomination: Catholic
- Churchmanship: Roman Rite
- Website: longtowerchurch.org

History
- Dedication: Columba

Architecture
- Functional status: active
- Style: vernacular
- Years built: 1783–88
- Groundbreaking: 12th century

Specifications
- Length: 53 m (174 ft)
- Width: 21 m (69 ft)
- Materials: limestone, slate, cast iron, stained glass

Administration
- Province: Armagh
- Diocese: Derry
- Parish: Templemore

St Columba's Church, Long Tower is a Roman Catholic Church in the Diocese of Derry. It is located in the heart of the city of Derry in Northern Ireland.

The present church is built on the site of Roman Catholic worship which goes back as far as the 12th century. The current Long Tower Church began life in 1783 in a much smaller scale than seen today. Father John Lynch, a parish priest in Derry started action to raise funds for building the Long Tower Church and he received finance not just from Roman Catholics but also Protestant people in Derry at the time. The church was opened in 1788.

== Refurbishments of the Church ==
The church was extended and refurbished in 1810 with the introduction of gallery seating, nave and the changing of the Altar to the northern side of the church. The High Altar was constructed with marble and supported by four pillars. The four pillars were first made of wood put proved to be not strong enough to hold the large and heavy marble altar and so the pillars were changed to be made out of marble. The layout of the church from 1810 onwards has remained largely unaltered. However, in 1908 a full refurbishment of the Long Tower took place which included addition of new stained-glass windows, statues, shrines, baptismal font and the reposition of the High Altar and the introduction of a new sacristy.

The church's refurbishment was completed in 1909 and the church was then officially opened to the general public.

== Cemetery collapse ==
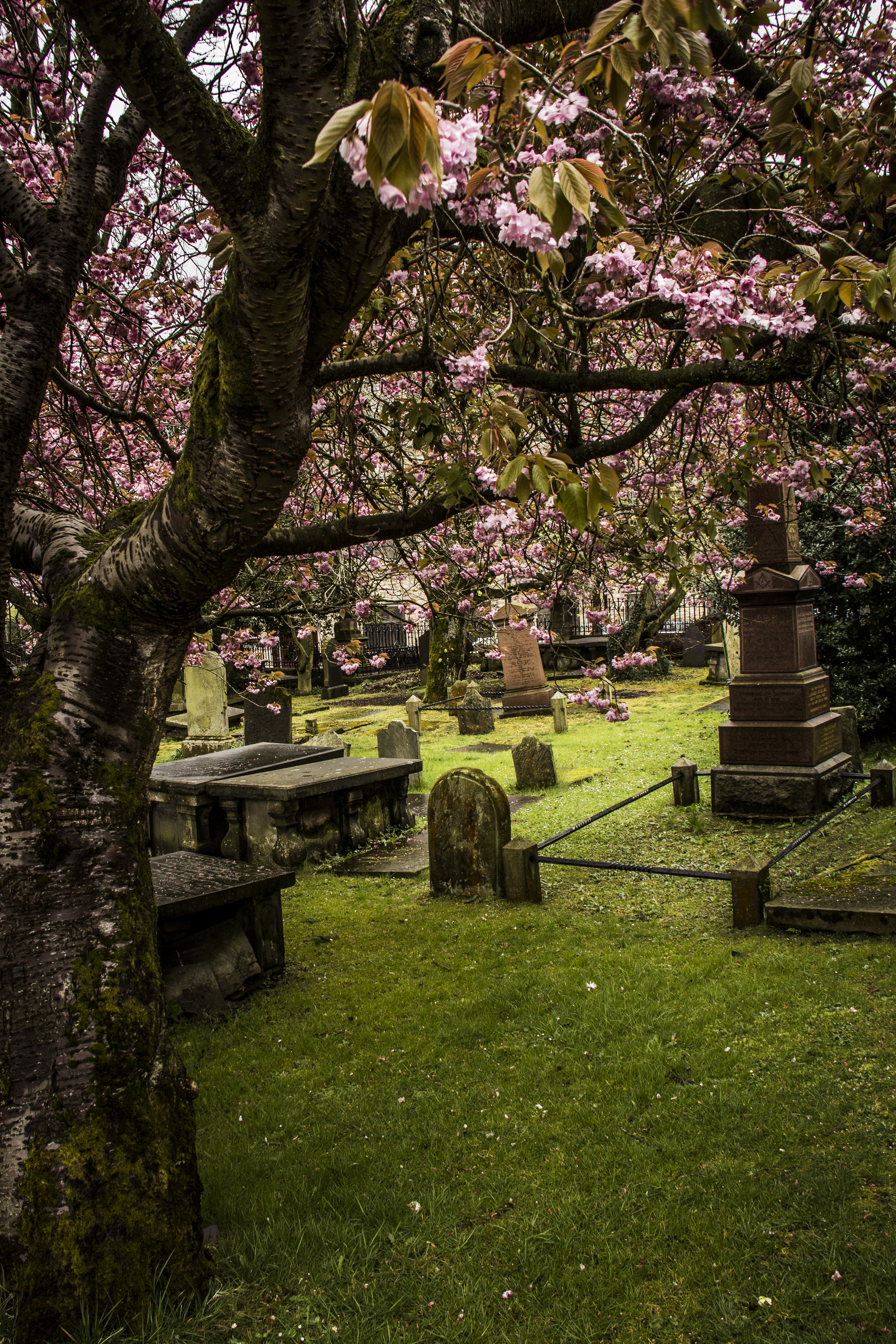
The churchyard

On the morning of 8 January 1934 a perimeter wall of the cemetery, facing Lecky Road, collapsed, causing a landslide of a section of the graveyard. No passers by were injured in the slide but many graves were dislodged, causing bodies to be strewn among the debris. The Lecky Road has been remodelled in the decades since but the area where the graveyard collapsed can still be seen from the Lecky Road flyover.

== The Long Tower Today ==
he construction of St Eugene's Cathedral in 1873 as the mother church of the diocese created a larger and grander building for important diocesan events. This had the effect of reinforcing the sense of Long Tower as a more parish-focused, people-centred church.

When Vatican II changes in liturgy occurred in the 1960s, Long Tower priests and parishioners did not want to change the layout too much as Council documents did not mandate changes to church sanctuaries. In 1964, a temporary wooden altar was constructed and installed in the sanctuary to accommodate Mass being said facing the people. In 1979 the wooden altar was taken out and a new marble altar along with a new marble lectern and celebrants ambo were installed. The installation was minor to ensure the remainder of the church stayed. When other churches at this time were removing altar rails, High Altars, confessional boxes etc., the Long Tower did not. In 2012, the celebrant's marble ambo was removed from the sanctuary and the marble was used to create a brand new celebrant's chair in the sanctuary.

The parish population as of December 2015 was 6,761.

=== Clergy appointments in 21st century ===
In the Diocese of Derry clergy appointments for 2010 significant changes were made by then-Bishop of Derry Séamus Hegarty, Long Tower parish would have to share an administrator due to a priest shortage in the diocese. Father Michael Canny, administrator of St Eugene's Cathedral, became administrator of Long Tower. The previous administrator of Long Tower, Father Roland Colhoun, was appointed curate to the Derry parish of Glendermott.

From October 2013, the Long Tower parish was given independent status once again. Father Edward Gallagher was appointed administrator, with Father Brendan Collins as curate. The Bishop of Derry, Most Reverend Donal McKeown is the Parish Priest of the Templemore Parish of the Long Tower and St Eugene's Cathedral.

In August 2015, Bishop McKeown appointed Father Eamon Graham as the new administrator of the Long Tower Parish, with Father Edward Gallagher leaving the parish after two years as administrator.

In September 2016, the diocese announced a large number of priest changes made by Bishop McKeown. The Long Tower bid farewell to Fathers Eamon Graham and Brendan Collins. Father Aidan Mullan was appointed the new administrator of the Long Tower Parish. Due to a shortage of priests in the diocese, Bishop McKeown felt the Long Tower could cope with just one resident priest, with help from the neighbouring cathedral parish when necessary.

On Friday September 10, 2021, it was announced by the Long Tower Parish and the Diocese of Derry that the Long Tower administrator Father Aidan Mullan had died. His remains were moved to his home parish of Omagh, County Tyrone, where he was buried after a Requiem Mass.

Bishop McKeown announced on 15 September 2021 the appointment of Father Patrick Baker as the new Long Tower administrator.

In August 2022, Bishop McKeown appointed Father Gerard Mongan as administrator of the Long Tower parish. Father Mongan returns to the Long Tower parish after a nine-year absence, as Father Mongan was curate in the Long Tower from 2007 to 2013. Father Patrick Baker was appointed to the parishes of Burt, Inch & Fahan, and Buncrana as curate.

On Sunday 1 October 2023, Bishop McKeown appointed the newly ordained Father Stephen Ward to serve as curate in the Long Tower parish. This would be the first time since 2016 that the Long Tower parish has two diocesan priests serving it. In late July 2025, Bishop McKeown appointed Ward to a new appointment. This meant that once again reverts to being a one priest parish, however they will be helped by the retired priest Father John P Forbes and the priests of the Termonbacca Carmelite Priory

== Funeral of Martin McGuinness ==
On Thursday, 23 March 2017, the Long Tower Church hosted the Requiem Mass for Northern Ireland Deputy First Minister Martin McGuinness (Sinn Féin), who died on 21 March 2017, aged 66. The Mass was held on Thursday, 23 March 2017, in the Long Tower Church. The celebrant was Father Michael Canny, assisted by Father Aidan Mullan (administrator of the Long Tower), Father Christopher McDermott and Donal McKeown (Roman Catholic Bishop of Derry).

In attendance at the Funeral Mass were former US President Bill Clinton, Irish President Michael D. Higgins, Irish Prime Minister Enda Kenny, Northern Ireland's First Minister Arlene Foster, along with a large number of dignitaries which included representatives of the British government, former Irish Prime Ministers, Mary McAleese (former Irish President), representatives of the Roman Catholic, Presbyterian and Methodist Churches, members and former members of Irish and Northern Irish political parties, as well as members of the general public. McGuinness was later buried in the republican plot in Derry's City Cemetery.

== Long Tower Parish Timetable ==
Mass Times

- Sunday Obligation at 6.00pm (Saturday evening vigil); 8.00am, 10.00am & 12.00pm.
- Holydays of Obligation at 7.30pm Vigil; 10.00am & 7.30pm unless otherwise announced in the parish bulletin.
- Mondays to Fridays at 10.00am & 7.30pm.
- Saturday mornings at 10.00am.

Confessions

- Confessions are heard on Saturdays from 10.30am-11.30am & 5.00pm-5.45pm
- Confessions are heard Mondays to Fridays from 7.00pm-7.25pm.

Eucharistic Adoration

- Adoration of the Blessed Sacrament takes place in the church every Wednesday from 10.30am until just before the 7.30pm Mass.
- Adoration is also held in the Adoration Chapel located at 18 Pump Street in Derry's city centre every Monday to Saturday from 9.00am-6.00pm.
- Devotions are held in the Long Tower on the Sundays of Lent.
- A Novena dedicated to Our Lady of Perpetual Help is held on the nine Sundays leading up to Christmas at 6.00pm.
- The Rosary and Divine Mercy Chaplet is prayed in the church before all daily weekday masses.

Baptisms

- Baptisms are held in the church on Saturdays at 3.30pm.

== Centenary ==
The church celebrated its centenary on St Columba's Day, 9 June 2009. The clergy set aside the 9th day of each month from 9 June 2008 until 9 June 2009 to finish many renovations and repairs to the church. Since June 2008, the church has had a memorial installed dedicated to a former Bishop of Derry, Raymond O'Gallagher, who was martyred in 1601 in Claudy, County Londonderry, water fonts in the balcony area of the church repaired, the old water font next to Our Lady's grotto repaired, the tablets on the church floor which gives visitors information of where the High Altars where originally placed repaired, renovation of statues and the unveiling of the renovated tomb of former Bishop of Derry, John Keys O'Doherty.

Starting on Monday 17 November 2008, the three grand panels of the High Altar in the Long Tower Church, which depict Christ ascending into heaven flanked on either side by Saint Peter and Saint Paul, were taken down and transported to Belfast for urgent repair and renovation. The panels are made of lead and a recent expert survey concluded that they were dangerous and were in urgent need of repair. The panels were installed in the Long Tower Church in 1909 and had not had any renovation work carried out on them since their installation. The repair work could not be done on site in Derry and had to be taken to Belfast. The project cost the parish around £20,000 and had been many months in planning.

In February 2009 the newly renovated Opus Sectile were re-installed in the church. They were officially unveiled in a special mass held in the Long Tower on 9 March 2009. These are the three grand panels behind the high altar – the Ascension of Christ flanked by St Peter and St Paul. Opus sectile (pronounced “seck-teel-ay”) is the Latin name for a series of opalescent painted glass “tiles”, first used by the ancient Romans on luxury floors. Usually these glass sections are set in grout and there are many such examples around the inner walls of Long Tower. However what is distinct about the panels above the tabernacle is that they are set in lead. The experts say this is extremely rare and sets these particular panels apart as remarkable works of art.

A special Mass to commemorate the centenary was celebrated on 9 June 2009 with then-Papal Legate, Cardinal Keith O'Brien attending. This Mass was celebrated on the feast day of Saint Columba, while the church's anniversary had occurred on Saturday 30 May 2009. At 8.00 a.m., a Latin Mass was celebrated in the church which, apart from minor changes such as the addition of the mention of Saint Joseph in the canon of the Mass in 1962, was exactly the same as was said on the first day the church was opened to the public in 1909. After the evening Mass on Tuesday 9 June 2009 the annual blessing of Saint Columba's well occurred, which is located a short distance from the church in the Bogside. The following day before Mass, Cardinal O'Brien planted an oak tree in the graveyard next to the Long Tower as a symbol of the renovation of the graveyard for the centenary.

== Long Tower Parochial House ==
It was announced on 23 August 2009 that the current Long Tower parochial house would now become the home of the Franciscan Friars of the Renewal who are setting up a community in Derry. They have chosen the Long Tower Parochial House for their residence. This means the parish priests and staff will move their parochial house to the Convent of Mercy in Pump Street, which is located within the city walls of Derry. The sisters who had resided in the convent for 161 years have moved out to new residence and so the Long Tower will use this new city centre location as their new parochial house. Details of the move were published in the parish's Sunday bulletin on 23 August 2009.

In January 2014, it was announced that the friars would be moving out of the old Long Tower Parochial House which they have been residing in since 2009. The friars moved into the Galliagh Parochial House in Derry. The curate who serves the Galliagh area of Derry now resides in the neighbouring Carnhill Presbytery. The Galliagh Parochial House has now become St. Columba's Friary. The old Long Tower Parochial House in Victoria Place is now vacant. In October 2014, the decision was taken by the parish to return to the Victoria Place Parochial House, the priests returned on Thursday/Friday 16–17 October 2014.

== Renovation and Restoration Work ==
It was announced in June 2016 that extensive renovation work would take place to the interior of the church during the summer. Details were published in the parish bulletin which read - "We are delighted to announce that works to the Church are beginning this week. These works will include internal painting of the whole Church, refurbishment of the internal and external lighting and restoration and repair of all the windows. These works will last until the end of September and have been scheduled so as to cause the minimum amount of disruption." Updates on the progression of the renovations and repairs are updated on the parish website and on the parish Facebook page.

In November 2017, the administrator of the parish, Father Aidan Mullan revealed that extensive repair and renovation work was needed on the stonework of the church, which was in dire need of repair. The fabric of the stonework is fading away, with many parts of the stonework falling to bits. A special prize draw entitled SOS Save Our Stonework was launched and by May 2018 sufficient money was raised for repair and restoration work to commence. The project will take place in stages, with different parts of the church's exterior repaired and restored at different times. The whole restoration work was estimated to be completed by 2020 at a total cost of £400,000.
