= Richard Doherty =

Northern Irish historian and author (born 1948)

James Richard Doherty (born 19 May 1948), known as Richard Doherty, is a Northern Irish military historian and author from Derry in Northern Ireland.

Educated at St. Columb's College in Derry, he has written more than twenty books about British and Irish military history ranging from the Williamite wars through to the Second World War.

Doherty's father, J.J. Doherty, a native of County Tyrone and a British A.A. artillery gunner, served during the Second World War, as did four of Richard's uncles. J.J. Doherty died of cancer, a result of complications from wounds suffered during the war. His mother Anna Coyle, who also died of cancer, came from a nationalist background. His parents married at St Eugene's Cathedral, Derry. Richard Doherty was a Royal Ulster Constabulary (RUC) reservist from 1972 to 1974 and also served in the Territorial Army. He resides in Prehen in Derry. Richard Doherty was appointed High Sheriff of Londonderry City (2020-21).

Doherty's most recent book, British Armoured Divisions and their Commanders, 1939-1945, is published by Pen and Sword Books.

== Selected works (in alphabetical order) ==
1. A Noble Crusade: The History of Eighth Army, 1941 to 1945 (ISBN 1885119631)
2. Clear the Way!: A History of the 38th (ISBN 0716525429) - paperback
3. Irish Generals in the British Army in the Second World War (ISBN 0862813956)
4. Irish Men and Women in the Second World War (ISBN 1851824413)
5. Irish Volunteers in the Second World War (ISBN 1851825231)
6. Irish Winners of the Victoria Cross by Doherty & David Truesdale (ISBN 1851824421)
7. None Bolder: The History of the 51st (Highland) Division in the Second World War (ISBN 1862273170)
8. Only the Enemy in Front (Every Other Beggar Behind): The Recce Corps at War, 1940-1946 (ISBN 1871085187)
9. The Sound of History: El Alamein - 1942 (ISBN 186227164X)
10. The British Reconnaissance Corps in World War II (ISBN 9781846031229/ISBN 1846031222)
11. The North Irish Horse: A Hundred Years of Service (ISBN 1862271909)
12. The Thin Green Line: A History Of The Royal Ulster Constabulary GC 1922-2001 (ISBN 1844150585)
13. The Siege of Derry: A Military History (ISBN 1846820154)
14. The Williamite War in Ireland 1688-1691 (ISBN 1851823751)
15. Wall of Steel. The History of the 9th (Londonderry) Heavy Anti-Aircraft Regiment Royal Artillery (SR) (ISBN 0907528139)
