= John Tanner (bishop) =

Anglican bishop

John Tanner was an Anglican bishop in the early 17th century.

A Cornishman, he was consecrated Bishop of Derry in May 1613 and died in post on 14 October 1615

Church of Ireland titles
| Preceded by Brutus Babington | Bishop of Derry and Raphoe; 1613–1615 | Succeeded by George Downame |
