= Edward Daly (bishop) =

Irish Catholic priest

The Most Reverend Edward Daly
- Bishop of Derry
- Daly (right) on Bloody Sunday, an image which became one of the most recognisable moments of the Troubles
- Church: Latin Church
- Diocese: Derry
- In office: 1974–1994 (retired)
- Predecessor: Neil Farren
- Successor: Séamus Hegarty

Orders
- Ordination: 16 March 1957
- Consecration: 31 March 1974 by William Conway

Personal details
- Born: 5 December 1933 Ballyshannon, Ireland
- Died: 8 August 2016 (aged 82) Derry, Northern Ireland
- Motto: Pasce oves meas ("Feed my sheep")

Edward Kevin Daly (5 December 1933 – 8 August 2016) was an Irish Catholic priest and author. He served as the Bishop of Derry from 1974 to 1993. Daly took part in several civil rights marches and events during the Troubles. He came to wider attention during Bloody Sunday in January 1972, waving a blood-stained white handkerchief as he escorted a group carrying a mortally wounded protester after British troops opened fire on demonstrators.

== Early life and ministry ==
Daly was born in Ballyshannon, County Donegal, but raised in Belleek, County Fermanagh in Northern Ireland. His parents were Tom Daly and Susan Daly (née Flood), who were shopkeepers; he was the eldest of six siblings, including Tom Daly junior, who became a prominent politician. Daly attended and boarded at St Columb's College in Derry on a scholarship, after which he spent six years studying towards ordination to the priesthood at the Irish College in Rome. He was ordained a priest of the Diocese of Derry in Belleek on 16 March 1957. His first appointment was as a curate in Castlederg, County Tyrone. In 1962, he was appointed a curate in St Eugene's Cathedral in Derry, with responsibility for the Bogside area of the city. He left briefly in the 1970s to serve as a religious advisor to RTÉ in Dublin in the Republic of Ireland but spent the majority of his career in Derry.

== Bloody Sunday (1972) ==
During his time in Derry, he took part in the civil rights marches; he had first-hand experience of the Battle of the Bogside in 1969, the early years of the Troubles, internment, and the events of Bloody Sunday, in which British soldiers fired on unarmed protesters on 30 January 1972, killing 14 people. Daly became a public figure after he was witnessed using a blood-stained handkerchief as a white flag in an attempt to escort 17-year-old Jackie Duddy, a wounded protester, to safety. Duddy died of his injuries soon after and Daly administered the last rites; he later described the events as "a young fella who was posing no threat to anybody being shot dead unjustifiably". Duddy's family gave Daly a photograph of Jackie, which Daly always kept on his desk. He also gave an interview for the BBC in which he insisted, contrary to official reports, that the protesters were unarmed. He testified as such to the Widgery Tribunal, though he also testified that he had seen a man with a gun on the day, to the anger of some of those involved; the Widgery Report largely exonerated the British Army, perpetuating the controversy. Years later, Daly opined that the events of Bloody Sunday were a significant catalyst to the violence in Northern Ireland, and that the shootings served to greatly increase recruitment to the IRA.

The controversy over Bloody Sunday lasted for decades; Daly believed the shootings provided a catalyst for the IRA's increase in violence through the 1970s and beyond. Daly's actions were captured on camera by the news media and broadcast around the world, which gave him a greatly increased profile. Prior to Bloody Sunday, Daly was sympathetic to the "old" IRA, of which his father was a member, but the events of Bloody Sunday left him of the opinion that "violence is completely unacceptable as a means to a political end", which led to a tension with the Provisional Irish Republican Army throughout his career.

== Bishop of Derry (1974–93) ==
In 1973, Daly worked with RTÉ in Dublin as a religious adviser for several months. He appeared on numerous television programmes and contributed to many television documentaries on religious and Northern Ireland affairs. He was appointed Bishop of Derry in 1974—at 40, he was the youngest bishop in Ireland. His tenure was marked by conflict with the IRA over that organisation's use of violence to advance its political cause of a united Ireland; Daly and IRA spokesmen repeatedly exchanged words via the local press. The Catholic bishops of Ireland discussed the possibility of excommunicating IRA members several times during Daly's tenure, often in the aftermath of a particularly bloody attack, though no decision was ever reached. Daly was always reluctant to excommunicate and used the motto "better to communicate than excommunicate", for which he was severely criticised by the British tabloid press, but he was outspoken in his opposition to violence by both sides. He introduced a ban on paramilitary trappings at Catholic funerals and in 1976 organised a protest march through Derry city centre—a response to an increase in sectarian murders—which was joined by almost all the clergy in the city and led by Daly and his Protestant counterpart, an event which was unprecedented in the city's history.

Throughout his career and particularly his tenure as Bishop of Derry, Daly took a keen interest in the criminal justice system, seeking to attend to the needs of prisoners, internees, and victims of miscarriages of justice including the Birmingham Six (who were wrongly convicted and sentenced to life imprisonment for the 1974 Birmingham pub bombings, and whose convictions were quashed in 1991). Along with the Catholic primate of all Ireland, Tomás Ó Fiaich, Daly lobbied the British government in 1977 against its decision to revoke Special Category Status (political prisoner status) from IRA prisoners and subsequently their treatment as criminals. When the issue culminated in a hunger strike in 1981 which resulted in the deaths of ten prisoners at HM Prison Maze, he lobbied the European Commission on Human Rights to intervene.

In 1979, Daly was involved in planning a visit by Pope John Paul II to Armagh, scheduled for September and which had won the approval of the British government, but the visit was cancelled in the wake of the IRA's assassination of Lord Mountbatten and the Warrenpoint ambush (in which 18 British soldiers were killed), both on 27 August 1979. The visit was transferred to Drogheda, in the same archdiocese but across the border in the Republic, where the pope appealed to the IRA to give up armed resistance.

Tension between Daly and the IRA reached its peak in 1983 when Daly banned requiem mass with the body present, and forbade military trappings, at funerals of paramilitaries. The ban came after Daly negotiated an agreement with the IRA that there be no guns present at funerals, which the IRA breached when several of its members fired shots over a coffin during a ceremony.

Daly was deeply affected by the IRA's "proxy bombings" in October 1990, in which IRA members forced civilians to drive car bombs to their targets, with the result that the driver was killed in the explosion along with anybody in close proximity to the van. Daly described the bombings as having "crossed a new threshold of evil", and believed that while they may claim to be Catholics, "works proclaim clearly that they follow Satan".

While Daly was always willing to attend to the religious needs of IRA members, he refused to engage in any formal meeting until 1992, when John Hume—the leader of Northern Ireland's Social Democratic and Labour Party, who was attempting to negotiate a truce with the IRA, and with whom Daly was close friends—convinced him to meet Gerry Adams and Martin McGuinness. Daly later remarked that he shared much common ground with the two, particularly McGuinness, with whom he only substantially disagreed on the morality of using violence to achieve political aims.

Despite the tension between Catholics and Protestants in Northern Ireland, Daly maintained a personal friendship with James Mehaffey, the Anglican (Protestant) Bishop of Derry and Raphoe from the latter's appointment in 1980, which was described after Daly's death as "a powerful message of harmony and bridge-building". Among many joint projects Daly and Mehaffey co-founded two charities with the intent to promote community healing in Derry after years of sectarian violence. He retired from his position as Bishop of Derry in October 1993, after suffering a stroke. He was succeeded by Bishop Séamus Hegarty and in retirement took up the post of chaplain at Foyle Hospice.

== Later life ==
Daly published an autobiography, Mister, Are you a Priest?, in 2000. This he followed with a second memoir, A Troubled See: Memoirs of a Derry Bishop, published in 2011. He was also the author of Do Not Let Your Hearts Be Troubled, co-author of The Clergy of the Diocese of Derry: an Index and contributed an essay to A History of the Diocese of Derry. In A Troubled See, Daly discussed ending the compulsory celibacy for Roman Catholic priests; his view was that allowing priests to marry could alleviate the church's problems recruiting new priests. He was distressed that, despite a shortage of priests, priests were forced to resign or otherwise good candidates were rejected because of the celibacy rule; he felt that there was "certainly an important and enduring place for celibate priesthood. But I believe that there should also be a place in the modern Catholic Church for married priesthood and for men who do not wish to commit themselves to celibacy". The Association of Catholic Priests publicly supported his stance. Daly later clarified that he valued his own vow of celibacy, and that it enhanced his own life as a priest. He said, "I am not saying that celibacy should be abolished—I am saying to look at other people who feel they would not be able to live up to a vow of celibacy or undertake it and to look at the possibilities of introducing them to the priesthood [...] but I feel that the church must look at this again". He received criticism from some quarters for waiting until long retired to express his views, rather than airing them while he was in office.

The Saville Inquiry was established by British Prime Minister Tony Blair in 1998 as part of the Northern Ireland peace process in order to re-investigate the events of Bloody Sunday. The inquiry superseded the Widgery Report, which had been accused of whitewashing since its publication, and Daly welcomed the new inquiry, saying he was "full of hope" for it in 2000. He gave evidence to the inquiry in which he repeated his affirmation that the protesters had not been armed and described the sequence of event surrounding Jackie Duddy's death. Daly was part of a large crowd gathered outside Derry Guildhall when the report was published on 15 June 2010 and its conclusions read out by the prime minister, David Cameron, and broadcast on a large screen. The Saville Report upheld Daly's evidence that the marchers had been unarmed. Lord Saville believed that armed men were likely present, but did nothing that would prompt the army to open fire, and that many of the soldiers involved had lied in their accounts of their actions, though the shootings were not premeditated. He also found that the soldiers had fired without warning, had fired on people who were fleeing or rushing to help the wounded, and that none of those injured or killed posed a threat, nor had they done anything to give the soldiers cause to fire at them. Cameron apologised for the shootings, describing them as "unjustified and unjustifiable". Daly believed that the victims of Bloody Sunday and the campaigners for a new inquiry were vindicated by the verdict; he "felt a sense of uncommon relief that this burden has been lifted off my shoulders, and the shoulders of the people in this city".

In August 2010, Daly questioned the report into the 1972 Claudy bombing by the Police Ombudsman for Northern Ireland, Al Hutchinson. According to the report, detectives who investigated the attack, which killed nine people, believed that a priest (who died in 1980) was involved in its preparation. Hutchinson controversially concluded that the Catholic Church, the British government, and senior police officers covered up the allegations, and hampered the detectives' attempts to investigate them by having the priest moved to a parish in the Republic of Ireland. Daly stood by the priest, stating that he had discussed the matter with him in the 1970s and the priest had vehemently denied any involvement, and he professed that it was "beyond understanding" that the detectives had not arrested and questioned the priest during the original investigation.

He was awarded the Freedom of the City by Derry City Council in 2015 in a joint ceremony with Bishop James Mehaffey, with whom he had worked closely while the two were in office. Daly was ""hugely pleased to accept [the award], particularly when it is being shared with my friend and brother, Bishop James". The city's mayor, Brenda Stevenson, announced that the joint award was in recognition of the two bishops' efforts towards peace and community cohesion.

== Death and legacy ==
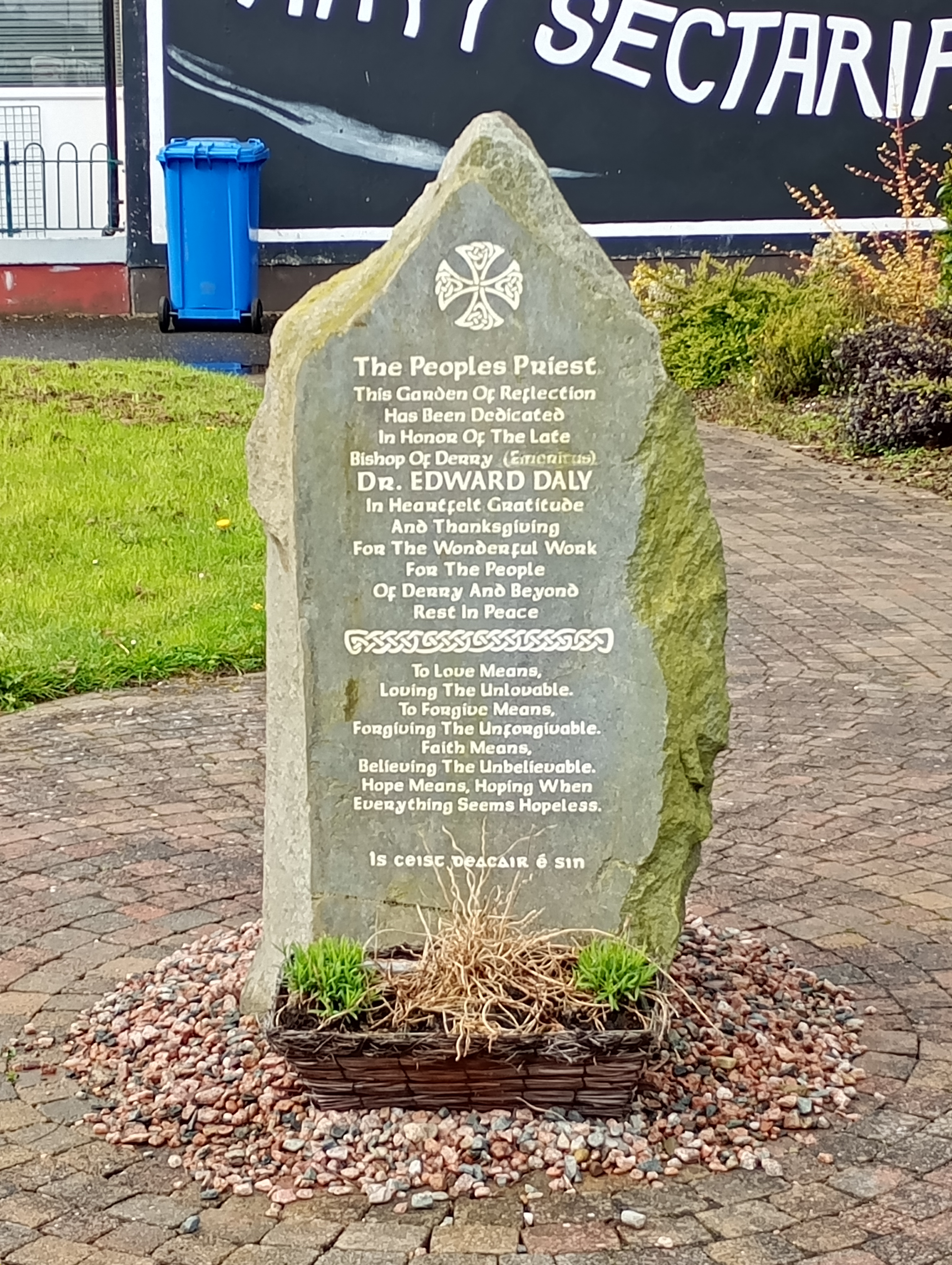
Memorial stone to Daly at Free Derry Corner

Daly died on 8 August 2016 at the age of 82, at Altnagelvin Area Hospital in Derry, having been admitted after a fall several weeks previously; he had also been diagnosed with cancer. He was surrounded by family and local priests.

Donal McKeown, the incumbent Bishop of Derry, announced Daly's death and paid tribute, saying that Daly "served, without any concern for himself, throughout the traumatic years of the Troubles, finding his ministry shaped by the experience of witnessing violence and its effects". Public figures including the Irish president, Michael D. Higgins, and his predecessor Mary McAleese paid tribute to Daly's work for peace during the Troubles, as did the leaders of various religious denominations in Derry. Archbishop Eamon Martin, Primate of All Ireland, described Daly as having "literally spent himself in the service of others", and said he will be remembered as "a fearless peacebuilder". According to The Guardian, in its obituary, the abiding memory of Daly is one of "a terrified but calm priest waving a bloodied white handkerchief", which the BBC described as "the iconic image of Bloody Sunday". Daly was never comfortable with the public profile he gained following his actions on Bloody Sunday and did not enjoy his duties as a bishop, particularly disliking the administrative responsibilities that came with the post. He believed he would not have been made Bishop of Derry had it not been for Bloody Sunday, and worried that his other work was overlooked as a result—that he "was the priest with the handkerchief and that was it". He was happier performing pastoral ministry, and felt that the years after his retirement as a bishop—which he spent tending to terminally ill hospice patients—were his "most fulfilling as a priest".

Daly's remains were taken to St Eugene's Cathedral, where he lay in state with mourners able to file past. His coffin was sealed at midday on 11 August 2016 and buried after Requiem Mass in the grounds of St Eugene's Cathedral alongside his predecessor as Bishop of Derry, Neil Farren. The bells of the cathedral tolled for one hour on the morning of Daly's death while many local people arrived to pay tribute. The mayor of Derry, Hilary McClintock, opened a book of condolence in the city's guildhall for members of the public to sign. The funeral, conducted by the incumbent Bishop of Derry Donal McKeown, was attended by multiple religious and political leaders from across Ireland and retired leaders from throughout Daly's career, and a message from Pope Francis was read out at the beginning of the service. Hundreds of members of the public also attended the funeral, some lining the route from the cathedral to the grave; Daly's coffin was greeted with applause as it was carried out of the cathedral for burial.

== Bibliography ==
- Edward Daly (2011). A Troubled See: Memoirs of a Derry Bishop. Four Courts Press. ISBN 978-1-84682-312-1.
- Edward Daly (2004). Do Not Let Your Hearts Be Troubled: Thoughts on Ministry to the Terminally Ill. Veritas. ISBN 1-85390-825-8.
- Edward Daly (2000). Mister, Are you a Priest?. Four Courts. ISBN 1-85182-591-6.
- Edward Daly, Kieran Devlin (1997). The Clergy of the Diocese of Derry: an Index. Four Courts. ISBN 1-85182-335-2.

Catholic Church titles
Preceded by Neil Farren	Bishop of Derry; 1974–1994	Succeeded by Séamus Hegarty
