= Mark McFadden =

Irish broadcaster and journalist

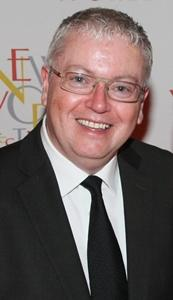
- Born: 1965 (age 60–61); Derry, Northern Ireland
- Education: St Columb's College
- Alma mater: Queen's University Belfast (BA)
- Occupations: Journalist, broadcaster
- Years active: 1988–2024
- Employer: UTV (ITV News)
- Known for: North West correspondent for UTV; coverage of the Bloody Sunday Inquiry
- Awards: World Gold Medal for Journalism (2011)

Mark McFadden (born 1965, Derry, Northern Ireland) is a former broadcaster and journalist with ITV News. He was based in Northern Ireland where he fronted broadcasts for UTV.

For three decades he was the North West correspondent for UTV Live, the flagship early evening news programme on the ITV regional channel.

== Early life ==
McFadden was born in Derry in 1965. He is a former pupil of St. Columb's College – a school that boasts Nobel prize-winners Seamus Heaney and John Hume among its alumni. After St. Columb's he studied English and French at Queen's University, Belfast.

== Journalism career ==
His career in journalism began in 1988 with the Derry Journal, the second oldest English-language newspaper in the world.

During six years at the Journal he worked in news, features and sports. He also contributed news and sports reports to London broadsheet newspapers The Guardian and The Daily Telegraph.

== Broadcasting career ==
In April 1994, McFadden joined the UTV Live team becoming the face of UTV in the North West of Ulster. He worked mainly on hard news reports – covering politics, serious crime, terrorism, the economy, etc. However, he also produces a wide range of material for the sports and features departments.

McFadden was UTV's correspondent throughout the entire course of the Bloody Sunday Inquiry. This Tribunal of Inquiry was chaired by Lord Saville of Newdigate, and it sat at the Guildhall in Derry and Methodist Central Hall in London. It was the longest and most expensive Inquiry in UK legal history. McFadden was the only television journalist to cover the Bloody Sunday Inquiry from its inception in 1998 to its conclusion in June 2010 when Lord Saville's final report was published.

In April 2011 he was one of UTV's analysts for Queen Elizabeth II's historic state visit to the Republic of Ireland, broadcasting from Dublin Castle and Croke Park. McFadden has also presented 12 series of "Rare Breed" for UTV, examining the multi-billion pound agriculture industry in Ireland. The programme has been picked up by international broadcasters including Netflix.

He was primarily based in UTV's studio in Derry, but also reported across Britain and Ireland.

== World Awards ==
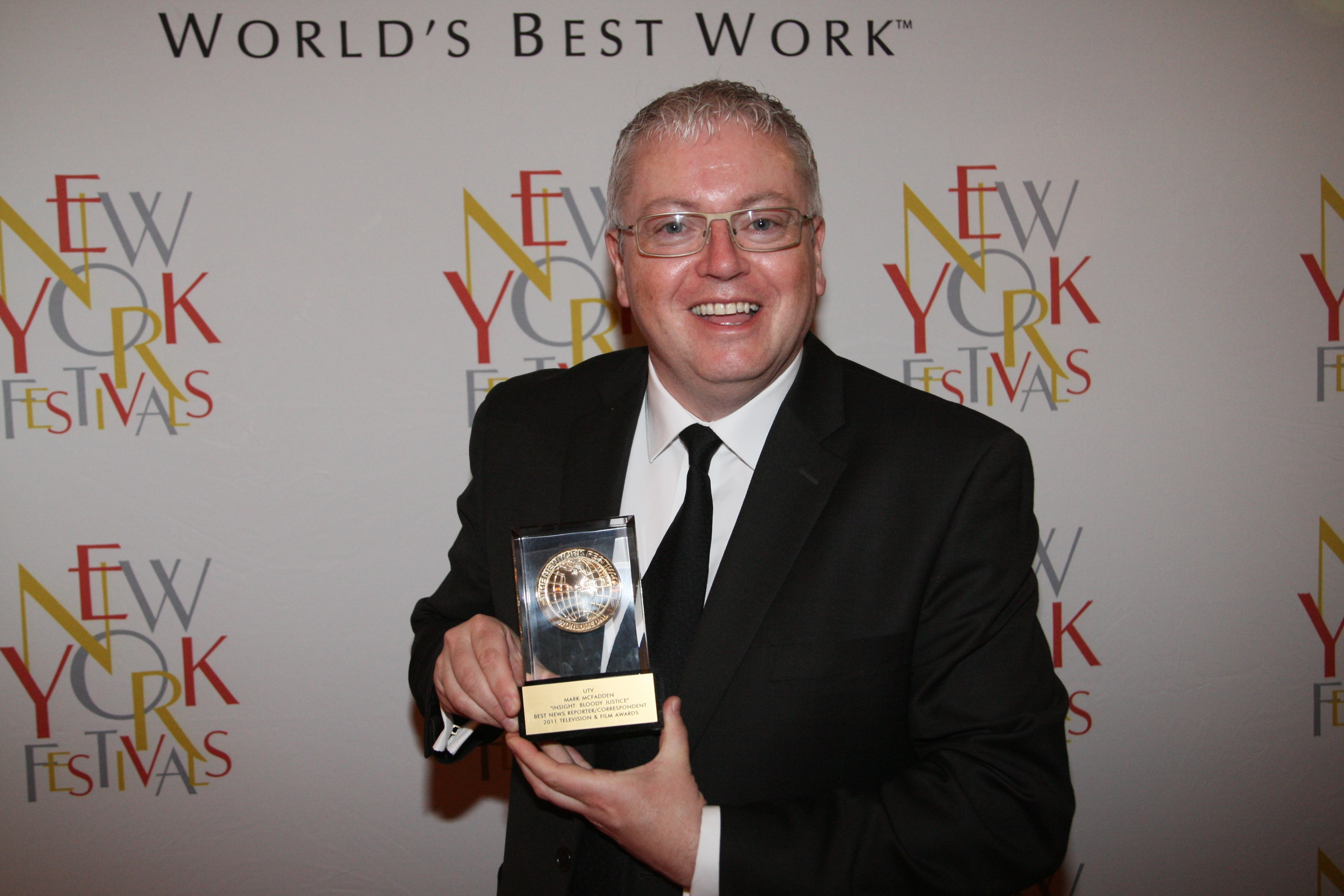
Mark McFadden in Las Vegas with the 2011 World Reporter/Correspondent of the Year trophy

McFadden has won a number of prestigious journalism awards at regional, national and international levels. In April 2011, he picked up two top prizes at the New York Festival's World Film & Television Awards. He won the World Gold Medal for journalism in recognition of his coverage of Lord Saville's inquiry into the Bloody Sunday shootings, and he scooped the World Silver Medal for his 2010 UTV documentary 'Insight: Bloody Justice' which examined Bloody Sunday and the Saville Inquiry.

'Bloody Justice' was also winner of the News & Current Affairs Programme of the Year prize at the 2011 Institute of Public Relations media awards. The Chairman of the Judges at the IPR Awards said: "I thought I knew all about Bloody Sunday until I watched 'Bloody Justice'. The sequence re-enacting the individual killings was gripping, evocative and startling. Each part of the current affairs machine purred powerfully through this splendid offering."

McFadden has since become a jury member for the World Film and TV Awards.

He retired from ITV and UTV in April 2024, marking the end of a 36 year career in the media.
