= Roman Catholic Diocese of Derry =

Catholic diocese in Ireland

Diocese of Derry Dioecesis Derriena Deoise Dhoire

Catholic
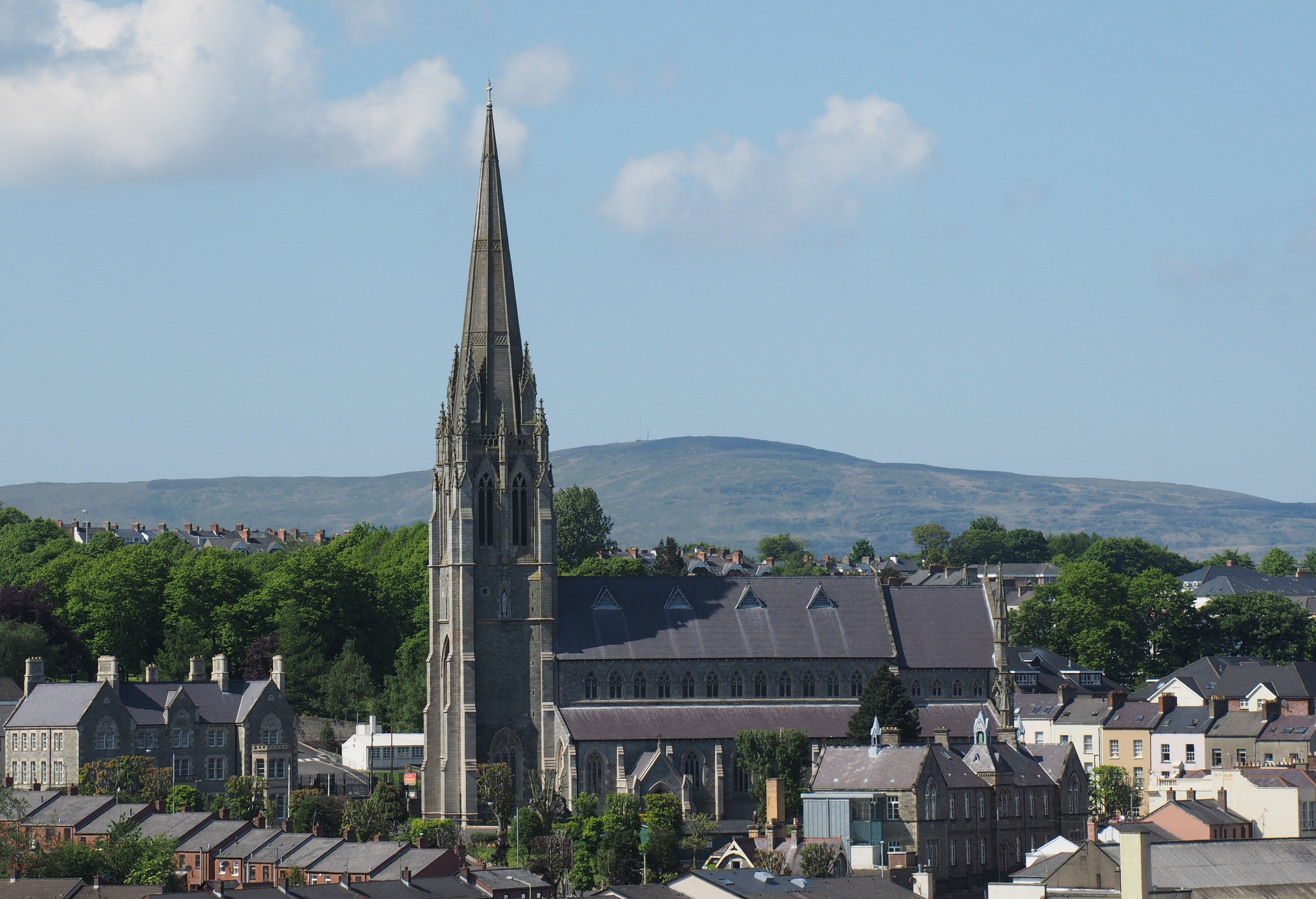
- St Eugene's Cathedral viewed from the walls of Derry

Location
- Country: Northern Ireland; Republic of Ireland
- Territory: Most of County Londonderry, some parishes in counties Tyrone and Antrim and County Donegal
- Ecclesiastical province: Province of Armagh
- Metropolitan: Archdiocese of Armagh
- Headquarters: Derry, County Londonderry, Northern Ireland, United Kingdom
- Coordinates: 54.995°N 7.326°W

Statistics
- Area: 2,500 km^{2} (970 sq mi)
- Population: Total; Catholics: (as of 2023); 328,545; 261,747 (79.7%)
- Parishes: 51
- Churches: 99

Information
- Denomination: Catholic Church
- Sui iuris church: Latin Church
- Rite: Roman Rite
- Established: 1158; 868 years ago
- Cathedral: St Eugene's Cathedral, Derry
- Patron saint: St Eugene and St Columba
- Secular priests: 100

Current leadership
- Pope: Leo XIV
- Bishop: Michael Router
- Metropolitan Archbishop: Eamon Martin
- Vicar General: Paul McCafferty & Monsignor Andy Dolan
- Bishops emeritus: Donal McKeown

Map
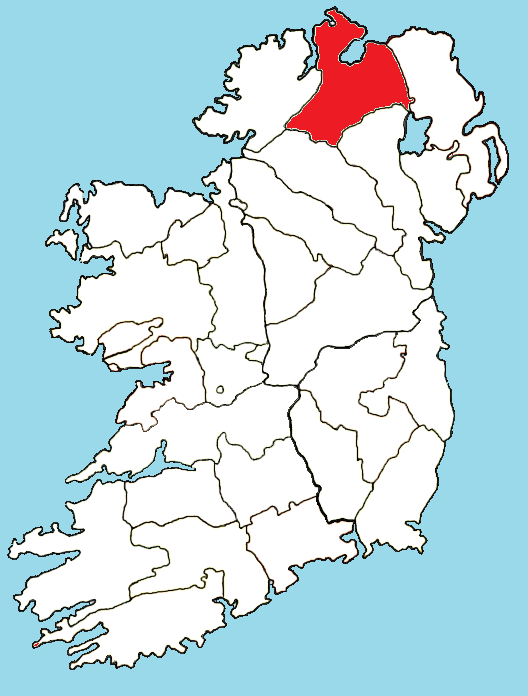

Website
- derrydiocese.org

The Diocese of Derry (Latin: Dioecesis Derriena; Irish: Deoise Dhoire) is a Latin Church diocese of the Catholic Church which in Ireland. It is in the ecclesiastical province of Armagh. The diocese was established in the year 1158. The diocese consists of almost fifty parishes and some number of religious congregations have houses in various parts of the diocese.

The Cathedral Church of the diocese is St Eugene's Cathedral. Nearby is St Columba's Church, Long Tower.

== Schools in the Diocese ==
Schools in the diocese include: St Columb's College, Thornhill College, St Joseph's Boys' School, Lumen Christi College.

== Adult Faith Development ==
As part of their adult faith development, the diocese runs the Diploma in Pastoral Theology validated by St. Patrick's College, Maynooth, from the Drumalis Retreat Centre.

The Derry Diocese Catechetical Centre in conjunction with St Mary's University, Twickenham offer a Masters in Catholic School Leadership.

== Geography ==
Derry contains most of County Londonderry, some parishes in counties Tyrone and Antrim and the Inishowen peninsula in County Donegal, and the parish of Lifford (Clonleigh) in East Donegal. As well as the city of Derry, the main towns are Buncrana, Coleraine, Lifford, Limavady, Maghera, Omagh and Strabane.

== Bishops ==
The following is a basic list of the post-Reformation Roman Catholic bishops and vicars apostolic.

- Réamonn Ó Gallchobhair (also known as Redmond O'Gallagher) (1569–1601)
- position vacant (1601–1622)
- Luke Rochford, vicar apostolic (appointed 1622)
- Terence Kelly, vicar apostolic (1629–1668)
- Eugene Conwell, vicar apostolic (appointed 1671)
- Bernard O'Cahan, vicar apostolic (1684–1711)
- Fergus Laurence Lea (1694–c. 1696)
- position vacant (1711–1720)
- Terence Donnelly (1720–unknown)
- Neil Conway (1727–1738)
- Michael O'Reilly (prelate) (1739–1749)
- John Brullaghhaun (1749–1750)
- Patrick Bradley, O.P. (1751–1752)
- John MacColgan (1752–1765)
- Phillip MacDevitt (1766–1797)
- Charles O'Donnell (1797–1824)
- Peter MacLaughlin (1824–1840)
- John MacLaughlin (1840–1864)
- Francis Kelly (1864–1889)
- John Keys O'Doherty (1889–1907)
- Charles MacHugh (1907–1926)
- Bernard O'Kane (1926–1939)
- Neil Farren (1939–1973)
- Edward Daly (1974–1993)
- Séamus Hegarty (1994–2011)
- position vacant (2011–2014)
- Donal McKeown (2014–2026)
- Michael Router (2026–Present)

== See also ==
- Diocese of Derry and Raphoe (Church of Ireland)
- Roman Catholicism in Ireland
- List of Roman Catholic dioceses in Northern Ireland
- Apostolic Nuncio to Ireland
