= Bernard O'Kane (bishop) =

Irish Roman Catholic bishop

The Most Reverend Bernard O'Kane
- Bishop of Derry
- Church: Catholic Church
- Diocese: Derry
- Appointed: 1926
- Term ended: 1939
- Predecessor: Charles Machugh
- Successor: Neil Farren

Orders
- Ordination: 18 May 1891
- Consecration: 26 Sept 1926 by Patrick O'Donnell

Personal details
- Born: 1 March 1867 Garvagh, United Kingdom
- Died: January 1939 Kilrea, Northern Ireland
- Motto: 'In Deo Spes Mea'

Styles of Bernard O'Kane
- Reference style: The Most Reverend
- Spoken style: Your Grace
- Religious style: Bishop

Bernard O'Kane was an Irish Roman Catholic priest and Bishop of Derry from 1926 to 1939.

== Early life and education ==
A native of Garvagh he was educated first at St Columb's College and then at St Patrick's College, Maynooth where he ordained in 1891. He spent two years post graduate study in the Dunboyne Establishment and joined the staff of St Columb's College in 1893.

He was a brilliant scientist, a regular contributor to technical journals on astronomy, light and radio waves and fascinated by the development of the modern wireless system. He served as College President from 1905 to 1919 when he was appointed Parish Priest of Maghera and, in time, Vicar General of the Diocese. He served there until his episcopal appointment in 1926 in succession to Charles MacHugh (bishop).

== Bishop of Derry ==
His appointment was a popular one and, given his experience in education, he made the provision of schools a key part of his pastoral work across his diocese, divided into two sovereign states by Partition of Ireland.

A social conservative, his 1932 Lenten Pastoral Letter he wrote of how the poteen trade had become a plague "which was raising a race of degenerates which was bringing no credit to our race.

He was a friend of Guglielmo Marconi.

== Death ==
He died at the residence of his niece Mrs P.F. Mooney in Kilrea after a long illness in January 1939 and the Irish Times reported that "10,000 men followed his coffin as it arrived back into his Cathedral city"
