= Trevor Britton =

Irish cricketer (born 1982)

Personal information
- Full name: Trevor Robert Samuel Britton
- Born: 23 July 1982 (age 44); Derry, Northern Ireland
- Batting: Right-handed
- Bowling: Right-arm off break

Career statistics
Competition	List A
Matches	3
Runs scored	8
Batting average	8.00
100s/50s	–/–
Top score	6*
Balls bowled	109
Wickets	0
Bowling average	–
5 wickets in innings	–
10 wickets in match	–
Best bowling	–
Catches/stumpings
- Source: Cricinfo, 4 January 2022

Trevor Britton (born 23 July 1982) is a cricketer from Derry, Northern Ireland. He is a right-handed batsman and a right-arm off-break bowler. He has participated in List A cricket since 2006. Britton participated in the 2006 EurAsia Cricket Series. He is a middle order batsman.

== Current career ==
He is currently captain of Bready Cricket Club and guided them into the semi-finals of the Northern Bank Senior Cup in July 2007 with a remarkable display of spin bowling, taking six wickets for seven runs in 6.5 overs.
