= John Brullaghhaun =

Styles of John Brullaghhaun
- Reference style: The Most Reverend
- Spoken style: Your Grace or Archbishop

John Brullaghhaun (John O'Brolchain) was an Irish prelate of the Roman Catholic Church in the mid 18th century.

Brullaghhaun was born in County Londonderry. He was educated at Douai, Flanders. He served as Bishop of Derry from 1749 until his death a year later.
