= Bishop of Derry =

Christian office in Ireland

The Bishop of Derry is an episcopal title which takes its name after the monastic settlement originally founded at Daire Calgach and later known as Daire Colm Cille, Anglicised as Derry. In the Catholic Church it remains a separate title, but in the Church of Ireland it has been united with another bishopric.

== History ==
At the Synod of Ráth Breasail in 1111 Ireland was divided up into ecclesiastical dioceses based on territorial units. One of these was for the Cenel Conaill who could have its Episcopal see either at Raphoe or Derry. At the Synod of Kells in 1152 however Derry and the Inishowen peninsula were moved from the diocese of the Cenel Conaill to that of the Cenel Eogain who controlled both areas. Derry was a Columban establishment founded by Columba who was a prince of the Cenel Conaill. It opposed many of the church reforms as well as being made part of the diocese of the Cenel Eogain. As a compromise the foundation of Derry was essentially made a diocese of its own within that of the Cenel Eogain and its comarb styled as the bishop of Derry.

In regards to the diocese of the Cenel Eogain, its see was at Rathlowry (Maghera), with the diocese in Latin became known as Rathlurensis and its bishop as Episcopis Rathlurensis. In 1246 its bishop, Germanus O'Carolan, obtained sanction from Pope Innocent IV to have the see transferred to Derry due to the remoteness of Rathlowry. By this stage the Columban foundation at Derry had become extinct and was replaced by the Augustinian Order. From 1254 the diocese became known as Derry and the bishop of the Cenel Eogain was styled as the bishop of Derry.

Following the Reformation, there are parallel apostolic successions. In the Church of Ireland, Derry continued a separate see until 1834 when it amalgamated with Raphoe and became the united bishopric of Derry and Raphoe.

In the Catholic Church, the title is still a separate bishopric. On 25 February 2014, Pope Francis appointed the then auxiliary Bishop of Down and Connor – Most Reverend Donal McKeown – as the new Bishop of Derry. He was installed as Bishop of Derry on Sunday 6 April 2014 in Saint Eugene's Cathedral Derry.

== Pre-Reformation bishops ==
Bishops of the diocese of Cinél nEógain

List of Bishops of the diocese of Cinél nEógain
From	Until	Incumbent	Notes
1107	1122	Máel Coluim Ua Brolcháin ^{[A]}	Styled "bishop of Ard Macha" (Armagh) in the Annals of Ulster, but probably took care over the see of Cinél nEógain. Consecrated on 13 September 1107. Died at Derry in 1122.
unknown	1139	Máel Brigte Ua Brolcháin ^{[B]}	Styled "bishop of Ard Macha" (Armagh) in the Annals of Ulster, but probably took care over the see of Cinél nEógain. Died on 29 January 1139.
unknown	1149	Ua Gormgaile	Died in office.
bef. 1152	1173	Muiredach Ua Cobthaig	Also known in Latin as Mauricius. Styled "bishop of Cenel-Eogain and of all the North of Ireland" in the Annals of Ulster. Present at the Synod of Kells in March 1152. Died on 10 February 1173.
unknown	1185	Amlaím Ua Muirethaig	Styled "bishop of Ard-Macha and Cenel-Feradhaigh" in the Annals of Ulster and appears to be reckoned as coarb of Saint Patrick in the Book of Leinster, but probably took care over the see of Cinél nEógain. Died at Cenél Feradaig Cruthnai in 1185 and buried at Derry.
1185	1230	Fogartach Ua Cerballáin I	Also known in Latin as Florentius. Died in office.
c. 1230	1254	Gilla in Choimded Ó Cerbailláin, O.P.	Also known in Latin as Germanus. Elected circa 1230. Transferred the See to Derry in 1254.

Pre-Reformation Bishops of Derry

List of pre-Reformation Bishops of Derry
From	Until	Incumbent	Notes
1254	1279	Gilla in Choimded Ó Cerbailláin, O.P.	Transferred the See from Ráith Lúraig (Maghera) in 1254. Died in office.
1280	1293	Fogartach Ua Cerballáin II	Also known in Latin as Florentius. Elected circa 1280. Died in office before 24 July 1293.
1293	1294	(Michael)	Previously Treasurer of Derry. Elected on 10 October 1293, and though granted possession of the see's temporalities on 8 February 1294, he was never consecrated.
1294	1297	Énri Mac Airechtaig, O.Cist.	Also known as Henry O'Reghly or Henry of Ardagh. Elected before 12 August 1294 and again before March 1294. Received possession of the temporalities on 16 June 1295. Died in office.
1297	c.1315	Gofraid Mac Lochlainn	Elected before 26 June 1297 and received possession of the temporalities after that date. Died in office circa 1315.
1316	1319	Áed Ó Néill	Elected in 1316. Died in office in June 1319.
1319	1349	Michael Mac Lochlainn, O.F.M.	Also known in Latin as Mauricius. Elected after 19 August 1319. Died in office before 18 December 1349.
1349	aft.1380	Simon, O.P.	Previously Bishop-elect of Clonmacnoise in earlier 1349. Appointed Bishop of Derry on 18 December 1349, but the date of his consecration is not known. Died in office after 1380.
unknown	1391	Johannes	Died in office before July 1391
1391	1394	John Dongan, O.S.B.	Previously Bishop of Mann and the Isles (1374–1387). Appointed before 11 July 1391. Acted as a suffragan bishop in the diocese of London (1392). Translated to Down on 16 September 1394.
1394		(Seoán Ó Mocháin)	Appointed on 16 September 1394, but did not take effect.
1398	1401	Aodh	Also known as Hugh. Appointed before 25 February 1398. Possibly resigned before August 1401.
1401	1415	Seoán Ó Flannabhra, O.Cist.	Previously bishop of Elphin (1326–1354) and abbot of Macosquin. Appointed bishop of Derry on 19 August 1401. Died in office before February 1415.
1415	1419	(Domhnall Mac Cathmhaoil)	Appointed on 20 February 1514, but was never consecrated, and died before October 1419.
1419	1429	Domhnall Ó Mearaich	Appointed on 16 October 1419. Translated to Connor on 9 December 1429.
1429	1433	Eoghan Ó Domhnaill	Also known in Latin as Eugenius. Translated from Connor on 9 December 1429. Died in office before September 1433.
1433	1458	Johannes Oguguin	Also known as Johnannes Ogubun. Appointed on 18 September and consecrated after 17 October 1433. Died in office before May 1458.
1458	1463	Bartholomaeus Ó Flannagáin, O.Cist.	Previously a monk in Assaroe Abbey. Appointed on 27 May 1458. Resigned in 1463.
1464	1466	Johannes	Died in office before April 1466.
1467	1484	Nicholas Weston	Appointed on 21 February 1467. Died in office in December 1484.
1485	1501	Domhnall Ó Fallamhain, O.F.M.	Appointed on 16 May 1485 and consecrated after July 1487. Died in office on 5 July 1501.
1503	1519	Séamus mac Pilib Mac Mathghamhna	Formerly Bishop-designate of Clogher in 1494. Appointed bishop of Derry on 26 November 1503. Died in office.
1520	1550/51	Ruaidhrí Ó Domhnaill	Also anglicised as Rory O'Donnell. Appointed on 11 January 1520. Died in office on 8 October 1550 (or 1551).
1550/51	1554	See vacant	
1554	1569	Eugene O'Doherty	Appointed on 25 June 1554. Died in office circa 1569.

== Post-Reformation bishops ==
=== Church of Ireland succession ===
List of Church of Ireland Bishops of Derry
From	Until	Incumbent	Notes
c.1569	1605	See vacant	Denis Campbell, Dean of Limerick, was nominated to be Bishop of Derry, Raphoe and Clogher in 1603, but died before consecration in July 1603.
1605	1609	George Montgomery	Nominated on 15 February and appointed by Letters Patent and 13 June 1605. Also was bishop of Clogher (1605–1621) and Raphoe (1605–1609). Translated to Meath on 8 July 1609.
1610	1611	Brutus Babington	Nominated on 11 August 1610 and consecrated in the same year. Died in office on 10 September 1611.
1613	1615	John Tanner	Formerly Bishop-designate of Dromore 1612–1613. Nominated bishop of Derry on 16 April and consecrated in May 1613. Died in office on 14 October 1615.
1616	1634	George Downham	Nominated on 28 October 1616 and consecrated in January 1617. Died in office on 17 April 1634.
1634	1661	John Bramhall	Nominated on 9 May and consecrated on 26 May 1634. Translated to Armagh on 18 January 1661.
1661	1665	George Wilde	Nominated on 6 August 1660 and consecrated on 27 January 1661. Died in office on 29 December 1665.
1666	1679	Robert Mossom	Nominated on 11 January and consecrated on 1 April 1666. Died in office on 21 December 1679.
1680	1681	Michael Ward	Translated from Ossory. Nominated on 6 January and appointed by letters patent on 22 January 1680. Died in office on 3 October 1681.
1681	1690	Ezekiel Hopkins	Translated from Raphoe. Nominated on 21 October and appointed by letters patent on 11 November 1681. Died in office on 22 June 1690.
1691	1703	William King	Nominated on 7 December 1690 and consecrated on 25 January 1691. Translated to Dublin on 11 March 1703.
1703	1713	Charles Hickman	Nominated on 17 February and consecrated on 11 June 1703. Died in office on 28 November 1713.
1714	1717	John Hartstonge	Translated from Ossory. Nominated on 7 February and appointed by letters patent on 3 March 1714. Died in office on 30 January 1717.
1717	1718	St George Ashe	Translated from Clogher. Nominated on 16 February and appointed by letters patent on 25 February 1717. Died in office on 27 February 1718.
1718	1727	William Nicolson	Translated from Carlisle. Appointed by letters patent on 2 May 1718. Translated to Cashel on 28 January 1727.
1727	1735	Henry Downes	Translated from Meath. Nominated on 11 January and appointed by letters patent on 8 February 1727. Died in office on 14 January 1735.
1735	1743	Thomas Rundle	Nominated on 20 February and consecrated on 3 August 1735. Died in office on 15 April 1743.
1743	1745	Carew Reynall	Translated from Down and Connor. Nominated on 25 April and appointed by letters patent on 6 May 1743. Died in office on 1 January 1745.
1745	1747	George Stone	Translated from Kildare. Nominated on 26 April and appointed by letters patent on 11 May 1745. Translated to Armagh on 13 March 1747.
1747	1768	William Barnard	Translated from Raphoe. Nominated on 28 February and appointed by letters patent on 19 March 1747. Died in office on 10 January 1768.
1768	1803	The Hon. Frederick Augustus Hervey	Translated from Cloyne. Nominated on 28 January and appointed by letters patent on 18 February 1768. Also became the fourth Earl of Bristol on 23 December 1779. Died in office on 8 July 1803.
1803	1831	The Hon. William Knox	Translated from Killaloe and Kilfenora. Nominated on 27 August and appointed by letters patent on 9 September 1803. Died in office on 10 July 1831.
1831	1853	The Hon. Richard Ponsonby	Translated from Killaloe and Kilfenora. Nominated on 14 September and appointed by letters patent on 21 September 1831. Became Bishop of Derry and Raphoe when the two sees were united on 5 September 1834. Died in office on 27 October 1853.
Since 1834		The Church of Ireland See is now part of the united bishopric of Derry and Raphoe	

=== Catholic succession ===
List of Roman Catholic Bishops of Derry
From	Until	Incumbent	Notes
1569	1601	Réamonn Ó Gallchobhair	Translated from Killala on 22 June 1569. Slain by soldiers, 15 March 1601, near Dungiven.
1601	1622	See vacant	No record of vicars apostolic appointed.
1622	unknown	(Luke Rochford)	Appointed vicar apostolic to administer the see by papal brief on 13 March 1622.
1629	1668	(Terence Kelly)	Appointed vicar apostolic to administer the see by papal brief 10 January 1629. Deprived of the post in 1668.
1671	unknown	(Eugene Conwell)	Appointed vicar apostolic to administer the see by papal brief 30 June 1671.
1684	c.1711	(Bernard O'Cahan)	Appointed vicar apostolic to administer the see by papal brief in January 1684. Died in office circa 1711.
1694	c.1696	Fergus Laurence Lea	Appointed on 8 February 1694, but it seems probable that he never took possession of the see. Also was appointed Apostolic Administrator of Raphoe on 18 February 1694. Died circa 1696.
1711	1720	See vacant	
1720	unknown	Terence Donnelly	Appointed on 5 January and consecrated on 27 March 1720. Death date unknown.
1727	1738	Neil Conway	Appointed on 7 April 1727. Died in office on 6 January 1738.
1739	1749	Michael O'Reilly	Appointed on 24 April 1739. Translated to Armagh on 23 January 1749.
1749	1750	John Brullaghhaun	Also known as John O'Brolchain. Appointed on 7 May 1749. Died in office in 1750.
1751	1752	Patrick Bradley, O.P.	Also known as Patrick O'Brolchain. Appointed on 29 January and consecrated on 3 March 1751. Resigned in 1752.
1752	1765	John MacColgan	Elected on 19 March and appointed by papal brief on 4 May 1752. Died in office in 1765.
1766	1797	Phillip MacDevitt	Appointed on 4 January 1766. Died in office on 24 November 1797.
1797	1824	Charles O'Donnell	Appointed coadjutor bishop on 11 (or 14) January 1797 and succeeded diocesan bishop on 24 November 1797. Died in office on 19 July 1824.
1824	1840	Peter MacLaughlin	Formerly Bishop of Raphoe (1802–1819). Appointed Administrator of Derry on 12 January 1819 due to Bishop O'Donnell's age and infirmity. Confirmed bishop of Derry on 4 April and by papal brief on 11 May 1824. Died in office on 18 August 1840.
1840	1864	John MacLaughlin	Appointed coadjutor bishop on 21 February and consecrated on 16 July 1837. Succeeded diocesan bishop on 18 August 1840. Resigned in 1864 and died on 18 June 1864.
1864	1889	Francis Kelly	Appointed coadjutor bishop on 19 April and consecrated on 21 October 1849. Succeeded diocesan bishop on 13 June 1864. Died in office on 1 September 1889.
1889	1907	John Keys O'Doherty	Appointed on 28 December 1889 and consecrated on 2 March 1890. Died in office on 25 February 1907.
1907	1926	Charles MacHugh (bishop)	Appointed on 14 June and consecrated on 29 September 1907. Died in office on 12 February 1926.
1926	1939	Bernard O'Kane	Appointed on 21 June and consecrated on 26 September 1926. Died in office on 5 January 1939.
1939	1973	Neil Farren	Appointed on 5 August and consecrated on 1 October 1939. Resigned on 14 April 1973 and died on 8 May 1980.
1974	1993	Edward Daly	Appointed on 31 January and consecrated on 31 March 1974. Resigned on 26 October 1993 and died on 8 August 2016
1994	2011	Séamus Hegarty	Translated from Raphoe. Appointed on 1 October and installed on 6 November 1994. Resigned for health reasons on 23 November 2011 and died on 20 September 2019.
2011	2014	See vacant	
2014	2026	Donal McKeown	Appointed on 25 February 2014 and installed on 6 April 2014
2026	Present	Micheal Router	Appointed July 16, 2026 and Installed on 20th September 2026

== Notes ==
- ^{A} ^{B} These two Ua Brolcháin bishops were members of the Cenél Feredaig, who were closely associated with Derry.
