= St Eugene's Cathedral =

Saint Eugene's Cathedral
- Cathedral Church of Saint Eugene
- Ardeaglais Naomh Eoghan
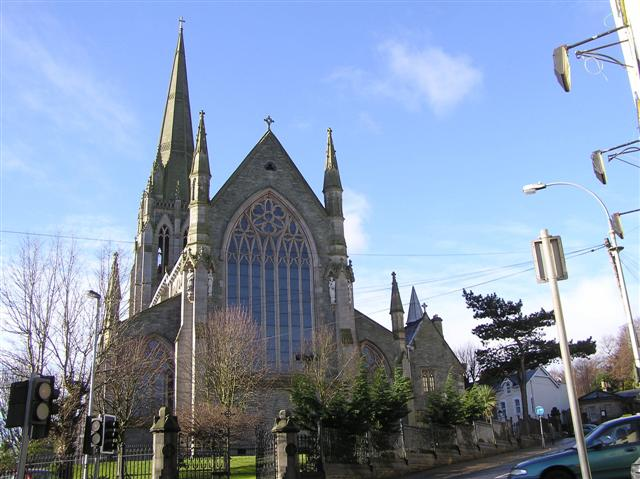
- Rear chancel

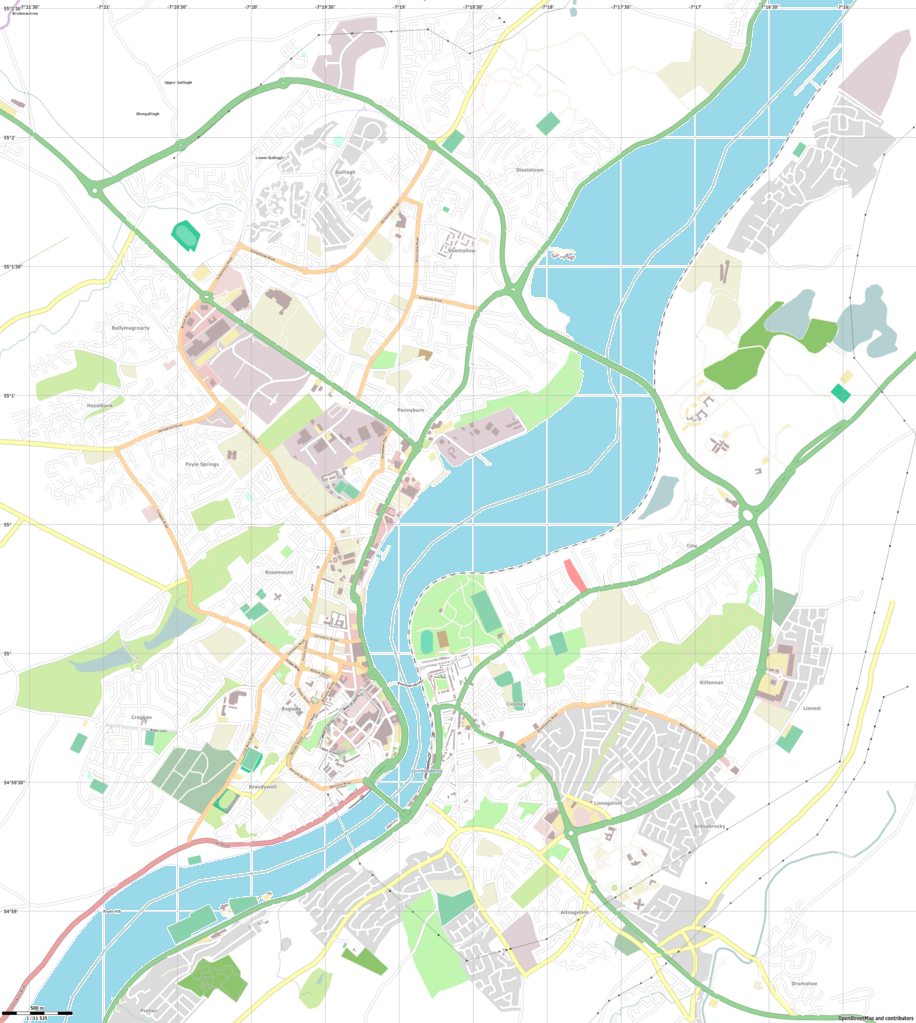
- Shown within Derry Saint Eugene's Cathedral (island of Ireland)
- 55°00′00″N 7°19′42″W
- Location: Creggan Street, Derry
- Country: Northern Ireland
- Language: English
- Denomination: Roman Catholic
- Tradition: Roman Rite
- Website: steugenescathedral.com

History
- Dedication: Eógan of Ardstraw
- Consecrated: 21 April 1936

Architecture
- Functional status: Active
- Architect: James Joseph McCarthy
- Style: Gothic Revival
- Years built: 1849–1903
- Groundbreaking: 1849
- Completed: 19 June 1903

Administration
- Province: Armagh
- Diocese: Derry
- Parish: Templemore

Clergy
- Bishop: Michael Router

St Eugene's Cathedral (Irish: Ardeaglais Naomh Eoghan) is the Roman Catholic cathedral located in Derry, Northern Ireland. It is the "Mother Church" for the Roman Catholic Diocese of Derry, as well as the parish Church of the parish of Templemore.

== History ==
It was not until the passage of the Roman Catholic Relief Act 1829 that the possibility of building a Roman Catholic cathedral in Derry could be contemplated. Fundraising for the building of the cathedral took place from 1840. Work began on the construction of the cathedral in 1849. The cathedral's location is next to Francis Street and Creggan Street in Derry. The total cost of building the cathedral amounted to just over £40,000.

Money was raised not just in Derry and Ireland, but also in America where around £4,000 was raised. The architect commissioned to design the cathedral was James Joseph McCarthy who had already built numerous cathedrals across Ireland. The plan of the cathedral is a simple neo-Gothic expression.

The cathedral was officially opened on 4 May 1873 by the then Bishop of Derry, Francis Kelly. The project to build the cathedral's bell tower and spire was postponed, as no funds were available for the project. At first, the cathedral's windows were made of plain glass due to lack of funds. It was not until the late 1890s when stained glass windows were installed. Work on the bell tower and spire began on 13 August 1900, with the building contract awarded to Courtney and Co from Belfast. Work was completed on 19 June 1903.

== Post Vatican II changes ==
The changes to the Roman Catholic liturgy in 1962/1964 meant that the sanctuary of the cathedral had to be reorganised. In May 1964 a temporary wooden altar was placed in the sanctuary to accommodate the mass being said in English and facing the congregation.

Further temporary work was carried out in late 1975 with the addition of a larger wooden altar on a newly extended wooden sanctuary floor, the removal of the altar rails and the removal of the smaller pulpit on the cathedral's left-hand side of the sanctuary whilst retaining the main pulpit located at the right-hand side of the cathedral sanctuary. The wooden statues which adorned the main large pulpit's large canopy were removed and placed at other locations in the cathedral sanctuary just in time before Christmas Midnight Mass was transmitted live via Eurovision from the cathedral.

In 1984 fundraising began for the renovation work to the cathedral, which its main structure was over a hundred years old and in desperate need of repair. From 1984 until 1988, exterior renovation work took place on the cathedral with the extension of the sacristy and the building of a brand new conference room.

In June 1989 the cathedral was closed for six months for a permanent reorganisation of the sanctuary. The old temporary fittings were removed and a new sanctuary floor made from Sardinian granite was completed. A new square altar made from Carrara marble was made and installed in the sanctuary under the chancel arch.

The old pulpit was taken out and a brand new lectern made of marble was installed. The celebrant's chair and tabernacle stand were all made from Carrara and Macedonian marble. A new tabernacle was made in silver-plated bronze, and was constructed by a Kilkenny silversmith, Peter Donovan.

A new secondary porch was created in the main entrance in the 1989 renovations along with a new small porch in the North aisle. The main high altar table was taken out, however, the original reredos which was installed in 1904, was kept.

A new lighting scheme was installed, to give the cathedral more brightness and warmth which it had lacked for many years. A new sound system was also installed which gave the cathedral excellent amplification. The whole interior of the cathedral was redecorated.

The cathedral's brand new interior was opened and consecrated by the then Bishop of Derry, Edward Daly on 17 December 1989.

On Monday 25 May 2015, extensive refurbishment and renovation work commenced in the cathedral. Details of the refurbishment and renovation work which would be undertaken in the cathedral in the coming months ahead was outlined in their parish bulletin.

"As custodians of this sacred, listed building of St Eugene’s Cathedral, it has become necessary to carry out essential repairs and refurbishment primarily associated with damage caused by the entrance of moisture to the fabric of the building. This is affecting internal finishes, stained glass windows and external masonry (ie St Columba’s and St Patrick’s windows). The damp entering the aisle wall at the choir is causing large sections of internal plaster to boast. The spiral staircase to the bell tower is cracked and unsafe. The existing wrought iron ladder and platform to the spire from the bell tower are unsafe and as a result, the spire parapet gutter has not been maintained for several years. The works will cost £353,480. The works will begin on Monday, 25th May and will continue for 20 weeks. The main contractor is Stewart & McConnell, Derry (lowest tender)".

On the week of 16 November 2015, restoration work on the cathedral concluded.

== Current use ==
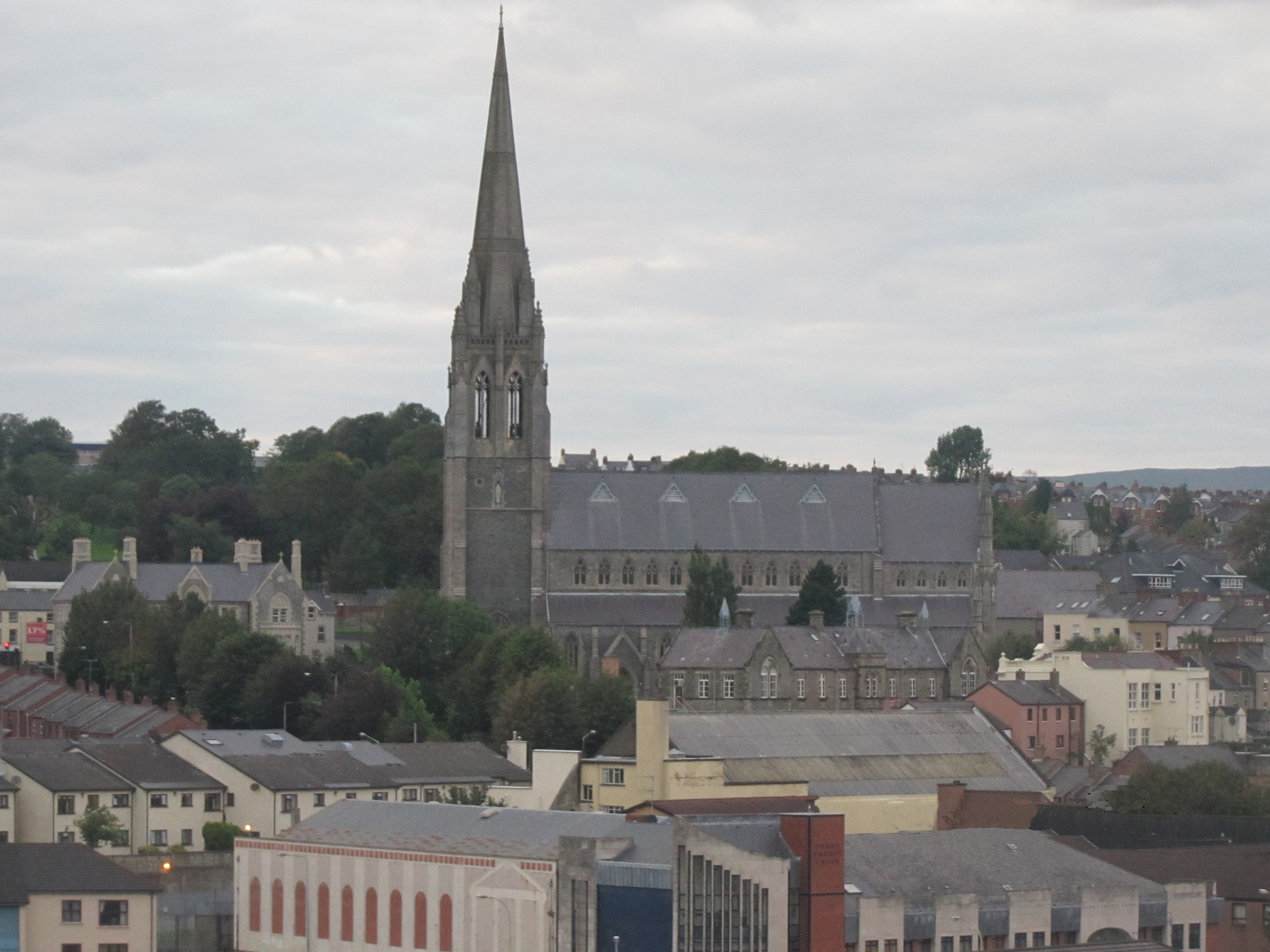
St Eugene's Cathedral, August 2011

During Holy Week of 2013, the Good Friday liturgy and the Easter Vigil celebration was broadcast live from the cathedral on television by the Republic of Ireland state broadcaster RTE, with both ceremonies transmitted across Europe through Eurovision. The broadcasts were made to celebrate the City of Derry being the 2013 UK City of Culture.

On Sunday 13 December 2015, the bishop of Derry, Donal McKeown, opened a "Holy Door" in the cathedral to commence the extraordinary Jubilee Year of Mercy in the Roman Catholic Church, which ran until Sunday 20 November 2016. The "Holy Door" is the main entrance door to the cathedral. The entrance porch has been completely refurbished. On entering the porch you are now greeted by eight newly positioned oak statues of Saints Columba, Patrick, Matthew, Mark, Luke, John, Mary and Joseph. These statues used to be part of the canopy of the old pulpit in the cathedral from 1906 to 1989.

A stone statue of Saint Eugene adorns the outside of the entrance porch embedded in the main bell tower of the cathedral; it has been there since the cathedral was built in 1873. On the newly refurbished porch the words from the prophet Isaiah, "Do not be afraid I have redeemed you and called you by your name. You are mine", are engraved on the wall. On Sunday 13 November 2016, Bishop Donal McKeown officially closed the "Holy Door" to mark the end of the Jubilee Year of Mercy which concluded on Sunday 20 November 2016 in the Roman Catholic Church.

On Monday 8 August 2016, the retired bishop of Derry Edward Daly died at the age of 82. His remains were brought to the cathedral that evening, and over a period of two and a half days, an estimated 25,000 people came to pay their last respects to Bishop Daly's remains which lay at rest inside the cathedral on public display. His funeral mass took place in the cathedral on Thursday 11 August 2016, where over a thousand people packed into the cathedral. Irish President Michael D Higgins, Deputy First Minister Martin McGuinness and representatives of the Queen, the British and Irish governments and City of Derry dignitaries, including Deputy Mayor Jim McKeever, were also present. The sitting mayor alderman Hillary McClintock from the DUP didn't attend the funeral due to unforeseen circumstances. But paid tribute to Bishop Daly by article and opened a book of condolences in the Guildhall.

The current bishop of Derry, Most Reverend Donal McKeown, was the celebrant of the Requiem Mass, which was concelebrated by the Primate of All Ireland, Derry-born Archbishop Eamon Martin, retired archbishop of Armagh Sean Brady, other bishops and clergy from across the Derry Diocese and around Ireland. Representatives of the other Christian churches in Derry City, including former Church of Ireland Bishop of Derry and Raphoe – James Mehaffey, who was very close friends with Bishop Daly – attended.

Immediately after the Requiem Mass, Bishop Daly was buried in a plot located within the grounds of the cathedral alongside his predecessor Bishop Neil Farren, Bishop of Derry from 1939 to 1973, who was buried there in 1980.

In November 2016, the old confessional rooms in the cathedral which were built and opened in 1989 were closed and new confessionals which were constructed at the back of the cathedral near the main entrance doors during the summer of 2016, were opened. This was done to encourage people who enter the cathedral through the main entrance doors to think about going to confession. It also made it easier for people, having the confessionals located at the back of the cathedral and not away up near the top of the cathedral, adjacent to the sacristy. The new confessionals were blessed by Bishop Donal McKeown at Sunday Mass on 20 November 2016.

The area which was the old confessional rooms since 1989 was converted into a new side chapel dedicated to Saint Mother Teresa of Calcutta. The new chapel was blessed and dedicated by the Bishop of Derry, Donal McKeown, during the cathedral parish's annual nine-day Novena to Saint Therese of Lisieux. On Friday 12 May 2017 at a special prayer service at 7:30 pm in the cathedral, parishioners and clergy were joined by nuns from Mother Teresa's order, who joined the packed congregation in the cathedral for Evening Prayer and a special dedication ceremony for the new chapel. Today the chapel is used by prayer groups, and on Sunday mornings during the 11:00 am Mass it is used for the children's liturgy.

In 2023, the cathedral celebrated its 150th anniversary. To celebrate this special occasion, a new statue was installed in the cathedral of Blessed Carlo Acutis. A diocesan mass to celebrate the anniversary was held on Sunday 30 April 2023 and a special anniversary mass for the cathedral parish was celebrated on Thursday 4 May 2023, on the same date the cathedral opened its doors in 1873.

== Organs ==
The organ has always been located in a west-end gallery. The original organ was built by Telford of Dublin and installed in 1873. In the mid-1950s this instrument was replaced with an 11-rank extension organ by the John Compton Organ Company of London. Only for the cathedral's extremely lively acoustic, the instrument is of questionable musical quality. No pipes are visible, which detracts greatly from the overall appearance of the West end. The fine stone-carved gallery and rose window above, are marred by what looks more like a loudspeaker cabinet than an organ. By the late 1990s, this organ had fallen into only sporadic use, with the main Sunday services being accompanied by a Johannus electronic instrument located in the south aisle.

== The cathedral today ==
Saint Eugene's Cathedral forms part of the Parish of Templemore in the city of Derry, which also includes Saint Columba's Church, Long Tower.

The Bishop of Derry – Most Reverend Donal McKeown is the Parish Priest of the Templemore Parish. Bishop McKeown was installed as Bishop of Derry in the cathedral on Sunday 6 April 2014.

The bells of the cathedral can be heard over the Derry area each day at 8:00am, 12:00pm, 6:00pm and 9:00pm, ringing out seasonal tunes and calling parishioners to masses.

As of March 2025, the cathedral parish covers a Catholic population of 12,140.

== Cathedral clergy ==
As of March 2025, Saint Eugene's Cathedral is served by the following clergy:

Parish Priest – Bishop of Derry, Most Reverend Donal McKeown

Administrator – Father Paul Farren

Curate – Father Shaun Doherty

Assisting Priest – Father Colum Clerkin

== Cathedral timetable ==
As of March 2025, Saint Eugene's Cathedral timetable is outlined below:

Mass Times

- Sundays at 6:15 pm and 7:30 pm Vigil Masses on Saturday evenings; 7:00 am, 9:30 am, 11:00 am, 12:30 pm and 7:00 pm on Sundays
- Holyday of Obligation at 6:15 pm and 7:30 pm Vigil Masses on the day before; 7:00 am, 9:30 am, 11:00 am, 12:30 pm and 7:30 pm on the Holyday
- Masses on a Holy day can be altered, so check the parish website for details
- Mondays to Fridays Masses at 8:00 am, 10:00 am and 7:30 pm
- Saturday mornings at 10:00 am
- During the season of Lent, an extra Mass is held at 1:00 pm Mondays to Fridays

Confessions

- Saturdays from 11:30 am – 1:00 pm, 5:30 pm – 6:00 pm and from 7:00 pm – 7:20 pm
- Day before Holydays from 5:30 pm – 6:00 pm and 7:00 pm – 7:20 pm
- Mondays to Fridays from 7:00 pm – 7:20 pm

Eucharistic Adoration

- Tuesdays from after the 10:00 am Mass until 7:25 pm
- Sundays from 3:00 pm – 6:00 pm, concluding with devotions at 6:00 pm
- Mondays to Fridays Eucharistic Adoration, Rosary and Night Prayer is held from 8:00 pm to 8:30 pm
- Angelus and Rosary recited Mondays to Fridays at 12.00pm
- Chaplet of Divine Mercy recited Mondays to Fridays at 3.00pm

Full details of all Mass times, confessions, and special ceremonies including extra services for Advent, Christmas, Lent and Easter are available on the cathedral parish website – www.steugenescathedral.com

== See also ==
- St Columb's Cathedral in Diocese of Derry and Raphoe (Church of Ireland)
- Roman Catholic Diocese of Derry
