= St. Columba's Church =

St. Columba's Church, St. Kolumba, and similar names may refer to:

== Australia ==
- St Columba's Anglican Church, Hawthorn, Adelaide, South Australia
- St Columba's Presbyterian Church, Perth, Western Australia

== Ireland ==
- St Columba's Church, Burtonport, County Donegal
- St Columba's Church, Ennis, County Clare
- St Columba's Church, Glenswilly, County Donegal

== United Kingdom ==
- Downing Place United Reformed Church, Cambridge, result of a merger between the former St Columba's and Emmanuel Churches
- St. Columba's Cathedral, Oban, Scotland
- St Columba's Catholic Church, Glasgow
- St Columba's Church, Edinburgh (disambiguation), several churches in Edinburgh
- St Columba's Church, Aignish, Western Isles (disused)
- St Columba's Church, Canna, Inner Hebrides
- St Columba's Church, Chester, Cheshire
- St Columba's Church, London
- St Columba's Church, Long Tower, Northern Ireland
- St Columba's Church, Warcop, Cumbria
- St Columba's Church of Scotland, Glasgow
- St Columba's United Reformed Church, Oxford
- St Columba's United Reformed Church, York

== United States ==
- St. Columba's Church, Newark, New Jersey
- St. Columba's Church (Hopewell Junction, New York)
- St. Columba Church (Saint Paul, Minnesota)

== Others ==
- St. Columba's Chapel (Middletown, Rhode Island)
- St. Kolumba, Cologne, Germany
