= St Columba's =

St Columba's may refer to:

== Churches ==
- Cathedral of St. Eunan and St Columba, Letterkenny, Ireland
- St Columba's-by-the-Castle, Edinburgh, Scotland
- St. Columba's Cathedral, Oban, Scotland
- St. Columba's Chapel (Middletown, Rhode Island), United States
- St Columba's Church, Chester, England
- St Columba's Church, Ennis, Ireland
- St Columba's Church, London, England
- St Columba's Church, Long Tower, Northern Ireland
- St. Columba's Church, Newark, New Jersey, United States
- St Columba's Presbyterian Church, Perth, Western Australia
- St Columba Church of Scotland, Glasgow, Scotland
- St. Columba Cathedral (Youngstown, Ohio), United States
- St. Columba Presbyterian Church, Vancouver, Canada

== Schools and colleges ==
- St Columba’s Catholic Boys’ School, Bexleyheath, England
- St Columba's College, Dublin, Ireland
- St. Columba's College, Hazaribagh, India
- St. Columba's College, Largs, Scotland
- St. Columba's College, Melbourne, Australia
- St Columba's College, St Albans, England
- St Columba's High School, Clydebank, Scotland
- St Columba's High School, Gourock, Scotland
- St Columba's High School, New South Wales, Australia
- St. Columba's R.C. High School, Dunfermline, Scotland
- St. Columba's School, Delhi, India
- St Columba's School, Kilmacolm, Scotland

== Sports ==
- Mullinalaghta St. Columba's GAA, based in County Longford, Ireland
- St. Columba’s Hurling Club merged with St. Agnes’s Football Club in 1969 to form what is now Crumlin GAA
- Urney St. Columba's GAC based in County Tyrone, Northern Ireland

== See also ==
- Columba (disambiguation)
- St Columb (disambiguation)
- Kolumba
