= Cloughleigh =

Cloghleagh an Chloch Liath
- Populated place
- Location in Ireland
- Coordinates: 52°50′37″N 8°59′33″W
- Country: Ireland
- Province: Munster
- County: Clare

Government
  - Dáil Éireann: Clare
- Time zone: UTC+0 (WET)
  - Summer (DST): UTC-1 (IST (WEST))

Cloughleigh, officially Cloghleagh (Irish: an Chloch Liath), is a townland and residential area of Ennis, County Clare, Ireland.

It is mostly made up of bungalows, semi-detached houses and terraced houses. There is a community centre, playing fields and a playground in the estate, as well as a national school, which is financed directly by the State, but administered jointly by the State, a patron body, and local representatives. Nearby estates include Hermitage and Waterpark View.

Cloughleigh falls within Ennis parish, and benefits from the local Church of Christ the King. Opened in 1978, it is one of the smallest churches in the parish.

The community centre now houses Cloughleigh Youth Club. The club was founded in 1986 and originally met in a prefab for a number of years before moving to the community centre. Activities on offer include football, hockey, and dodgeball, arts and crafts, dancing, debates and quizzes. Members also participate in overseas exchanges, and staffing of a summer camp for twenty-five children between the ages of seven and ten.

The RAPID Project in Cloughleigh, part of the Irish Government's drive for regeneration of deprived areas, was named one of the principal winners in Co-operation Ireland's annual Pride of Place Competition 2007.

Most primary school students attend Cloughleigh National School, which is located on the estate. Other students attend Ennis National School or the other primary schools throughout Ennis.

== See also ==
- Roslevan, Ennis
- Battle of Cloughleagh
