= St Columba's Church, Glasgow =

St Columba Church, Glasgow may refer to:

- St Columba's Catholic Church, Glasgow in Woodside, Glasgow
- St Columba Church of Scotland, Glasgow on Vincent Street, Glasgow

== See also ==
- St. Columba's Church (disambiguation)
