= Ennis Town Hall =

Municipal building in Ennis, County Clare, Ireland

- Halla Baile Inse
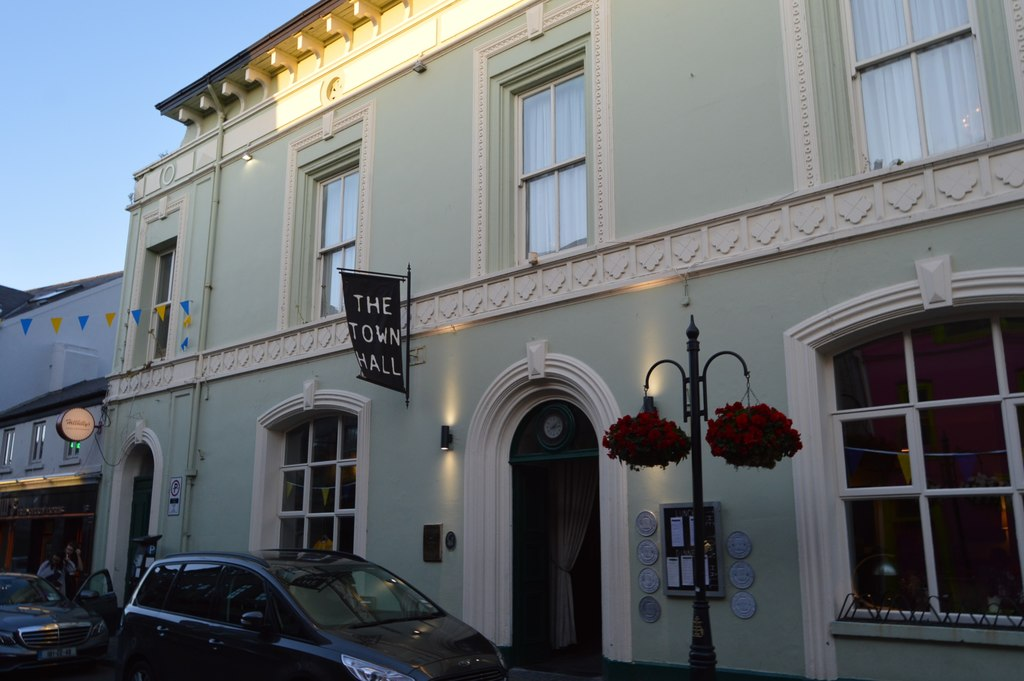
- Ennis Town Hall

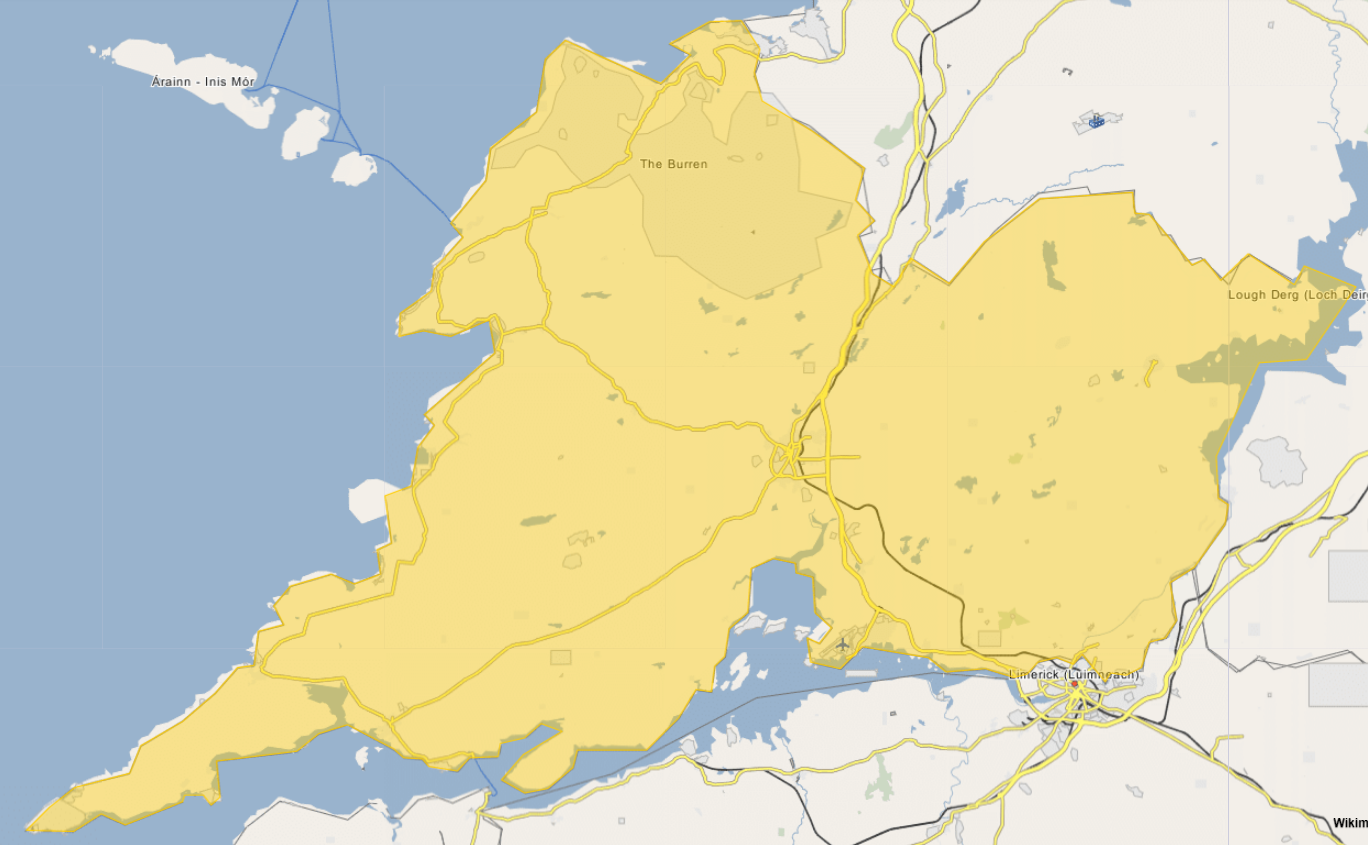
- Location within County Clare

General information
- Architectural style: Neoclassical style
- Location: O'Connell Street, Ennis, Ireland
- Coordinates: 52.8425°N 8.9831°W
- Completed: c.1850

Ennis Town Hall (Irish: Halla Baile Inse) is a municipal building in O'Connell Street, Ennis, County Clare, Ireland. The building accommodated the offices of Ennis Urban District Council until 1965 but is now used as the banqueting suite of a local hotel.

== History ==
In the mid-19th century civic leaders decided to commission a town hall for Ennis. The site they selected was occupied by the local police barracks which itself had been formed by converting the old county gaol. In the early 19th century, the county gaol had been used as a holding facility for prisoners who were about to be transported to parts of Australia such as Tasmania. The new building was designed in the neoclassical style, built in brick with a cement render and was completed in around 1850.

The design involved a broadly symmetrical main frontage of five bays facing onto Jail Street (now O'Connell Street). The central and outer bays contained round headed doorways with archivolts and keystones, while the second and fourth bays contained segmental headed windows with archivolts and keystones. The first floor was fenestrated by six square-headed recessed sash windows with architraves and keystones. There was a frieze decorated by a series of barbed quatrefoils above the ground floor and a frieze decorated by a series of roundels above the first floor. At roof level, there were prominent eaves supported by brackets. Internally, the principal room was the assembly room on the first floor (now known as the Banner Room).

Ennis was granted town commissioners under the Towns Improvement (Ireland) Act 1854, and the commissioners and their successors, the urban district council, formed under the Local Government (Ireland) Act 1898, met in the town hall. During the First World War, films were shown in the town hall: the Bishop of Killaloe, Michael Fogarty, complained about the "pictures shown in the town hall", or as he put it, "in that hell shop". The building also became an important venue for public events. The political leader, Éamon de Valera, was a regular visitor to the town hall. He gave a briefing in the town hall on the political situation just two days before the signing of the Anglo-Irish Treaty in December 1921.

In 1963, the Regan family, who owned a town house at No. 1 Bindon Road, entered into an asset swap with the urban district council whereby the council acquired No. 1 Bindon Road for use as their new headquarters, and the Regan family acquired the town hall for use as a banqueting suite for the Old Ground Hotel, which they already owned and which was located just to the south of the town hall. The Old Ground Hotel, and the town hall, subsequently changed hands three times being acquired by Kingston Windsor Hotels in 1967, Strand Hotels in 1970, and Flynn Hotel Group in 1995.

The professional boxer, Muhammad Ali, having discovered that his maternal great-grandfather, Abe Grady, emigrated from Ennis to the US in the 1860s, toured the town and visited the town hall in September 2009.
