= Roslevan, Ennis =

Suburb of Ennis, County Clare, Ireland

Coordinates: 52°51′24.45″N 8°57′40.04″W

Roslevan is a residential area on the eastern side of Ennis, County Clare, Ireland. The area has many housing estates such as Oakleigh Wood, Cappahard, and Corrovorin. There are two council housing estates in the area, called Bridgecourt and Bridgeview. It was expected that by 2012 the area would have a population of 7,000.

The Area includes the €10 million Roslevan Shopping Centre which opened in April 2005. The shopping centre includes a butcher, pharmacy, Off Licence, pub, bookmakers, Chinese restaurant, gym and a Supervalu supermarket.

A development is currently underway in the area that includes 10 acres (40,000 m^{2}) of parkland with lakes, riverside walks, and woodlands included.

Primary education is mainly provided by Knockanean National School in nearby Knockanean, and by various other primary schools in Ennis.

== See also ==
- Cloughleigh
- List of towns and villages in Ireland
