= St Columba's Church, Edinburgh =

St Columba's Church, Edinburgh may refer to:

- St Columba's-by-the-Castle, an Episcopal church in the Old Town
- St Columba's Catholic Church, Edinburgh, a Roman Catholic church in Newington
- St Columba's Gaelic Church, a former Scottish Gaelic-speaking of the Church of Scotland in Tollcross

== See also ==
- St. Columba's Church (disambiguation)
