= Fall line (topography) =

Mountain or hill direction

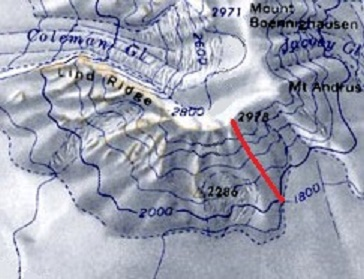
Contour map with an example fall line. Contour lines of constant elevation are blue. One example fall line is red.

A fall line refers to the line down a mountain or hill which is most directly downhill; that is, the direction a ball or other body would accelerate if it were free to move on the slope under gravity. Mathematically the fall line, the line of greatest slope, is the negative of the gradient (which points uphill) and perpendicular to the contour lines.

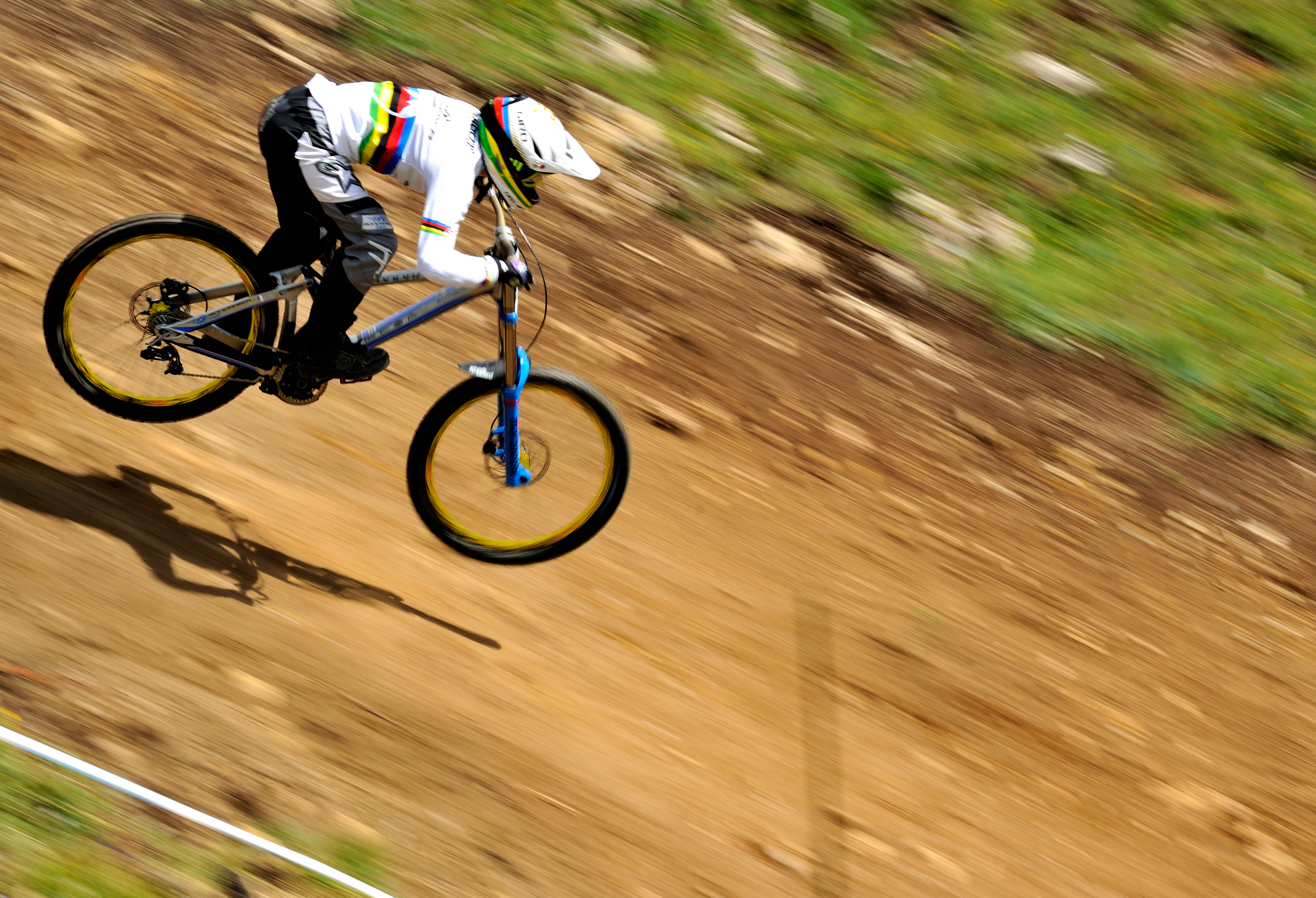
A mountain biker riding a trail which follows the fall line.

In mountain biking, a trail follows the "fall line" if it generally descends in the most downward direction, rather than traversing in a sideways direction. A skier is said to be "skiing the fall line" if they are moving generally down, making turns either side of the fall line, rather than moving across the slope.

== See also ==
- Glossary of cycling
- Ridge line
- Topography
- Topographic profile
- Gradient descent
