= Topographic profile =

Example of topographic profile

A topographic profile or topographic cut or elevation profile is a representation of the relief of the terrain that is obtained by cutting transversely the lines of a topographic map. Each contour line can be defined as a closed line joining relief points at equal height above sea level. It is usually drawn on the same horizontal scale as the map, but the use of an exaggerated vertical scale is advisable to underline the elements of the relief. This can vary according to the slope and amplitude of the terrestrial relief, but is usually three to five times the horizontal scale.

A series of parallel profiles, taken at regular intervals on a map, can be combined to provide a more complete three-dimensional view of the area that appears on the topographic map. It is evident that, thanks to computer science, more sophisticated three-dimensional models of the landscape can be made from digital terrain data.

The line of the plane defined by the points that limit the profile is called the guideline and the horizontal line of comparison on which the profile is constructed is called base.

== Applications ==
One of the most important applications of the topographic profiles is in the construction of works of great length and small width, for example roads, sewers or pipelines.

Sometimes topographical profiles appear in printed maps, such as those designed for navigation routes, excavations and especially for geological maps, where they are used to show the internal structure of the rocks that populate a territory.

People who study natural resources such as geologists, geomorphologists, soil scientists and vegetation scholars, among others, build profiles to observe the relationship of natural resources to changes in topography and analyze numerous problems.

A river or stream gradient may be derived from its elevation profile by means of numerical differentiation.

== See also ==
- Fall line (topography)
