= Ennis =

County town of County Clare, Ireland

Ennis Inis (Irish)
- Town
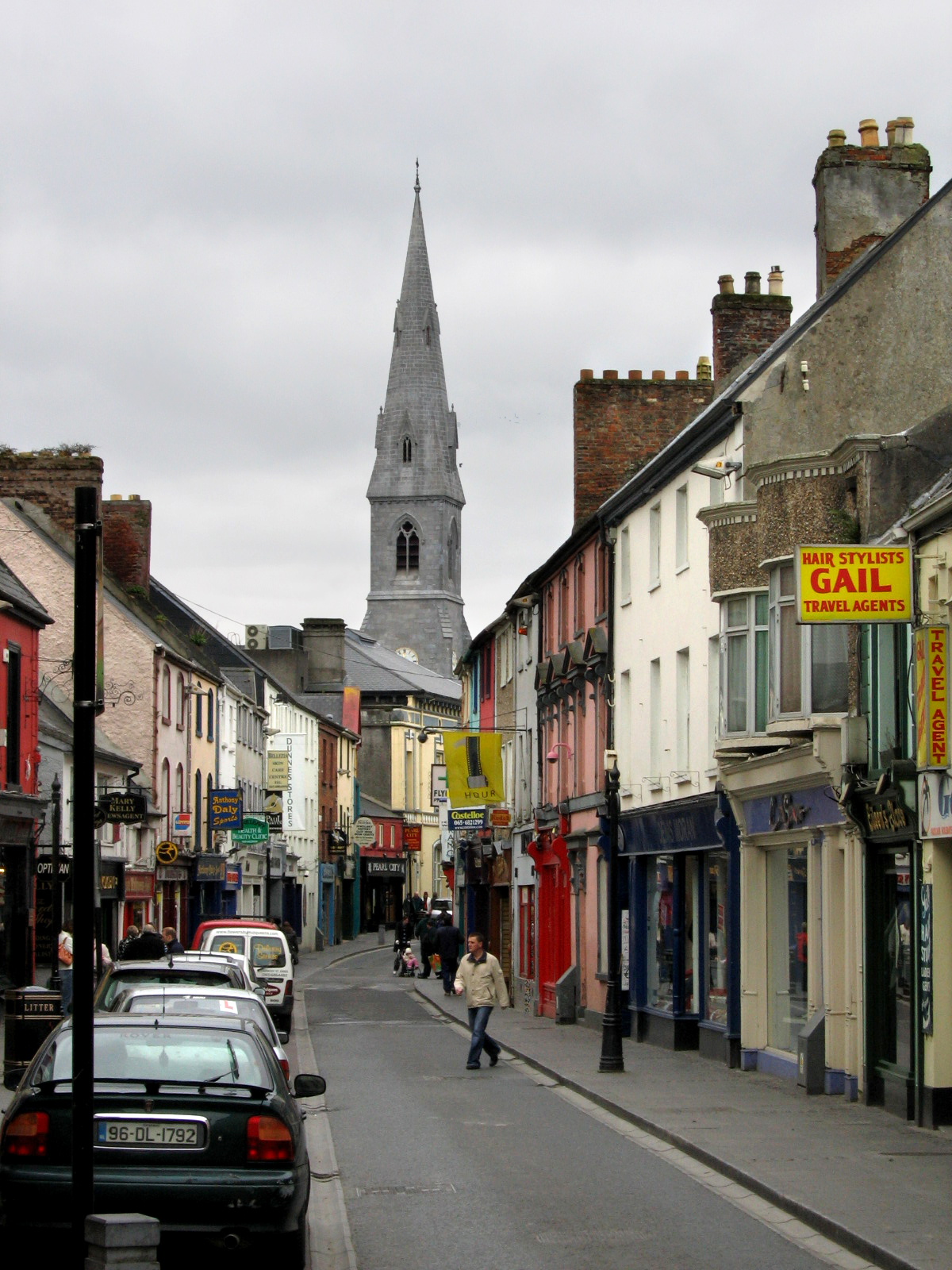
- O'Connell Street, 2005

- Coat of arms

- Location in Ireland Ennis (Europe)
- Coordinates: 52.8463°N 8.9807°W
- Country: Ireland
- Province: Munster
- County: County Clare
- Baronies: Islands and Bunratty Upper

Government
  - Dáil constituency: Clare
- Elevation: 3 m (9.8 ft)

Population (2022 census)
  - Rank: 11th
  - Urban: 27,923
- Demonym: Ennisman/Enniswoman
- Time zone: UTC±0 (WET)
  - Summer (DST): UTC+1 (IST)
- Eircode routing key: V95
- Telephone area code: +353(0)65
- Irish Grid Reference: R333780
- Website: www.visitennis.com

Ennis (Irish: Inis [ˈɪnʲɪʃ], meaning 'island' or 'river meadow') is the county town of County Clare, in the mid-west of Ireland. The town lies on the River Fergus, north of where the river widens and enters the Shannon Estuary. Ennis is the largest town in County Clare, with a population of 27,923, making it the 6th largest town, and 11th largest urban settlement in Ireland, as of the 2022 census. Dating from the 12th century the town's Irish name is short for Irish: Inis Cluana Rámhfhada, meaning 'Island of the long rowing meadow', deriving from its location between two courses of the River Fergus.

Ennis has had considerable success in the Irish Tidy Towns competition. In 2005 and 2021, the town was named Ireland's tidiest town, and was named Ireland's tidiest large urban centre on multiple occasions.

The town straddles two baronies. Most of the town, including its historic centre, is in the Barony of Islands. However, the eastern and north-eastern edges of the town are in the Barony of Bunratty Upper.

== History ==
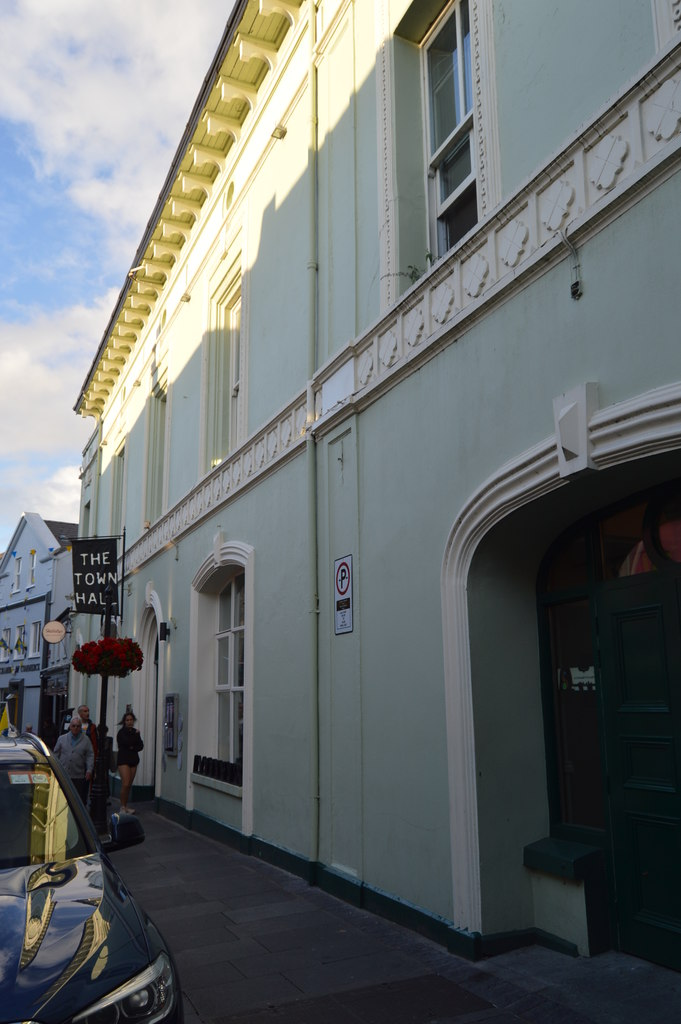
Ennis Town Hall

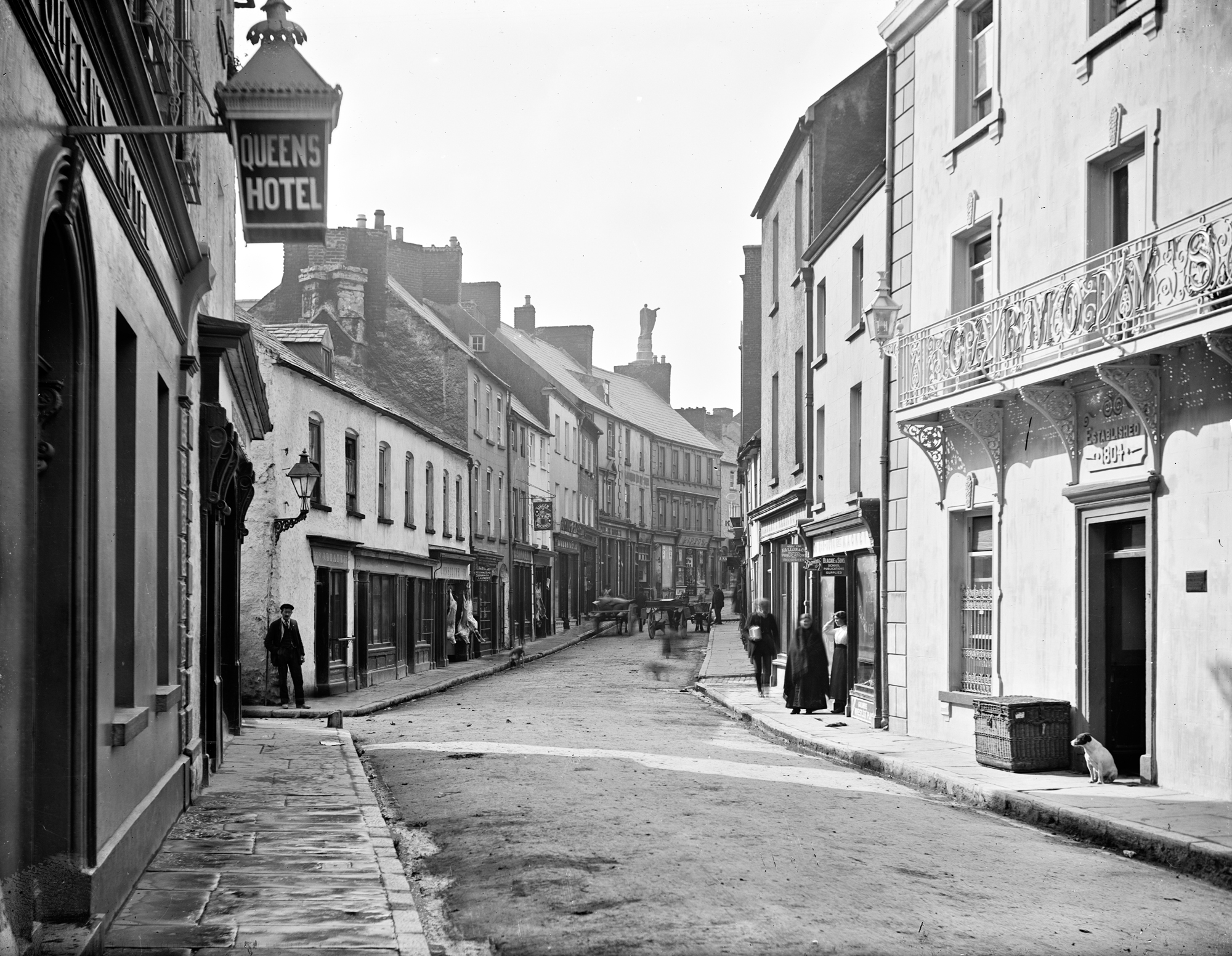
Abbey Street (circa 1910)

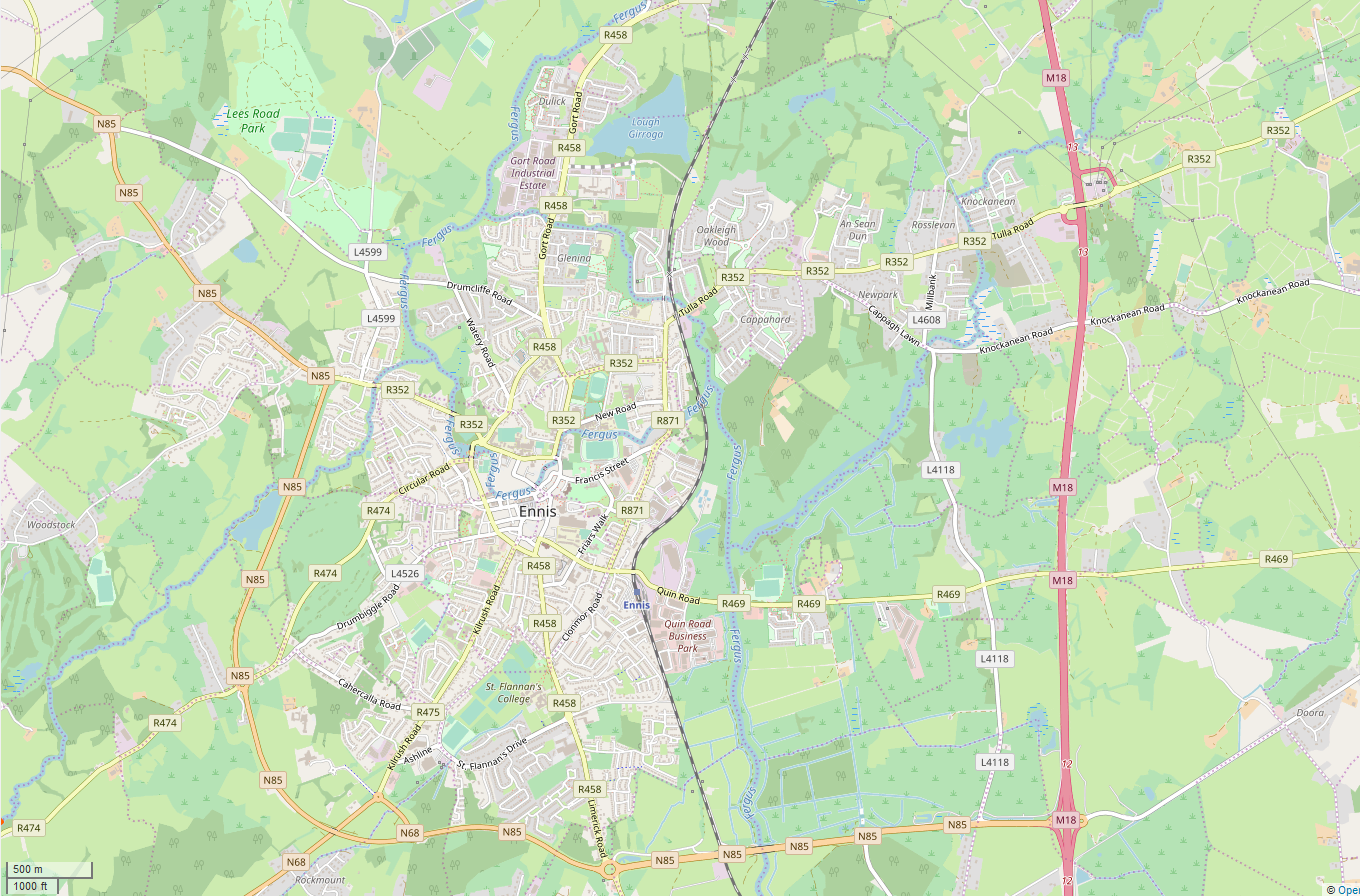
Map of Ennis

The name Ennis derives from the Irish word "Inis", meaning "island". This name relates to an island called Inis Laoi ("Calf Island") or Inis Cluana Rámhfhada ("island of the long rowing meadow") formed between two courses of the River Fergus. The history of Ennis is closely linked with the O'Brien dynasty, descendants of Brian Boru. In the 12th century, the O'Briens, the Kings of Thomond, left their seat of power in Limerick and built a Clonroad Fort in 1210, a royal residence on the banks of the Fergus. In 1240, following the arrival of Franciscan monks, King Donnchadh O'Brien ordered the construction of an extensive church which he later donated to the Friars. The Friary quickly expanded becoming a centre for theological studies, and by 1375 had 600 students and 350 Friars in residence. As the Friary expanded, so too did the surrounding area, with the town becoming a religious centre until the Dissolution of the Monasteries. Despite its official closure in 1540, the Friary continued to operate in a limited way until 1690, remaining the last school of Catholic Theology to survive the Reformation.

When Clare became a county under the rule of Elizabeth I in 1586, Ennis was chosen as its administrative centre and capital because of its central location and its association with the Earls of Thomond. Ennis received a grant to hold fairs and markets in 1610 and later a Charter for a Corporation with a Provost, Free Burgesses, Commonalty and a Town Clerk.

In the colonial period, a number of landmark structures were constructed, including the Mill and Courthouse. The town contains a number of old military barracks, most notably the Old Military Barracks on the Kilrush road. Many locals served in the British Army in the First World War. The Clare Road and Clonroad areas contain terraced cottages built in the early 20th century to house soldiers. On Station Road, then called Jail Road, a gaol once stood.

As its formation was monastic and not defensive, Ennis never had town walls and instead grew as place of commerce and trade. Over the centuries the market town slowly expanded, and eventually developed as a small manufacturing and distribution centre with commodities moved by river to the port at Clarecastle for shipping abroad. Local industries included textile and clothing manufacturing, the milling of corn and flour, as well as brewing of beer and distillation of whiskey with evidence of these industries still present in the town. The 1845 Famine and its aftermath had a substantial effect on the town with the population declining by over 20% because of famine, disease and emigration.

Ennis was governed by a corporation from the early 17th century. It was a parliamentary borough to the Irish House of Commons until 1801, and was given continued representation at Westminster from 1801 to 1885. The borough corporation was dissolved by the Municipal Corporations (Ireland) Act 1840. It was later granted town commissioners under the Towns Improvement (Ireland) Act 1854, which was converted to an urban district under the Local Government (Ireland) Act 1898, and a town council under the Local Government Act 2001. The Local Government Reform Act 2014 dissolved the town council with the creation of Ennis Municipal District under the authority of Clare County Council. Ennis Town Hall is now used as a banqueting suite for the Old Ground Hotel.

Politically, Ennis was long a Fianna Fáil stronghold. However, in the 2009 local elections, the party was reduced to just one member out of nine on Ennis Town Council. A monument to Éamon de Valera, founder of the party and former President of Ireland, stands outside Ennis Courthouse.

The River Fergus runs through the middle of Ennis and is a well-known trout and salmon fishery. At one time, small sailing boats made their way up river from the Shannon and berthed in the centre of the town at Woodquay. This area of the town along with Parnell Street and Mill Road was routinely susceptible to flooding, but the flood defence system put an end to the event in Parnell Street and the Mill Road areas, although in November 2009 other parts of the town experienced severe flooding. A new pedestrian bridge, Harmony Row Bridge, was built over the river Fergus in June 2009.

== Heritage and economy ==
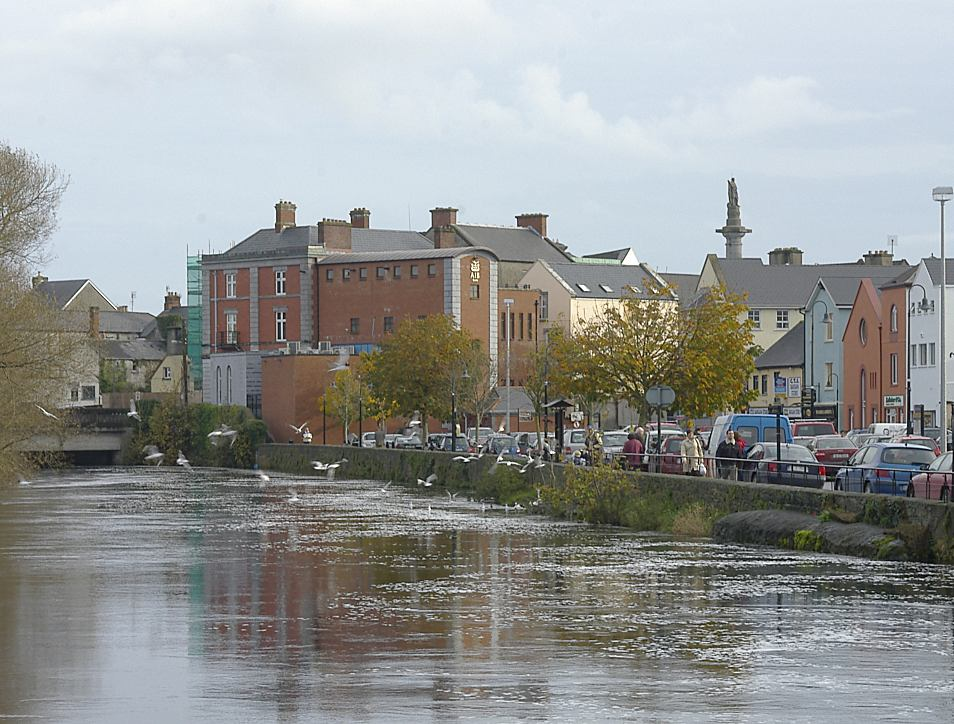
River Fergus in Ennis

Ennis continued to expand in the following centuries, mainly as a market town and later as a manufacturing and distributing centre. Many commodities were conveyed by river to Clarecastle for shipment abroad.

Ennis is a historically important market town. The market square is still home to market stalls on each Saturday throughout the year, although with the rise in the town's commercial retail sector it has shifted from agricultural produce to mainly textiles and home hardware. The market also has an organic farming element.

The town centre consists of medieval narrow streets and laneways, overshadowed by structures built over the last thousand years. Of the main thoroughfares, Parnell Street has been pedestrianised, while the others, O'Connell Street, Bindon Street and Abbey Street, are one way. The Cathedral of Saint Peter and Saint Paul is on the fringe of the old town centre.

Ennis serves as a major regional hub for County Clare. Among its emergency services, it contains the Ennis Hospital, the HQ of the Clare Divisional Garda, the Clare Fire Brigade and Civil Defence. Ennis also includes many relief organisations, such as The Samaritans, Clare Care and St. Vincent De Paul. Among its civil services, it contains Clare County Council, as well as Social and Family affairs.

Ennis has been a centre for Irish Traditional Music, and since 1974 has hosted the Fleadh Nua in late May each year, the second-largest traditional music festival in Ireland. There are other traditional festivals held in the town as well such as the Ennis Trad Festival held annually in November.

== Transport ==
Situated 14 km from Shannon Airport, Ennis is served by both bus and rail links to all major cities and towns in Ireland. The main bus depot is adjacent to the town's train station and both are about one kilometre from the town centre. Ennis railway station is on the Clon Road toward the east of the town, which links to the main N18 in either direction.

Bus services are provided to Shannon Airport, Galway, Limerick, Cork, Dublin and run nearly every hour. Shannon Airport is 15 minutes from Ennis, providing daily flights to European and US destinations.

The M18 motorway was extended from Ennis to Limerick in 2007. The section from Ennis to Gort was opened in 2010.

Ennis was formerly the starting point of the West Clare Railway, a narrow-gauge railway which ran from Ennis to Ennistymon, Milltown Malbay and onwards to the towns and villages along the West Clare coastline. Trains ran from the same railway station which is still used by mainline Irish railway services. The line was CIÉ's last narrow-gauge railway and finally closed in 1961, despite investment in new diesel trains in the early/mid-1950s.

Ennis railway station connects with Galway and with Limerick where onward trains run to Dublin, Cork via Limerick Junction (for connections to Tipperary, Cahir, Clonmel, Carrick-on-Suir and Waterford) and Mallow (for connections to Killarney and Tralee).

== Education ==
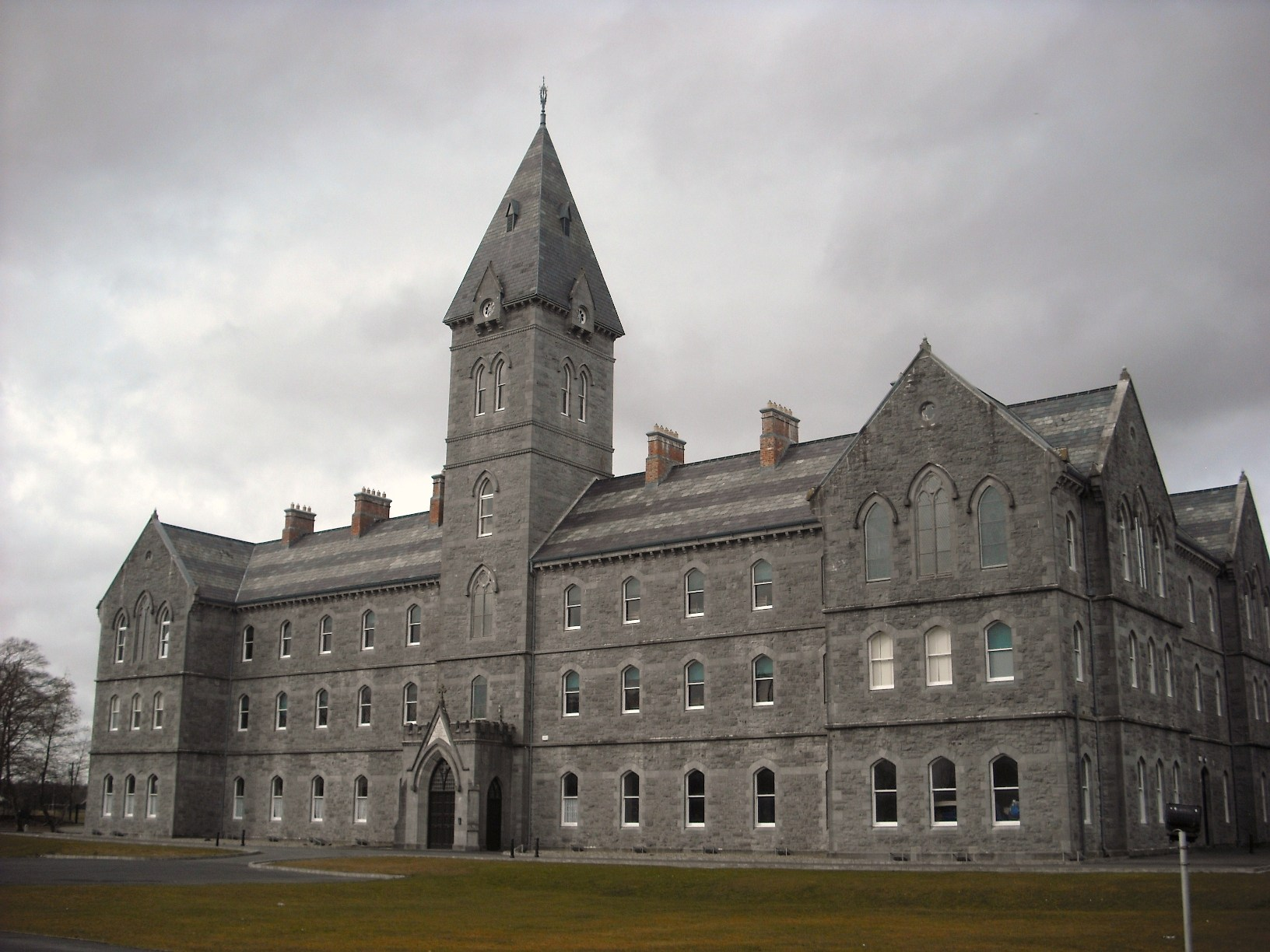
St Flannan's College, one of the oldest school buildings in Ireland

Primary Schools in Ennis include Ennis National School, established in 1897 (formerly Boys National School), Cloughleigh National School, Gaelscoil Mhichíl Cíosóg, Holy Family School, Scoil Chroist Rí, CBS and the multi-denominational Ennis Educate Together National School which opened in 1998. There are several secondary level schools in Ennis, including Rice College, Ennis Community College, Coláiste Muire, St. Flannan's College, and Gaelcholaiste an Chláir. Mid-West Management Training is a FETAC approved provider of further education and training up to Level 6 of the National Framework of Qualifications. Limerick IT opened its Ennis campus in 2019. Limerick IT merged with Athlone IT to become Technological University of the Shannon: Midlands Midwest, in October 2021.

== Climate ==
Ennis has an oceanic climate (Köppen: Cfb).

Climate data for Ennis
Month	Jan	Feb	Mar	Apr	May	Jun	Jul	Aug	Sep	Oct	Nov	Dec	Year
Mean daily maximum °C (°F)	8.3 (46.9)	8.9 (48.0)	10.3 (50.5)	12.6 (54.7)	15.1 (59.2)	17.4 (63.3)	18.3 (64.9)	18.1 (64.6)	16.7 (62.1)	13.7 (56.7)	10.5 (50.9)	8.7 (47.7)	13.2 (55.8)
Daily mean °C (°F)	6.0 (42.8)	6.2 (43.2)	7.0 (44.6)	9.0 (48.2)	11.6 (52.9)	14.0 (57.2)	15.2 (59.4)	15.0 (59.0)	13.6 (56.5)	10.9 (51.6)	8.1 (46.6)	6.5 (43.7)	10.3 (50.5)
Mean daily minimum °C (°F)	3.6 (38.5)	3.6 (38.5)	3.9 (39.0)	5.4 (41.7)	8.0 (46.4)	10.5 (50.9)	12.1 (53.8)	12.0 (53.6)	10.6 (51.1)	8.2 (46.8)	5.6 (42.1)	4.2 (39.6)	7.3 (45.2)
Average precipitation mm (inches)	92.6 (3.65)	82.3 (3.24)	78.8 (3.10)	67.0 (2.64)	83.2 (3.28)	78.5 (3.09)	86.9 (3.42)	94.3 (3.71)	82.5 (3.25)	101.8 (4.01)	105.3 (4.15)	104.6 (4.12)	1,057.8 (41.66)
Source: Weather.Directory

== Culture ==
Ennis is a stronghold of traditional music with many musicians in residence and regularly playing locally. The Ennis Book Club Festival, in association with Clare County Library, runs annually on the first weekend in March. It attracts readers and authors from all over Ireland and beyond. Glór Theatre is a concert and events venue in the town centre.

In 2016 and 2017 Ennis hosted the Fleadh Cheoil na hÉireann music competition. It is the first time that the town has hosted the event since 1977.

== Sports and leisure ==
Cusack Park on Francis Street in the town centre is the main county Gaelic Athletic Association (GAA) playing grounds and the home of Clare GAA. Ennis has numerous football clubs (soccer, GAA and rugby) that play in various leagues from schoolboys to senior.

The Lees Road Sports and Amenity Park, 1 km from the town centre, is set in 134 acres (54 ha) of wood and parkland. Among the facilities available are four conventional playing pitches, full size all-weather floodlit playing pitch, a floodlit 400 m (1,300 ft) synthetic running track and a purpose-built cross country running track. There is a children's playground and skateboard park and marked walks and trails throughout the woodland area. Ennis Leisure Centre has a fully equipped gym with a 25m pool, saunas etc. There are a number of hotels around Ennis that have their own leisure facilities including gyms and 15m to 20m pools.

Within the town, there are six adult soccer clubs (Avenue United, Lifford FC, Ennis Town, Turnpike Rovers, Hermitage FC and Ennis Dons FC), two adult GAA clubs (Éire Óg and The Banner GAA), and one rugby club (Ennis RFC).

Historical population
Year	Pop.	±%
1821	6,701	—
1831	7,711	+15.1%
1841	9,318	+20.8%
1851	7,843	−15.8%
1861	7,041	−10.2%
1871	6,503	−7.6%
1881	6,307	−3.0%
1891	5,460	−13.4%
1901	5,093	−6.7%
1911	5,472	+7.4%
1926	5,518	+0.8%
1936	5,897	+6.9%
1946	5,871	−0.4%
1951	6,097	+3.8%
1956	8,292	+36.0%
1961	8,410	+1.4%
1966	9,181	+9.2%
1971	10,840	+18.1%
1981	14,640	+35.1%
1986	15,547	+6.2%
1991	16,058	+3.3%
1996	17,726	+10.4%
2002	22,051	+24.4%
2006	24,553	+11.3%
2011	25,360	+3.3%
2016	25,276	−0.3%
2022	27,923	+10.5%

== International relations ==
Ennis is twinned with Phoenix, Arizona. Each summer an average of four 4th/5th year students partake in the Phoenix Youth Ambassador Program, which is facilitated by the city of Phoenix twinning committee and the Ennis Chamber of Commerce.

It is also twinned with the town of Saint-Paul-de-Fenouillet in southern France and Langenfeld, Rhineland in Germany.

== Information Age Town ==
In September 1997, Ennis became Ireland's first and only Information Age Town. The town was greatly enhanced by the project's IR£15 million investment, which saw 4,200 computers provided to residents. A computer lab was provided for every school and every primary school classroom was provided with a computer. Elderly residents were given the chance to become computer users also as a result. The project also gave Ennis Ireland's first high-speed ISDN line infrastructure, which connected all the town's businesses together. Ennis was also used as a test site for VISA Cash, which allowed users to top up a Chip and PIN card with petty cash and purchase goods in local stores. Funding for the project ran out in 2000.

== Tidy Town ==
In 2012, 2013 and 2021, Ennis won the Irish Tidy Towns Competition in the Large Urban Centre category.

== Gallery ==
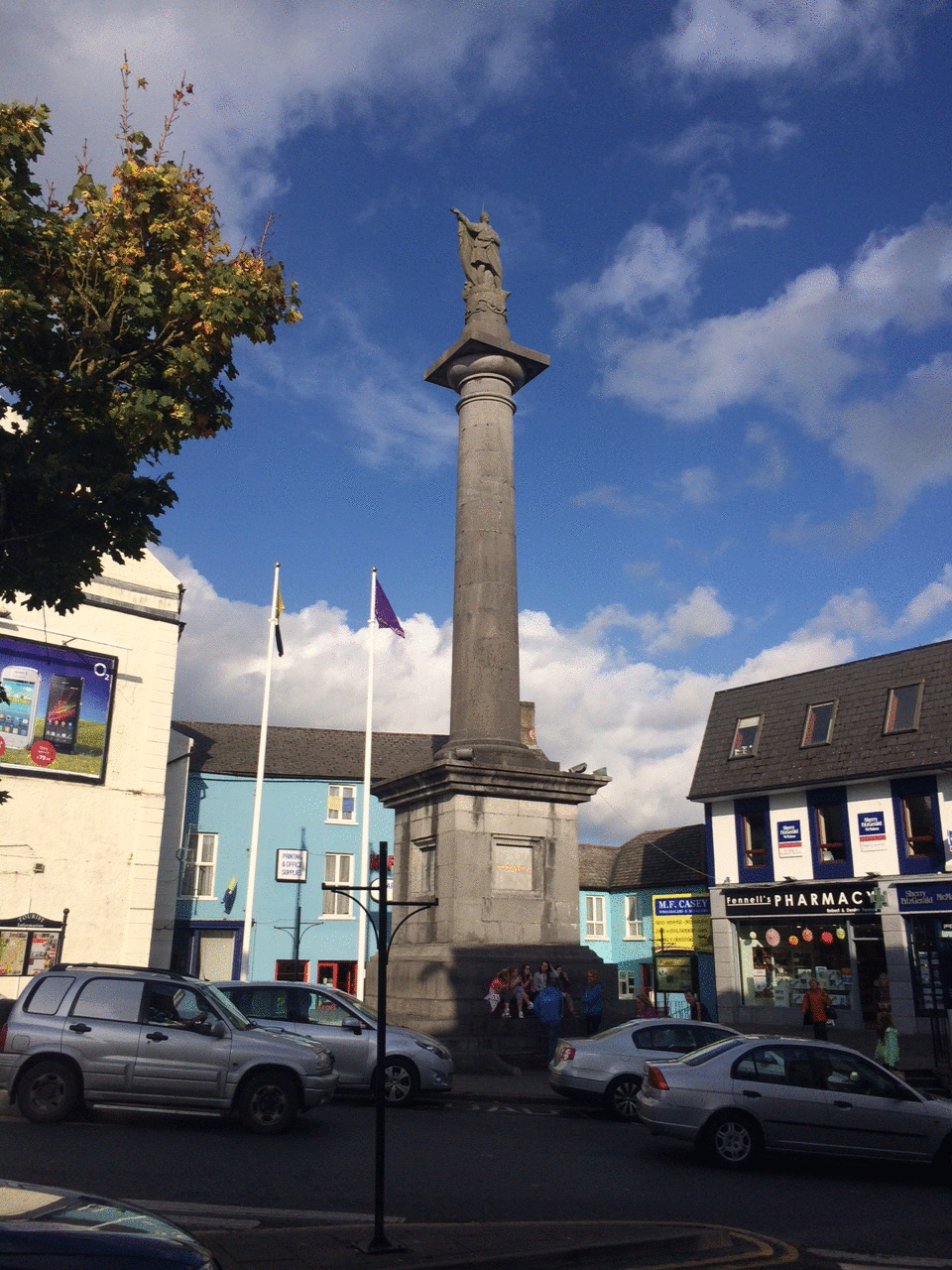
Monument to Daniel O'Connell in O'Connell Square, the site of the old courthouse where he won the 1828 County Clare by-election.

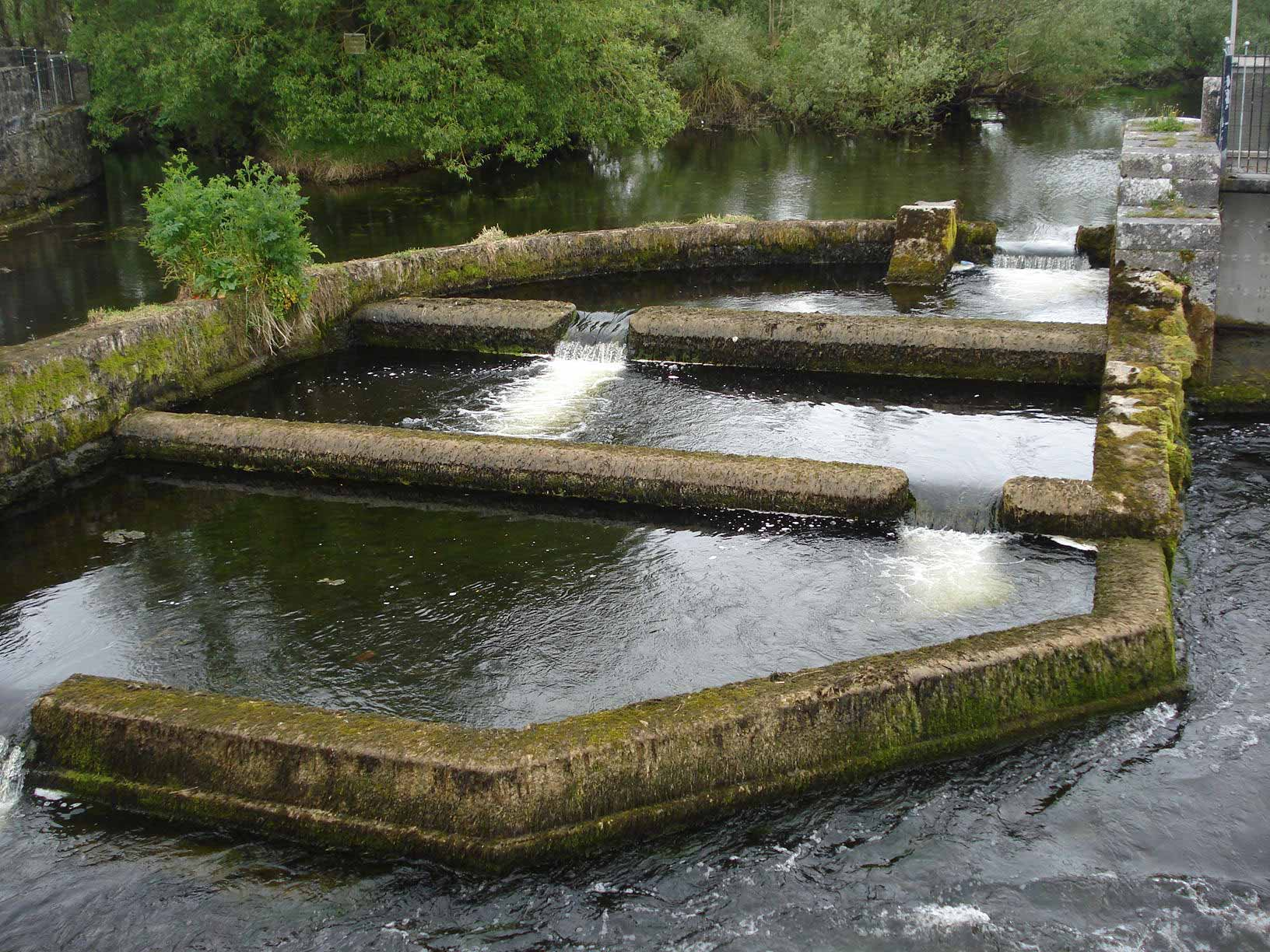
Fish ladder on the River Fergus which flows through Ennis.

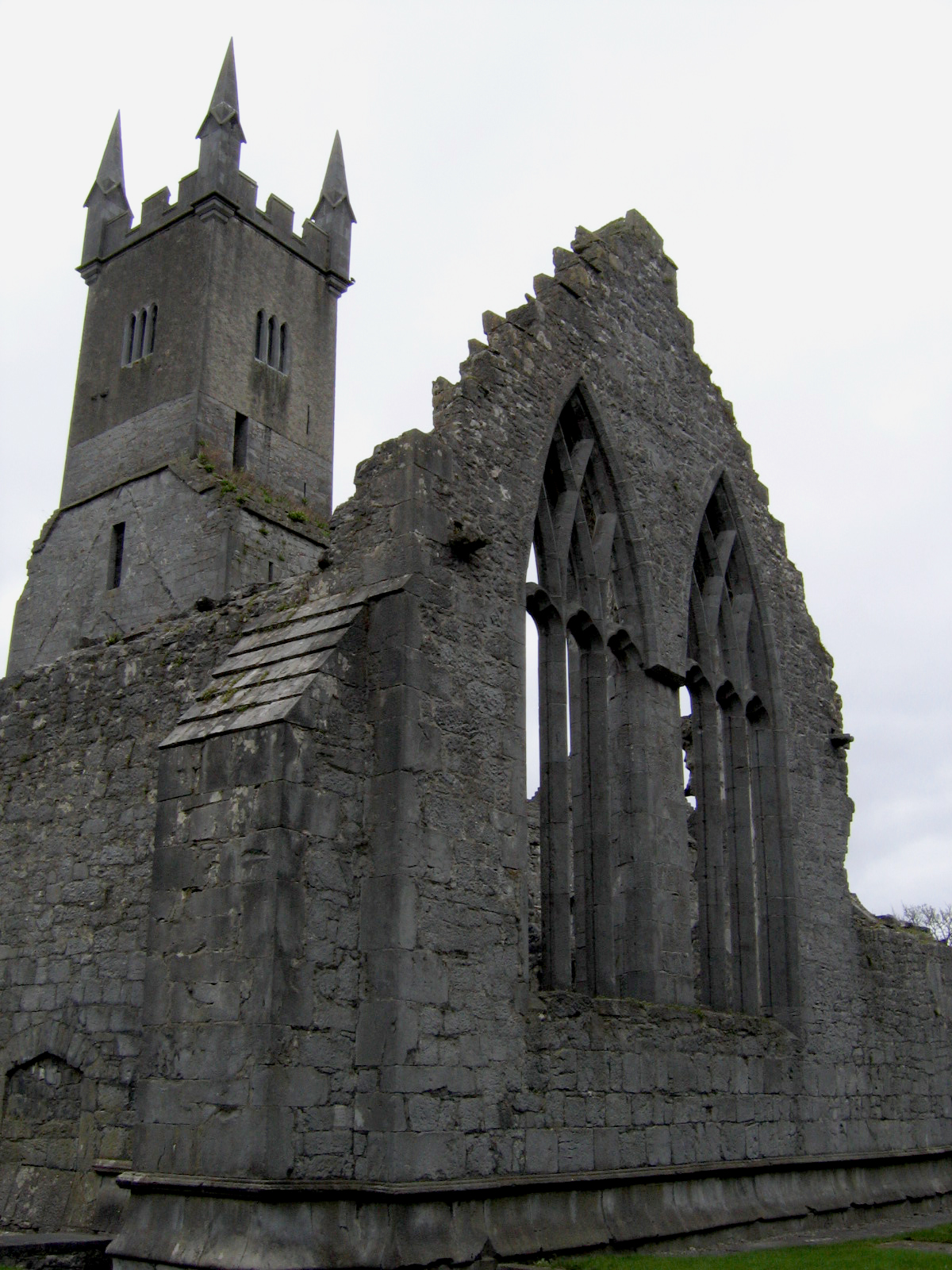
Ennis Friary

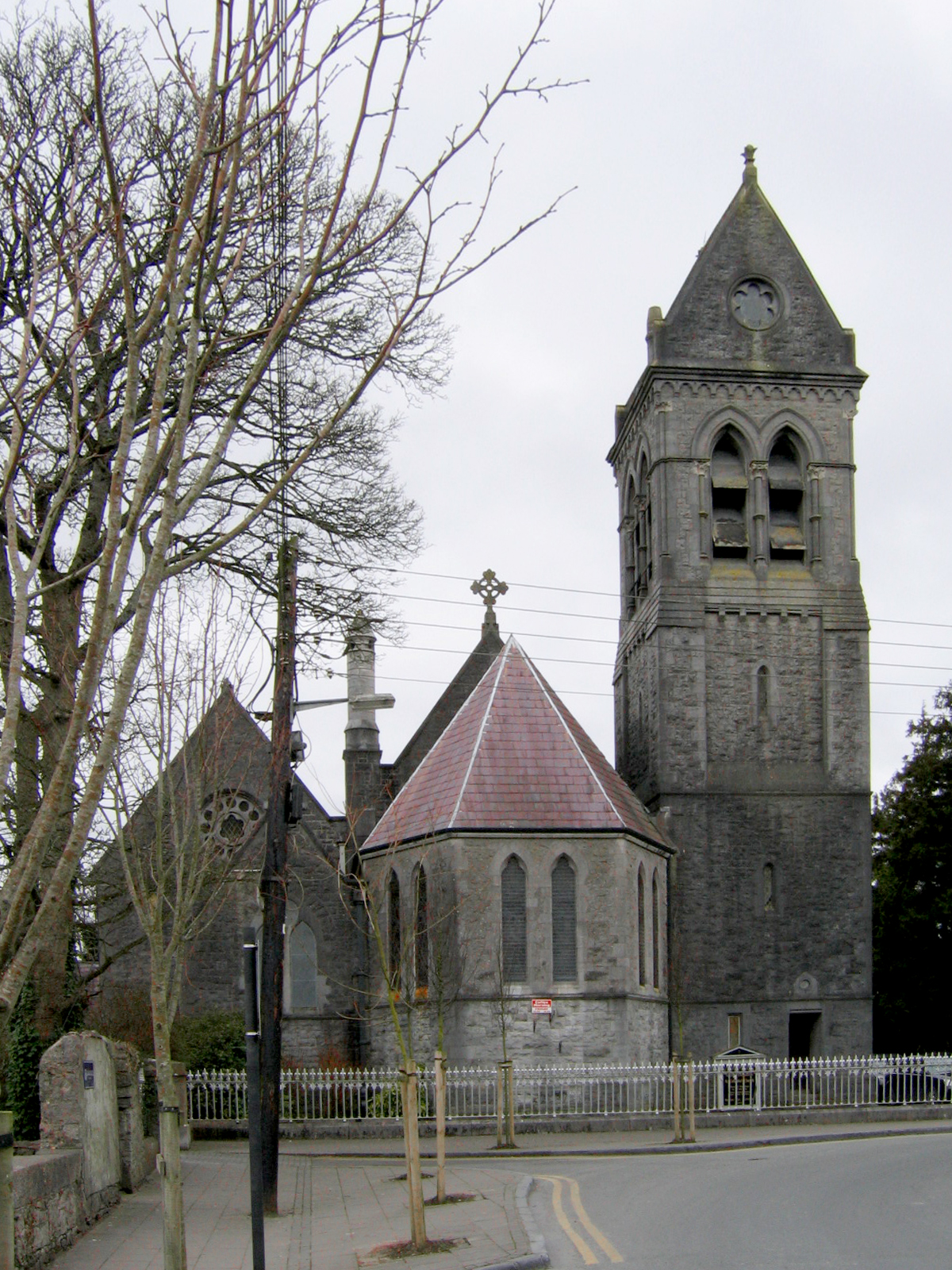
St Columba's Church, Ennis

== Notable people ==
- James Bartholomew Blackwell, French Revolutionary soldier
- Tony MacMahon, Irish button accordion player and radio and television broadcaster.
- John Cunneen, American lawyer and politician
- Thomas Dermody, 18th-century poet
- Michael Enright, Democratic Left politician
- Kieran Hanrahan, radio host and tenor banjo player who won the All-Ireland banjo championship at age 14
- Maeve Kelly, novelist
- Michael Houlihan, former President of the Law Society of Ireland
- Des Lynam, Irish presenter on British television
- Sean Matgamna, Trotskyist theorist
- William Mulready, 19th-century genre painter
- Máiréad Ní Ghráda, Irish playwright and poet
- Matthew O'Brien, 19th-century mathematician
- Daniel O'Connell, MP returned for the Clare electoral area, was known as "The Liberator" for his winning of Catholic emancipation in 1829
- Maura O'Connell, singer
- Mick O'Dea, artist
- Simone Kirby, actress
- Denise Gough, actress and two-time Olivier award recipient (2016 and 2018)
- Kelly Gough, actress
- Mark O'Halloran, screenwriter
- Dara O'Kearney, international ultramarathon runner and professional poker player
- Tommy Cullinan, Grand National-winning jockey
- the Hon. Mr Justice Daniel O'Keeffe, former Judge of the High Court, currently Chairperson of the Standards in Public Office Commission
- Susan O'Neill singer-songwriter
- Marcus Paterson, eminent eighteenth-century lawyer and politician who became Chief Justice of the Irish Common Pleas
- Johnny Patterson, (1840–1889) singer and composer (born in Feakle but raised in Ennis)
- Harriet Smithson, actress and first wife of French composer Hector Berlioz
- Patrick Walshe (born 1952), painter
- Stephen Woulfe, Liberal politician who became Solicitor-General for Ireland in 1836 and as Attorney-General for Ireland in 1838; he became first Catholic to be Chief Baron of the Irish Exchequer
- Thomas Flanagan, finder of the first gold in the immensely rich goldfield of Kalgoorlie, Western Australia in 1893.
- Matthias Finucane, judge of the Court of Common Pleas (Ireland)

== In popular culture ==
- Ennis is referred to in James Joyce's Ulysses
- Ennis is mentioned in the songs "Isobel" by British performer Dido, and "At The Ceili" by Celtic Woman

== Townlands and civil parishes ==
The town of Ennis is situated in parts of the civil parishes of Doora, Drumcliff, Kilraghtis and Templemaley. Townlands are:

- Doora: Ballaghboy, Bunnow, Gaurus, and Knockanean
- Drumcliff: Cahircalla Beg, Cahircalla More, Claureen, Cloghleagh, Clonroad Beg, Clonroad More, Drumbiggil, Drumcliff, Lifford, Loughvella, and Shanvogh
- Kilraghtis: Rosslevan
- Templemaley: Ballycorey, Cappahard, Dulick, Knockaderry, and Knockanoura

== See also ==
- List of abbeys and priories in Ireland (County Clare)
- List of towns and villages in Ireland
- Roslevan, Ennis
