= Patrick Walshe =

Irish painter (born 1952)

Patrick John Walshe (born November 1952) is an Irish painter.

== Life ==
Walshe was born in Ennis in the West of Ireland, Walshe was educated at the Benedictine Abbey of Glenstal from 1964 to 1970. He then attended Trinity College, Dublin, 1970-74 where he studied for an Honours degree in business. He was president of the Art Soc from 1971 to 1974. He had his first exhibition at the Tom Caldwell Gallery on Baggot Street, Dublin with fellow artist Tim Booth, late of Dr. Strangely Strange in 1976. In 1982 he moved to New York and lived in a loft in Brooklyn and while working as a chef at the Water Club he was part of the East Village art scene of the time, exhibiting at the Beuhlahland Gallery, on Avenue A, owned by Susan Hannaford-Rose, in 1984. From there Walshe moved to Los Angeles in 1986, again working as a chef to support his painting. He exhibited widely, with Renata Beuhler in North Wells Street in Chicago 91989 and 1990)and numerous Los Angeles galleries (John Thomas, Wilshire Tower Gallery and Fullerton County Museum). In 1992 Walshe left the U.S. and spent two years travelling and painting across Asia and Africa before settling back in Ireland with his family. He now lives and paints in County Wicklow and exhibits regularly in both Britain and Ireland. He is in many collections throughout the world, but because of his early restlessness he remains somewhat of an outsider in the art world.

== Recent work ==
Since 2004, Walshe has developed a technique of painting on canvas overlaid with silver leaf in order to give a three-dimensional quality to his images. He has exhibited these paintings in Russborough House, courtesy of the Sir Alfred Beit Foundation in 2009 and 2010, The Orangery, Holland Park, London 2010 and most importantly in Christ Church Cathedral, Dublin in April 2012. Exhibition at Art Hub, Abu Dhabi, June 2010. www.arthub.ae
