= Single track (mountain biking) =

Narrow mountain biking trail

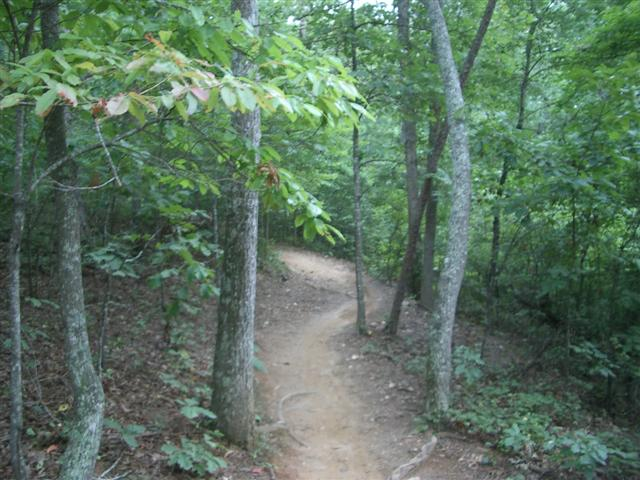
A singletrack trail near Woodstock, Georgia (U.S.).

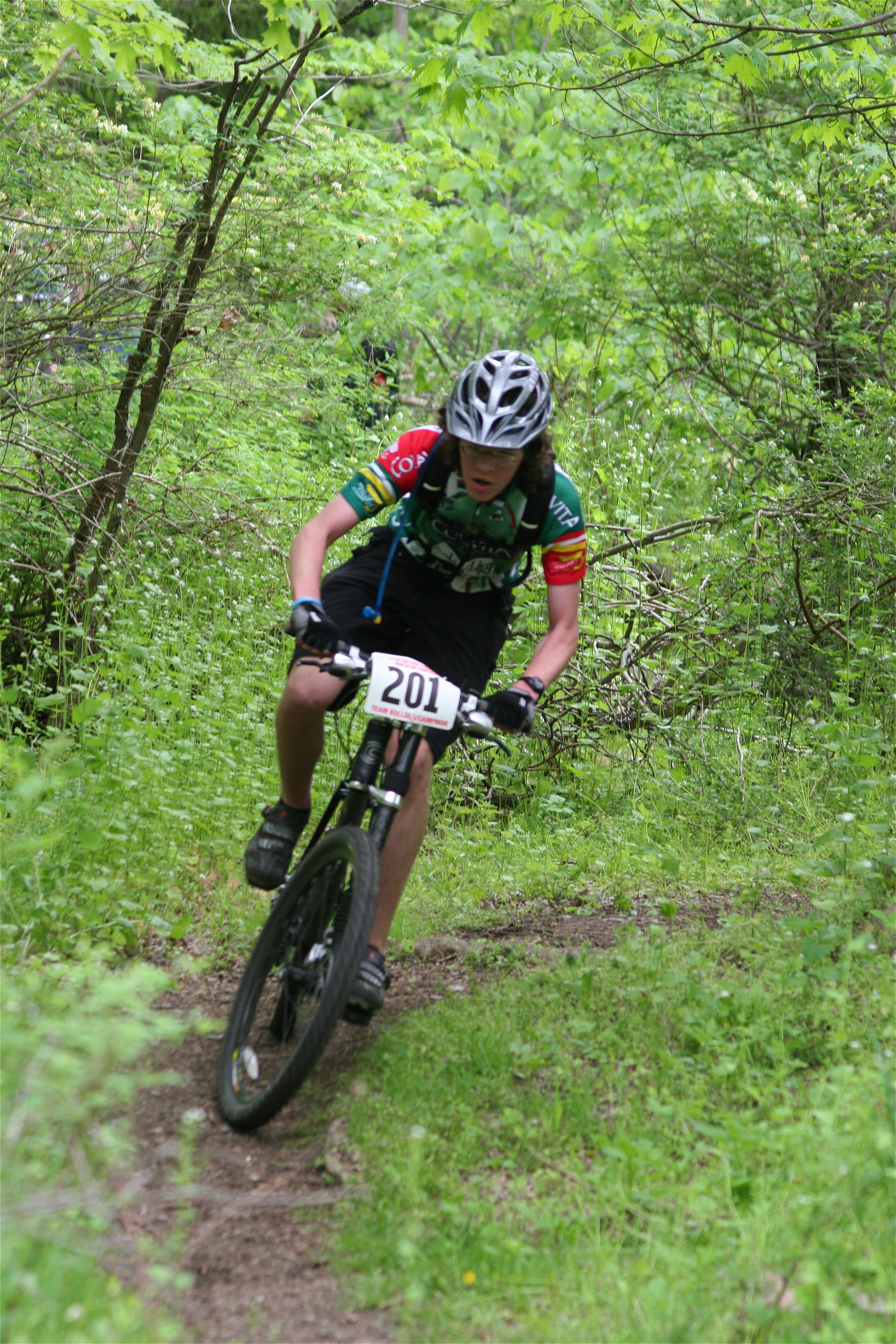
A cross-country rider on singletrack during a race.

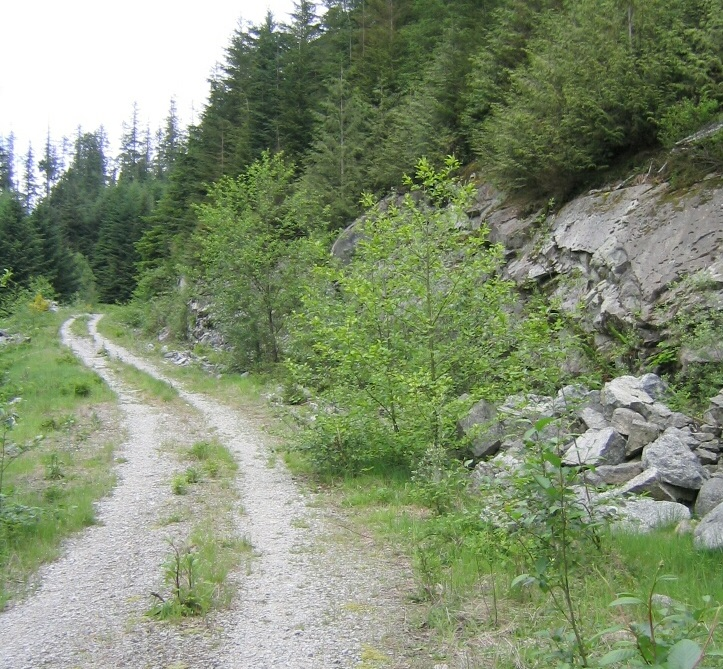
An example of doubletrack.

Singletrack (or single track) is a type of mountain biking trail that is approximately the width of the bike. It contrasts with double-track or fire road which is wide enough for four-wheeled off-road vehicles. It is often smooth and flowing, but may also feature technical rocky sections, go over tree roots, and include berms, banked turns, switch-backs, hills, drops, jumps, and so forth. Singletrack which descends significantly, and in the most downward direction, is said to be following the fall line.

Many mountain bike riders prefer singletrack over other types of trails, as singletrack is usually designed specifically for the sport, and therefore can have elements which highlight features of the sport (whereas other trail types will usually be more straight, and not exhibit as many hills and other special features). Some singletrack includes TTF's (technical trail features) designed to challenge riders, such as log piles, log rides, skinnies, rock gardens, gap jumps, and wall-rides.

Doubletrack (or double track) contrasts with singletrack in that it has two paths, which are approximately parallel. Jeep trails and fire roads are examples of a doubletrack trail.

== Trail building ==
There are often volunteers, both organized and informal, that maintain and create singletrack in many places. Organized volunteers coordinate with park districts or land owners to modify the natural woods or terrain to accommodate singletrack bikers. Some paths are created from scratch, while others are modified hiking paths.

In one report, the USDA highlights several potential problems when it comes to trail building: effects on natural resources, use of designated wilderness, conflict with other users, and notable safety issues. These regulations are devised to make mountain biking sustainable; the IMBA strives to promote mountain biking in a way that trails made are done so according to previously ordained regulations and the idea that if built properly, trail maintenance and environmental impact will be minimal. In one example, Singletrack Advocates (STA) is a nonprofit organization that strives to build and maintain singletrack around Anchorage. Since its beginnings in 2007, STA has prevailed in legislation and construction of over 20 miles of new trails in the Anchorage area (Alaska).

== Trail maintenance ==
In 2000, Clemson University (South Carolina, U.S.) Department of Crop, Soil and Environmental Sciences conducted a study on mountain biking and the sustainability of the sport as it relates to the natural environment. The researchers outlined four capacities that must be met to sustain a trail or trail system: Physical Capacity, the amount of space a given activity demands, Ecological Capacity, how much damage the environment can withstand before detrimental effect, Facility Capacity, what a given population needs in order to enjoy such recreational areas; and Social Capacity, the point at which one decides how many users the trail can accommodate comfortably at any one time. Mountain biking is a sustainable sport in that once a trail or trail system is made, it can be used for many years, but like accommodating for specific carrying capacities, there are many concerns in maintenance and use. Resource managers, typically employed by private or federal agencies, are in position to make judgment on how and when trail maintenance needs to be done. Resource managers take care of outstanding trail conditions such as the following: erosion control, trail widening and or rutting, shortcuts, soil decomposition, damage to drainage structures, damage to flora, fauna and water structures. In order to preserve the sustainability and progress the mountain biking community has seen in the most recent of years, trail maintenance must be continual, from being proactive in legislation, to environmental awareness in physical maintenance.

== "Rules of the Trail" ==
The IMBA has developed a set of rules "to promote responsible and courteous conduct on shared-use trails." Every trail may have a slightly different set of rules. Most commonly, the rules include provisions such as the following:

- Mountain bikers must yield to both hikers and riders on horses (equestrians), unless the trail is clearly designated and marked for bike-only travel. Hikers yield to equestrians.
- Downhill riders yield to uphill riders (unless the trail is clearly marked for one-way or downhill-only traffic).
- "Leave No Trace" - Mountain bikers should ride in a way that does not cause damage or ecological erosion to the trail. Riders should not cut switchbacks. If there is standing water, riders should not ride around it if it causes erosion at the side, or will cause the trail to become wider. Littering is never acceptable.

Other rules are often posted for the considerations of specific individual trails.

== See also ==
- Fall line
- Mountain biking
- Downhill mountain biking
- Enduro (mountain biking)
- Cross-country cycling
- Pump track
- Glossary of cycling
- Singletrack Magazine
- IMBA (International Mountain Bicycling Association)
