= Louis Bowser Cumpston =

- Born: 27 November 1865; Liverpool, England
- Died: 30 November 1931 (aged 66); Subiaco, Western Australia
- Occupation: Architect
- Spouse(s): Daphne Norah Venn (divorced); Aimee Muriel Love
- Children: 4
- Parent: Louis Philippe Cumpston

Louis Bowser Cumpston (1865–1931) was a British architect. He mostly designed buildings in Western Australia.

== Early life ==
Louis Bowser Cumpston was born on 27 November 1865 in Liverpool, England. His father, Louis Philippe Cumpston, was a builder who went bankrupt in 1873 and decided to emigrate to Australia later that year. After being briefly educated on the Isle of Man, Louis, his brother and two sisters joined their father in Echuca, about 200 km away from Melbourne. By 1885, Louis Philippe Cumpston, who had reinvented himself as an accountant, went bankrupt again. Meanwhile, in the 1880s, Louis completed his secondary education and spent two years living in England.

== Career ==
Cumpston returned to Australia, and became articled to architect John Robertson in Melbourne. Shortly after, he worked for James Moore & Sons, a building firm. However, due to the economic downturn in Melbourne at the time, he decided to move to Western Australia, where he became a successful architect.

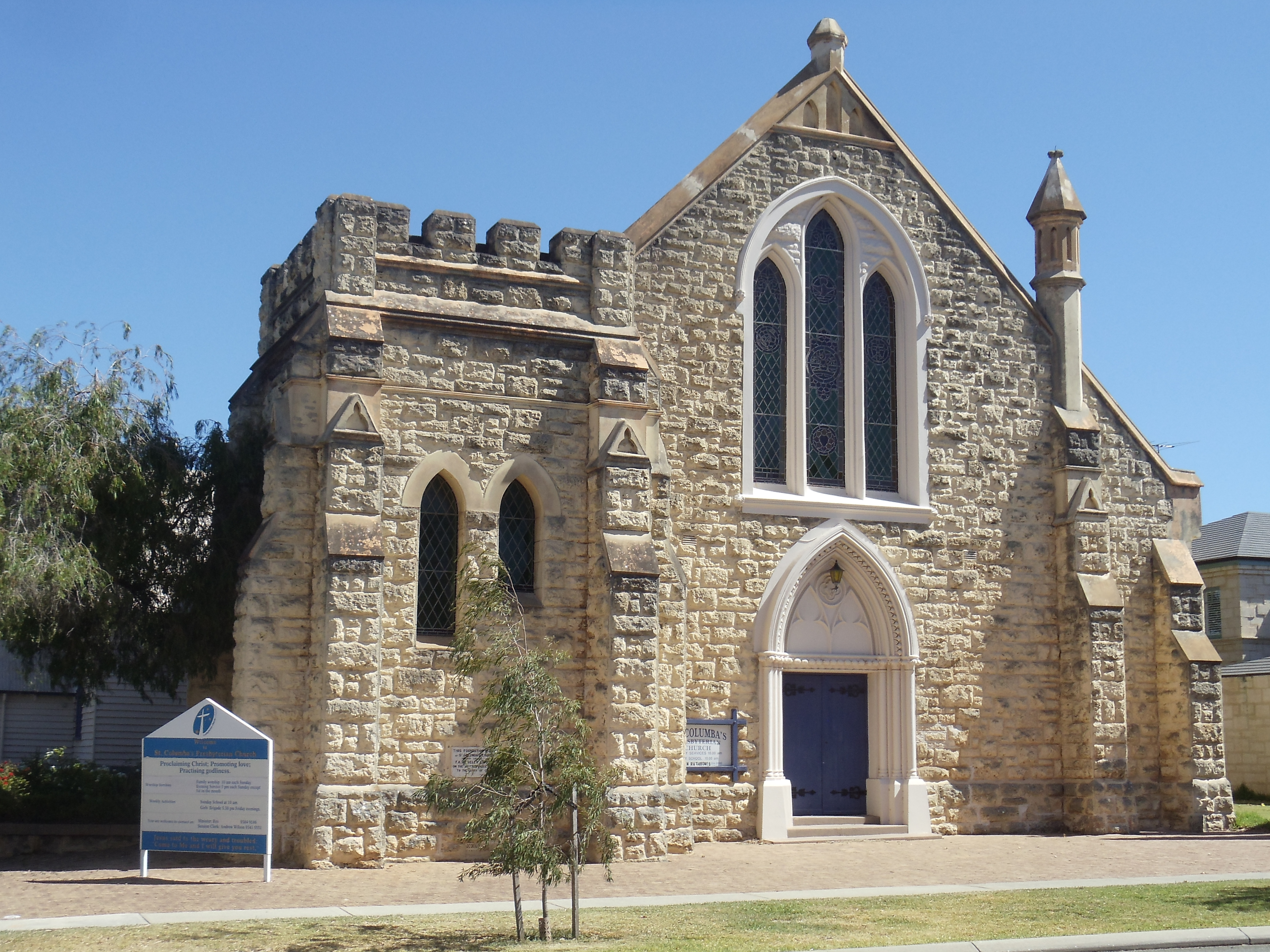
St Columba's Presbyterian Church in Peppermint Grove, Western Australia.

In 1892, he designed a building on the corner of William and Wellington streets in Perth for a prominent businessman at the time named Wesley Maley. He later designed Mitchell's Buildings located at 136-142 on William Street for Mrs Harriet Mitchell. He also designed houses on the corner of Harvest Terrace and Hay Street in 1896 and the Osborne hotel in Claremont in 1901. He also designed the Ocean Beach Hotel in Cottesloe, perhaps his best known hotel. Additionally, he went on to design several other hotels: Exchange Hotel in Greenbushes, the Gosnells Hotel in Gosnells, the Boyup Brook Hotel in Boyup Brook, the Nungarin Hotel in Nungarin, the Parkerville Tavern in Parkerville, the Railway Hotel in Mullewa, the Salmon Gums Hotel in Salmon Gums, and the Cunderdin Hotel in Cunderdin. In 1905, he designed the warehouse on King Street.

In 1909, he designed St Columba's Presbyterian Church in Peppermint Grove, Western Australia. He also designed the Collie Municipal Offices in Collie, Western Australia, the Gosnells Roads Board Offices on Gosnells, and Pinjarra Roads Board Offices in Pinjarra, Western Australia In 1915, he designed a carriage factory on Wellington Street. Additionally, he designed private residences and shops in Cottesloe, Claremont, Perth, North Perth, Mount Lawley, and Victoria Park. He also designed the Tom Burke House located at 191-195 on Newcastle Street in Northbridge; a bungalow located at 30 Park Road in Mount Lawley, and small houses located at 34, 36, 44 & 46 on Edward Street in Perth.

== Personal life and death ==
Cumpsto married Daphne Norah Venn in March 1895. However, he was granted a divorce after it was proven that his wife had been having an affair with her uncle, J.B. Simmons.

In 1901, he married again, to Aimee Muriel Love. They had a son, Graham, and three daughters, Nancy, Miriam and Mary. They resided in a mansion on the corner of View Street and Forrest Street in Peppermint Grove; their house was torn down in 1974. In 1907, they moved from Peppermint Grove to Railway Parade in Leederville. Three years later, in 1910, they moved to 16 Emerald Terrace in West Perth.

Cumpston died on 30 November 1931 in Subiaco, Western Australia.
