= Ennis National School =

Primary school in Ennis, County Clare, Ireland

Coordinates: 52°50′29″N 8°59′15″W

Ennis National School is a primary school in Ennis, County Clare, Ireland opened in 1897. It was a boys' school for 95 years before becoming co-educational in 1992. As of the 2018–2019 school year, it had 38 individuals in its teaching staff.

The school's curriculum includes participating in "Ennis Information Age Schools", leading a poetry project. A team of pupils won the 2003 national Cadbury/NPC Challenge Quiz, out of 1,800 schools.

Development of a replacement school on a new site was finally authorised by the Government in November 2006. This followed a long campaign by parents. The new building opened in 2014.
