= Matthew O'Brien (mathematician) =

Irish mathematician (1814–1855)

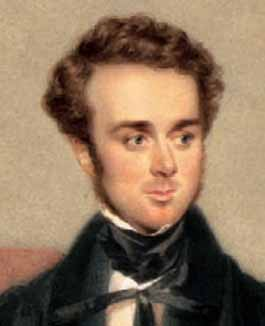
- Born: 1814; Ennis, Ireland
- Died: 22 August 1855 (aged 41); Petit Ménage, Jersey
- Education: Trinity College, Dublin; Caius College, Cambridge
- Scientific career
- Fields: Mathematics
- Workplaces: King's College London

Matthew O'Brien (1814–1855) was an Irish mathematician.

== Life and work ==
O'Brien was born at Ennis (county Clare) son of a medical doctor. In 1830 he was admitted in the Trinity College, Dublin, and in 1834 in the Caius College (university of Cambridge) where he graduated in 1838 as third wrangler, as pupil of William Hopkins. During a brief period (1840–1841) he was fellow of Caius College.

From 1844 to 1854 he was lecturer on Natural Philosophy and Mathematics at King's College London, he simultaneously held the post of lecturer on Astronomy in the Royal Military Academy, Woolwich.

O'Brien was the author of twenty mathematical papers and some elementary textbooks. His most notable contribution was in theory and application of the vector method, in a set of papers published between 1846 and 1852. However, he did not finish fully developing the method because some of his theories were unsatisfactory, and because he failed to include a treatment of associativity. His work was very innovative, but his ideas were almost completely ignored by his contemporaries.

== Bibliography ==
- Craik, Alex D.D. (2008). Mr Hopkins' Men: Cambridge Reform and British Mathematics in the 19th Century. Springer. ISBN 978-1-84800-132-9.
- Crowe, Michael J. (1994). A History of Vector Analysis: The Evolution of the Idea of a Vectorial System. Dover Publications. ISBN 978-0-486-67910-5.
- Lynch, Peter (2014). "Matthew O'Brien: an inventor of vector analysis". Bulletin of the Irish Mathematical Society. 74: 81–88. doi:10.33232/BIMS.0074.81.88. ISSN 0791-5578. S2CID 14244471.
- Smith, G.C. (1982). "Matthew O'Brien's anticipation of vectorial mathematics". Historia Mathematica. 9 (2): 172–190. doi:10.1016/0315-0860(82)90002-7. ISSN 0315-0860.
