= St Columba's United Reformed Church, York =

Church in York, England

St Columba's United Reformed Church
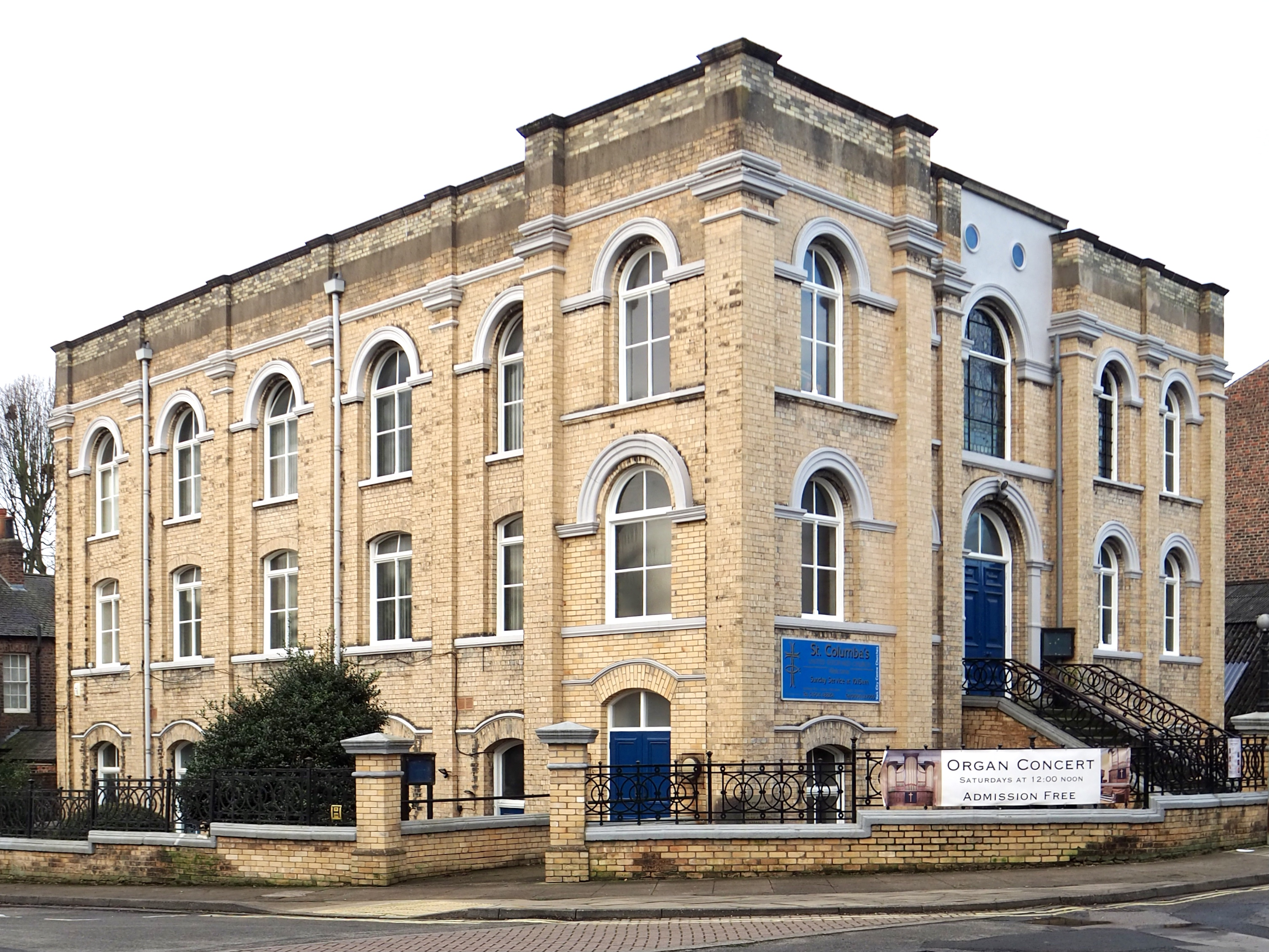
- The church, in 2020
- St Columba's United Reformed Church
- 53.955445°N 1.088312°W
- OS grid reference: SE 59918 51422
- Location: York, North Yorkshire
- Address: Priory Street, York
- Country: England
- Denomination: United Reformed Church
- Website: www.stcolumbaswithnewlendal.yolasite.com

History
- Status: Active
- Dedication: Columba
- Consecrated: 1879

Architecture
- Architect: Thomas Brownlow Thompson
- Style: Italianate
- Construction cost: £5,000

Specifications
- Materials: Brick

Administration
- District: Yorkshire Synod

St Columba's United Reformed Church is a historic chapel on Priory Street, in the city centre of York, in England.

In 1873, the minister of the Prospect Street Presbyterian Church in Hull began preaching at the Lecture Hall on Goodramgate in York. In September, 54 local residents signed a petition for the Presbyterian Church of England to recognise the preaching station, which was granted. The congregation grew, in part due to Scottish railway workers and Scottish regiments stationed at the Imphal Barracks. They purchased a site on Priory Street, and Thomas Brownlow Thompson designed a church, which was opened on 6 November 1879. Its construction cost £5,000, and in addition to the main hall, it included a classroom and vestry. An organ was installed in 1907, while in 1949 the pediment on the main front and the corner tower were taken down. Nikolaus Pevsner describes the resulting facade as "a weak composition".

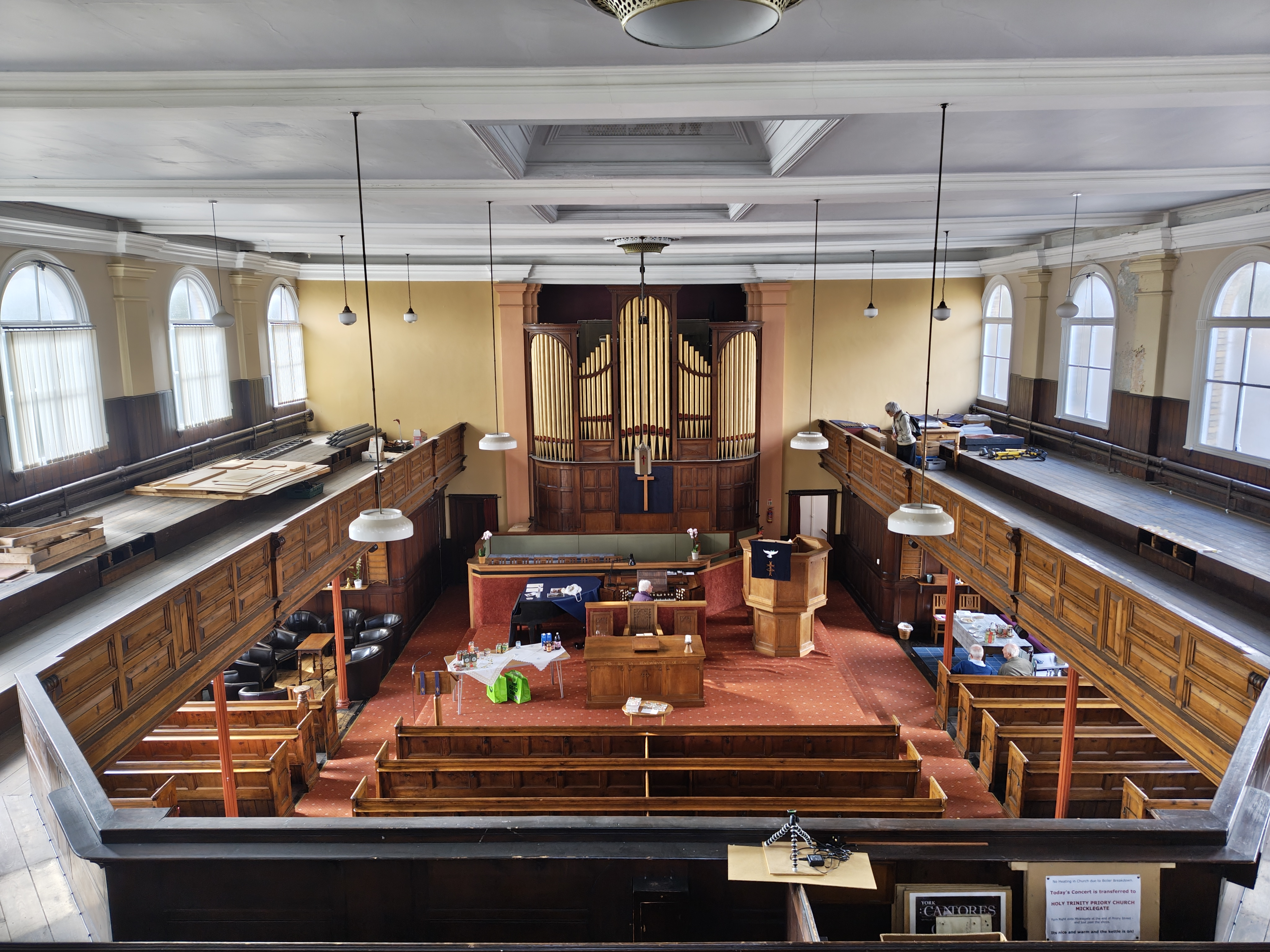
Interior of the church

In 1972, the Presbyterian Church of England merged with the Congregational Church in England and Wales to become the United Reformed Church. York's Congregational Church, on Lendal, closed in 1995, with the congregation joining that of St Columba. The church established a community foundation in 2008, which offers space in the building for charities and community groups to use for offices and meetings. As of 2015, the church had a congregation of around 70 people.

The church is two storeys high and has a front five bays wide. It is built of white brick and is in the Italianate style, with round-arched windows and pilasters reaching the full height of the building. Inside, there is a west gallery, from which most of the seats have been removed, and three stained glass windows, two with the badges of Scottish regiments of the British Army. The church is partly surrounded by original iron railings.
