= St Columba's Presbyterian Church, Peppermint Grove =

St Columba's Presbyterian Church
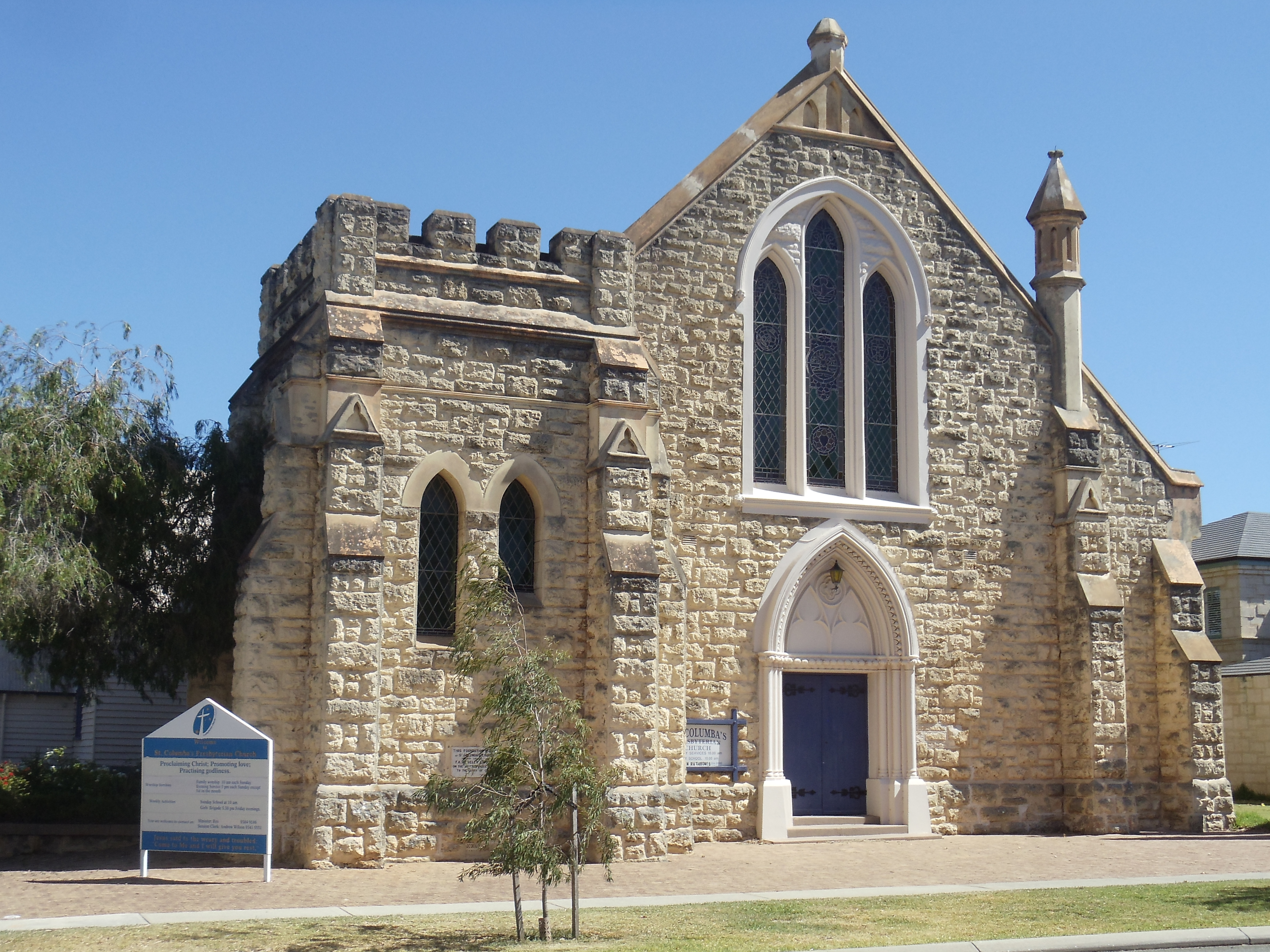
- St Columba's Presbyterian Church, 2014
- St Columba's Presbyterian Church
- 32°00′06″S 115°45′48″E
- Location: Venn and Keane Street, Peppermint Grove, Western Australia
- Country: Australia
- Denomination: Presbyterian

History
- Status: Church
- Founded: 20 November 1909
- Founder: F. A. Moseley
- Dedication: Saint Columba

Architecture
- Functional status: Active
- Architect: Louis Bowser Cumpston
- Architectural type: Church

Administration
- Province: Presbyterian Church in Western Australia

Western Australia Heritage Register
- Type: State Registered Place
- Designated: 28 June 1996
- Reference no.: 1927

St Columba's Presbyterian Church is a Presbyterian church at the corner of Venn and Keane streets in Peppermint Grove, a suburb of Perth, Western Australia.

== History ==
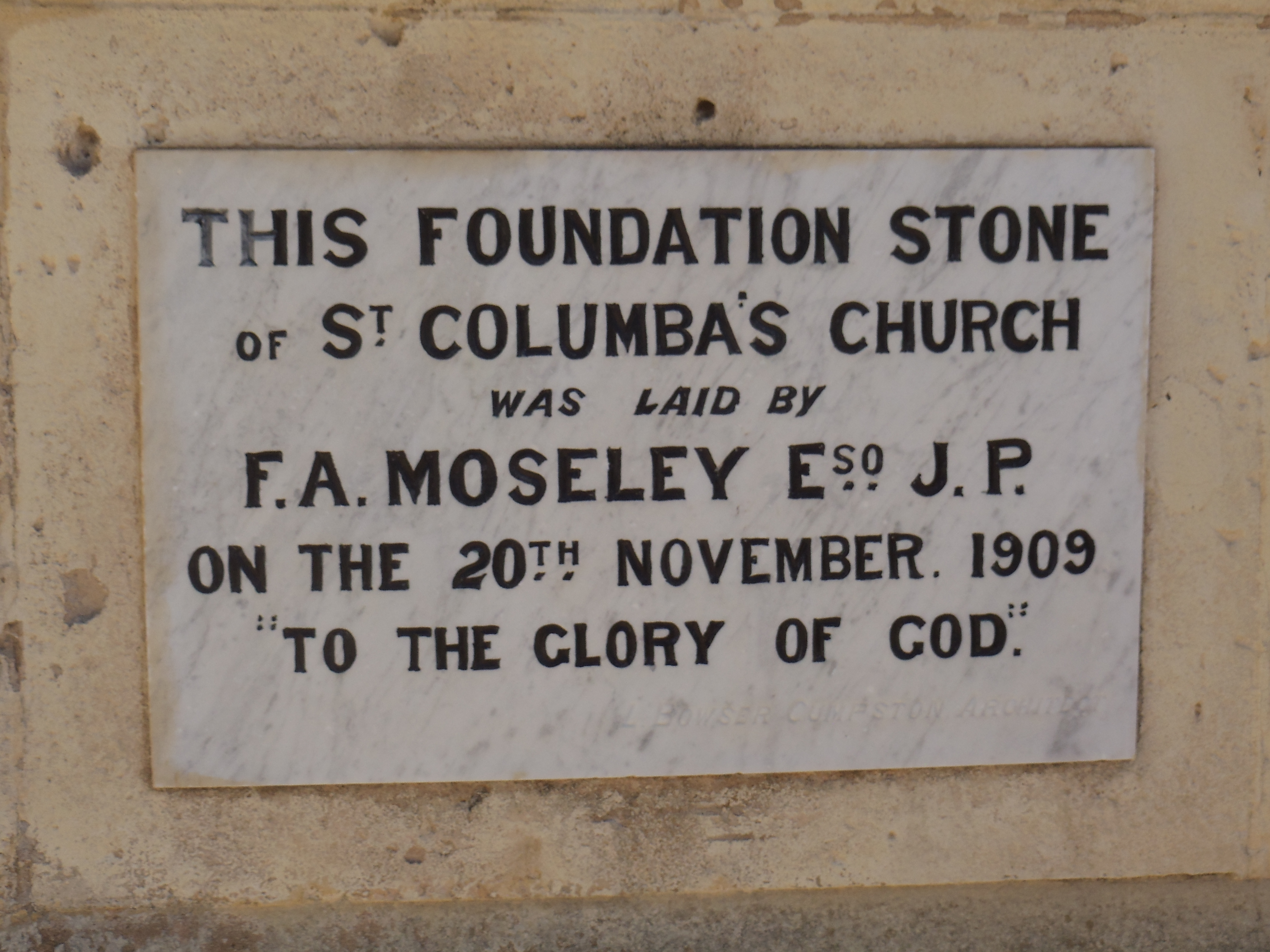
Plaque on the front wall of the church

The suburb of Peppermint Grove was originally predominantly Scottish, and thus Presbyterian. An earlier building, called the St Columba's Presbyterian Church Hall, was built on Venn Street in 1896. It was the first church building in Peppermint Grove and also acted as the only school in the neighbourhood until the construction of the Cottesloe State School.

A few years later, land on the corner of Venn and Keane Streets was donated by Alexander Forrest to build the current church building. It was designed by architect Louis Bowser Cumpston.

Construction began on 20 November 1909, when the first stone was laid by F. A. Moseley.

== Worship services ==
Worship services take place every Sunday at 10 am. The current minister is Kwangho Song.
