= St Columba's Church, Ennis =

Coordinates: 52°50′43.69″N 8°59′9.67″W

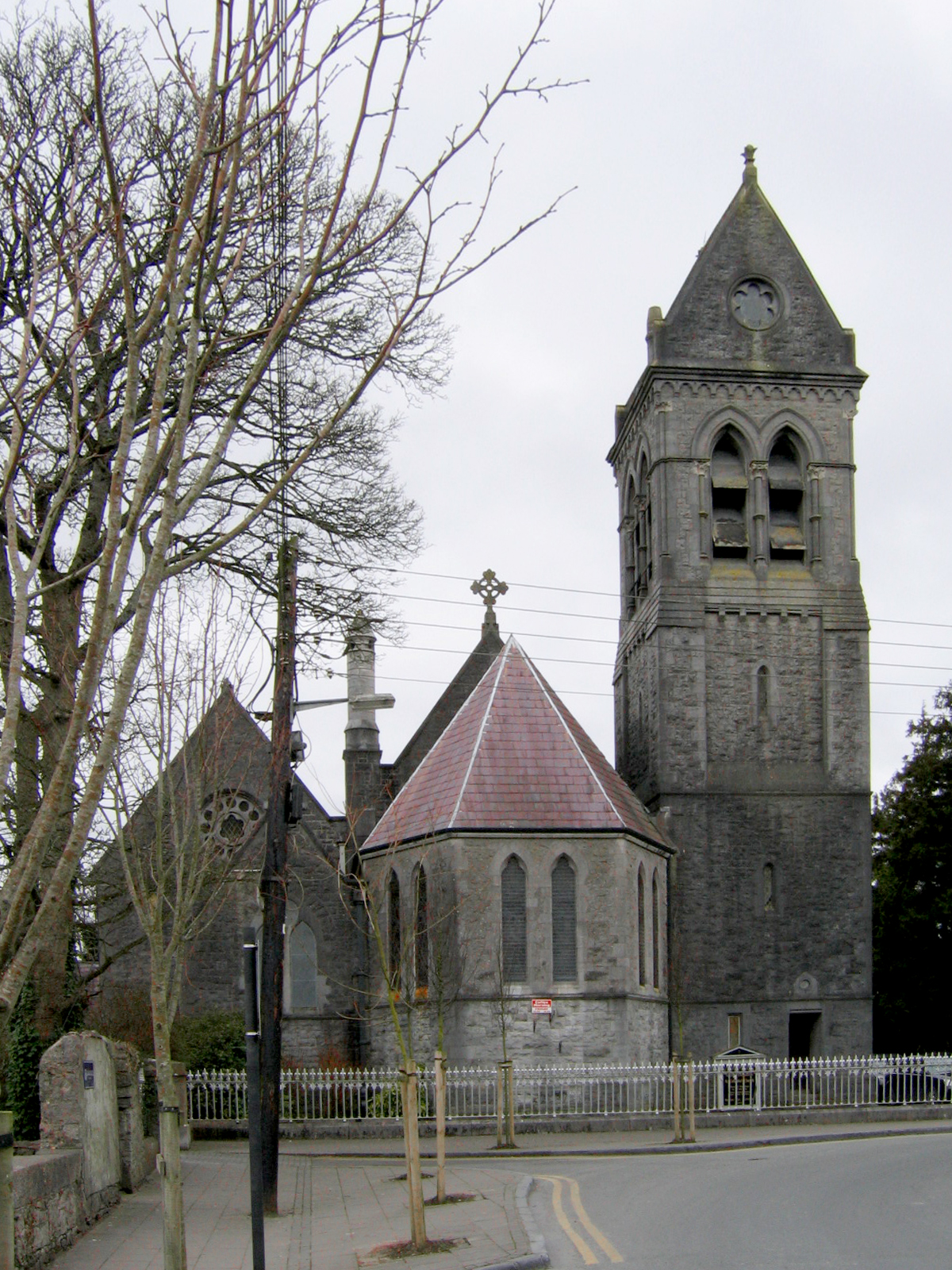
St Columba's Church, Ennis

St Columba's Church is a congregation of the Church of Ireland, part of the Anglican Communion, in Ennis, County Clare, western Ireland.

St. Columba's was built between 1868 and 1871 as the new building for Drumcliffe Parish to the design by architect Francis Bindon. Previous locations for the parish include Ennis Friary which was vacated by the Franciscan Order in the early nineteenth century. The present building was the last Anglican Church to be built in Ireland before its disestablishment by the Irish Church Act 1869. It is an example of Gothic revival architecture, and its large size bears testimony to the fact that Anglicans were formerly more numerous than they are today, although they are now part of a growing minority of non-Catholics in Ennis and County Clare. Memorials in the church include a wooden grave cross from Ypres, a reminder of World War I (1914–1918).

The church hall is accommodated in the rear of the building. This was constructed around 1982-3 during the ministry of the former Dean of Limerick Maurice Talbot. A foyer and meeting hall, with kitchen and toilets were incorporated within the Church from space at the rear of St Columba’s.
