= St. Columba's Church, Newark =

Historic church in New Jersey, United States

- St. Columba's Church
- U.S. National Register of Historic Places
- New Jersey Register of Historic Places
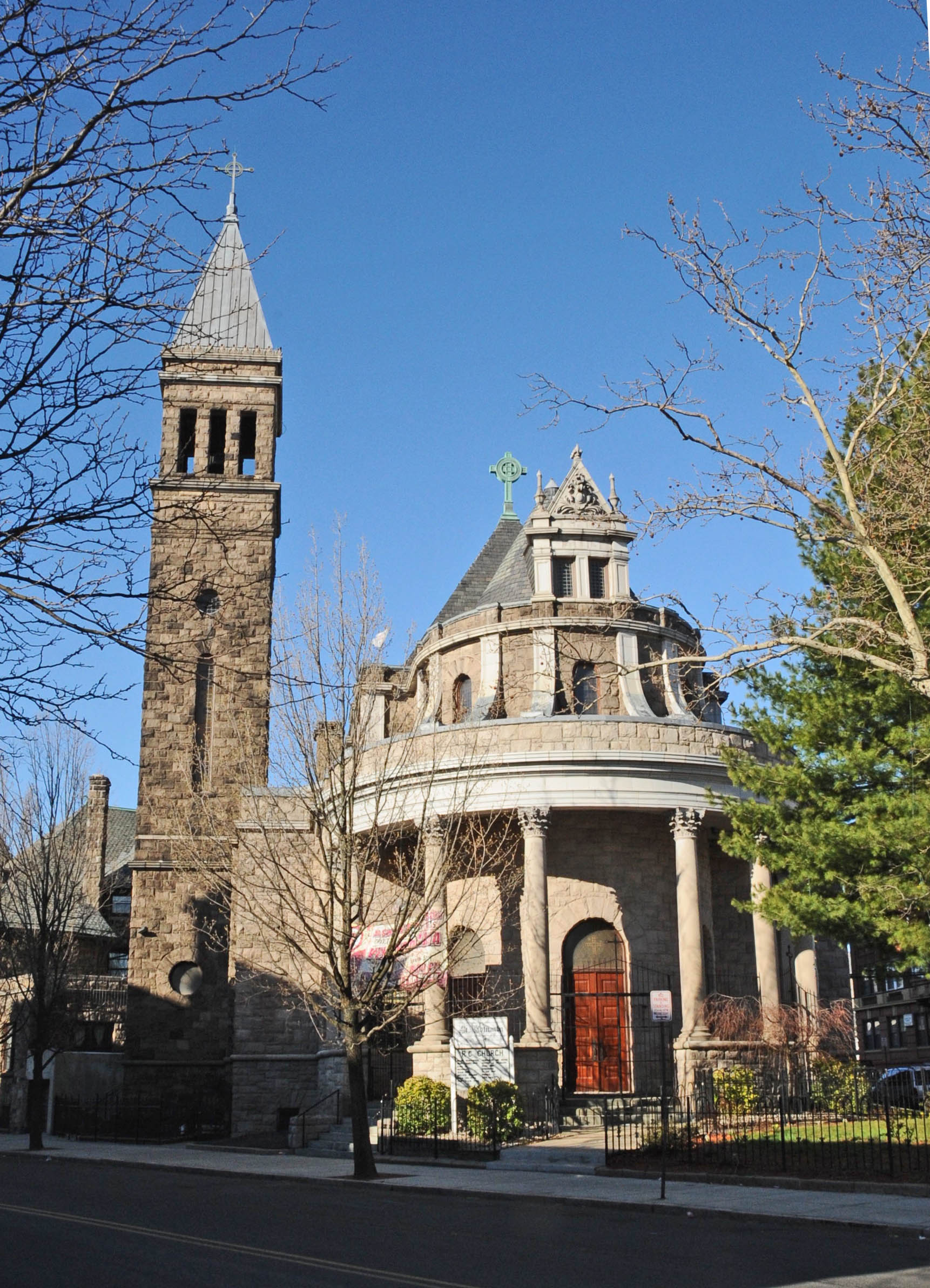

- Location within Essex County, New Jersey Location within New Jersey Location within the United States
- Location: Pennsylvania Avenue and Brunswick Street, Newark, New Jersey
- Coordinates: 40°43′28″N 74°10′49″W
- Area: 1 acre (0.40 ha)
- Built: 1871
- Architects: Edwards, Charles
- Architectural style: French & Italian Renaissance
- NRHP reference No.: 72000786
- NJRHP No.
- Added to NRHP: October 30, 1972

St. Columba's Church is a historic Roman Catholic parish church located within the Archdiocese of Newark at Pennsylvania Avenue and Brunswick Street in Newark, Essex County, New Jersey, United States.

== History ==
It was built in 1871, rebuilt in 1898 and added to the National Register of Historic Places in 1972. The church remains an active parish; the current pastor is Rev. Andres Codoner-Contell and the vicar is Rev. Drazen Hosi.

== See also ==
- National Register of Historic Places listings in Essex County, New Jersey
