= Irish Convention =

1917–18 assembly in Dublin

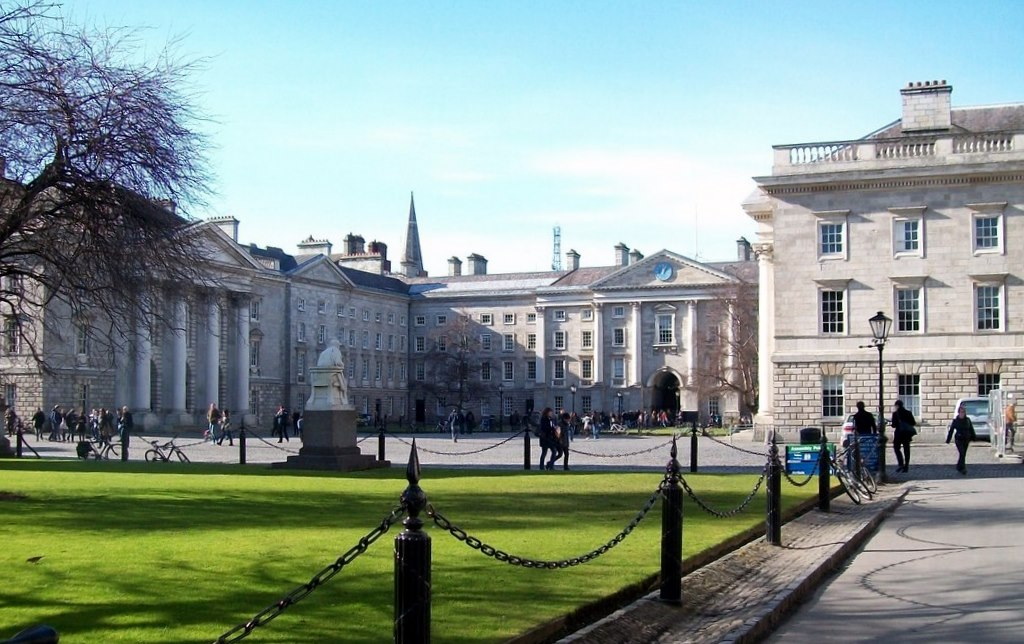
Regent House, Dublin, the site of the convention

The Irish Convention was an assembly which sat in Dublin, Ireland from July 1917 until March 1918 to address the Irish question and other constitutional problems relating to an early enactment of self-government for Ireland, to debate its wider future, discuss and come to an understanding on recommendations as to the best manner and means this goal could be achieved. It was a response to the dramatically altered Irish political climate after the 1916 rebellion and was proposed by David Lloyd George, Prime Minister of the United Kingdom of Great Britain and Ireland, in May 1917 to John Redmond, leader of the Irish Parliamentary Party, announcing that "Ireland should try her hand at hammering out an instrument of government for her own people".

The convention was publicly called in June 1917, to be composed of representative Irishmen from different political parties and spheres of interest. After months of deliberations, the convention's final report—which had been agreed upon in March 1918—was seriously undermined. With the urgent need for military manpower on the Western Front following the German spring offensive, the government decided in April 1918 to simultaneously introduce Home Rule and apply conscription to Ireland. This "dual policy" of conscription and devolution heralded the end of a political era.

== Home Rule dilemma ==
=== Multiple backdrops ===
Self-government for Ireland had been the predominant political issue between Ireland and Britain during the 1880s, spearheaded by Charles Stewart Parnell. It was reflected in three Home Rule bills, all bitterly opposed by Ulster Unionists. The first two bills were rejected by parliament, culminating in the passing of the Third Irish Home Rule Act (properly, the Government of Ireland Act 1914) on 25 May by the House of Commons of the United Kingdom. The government conceded to pressure by the Ulster leader Sir Edward Carson and introduced an Amending Bill proposed by the House of Lords, to give effect to the exclusion of Ulster constructed on the basis of county option and six-year exclusion, the same formula previously rejected by Unionists in March. On 18 September 1914 Home Rule was enacted and simultaneously postponed for the duration of the European War which erupted in August. The Ulster question was 'solved' in the same way: through the promise of amending legislation which was left undefined. Unionists were in disarray, wounded by the enactment of Home Rule and by the absence of any definite arrangement for the exclusion of Ulster.

The Great War was the single most crucial factor influencing the course of Irish history from the second decade of the 20th century, creating circumstances which led to total and irreversible political polarisation and to partition in Ireland. Initially it split the Irish Volunteers, who were raised to safeguard the granting of Home Rule and resist the secession of Ulster by the Ulster Volunteers from what they claimed was a coercive All-Ireland Home Rule settlement, into two opposing camps. These were, the larger National Volunteers – supporting the Allied war effort and subsequently in combat on the Western Front and in Gallipoli. And secondly the minority group of Volunteers who remained in Ireland and staged the Easter Rebellion in April 1916, proclaiming an Irish Republic, virtually unimaginable without the backdrop of the European conflict.

=== Belated reappraisal ===
Alarmed by the changed and volatile situation in Ireland the Prime Minister H. H. Asquith, following prolonged discussions, announced on 25 May 1916 to the House of Commons that he had agreed to undertake negotiations to bring about a permanent Home Rule settlement in Ireland. Lloyd George, then Minister for Munitions, was then sent to Dublin to offer this to the leaders of the Irish Parliamentary Party, John Redmond and John Dillon. The scheme revolved around partition, officially a temporary arrangement, as understood by Redmond. Lloyd George however gave the Ulster leader Carson a written guarantee that Ulster would not be forced in. A supreme master of political blandishment, he was able to keep the rival parties in play week after week in the hope that a settlement was at last possible. His tactic was to see that neither side would find out before a compromise was implemented. The country north and south, as well as the Cabinet, were divided on the issue. Joseph Devlin, the Ulster Nationalist leader, had won support in Belfast on 4 July for temporary exclusion of six counties.

A modified Act of 1914 as "Headings of a settlement as to the Government of Ireland" had been drawn up by the Cabinet on 17 June. The formula then had two amendments enforced on 19 July by Unionists – permanent exclusion and a reduction of Ireland's representation in the Commons. This was informed by Lloyd George on 22 July 1916 to Redmond, who accused the government of treachery. The government bowed to the combined opposition of Unionists who never had favoured partition, and the Irish party. On 27 July the scheme finally collapsed. This was decisive to the future fortunes of the Home Rule movement, the Lloyd George debacle of 22 July finished the constitutional party, overthrew Redmond's power and left him utterly demoralised. It simultaneously discredited the politics of consent and created the space for radical alternatives.

The confused position was debated at length in the House of Commons on 31 July. Nationalists and their supporters continued to demand that the Home Rule Act be implemented, and called for senior officials in Dublin to be replaced by Home Rule supporters, who would be in government anyway after the war ended. Unionists countered that, if the Act were to be implemented during the war, six Ulster counties would be excluded and would never submit to coercion; Irish unity could only come about with their consent. Asquith wrote to Redmond on 28 July "I think it is of great importance (if possible) to keep the negotiating spirit alive". But the breakdown of negotiations was inevitable and had irreparably damaged Redmond and the Irish Party.

=== Renewed urgency ===
The escalation of war losses suffered by Irish Divisions during the Battle of the Somme in July and the devastating German U-boat sinking of British merchant shipping, distracted all sides from striving further towards a settlement. On 18 October in the House of Commons, Redmond introduced a motion stating that 'the system of government at present maintained in Ireland is inconsistent with the principles for which the Allies are fighting in Europe, and has been mainly responsible for the recent unhappy events and the present state of feeling in the country'. It was defeated by 303 to 106 votes. Devlin 'pleaded for Irishmen to come together to seek agreement on resolving outstanding difficulties, which will receive the sanction of the Irish people'. This plea for a conference was to be the seed of the later Irish Convention.

On 6 December 1916 Lloyd George ousted Asquith as Prime Minister with the aid of Carson and Bonar Law and formed a new coalition government with a larger Unionist representation. When Redmond conferred with him three days later and demanded suspension of martial law in Ireland and the release of untried prisoners, Lloyd George told him he had 'no intention presently of making any move for settlement of the Irish question'. The government however announced an amnesty of Irish internees for Christmas, who returned as hardened separatists to radicalise Irish politics. This helped to further raise popularity for the growing political Sinn Féin movement, who were not directly involved in the Rising. In the early months of 1917 negotiations for an 'Irish Settlement' went on behind the scenes. Momentum continued to build sharply for a new approach after America's entry into the war on 17 April 1917. Lloyd George faced increasing pressure to settle the Irish question in deference to Irish-American sentiment, which had been isolationist, as well as to gain further Irish support for the war.

== Convention proposal ==
=== Initiative grasped ===
Then three by-election wins for Sinn Féin startled both the Irish Party and the British government. Just five days after Sinn Féin's narrow victory in the South Longford by-election, Lloyd George, in a letter on 16 May offered Redmond, William O'Brien and Carson the enactment of Home Rule for the twenty-six southern counties, or alternatively, offering 'as a last resort, a convention of Irishmen of all parties for the purpose of producing a scheme of Irish self-government'. Redmond replied turning down the proposed solution but agreeing to a conference.

Home Rule could, in a sense, have been put into place in spring 1917, but Redmond was reluctant to shoulder the burden of exclusion and hoped the eventual area to be excluded could in time be narrowed down. It was a difficult choice, as Redmond might have seized and exercised power in the twenty-six counties to the advantage of the Home Rule cause and might well have provided "the freedom to achieve freedom". His choice of a conference, all going well, could possibly secure the future of constitutional nationalism and halt the progress of the separatist movement.

In a speech on 21 May, Lloyd George announced that the government had decided to invite Irishmen to put forward their own proposals for the government of their country. It was directed to a Convention which was to consist not merely of political parties, but to be "a real representation of Irish life and activity in all their leading branches." It would be pledged that "If substantial agreement should be reached as to the character and scope of the Constitution for the future government of Ireland within the Empire", Government would "accept the responsibility for taking all the necessary steps to enable the Imperial Parliament to give legislative effect to the conclusions of the Convention". Adding that 'Ireland should now try her hand at hammering out an instrument of government for her own people'.

In his lengthy reply, Redmond made a plea for quick action: "the life of an Irish politician is one of one long series of postponements and compromise and disappointments and disillusionments.... Many of our ideals of complete, speedy and almost immediate triumph of our policy and of our cause, have faded, some almost disappeared.... We have spent forty years at this work... which will have been worth it if by this Convention we can secure substantial agreement amongst our people in Ireland." However, the omens were not the best. The Ulster Unionist John Lonsdale reiterated "that they could not and would not be driven into a Home Rule Parliament, that they relied on the pledges that they would not be coerced".

On 11 June, four days after the death of Redmond's brother Major Willie Redmond during the Battle of Messines, the composition of the convention was publicly announced, consisting of all Irish parties and interests. Bonar Law announced an amnesty on 15 June in which 120 prisoners were released "in order that the Convention may meet in an atmosphere of harmony and goodwill".

=== Broad representation ===
The Irish Convention was the fifth attempt to implement Home Rule. It brought together the enormous number of one hundred and one delegates from different political fields and other interests. From the outset, intentions, reservations and expectations differed considerably. The Nationalist MPs T. P. O'Connor and Stephen Gwynn came to the conclusion, that a Conference might be the Irish Party's only hope of salvation, if the chance of a Conference were lost 'there was nothing ahead but disaster'. The Irish Question could no longer be settled on the floor of the House of Commons.

The Catholic Hierarchy in Ireland during the year following the Rising had been split over what kind of change in national leadership the Church ought to support. After indicating on 14 June they might decline to send a delegation, the following week in Maynooth they decided in favour of attending. The delegates chosen were the Bishops Denis Kelly, Dr. Patrick O'Donnell, Harty of Cashel and Joseph MacRory. As a first step they pledged themselves to oppose 'Partition'. Dr. O'Donnell was a member and treasurer of the United Irish League

For Ulster Unionists the Irish Convention provided a dilemma. Hugh De Fellenburg Montgomery argued, that if they boycotted it, Nationalist Redmonites could produce a home rule scheme acceptable to England, with Britain insisting on Ulster's acceptance. With the recent South Longford victory for Sinn Féin they feared they might be asked to accept an Irish Republic. They even regarded a twenty-six county Irish parliament coupled with the rise of Sinn Féin a greater danger to the realm than home rule originally would have been. Edward Carson, the Ulster leader, saw those anxieties less dramatically. He pointed out that since the 1914 Act could not be repealed from the Statute Book, Ulster representatives to the convention would need:

- To secure a position for Ulster which shall be compatible with the principles for which we stand.
- To secure the acceptance by the other side of as ample safe-guard as possible for the Unionist minority under the Irish Parliament.
- In view of the fact that the principle of Home Rule for Ireland has now become the law of the land – to endeavour, if they think fit, to secure any form of Home Rule which is put into operation, shall be the best possible in the interest of Ireland and Great Britain, and free from the defects of the Act of 1914, apart from the obnoxious principle of that Act which is beyond recall.

On 8 June 350 delegates to the Ulster Unionist Conference approved participation subject to the stipulation that 'nothing in any way binding be accepted . . . without first consulting with the Ulster people'.

Southern Unionists had more limited options in view. Lord Midleton, their leading figure, was less weighed by Ulster's concerns. Before entering the Convention they had one simple goal, to prevent the 1914 Act coming into effect since it contained no provision for Southern Unionist interests. Midleton had two objectives, to avoid partition which would leave Southern unionist an isolated minority in a Catholic state. Then with the hope that the 'Irish Question' be resolved on broad 'Imperial lines', he wished to secure Ireland's utmost participation in the war. Lord Robert Cecil, a Unionist Cabinet member, observed that home rule should be granted in return for 'Redmond's patriotism throughout the war which created an honourable obligation that we ought to recognise'.

=== Nomination declined ===
Two of the invited parties would be prominent by their absence:

- Sinn Féin declined the allocated five seats on the grounds that the terms of reference of the Convention provided that Ireland must be "within the Empire", which entailed maintaining the supremacy of the British Parliament; therefore it declined until:
  - the terms of reference left it free to decree the complete independence of Ireland;
  - the British Government publicly pledged itself to the United States and the Powers of Europe to ratify the decisions of the majority of the Convention and
  - the Convention consisted of none but persons freely elected by adult suffrage in Ireland.

Sinn Féin absence was disastrous in the long term for the Irish Party, allowing it in the meantime, to consolidate its hold on the Irish electorate. The government tried to remedy the serious deficiency by including nominees, who might represent the Sinn Féin viewpoint if not the organisation, the intellectuals – George W. Russell ("Æ") the writer and Edward Lysaght. They were included at the suggestion of Thomas Spring Rice, 2nd Baron Monteagle of Brandon and his son, who had useful contacts in Sinn Féin.

- William O'Brien of the All-for-Ireland Party, who earlier championed the principle of "conference plus business" during the successful Land Conference refused to take up the two AFIL seats. He rightly predicted that such an attendance size would end in disagreement. He outlined essential conditions for success, calling for a compact panel of a dozen genuinely representative Irishmen from North and South, on the lines of the Land Conference. His proposals were not accepted. Lloyd George, Asquith, Bonar Law, T. M. Healy and others appealed to O'Brien to attend, but he declined 'to have any responsible connection with a convention so constituted'. He believed the assembly would make a 'hateful bargain for the partition of the country under a plausible disguise'. Others who refused to attend were: The Dublin Trades Council, The Cork Trade and Labour Council, the Gaelic and National League.

The opening of the convention was preceded by two by-elections, one on 6 July when the Irish party candidate was returned unopposed for the Dublin South constituency, and four days later Éamon de Valera took the Clare East seat by 5,010 to 2,035 votes, resulting from the death of Major Willie Redmond in June.

== First phase ==
=== Convention assembles ===
The first conference meeting was held on 25 July at Regent House, Trinity College Dublin, the chairmanship sought and won by Sir Horace Plunkett, attended by ninety-five delegates. Elected general secretary was Lord Southborough, employed in the secretariat were Erskine Childers, Frank Cruise O'Brien and Dermot Coffey, all close to Sinn Féin. Delegates came from a broad cross-section of Irish public life, fifty-two representing national interests. In addition nine were Southern Unionists, twenty-four Ulster Unionists. Thirty-two delegates were chairman of county councils, eight chairman of urban district councils. Fifty-three were Catholic, forty-two Protestant. At this time northern Irish Unionists held only 16 seats out of 103 at the Parliament of the United Kingdom while southern Unionists held none. Nine-tenths of the representatives at the Irish Convention were Irish Party and Ulster Unionist Party members.

A Grand Committee of twenty delegates was appointed to frame matters of procedure. After three days the Convention adjourned and reassembled as agreed on 17 August. Three main groups soon became evident. The Nationalists led by Redmond and included Joseph Devlin, Stephen Gwynn, J. J. Clancy and T. J. Harbison; to these came the four Catholic bishops and representatives from local government bodies. The second group was the Ulster Unionists with H. T. Barrie MP as their chairman, followed by the third group, the Southern Unionists led by Lord Midleton. A handful of delegates were unaligned such as William Martin Murphy, proprietor and director of the Irish Independent, Lysaght and Russell ("Æ"). It was hoped to draw up a scheme in which the various viewpoints expressed would meet the Prime Minister's stipulation that the future government of Ireland would be within the Empire.

=== Diverse presentations ===
Plunkett followed an agenda during the first six-week "Presentation Phase" focused on matters commanding near unanimity, which narrowed the question of where differences were most. Delegates were given the freedom to become acquainted on a social basis which helped breakdown suspicion between Protestants and Catholics, augmented by invitations from the Mayors of Cork and Belfast to hold presentations during the eighteen initial sittings, twelve in Dublin, three in Belfast and three in Cork. In Belfast and Cork Redmond spoke at length on the perils of a breakdown, making many proposals on which agreement could be reached – adding on conclusion "Far better for us and for the Empire never to have met than to have met and failed of an agreement." The Catholic prelates, wishing to avoid conflict spoke on fiscal and economic matters, and disregarded what most Ulster Protestants wished to hear, some indication that the Church might modify what they regarded as her unreasonable insistence upon absolute clerical control and rigid denominational segregation in the schools. Archbishop Harty made it clear, that in this area where they could have eased tensions, they had no intention of departing from their hardline attitudes, which many Protestants believed fostered animosities which later blocked a settlement. A dark shadow was cast over events by the death of Thomas Ashe, a Sinn Féin leader who had been on hunger strike. Widespread hostile demonstrations were raised at the end of September against the convention, particularly Redmond and Devlin, which unsettled the Unionists, causing considerable harm.

== Second phase ==
=== Grand Committee ===
Eventually it was agreed on 25 September to submit further negotiations to a new sub-committee, a senior 'Committee of Nine' (close to O’Brien's proposal). By the end of this first phase Plunkett believed that 'the discussion had been really fruitful in hardening the heart of the south and softening the head of the north'. Before adjournment of the Presentation Stage the Grand Committee was restructured to contain the most important and capable figures, Plunkett as an ex officio member, its secretary Lord Southborough, with the members falling into the following categories:

- Ulster Unionists: H. T. Barrie MP, Lord Londonderry (secretary of the Ulster delegation), H. McD. Pollock, Sir Alexander McDowell, Rev. John Irvin, Moderator of the General Assembly
- Southern Unionists: Lord Midleton, Lord MacDonnell, John Powell, Most Rev. John H. Bernard, Church of Ireland Archbishop of Dublin
- Nationalists: John Redmond MP, J. J. Clancy MP, Joseph Devlin MP, Stephen Gwynn MP, Most Rev. Patrick O'Donnell, Catholic Bishop of Raphoe, Most Rev. Denis Kelly, Catholic Bishop of Ross
- Independent Nationalists: William Martin Murphy, Edward E. Lysaght, George W. Russell ('AE')
- Labour: James McCarron, Robert Waugh

During the first phase divisions within the Convention became exposed. The need for some measure of local control over Ulster affairs to be offered to the Ulstermen had been resisted from the outset by the bishops. A proposal made during the presentation phase, a scheme modelled on the federal system of Switzerland by Lord Londonderry was equally rejected by the bishops. The fundamental cause of alarm for the Northern bishops was the danger of a Protestant dominated Ulster administration, even in the case where Ulster had some measure of autonomy in an all-Ireland settlement.

Differences over whether Ireland should have complete fiscal autonomy or the customs and excise duties to be retained by the Imperial Parliament then came to the fore and threatened to completely disrupt the convention. The bishops held rigidly to full fiscal autonomy for an Irish parliament. Bishop O'Donnell proposed a plan for Ulster Unionist of an additional twelve nominated representatives in an Irish parliament, and a further twelve for the Southern Unionists, limited to ten years and a joint British-Irish Commission to negotiate a customs union between the two countries. From the moment the "O'Donnell scheme" became the basis of discussion, provincial federalism ceased to be one of the possible options before the convention.

=== Committee of Nine ===
When the Grand Committee met on 11 October at the opening of the second phase, it was proposed by Sir Alexander McDowell that the "Committee of Nine", composed of Redmond, Devlin, O'Donnell (Nationalists), Murphy, Russell (Independents), Barrie, Londonderry, McDowell (Ulster Unionists), and Midleton (Southern Unionists), should convene to negotiate, formulate and draft proposals for an agreed scheme for the government of Ireland. Also to discuss the Bishop's scheme, other sub-committees to deal with matters such as land purchase, police and electoral systems. Plunkett felt that Ulster Unionists were beginning to engage after the new sub-committee was formed to concentrate on the two major obstacles, fiscal policy and Ulster. McDowell was an expert negotiator and had the confidence of both the Ulster Unionist Council and was on good terms with Redmond. Unfortunately his sudden death ended his good work. But by the end of October, with the exception of fiscal powers, the sub-committee arrived at provisional agreement on nearly every vital point, with Redmond in the belief that a final agreement was in sight.

On 7 November, the Committee having reached agreement on most points, Ulster delegates conferred with their "Advisory Committee" of the Ulster Unionist Committee, who reported back 17 November that they disapproved of nominated representatives to a Lower House as a safeguard (whereby it was agreed that Unionists were to get forty per cent of the seats in an Irish House of Commons), "but they undertook to bring forward their own proposals for safeguarding Ulster's interests by means other than extra representation". At this point a major blunder was made by Plunkett, who, instead of waiting eagerly for the Ulster proposals, diverted the discussion on to fiscal policies, where major disagreement resulted between Ulster and Nationalists. On 21 November the Committee of Nine reported to the Grand Committee "that...a basis for agreement proved unsuccessful". With that the opportunity was lost to have Ulster Unionists fulfil their earlier undertaking to submit a scheme for their safeguard.

=== Midleton Plan ===
It then became apparent by late November that a fleeting breakthrough could yet be attained when Lord Midleton, the moderate leader of the Southern Unionists, alarmed by the rise of militant separatism and the high losses on the war front, in an effort to break the deadlock on the fiscal question, proposed on 22 November a Home Rule settlement without partition, in which an Irish parliament, with minority safeguards for Ulster, would have full control of internal taxes, administration, legislation, judicature and the police, but not of customs and excise. Opposition to the "Midleton Plan" came not only from the Ulster delegates but from a majority of the nationalists led by Bishop O'Donnell who still held out for full fiscal autonomy. Actually Lord Midleton and his colleagues, unlike the other two parties, said that the Southern Unionists were genuinely working for a settlement within the Convention avoiding pressures from the outside, were trying to take a middle position, to allow reasonable members of the Nationalists and Ulster Unionist to join them, to meet the government's "substantial agreement" formula. Redmond and Devlin were leaning toward aligning themselves with Midleton.

== Third phase ==
=== Fiscal crux ===
During December Lloyd George became more directly involved opening the third phase of the convention, when Midleton and the Church of Ireland Archbishop, Bernard, met the Prime Minister on 5 December. Redmond wrote to the latter on 11 December to press him to support the proposed compromise fiscal scheme. Redmond had tried to rescue what remained of his hopes by moving further and further from his own supporters in an attempt to reach some common understanding with his opponents. Especially his appeal to Lloyd George to put pressure on the Ulster Unionists should the Convention agree on some workable solution. Redmond persisted desperately to come to an agreement with the Southern Unionists. The make and break point revolved solely around the control of customs and excise. Supporting this, and prompting the Nationalist to acceptance, was the advance made by the Southern Unionists, who, against their own convictions, had come forward with their offer to help Nationalists in attaining what they desired.

=== Renewed offer ===
When the full Convention met on 18 December just before the recess, Midleton made an address in which his scheme further conceded to Ireland the control of excise in addition to all purely Irish services. Merely customs and defence were to remain for the period of the war with the Imperial Parliament, thereafter to be decided by a joint commission. He appealed to both Nationalists and Northern Unionists to seek agreement on these lines. Redmond, already very ill, was waylaid through indisposition and a snow storm in his home in the Wicklow hills and could not attend. The fears of those present were that should the proposals be adopted, the decision would be exposed to attack by a combination of three forces personified by: Sinn Féin, who would condemn anything other than complete separation; the Hierarchy, as represented by Bishop O'Donnell; and by William Martin Murphy and his Independent (the most widely read nationalist paper in Ireland).

The Ulster delegations leader, Barrie, had disclosed occasional interest in doing a deal. At this time he was beginning to talk privately about the possibility of an all-Ireland parliament, and a unitary settlement. Differences between Ulster Unionists and nationalist at this time were not over the issue of partition, but over taxing powers of a likely Irish parliament. Control of customs continued to be widely seen as an essential feature of national self- determination. Despite restraints, there were instants during which agreement might have been reached. Sir Edward Carson, crucially, seems to have regarded a unitary settlement with a degree of sympathy at this time.

The Convention finally turned out to be more than an elitist talking-shop, although an understanding took a long time in coming, yet a form of consensus was for a moment attained with a deal near to being struck. For a brief period during December – until early January 1918 – it looked as if Midleton's initiative would provide the basis for a political breakthrough, with justification for believing that the convention was moving towards an agreed settlement.

Ulster's Bishop O'Donnell moved into the Nationalist leadership vacuum and held out against any compromise on fiscal autonomy, circulating a memorandum to all members of the convention to this effect. Plunkett wrote to Redmond – "The Bishop of Raphoe is determined not to come to terms with Lord Midleton". He was 'exceedingly doubtful about conditional acceptance until we know the North makes good the condition' the bishop wrote in a letter to Redmond on 27 December, and recommended 'before we give anything away – I should be inclined to keep the Convention in session for a considerable time fashioning out a reasonable instrument of Irish government'.

=== Verge of agreement ===
On 1 January 1918 Midleton returned from London with a written pledge drafted by Lord Desart and initialled by Lloyd George, that if the Southern Unionist scheme were carried by substantial agreement (i.e. by all except Ulster), the Prime Minister would use his influence to give it legislative effect. When the Convention re-assembled on 4 January 1918, at the close of the debate Redmond rose to make a powerful plea to the convention for agreement and to table an amendment that supported the Midleton Plan as a settlement of the Irish question, under the strict condition that the government commit itself to giving legislative effect to the deal, which would mean enforcing it on Ulster.

Ulster Unionists, influenced by their southern counterparts, wavered towards a settlement, as indicated by Berrie's assurances to Midleton the previous day. Many at the time (including Midleton) thought that a deal was in the offing. Everything hinged upon timing, a speedy settlement was essential. There was considerable feeling that the convention was on the verge of a settlement. At this point a major error of judgment was again made by the chairman Horace Plunkett when he intervened and rather than clearing the timetable to rush through a division and vote on agreement, he asserted his authority, insisting it was too early to take a vote and diverted by initiating a lengthy debate on land purchase. The only positive outcome of this debate was that it formed the basis of the later Free State's Land Act (1923). Lord Southborough, who as Convention secretary was in touch with all groups, believed that if a division had been taken just then, Ulster might have even come in, at most only two negative votes would have been cast. Midleton blamed Plunkett as being a 'stickler for forms'.

== Crucial setbacks ==
=== Settlement blocked ===
Before the next decisive debate on 15 January, adversaries of the proposed settlement, which included Murphy, Lysaght and Russell, gained ground. On 14 January the northern nationalist representatives Bishop O'Donnell and Joseph Devlin had joined forces and informed Redmond, whose health had kept him in seclusion for ten days since his speech, of their opposition to his amendment in the absence of an advance agreement from Ulster to 'come in'. Redmond, when he rose to make his address, rather than divide the nationalists, withdrew his proposal. His last words to the astonished assembly were, ' . . . that some important Nationalist representatives are against this course – the Catholic bishops, Mr. Devlin – and others. I must face the situation – at which I am surprised; and I regret it. . . . Therefore, I must avoid pressing my motion. . . . I feel that I can be of no further service to the Convention . . . .'

Nationalists were now seen as the obstructers by which the Midleton Plan failed to win unanimity. On 21 January Carson left the Cabinet over a vague offer by the government to assist the convention to 'finally reach a basis of agreement which would enable a new Irish Constitution to come into operation with the consent of all parties'. He was afraid that a settlement would be imposed and that Lloyd George was doing nothing to allay his fears. His resignation was also over differences about the conduct of the war. Lloyd George in a letter that day to Plunkett, expressed his grave concern at the lack of progress towards reaching an agreed settlement, and extended an invitation for a representation of the differing groups to confer with the Cabinet, to enable a new Irish Constitution to come into operation with the consent of all parties.

=== Critical stage ===
During February the government played a more active role in negotiations. The Armagh South by-election on 2 February appeared to improve Redmond's fortunes when the Irish Party won over Sinn Féin by 2,324 votes to 1,305. Lloyd George, Bonar Law and Lord Curzon of Kedleston met Midleton, Bernard and Dezart on 6 February. The Southern Unionists emphasised that one thing Ireland would not accept was partition. On 13 February the Prime Minister then met the invited delegation from the convention. He pointed out that wartime necessitated that fiscal relations remain as they are until its conclusion, and that a settlement was only possible if partition was ruled out. Carson in the meantime, wrote to Lloyd George urging that a federal settlement be reached, who took this as a signal of movement within the Ulster Unionist camp. He then wrote to Barrie, leader of the Ulster delegation, on 21 February imploring his side to seek a solution, to make concessions, hinting that Home Rule for Ireland would be merely the first step in a wider federal reform of British government.

With a lengthy letter to Plunkett on 25 February, read next day to the Convention when it reassembled, which began with a definite pledge of action. On receiving the report of the convention the Government would "proceed with the least possible delay to submit legislative proposals to Parliament". He outlined his formula for a compromise – customs and excise remain as they are until two years after the war, a Royal Commission deciding on an appropriate settlement, there would be an increase in Unionist representation in an Irish Parliament, with an Ulster Committee empowered to modify or veto legislation 'not consonant with the interests of Ulster'. Included in his package was a future bill to settle land purchase, and a substantial provision for resolving urban housing. His letter made a limited impression on Ulster Unionists, having stressed, that he was determined to legislate upon receipt of the convention's report, emphasising the urgent importance of a settlement by consent, but that controversial questions would have to be deferred until after the war. Cardinal Logue of Armagh, who devotedly had hoped for some alternative to Sinn Féin, dismissed Lloyd George's letter and the suggested safeguards for Ulster as 'disguised partition'. In view of the new situation created by Lloyd George's letter, Midleton's scheme was dropped.

=== Deadlock impasse ===
The various sides now gained time to reconsider and recoup, with the earlier momentum lost, committees came under the influence of outside institutions and hard-liners. Ulstermen who had been under pressure to settle, reverted to a hardline stand, without appearing to have ruined the Midleton deal. Barrie, the Unionist leader who had wavered towards doing a deal, was summonsed with his delegates to Belfast to meet their "advisory committee" on 25 February and told to hold to traditional partitionist demands. Midleton was undermined by hardliners who formed a "Southern Unionist Committee", publishing a 'Call to Unionists' on 4 March, which reinforced a fundamentalist line.

There had been but one way open for Redmond to preserve the future of the nationalist party. This was any scheme which would set up a body clearly labelled "Irish parliament" embracing representatives from all thirty–two counties. Redmond therefore acted properly by supporting the 'Midleton Plan'. Were it not for the O'Donnell-Devlin revolt there was a fair chance for realisation of the scheme. Had they not revolted but instead led Nationalists, Southern Unionists, labour delegates and perhaps the odd independent-minded Ulstermen, Lloyd George might just have enacted the Midleton scheme. Midleton had influential political connections in England, his scheme backed by Lord Northcliffe (the press baron who had helped topple Asquith) and his organisation. Northcliffe was in a position to transform the Nationalist-Southern-Unionist agreement into practical politics at Downing Street. It was of necessity for the party to grasp this last chance of survival, which manifestly did not apply to the church.

=== Clerical opposition ===
The question of O'Donnell the ecclesiastic and O'Donnell the politician are difficult to distinguish, whatever responsibility for the failure of the Convention he bears seem to lie with his ecclesiastic role. The bishops made plain their opposition to a Swiss federal system, under which Ulster would be a kind of Protestant canton, and O'Donnell went to great length to frame a scheme that would exclude any provincial autonomy, which exposed a basic nationalist misunderstanding of Ulster. Ulster's objection to Home Rule had always been that it would set up not a democratic, but a theocratic state.

O'Donnell called a meeting of Nationalists on 5 March and tried to obtain a final declaration against compromise and in favour of full fiscal claims. At this point, in Plunkett's view, O'Donnell and Murphy 'tried to rush the convention on to the rocks'. Many delegates were now drifting back to Redmond's view, and against the likelihood of a renewed division into Nationalists and Unionists. At this point Redmond, who had undergone an operation, died on 6 March in London. Redmond, an eloquent voice for conciliation was silenced, his final tragic word to the convention was – "Better for us never to have met than to have met and failed".

Redmond's place as speaker of the moderate Nationalists was taken by Stephen Gwynn who had been called back from the war front the previous year to participate in a compromise with the Southern Unionists. Redmond was followed as leader the Parliamentary Party on 13 March by John Dillon who was less consensual and more sympathetic to the aspirations and strategies of Sinn Féin.

== Fourth phase ==
=== Hopes dashed ===
When the Convention reassembled after Redmond's funeral on 12 March opening its fourth phase, a resolution was put forward by Lord MacDonnell, a moderate home ruler, that Irish control of customs and excise should be postponed until after the war, on condition such control should come into automatic effect three years after cessation of hostilities. The closing text of the Report of the Proceedings of the IRISH CONVENTION had been drafted by MacDonnell with the statement:

"If the Report of the Grand Committee be dealt with in the way indicated the Convention will be in an advantageous position to review the whole situation; and to afford to the Ulster delegates a further opportunity of suggesting additions to, or modifications in, the scheme which the interests of Ulster may seem to them to call for. If any additions are deemed desirable, it seems to me dictated they might advantageously follow the line indicated in my proposals for a Provisional Grand Committee. I would add that such a Grand Committee ought not at the outset to be created on the basis of a permanent arrangement, but as an arrangement to be called into operation ad hoc. My expectations are that it will rarely or never be needed. My hope is that Ulster will find in a United Parliament for Ireland a body scrupulously ready to respond to every reasonable demand of Ulster. MACDONNELL. March 8, 1918."

The first division in eight months was however taken on Bishop O’Donnell's resolution, that 'the matters specified as unfitted for immediate legislation' (i.e. Irish control of customs and excise be postponed). The votes were 38 moderates in favour, 34 hardliners against, just a majority of four moderates over the extremists. The moderates consisted of 21 Nationalists (led by Gwynn), 10 Southern Unionists, 4 labour and 3 independents. The minority composed of 17 Nationalists, three bishops (Kelly was indisposed), Devlin, Murphy and 17 Ulster Unionists. After which the Convention went on to consider O'Donnell's scheme, clause by clause. Bishop O'Donnell demonstrated once again that his only answer to Ulster's demands for safeguards was more and more undemocratic expedients.

=== Safeguards rejected ===
The political calculations of the government for an agreed solution among the Irish was dealt a set-back when at the same time, Ulster Unionists presented the convention with a plan for the exclusion of nine counties. Ulster regarded O'Donnell's action on 15 January as the decisive blow to hopes for success. The January crisis only arose however, because of the convention's failure to enter serious negotiations on safeguards for Ulster. It wrote off any good feeling the Ulster delegation had built up, Ulstermen had come to respect Redmond during the convention and to regard him as not a bad alternative to de Valera. Until he was suddenly dramatically overthrown by the bishops (in coalition with Devlin, the Nationalist most disliked in Ulster), intensively reviving all the old fears of clericalism in a future Irish state. This ended any meaningful dialogue with Ulster.

The fiscal question continued to be dealt with from 13 March and twenty one resolutions of provisional agreement adopted. A week later, in the Waterford City by-election on 22 March, William Redmond, son of John Redmond, defeated the Sinn Féin nominee to fill his father's seat (by 1,242 votes to 745). The Irish party took further heart by a victory of its candidate over Sinn Féin in the Tyrone East by-election on 3 April (with 1,802 votes to 1,222).

== Fifth and final phase ==
=== Europe intervenes ===
Just at this moment a fatal blow to the convention was delivered by the dramatically deteriorated military situation on the Western Front. Home Rule became hostage to the massive German Spring Offensive of 21 March which swept all before it, their Operation Michael breaking through Hubert Gough's Fifth Army and the 16th (Irish) Division on 24 March and it seemed would reach the Channel coast. Between 21 March and the end of April the British Army lost more than 300,000 men.

Just at the moment the final Convention report signed 8 April, carried by sixty-six votes to thirty-four (short of a 'substantial agreement'), marking the final phase of the convention, arrived in Downing Street, the ensuing need for military manpower led the cabinet to extend conscription to include Ireland. The main document called for the immediate establishment of self-government by an Irish Ministry consisting of two houses, with special provisions for southern and northern Unionists. It was accompanied by two minority reports along with five 'notes'. Resolution of the Irish question therefore became intertwined with the military manpower crisis. Lloyd George and his Cabinet agreed to simultaneously introduce Home Rule and apply conscription in Ireland.

The fact that the government linked the implementation of the report with the enactment of conscription ruined both the credibility of the convention and any residual interest for Home Rule. It spelt the end of Home Rule as a popular cause. This "dual policy" of conscription and devolution heralded the end of a political era, the context for a wider federalist debate was at once overhauled. Its dualism signalled the end of All-Ireland Home Rule and the end of an optional federal engagement with Ireland, which had it succeeded and if the convention's Report had been implemented in full, would have established a novel form of federal government at the heart of Europe

Although the Convention appeared to have failed in its immediate objective, it generated ideas and reactions and revealed standpoints that had an independent and lasting significance.

=== Prolonged crisis ===
On 11 April government ministers formed a cabinet committee to supervise the drafting of Home Rule as recommended by the convention. The committee was chaired by Walter Long, self-claimed to be the best informed person on Irish affairs, also a champion of federalism, a lifelong Unionist and committed adversary of Home Rule. In particular his manipulative interpretation of the negotiated agreement in July 1916 between Redmond and Carson had created an ambiguity which caused them to repudiate it. On 16 April 1918 the Military Service (Ireland) Bill passed into law. The prospect of All-Ireland Home Rule being introduced led Carson to agree with Nationalists – that Ireland had suffered from nothing in its history as much as the 'broken pledges of British statesmen'. In contrast he supported conscription, because he saw no more detestable domination than that which the Germans were trying to impose.

On the official announcement of the dual policy of Home Rule and conscription, Dillon and O'Brien led their party members out of the Commons and returned to Ireland. The Home Rulers united with Sinn Féin in the anti-conscription pledge of 21 April at the height of the Conscription Crisis, at the Dublin Mansion House Conference and the great one-day strike and demonstration of 23 April. Dillon believed that Lloyd George had 'let HELL loose in Ireland' as part of a Machiavellian plot to evade his promise to grant home rule. This radicalisation of the Home Rule movement came too late to stem the electoral swing. Arthur Griffith, founder of Sinn Féin, defeated the Home Ruler in the East Cavan by-election on 20 June.

The failure of the German offensives after American intervention and success of the Allied counteroffensives led to a significant improvement in the British situation on the Western Front, permitting the cabinet by 20 June to postpone the implementation of its dual policy of Home Rule and conscription for All-Ireland.

== Transformed realities ==
=== Nation divided ===
The war, its duration, the suspension of the Home Rule Act, particularly the conscription crisis drastically increased support for Sinn Féin, the numbers of people joining its branches rising immeasurably. For Unionists the war confirmed all their pre-war suspicions that Irish Nationalists could no longer be trusted, contrasting the Easter Rising with their blood sacrifice during the Battle of the Somme, the conscription crisis providing a watershed for Ulster Unionists to withdraw securely into their northern citadel.

With the end of the war and the German Armistice on 11 November 1918, and with Sinn Féin winning a majority of seats in the December election, the government faced its obligation under the Home Rule suspensory measure of 1914, to return to the Irish question. It became apparent that to adopt the recommendations of the Convention Report a fourth Home Rule Act was required. Delay in Government action resulted from the primary need to be first engaged with the Versailles Peace Conference which needed to be concluded and signed in July 1919. The parliamentary summer recess followed, so that when the Cabinet's designated "Long Committee for Ireland" began its work in September 1919, it was nearly a year behind recent political events in Ireland.

In the meantime, the Dublin Castle administration was confronted from 21 January 1919 with the separatist Dáil Parliament of the Irish Republic in Dublin. In addition hereto with militant Republican volunteers acting independently of the Dáil, beginning with the Soloheadbeg Ambush on the day the First Dáil convened. It heralded in the beginning of the Irish War of Independence with systematic attacks on British government forces across Ireland, the members of the Royal Irish Constabulary bearing the brunt of the attacks.

The Long Committee decided by October 1919, that two Irish parliaments should be established, including a Council of Ireland, a mechanism for the "encouragement of Irish unity", optionally in a Federation or as a Dominion, beginning with the partition of the entire nine Ulster counties. The committee thereby adopting much of the recommendation contained in the March 1918 Irish Convention Report.

=== Home Rule after-life ===
By February 1920 Ulster unionist politicians stated again that they would only claim six counties, whereby Long offered the Ulstermen a deal (in return for their votes) 'that the Six Counties ... should be theirs for good ... and no interference with the boundaries ...'. The resulting Fourth Home Rule Bill, enacted as the Government of Ireland Act 1920, which closely followed the Long's committee report, received Royal Assent on 23 December 1920, and came into effect on 3 May 1921 with the elections to the two new home-rule parliaments for Northern Ireland and Southern Ireland. However, the latter parliament for the twenty-six counties never met as such. The partition of Ireland under the Act was in place months before the negotiations effecting the Anglo-Irish Treaty were struck on 6 December 1921, by which the south was granted dominion status as the Irish Free State. The inevitable "loss" of the claimed 32-county Irish Republic and the Northern Ireland six counties became catalysts in starting the Irish Civil War.

The new Parliament of Northern Ireland, protégé of the Irish Convention, opened on 22 June 1921, and was portrayed as a loyalist triumph for years of patriotism and sacrifice. The paradox was that Ulster Unionists now had the Home Rule system that they had opposed since the 1840s, ideally preferring to remain within the metropolitan United Kingdom. Home Rule did not die in 1916, in 1918, or in 1921. It enjoyed a form of after-life in Northern Ireland up until 1972. In the south the former Home Ruler politicians relocated themselves within the two main parties of the new Free State, which became Fine Gael and Fianna Fáil, where the old Home Rule Party's constitutional, ethnic, ideological and structural legacies continued to survive.

== Reading and sources ==
- Report of the Proceedings of the Irish Convention. Command papers. Vol. Cd.9019. Dublin: HMSO. 1918 – via Internet Archive.
- Fleming, N. C.: Old and New Unionism, War and the Irish Convention in: Boyce, D. George & O'Day, Alan: Ireland in Transition (1867–1921), Routledge (2004) ISBN 978-0-415-33258-3
- Gwynn, Stephen: John Redmond's last Years Ch. VIII "The Irish Convention and the End" pp. 259–341, Edward Arnold, London (1919)
- Gwynn, Denis, The History of Partition, Browne and Nolan Ltd, Dublin (1950)
- Hennessey, Thomas: Dividing Ireland, World War I and Partition, Ch. 6: The Irish Convention and the conscription crisis, 1917–18, Routledge (1998) ISBN 978-0-415-17420-6
- Jackson, Alvin: Home Rule, An Irish History 1800–2000, Ch. 9: Changing the Question 1916–20, Weidenfeld & Nicolson (2003) ISBN 978-0-7538-1767-4
- Lyons, F. S. L.: John Dillon, Ch. 12–14, Routledge & Kegan Paul, London (1968) SBN 7100 2887 3
- Meleady, Dermot: Redmond the Parnellite, University Press (2008) ISBN 978-1-85918-423-3
- Miller, Dr. David W.: Church, State and Nation in Ireland 1898–1921, Ch. XVII: The Irish Convention, Gill & Macmillan (1973) ISBN 978-0-7171-0645-5
- O'Day, Alan: Irish Home Rule 1862–1921, Attempts to implement Home Rule, 1914–18, Manchester University Press (1998) ISBN 978-0-7190-3776-4
