= James McDevitt =

Catholic Bishop of Raphoe, Ireland

James McDevitt (1831 in Glenties – 5 April 1879 in Letterkenny) was an Irish Roman Catholic Bishop in the last third of the 19th century.

McDevitt was educated at St Patrick's College, Maynooth and ordained priest on 18 June 1859. He received the degree of Doctor of Divinity (DD). He served on the staff of All Hallows College, Dublin, until his appointment as Bishop of Raphoe on 24 February 1871. McKevitt was consecrated on 30 April that year. He died in post on 5 January 1879.

Catholic Church titles
Preceded by Daniel McGettigan	Bishop of Raphoe; 1871–1879	Succeeded by Michael Logue
