= Daniel McGettigan =

Catholic Archbishop of Armagh

The Most Reverend Daniel McGettigan,
- Archbishop of Armagh; Primate of All Ireland
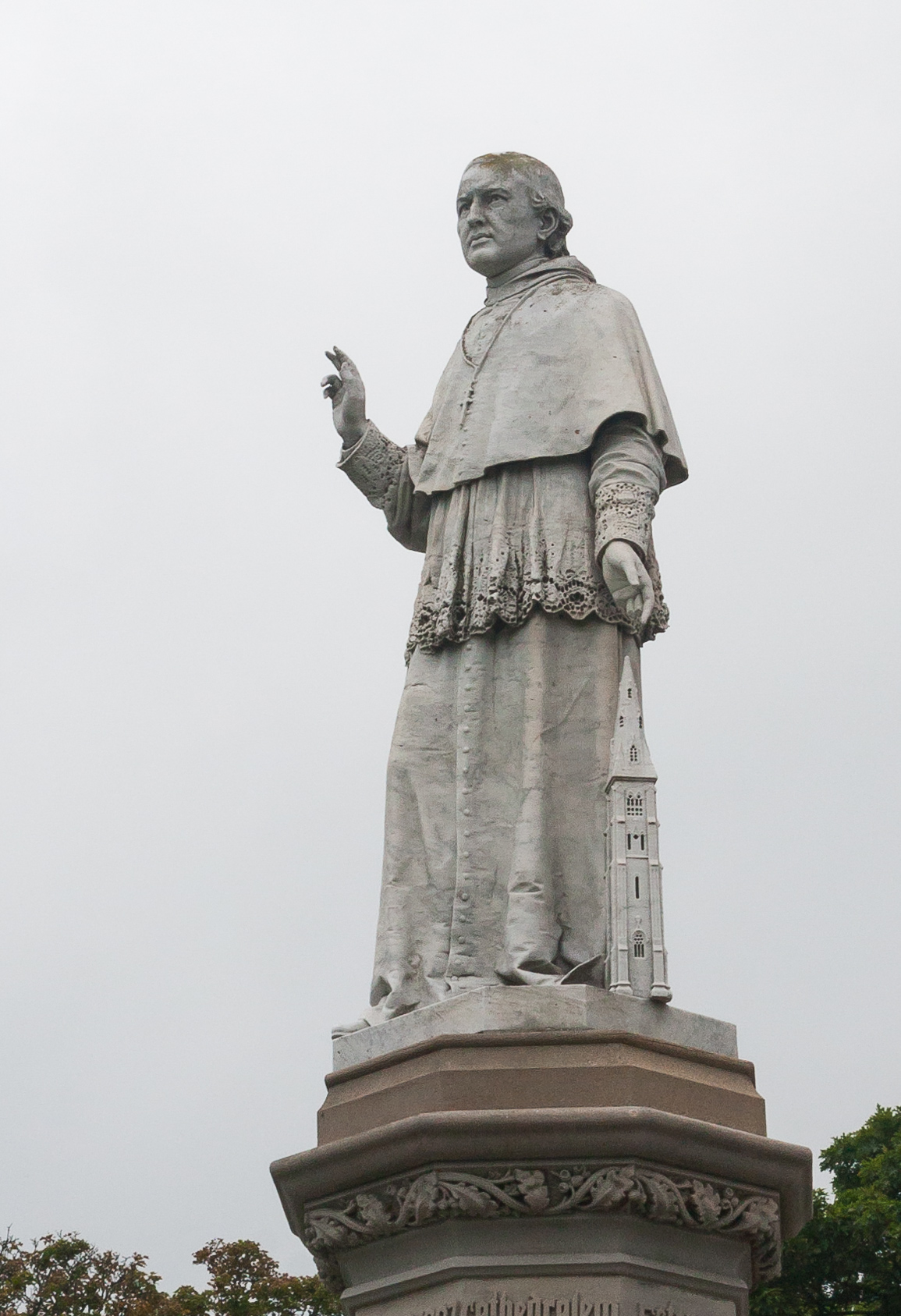
- Statue of Daniel McGettigan in front of his cathedral in Armagh, created c. 1904 by Pietro Lazzarini
- Archdiocese: Armagh
- Installed: 1870
- Term ended: 1887
- Predecessor: Michael Kieran
- Successor: Michael Logue

Orders
- Ordination: 1839 (Priest)
- Consecration: 18 May 1856 (Bishop)

Personal details
- Born: 15 November 1815 Mevagh, County Donegal
- Died: 3 December 1887 (aged 72) County Armagh
- Denomination: Roman Catholic Church
- Parents: Manasses McGettigan and Mary Boyle

Daniel McGettigan (1815–1887) was an Irish prelate of the Roman Catholic Church. He served Bishop of Raphoe from 1861 to 1870 and Archbishop of Armagh from 1870 to 1887.

== Early life ==
Born in Mevagh, County Donegal on 15 November 1815, he was the son of Manasses McGettigan and Mary Boyle. He was educated at Kildare Street Society School in Mevagh, a classical school in Derry, the seminary in Navan, and St Patrick's College, Maynooth. As a student he adhered to the Gallican doctrine.

== Priest ==
He was ordained to the priesthood by Patrick McGettigan, Bishop of Raphoe in 1839. He was appointed a curate at Inver in October 1839, followed by as a curate at Letterkenny in March 1840, and then the parish priest in Ballyshannon in June 1855.

== Bishop and Archbishop ==
He was appointed Coadjutor Bishop of Raphoe and Titular Bishop of Geras by the Holy See on 18 February 1856 and consecrated to the Episcopate on 18 May 1856. The principal consecrator was Archbishop Joseph Dixon of Armagh. On the death of Patrick McGettigan, he succeeded as Diocesan Bishop of Raphoe on 1 May 1860. He translated to the Archdiocese of Armagh by the Holy See on 6 March 1870.

McGettigan served as one of the 693 Council Fathers to Pope Pius IX during the First Vatican Council. Daniel McGettigan refused a red hat from Pope Pius IX and Pope Leo XIII; he did not feel worthy. McGettigan was the last Primate of All Ireland not to be a Prince of the Church.

In his time in Armagh the Cathedral was completed & dedicated on 24 August 1873. McGettigan oversaw the construction of the seven-terraced flight of steps leading from the Cathedral gates to the west door. In the years following he raised funds for, and eventually opened both Archbishop’s House (Ara Coeli) in 1876/7 and Sacristan’s Lodge inside the Cathedral gates 1884-6.

== Bibliography ==
- Brady, W. Maziere (1876). The Episcopal Succession in England, Scotland and Ireland, A.D. 1400 to 1875. Vol. 2. Rome: Tipografia Della Pace.

Catholic Church titles
| Preceded by Alexander Goss | Titular Bishop of Geras; 1856–1861 | Succeeded by Victor-Joseph Doutreloux |
| Preceded by Patrick McGettigan | Bishop of Raphoe; 1861–1870 | Succeeded by James McDevitt |
| Preceded by Michael Kieran | Archbishop of Armagh and Primate of All Ireland; 1870–1887 | Succeeded by Michael Logue |
