= Joseph MacRory =

Irish Cardinal (1861–1945)

His Eminence Joseph Cardinal MacRory
- Cardinal, Archbishop of Armagh; Primate of All Ireland
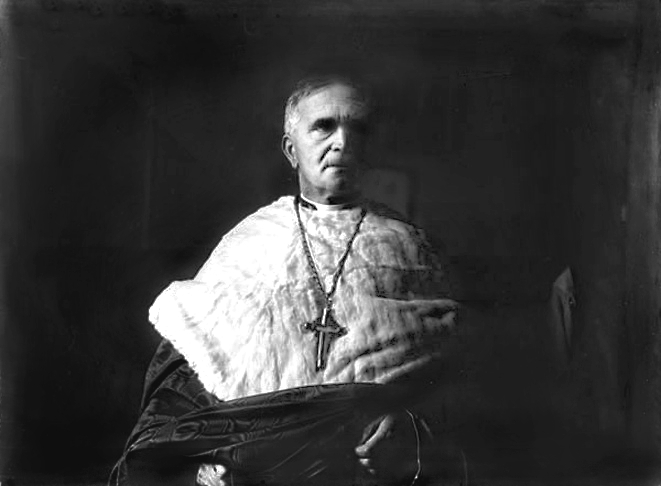
- See: Armagh
- Installed: 1928
- Term ended: 1945
- Predecessor: Patrick Cardinal O'Donnell
- Successor: John Cardinal D'Alton
- Other post: Bishop of Down and Connor 1915–1928

Orders
- Ordination: 13 September 1885 (Priest)
- Consecration: 14 November 1915 (Bishop)
- Created cardinal: 16 December 1929
- Rank: Cardinal priest of San Giovanni a Porta Latina

Personal details
- Born: 19 March 1861 Ballygawley, County Tyrone, Ireland
- Died: 13 October 1945 (aged 84) Armagh, Northern Ireland
- Buried: St Patrick's Cathedral Cemetery, Armagh
- Denomination: Catholic Church
- Parents: Francis MacRory and Rose Montague
- Motto: Fortis in Fide

Joseph Cardinal MacRory (Irish: Seosamh Mac Ruairí; 19 March 1861 – 13 October 1945) was an Irish Cardinal of the Roman Catholic Church who served as Archbishop of Armagh from 1928 until his death. He was elevated to the cardinalate in 1929. He is regarded as the leading Catholic churchman in Ireland during the period spanning the 1916 Rising, Partition, and the Second World War.

== Early life and education ==
Joseph MacRory was born on 19 March 1861 in Ballygawley, County Tyrone, one of ten children of Francis MacRory, a farmer, and his second wife, Rose (née Montague) MacRory. His younger sister Margaret MacRory became a leading nun in Australia. He studied at St. Patrick's College, Armagh and at Maynooth and was ordained to the priesthood on 13 September 1885.

His first appointment was as the first president of St. Patrick's Academy, Dungannon from 1886 to 1887. MacRory went on to teach scripture and modern theology at St Mary's College, Oscott in England until 1889, at which stage he was appointed professor of scripture and Oriental languages at his alma mater of Maynooth College.

He was a founder member of the editorial team behind the creation of the Irish Ecclesiastical Review in 1902 and was appointed vice-president of Maynooth in 1912.

== Bishop of Down and Connor ==
On 9 August 1915, MacRory was appointed Bishop of Down and Connor by Pope Benedict XV and received his episcopal consecration on 14 November from Michael Cardinal Logue. He chose as his episcopal motto Fortis in Fide ("Strong in Faith").

From 1917-18, he was one of the four clerical members of the Irish Convention and said, in a letter to the Rector of the Pontifical Irish College that he was attending in order to oppose partition "with all my heart."

He was one of the delegates who backed the option of full Dominion Status for Ireland.

Sir Horace Plunkett, who chaired the convention, recorded in his diary that, in August 1917, Bishop MacRory made a bad speech "raking up the past."

During The Troubles in Ulster (1920–1922) Bishop MacRory proposed that the overwhelmingly Protestant paramilitary police force the Ulster Special Constabulary be disbanded and a new force established (made up of 50% Catholics).

== Archbishop of Armagh ==
On 22 June 1928, MacRory was promoted to Archbishop of Armagh and thus Primate of All Ireland, in succession to Patrick Cardinal O'Donnell, and the following year, in the consistory of 16 December 1929, Pope Pius XI created him Cardinal-Priest of San Giovanni a Porta Latina.

Cardinal MacRory presided over the 31st International Eucharistic Congress, which was held in Dublin from 20 to 26 June 1932 and which was a highpoint for the Catholic Church in the newly created Irish Free State, which was a dominion within the British Empire. He also exercised occasional additional roles by virtue of being a cardinal; he was, for example, the papal legate at the 1933 laying of the foundation stone of Liverpool Metropolitan Cathedral, in the North of England, and the following year travelled to Australia as legate to the National Eucharistic Congress.

He was one of the cardinal electors who participated in the 1939 papal conclave, which selected Pope Pius XII.

MacRory was a strenuous opponent of the Partition of Ireland. In late 1931, MacRory made the following statement:

"The Protestant Church in Ireland – and the same is true of the Protestant Church anywhere – is not only not the rightful representative of the early Irish Church, but it is not even a part of the Church of Christ. That is my proposition."

== Wartime ==
It was MacRory who suggested to Eoin O'Duffy that he raise an Irish Brigade to aid the Generalissimo Franco's Nationalists, who were seeking to overthrow the democratically elected Spanish government during that country's civil war. Many of the Brigade's members were blessed by the Archbishop of Tuam, Thomas Gilmartin, before sailing to Spain from Galway. In 1940, during World War II, he voiced strong objections to proposals for conscription in Northern Ireland, which, in the event, did not come to pass (see Conscription in the United Kingdom).

== Miscellanea ==
MacRory was a supporter of the Gaelic League, and Errigal Ciaran, one of the most famous GAA clubs in Ireland, plays at Cardinal MacRory Park, Dunmoyle, which was named in his honour in 1956.

== The People's Primate ==
Biographer J.J. Murphy published, in 1945, a 71-page biography of the prelate, The People's Primate. A Memoir of Joseph Cardinal MacRory, (Dublin, 1945).

== Death ==
After a brief illness, Cardinal MacRory died at the age of 84 from a heart attack at Ara Coeli, the archbishop's official residence in Armagh. He was interred in St Patrick's Cathedral Cemetery, Armagh.

Catholic Church titles
Preceded by John Tohill	Bishop of Down and Connor; 1915–1928	Succeeded by Daniel Mageean
Preceded by Patrick O'Donnell	Archbishop of Armagh; Primate of All Ireland; 1928–1945	Succeeded by John D'Alton
