= John D'Alton =

Irish cardinal of the Roman Catholic Church and Archbishop of Armagh

His Eminence John Cardinal D'Alton
- Cardinal, Archbishop of Armagh; Primate of All Ireland
- See: Armagh
- Installed: 1946
- Term ended: 1963
- Predecessor: Joseph MacRory
- Successor: William Conway
- Other post: Bishop of Meath 1943–1946

Orders
- Ordination: 18 April 1908 (Priest)
- Consecration: 29 June 1942 (Bishop)
- Created cardinal: 12 January 1953
- Rank: Cardinal priest of S. Agata dei Goti

Personal details
- Born: John Francis D'Alton; 11 October 1882 Claremorris, County Mayo, Ireland
- Died: 1 February 1963 (aged 80) Dublin, Ireland
- Buried: St Patrick's Cathedral Cemetery, Armagh
- Denomination: Roman Catholic Church
- Parents: Joseph D'Alton and Mary D'Alton (née Brennan)
- Motto: Judicare Sine Ira
- Coat of arms

John Francis Cardinal D'Alton (11 October 1882 – 1 February 1963) was an Irish Cardinal of the Roman Catholic Church who served as Archbishop of Armagh and thus Primate of All Ireland from 1946 until his death. He was elevated to the cardinalate in 1953.

== Early life and education ==
John D'Alton was born in Claremorris, County Mayo, to Joseph D'Alton (d. 1 April 1883) and his wife Mary Brennan, at the height of the Land Wars in Ireland. He was baptised four days later, on 15 October 1882, with Michael and Mary Brennan acting as his godparents. D'Alton's mother had a daughter, Mollie Brennan, from a previous marriage; she remarried again after the Cardinal's father died in 1883.

He obtained an extensive education at Blackrock College, Holy Cross College in Clonliffe, the University College Dublin, Irish College in Rome. He was a contemporary of Éamon de Valera, whom he befriended at Blackrock College. In his first year in Blackrock, de Valera beat D'Alton in two subjects – Maths, which he would later go on to teach, and Religion.

== Priestly ministry ==
D'Alton was ordained to the priesthood on 18 April 1908 for service in the Archdiocese of Dublin. He undertook further postgraduate studies in Rome from 1908 to 1910, gaining a Doctorate of Divinity and was appointed to teach ancient classics, Latin, and Greek at St. Patrick's College in Maynooth.

He occupied important roles at the National Seminary and was successively professor of ancient classics (1912), Greek (1922), vice-president (1934), and president 1936. He was raised to the rank of Monsignor on 27 June 1938.

== Episcopal ministry ==
=== Meath ===
On 25 April 1942, he was appointed Coadjutor bishop of Meath and Titular bishop of Binda. D'Alton received his episcopal consecration on the following 29 June from Cardinal Joseph MacRory, with Bishops Edward Mulhern and William MacNeely serving as co-consecrators, in the chapel of St. Patrick's College. He succeeded Thomas Mulvany as Bishop of Meath on 16 June 1943.

=== Armagh ===
D'Alton was named Archbishop of Armagh and thus Primate of All Ireland on 13 June 1946, and was created Cardinal Priest of S. Agata dei Goti by Pope Pius XII in the consistory of 12 January 1953. A cardinal elector in the 1958 papal conclave. He gave a hint of the difficulties involved in that papal conclave and achieving unanimity in the voting.

He was a member of the Central Preparatory Commission of the Second Vatican Council but lived long enough to attend only the council's first session in 1962.

One highlight of his time in Armagh was the Patrician Year Celebrations in 1961, marked by the Irish Catholic hierarchy as the 1500th anniversary of the death of St. Patrick and as such an opportunity to promote the "spiritual empire" created by the Irish Catholic church in the wider anglophone world. D'Alton wrote a pastoral letter to mark the occasion.

Cardinal D'Alton was seen to be more ecumenical in outlook than other members of the Irish hierarchy. He tried to broker talks between the Irish Free State and the United Kingdom to ease the tensions between both countries, even going so far as to address the situation regarding the Irish ports, but to little avail.

In 1952 he became the first individual from the Republic of Ireland to receive an honorary degree from Queen's University Belfast, when he was conferred with a Doctorate in Literature. He already possessed a doctorate in divinity so this degree was a recognition of his earlier works such as Horace and His Age: A Study in Historical Background (1917), Roman Literary Theory and Criticism: A Study in Tendencies (1931), and Selections from St. John Chrysostom (1940).

He died from a heart attack in Dublin at age 80, and was buried on the grounds of St Patrick's Cathedral. He was succeeded by his auxiliary bishop, William Conway.

In his hometown of Claremorris, the Dalton Inn Hotel and Dalton Street (formerly Church Street) are named after him. A plaque commemorating him was unveiled at the Dalton Inn Hotel on 28 September 2023.

Catholic Church titles
Preceded by Thomas Mulvany	Bishop of Meath; 1943–1946	Succeeded by John Anthony Kyne
Preceded by Joseph MacRory	Archbishop of Armagh; Primate of All Ireland; 1946–1963	Succeeded by William Conway
