= Michael Kieran =

Irish prelate

The Most Reverend Michael Kieran DD
- Archbishop of Armagh; Primate of All Ireland
- Archdiocese: Armagh
- Installed: 1867
- Term ended: 1869 (died)
- Predecessor: Joseph Dixon
- Successor: Daniel McGettigan

Orders
- Ordination: 1832 (Priest)
- Consecration: 3 Feb 1867 (Bishop)

Personal details
- Born: 12 06 1803 Cuillenstown, Louth
- Died: 15 Sept 1869 Forthill House, Dundalk, County Louth
- Denomination: Roman Catholic Church

Styles of Michael Kieran
- Reference style: The Most Reverend
- Spoken style: Your Grace or Archbishop

Michael Kieran (died 1869) was an Irish prelate of the Roman Catholic Church. He served as the Archbishop of Armagh and Primate of All Ireland from 1866 to 1869.

== Biography ==
Kieran was Parish Priest of Dundalk (1848–1869) and Dean of the Archdiocese of Armagh (1857–1866). Following the death of Archbishop Joseph Dixon of Armagh, Kieran was Vicar Capitular of Armagh until elected archbishop by the Propaganda Fide on 30 July 1866. The election was approved by Pope Pius IX on 30 September, and decreed on 6 November 1866. He was consecrated at St. Patrick's Church, Dundalk by Cardinal Paul Cullen, Archbishop of Dublin on 3 February 1867. As archbishop, Kieran made Dundalk his mensal parish.

He died at his residence, Forthill, Dundalk, on 15 September 1869. His remains are interred in front of Our Lady's altar in St. Patrick's Church, Dundalk.

== Bibliography ==
- Brady, W. Maziere (1876). The Episcopal Succession in England, Scotland and Ireland, A.D. 1400 to 1875. Rome. Volume 1: Tipografia Della Pace.
- Fryde, E. B.; Greenway, D. E.; Porter, S.; Roy, I., eds. (1986). Handbook of British Chronology (3rd, reprinted 2003 ed.). Cambridge: Cambridge University Press. ISBN 0-521-56350-X.

Catholic Church titles
Preceded by Joseph Dixon	Archbishop of Armagh and Primate of All Ireland; 1866–1869	Succeeded by Daniel McGettigan
