= Patrick O'Donnell (cardinal) =

Catholic Archbishop of Armagh

His Eminence Patrick O'Donnell
- Cardinal, Archbishop of Armagh; Primate of All Ireland
- Church: Catholic Church
- Archdiocese: Armagh
- Installed: 1924
- Term ended: 1927
- Predecessor: Michael Logue
- Successor: Joseph MacRory
- Previous posts: Coadjutor Archbishop of Armagh (1922-24); Bishop of Raphoe (1888-1922)

Orders
- Ordination: 1880
- Consecration: 25 March 1888 by Michael Logue
- Created cardinal: 14 December 1925 by Pius XI
- Rank: Cardinal priest

Personal details
- Born: 28 November 1856 Kilraine, Glenties, County Donegal, Ireland
- Died: 22 October 1927 (aged 70) Carlingford, County Louth, Ireland
- Buried: St Patrick's Cathedral Cemetery, Armagh
- Denomination: Catholic
- Education: Maynooth College; Catholic University of Ireland
- Coat of arms

Patrick Joseph O'Donnell (28 November 1856 – October 22, 1927) Irish Catholic prelate who served as Archbishop of Armagh from 1924 until his death in 1927. He was made a cardinal in 1925.

== Early life ==
Patrick Joseph O'Donnell was born in Glenties, County Donegal on 28 November 1855, a son of Daniel O'Donnell, a farmer, and his wife, Mary (née Breslin). He was one of nine children in a family that claimed descent from the O'Donnells of Tyrconnell.

O'Donnell was ordained a priest on 29 June 1880. He attended Secondary School in Letterkenny, and later studied at the Catholic University of Dublin (1873–75) and at Maynooth. He was ordained to the priesthood on 29 June 1880. In that same year, he was appointed to the staff of St Patrick's College, Maynooth, holding the chairs of Dogmatic and Moral Theology. In 1884, he became dean of the revived post-graduate Dunboyne Institute and in 1885 was awarded a Doctor of Sacred Theology. From his desk in Maynooth, he poured out a continuous stream of articles on moral theology and canon law.

== Church leadership ==
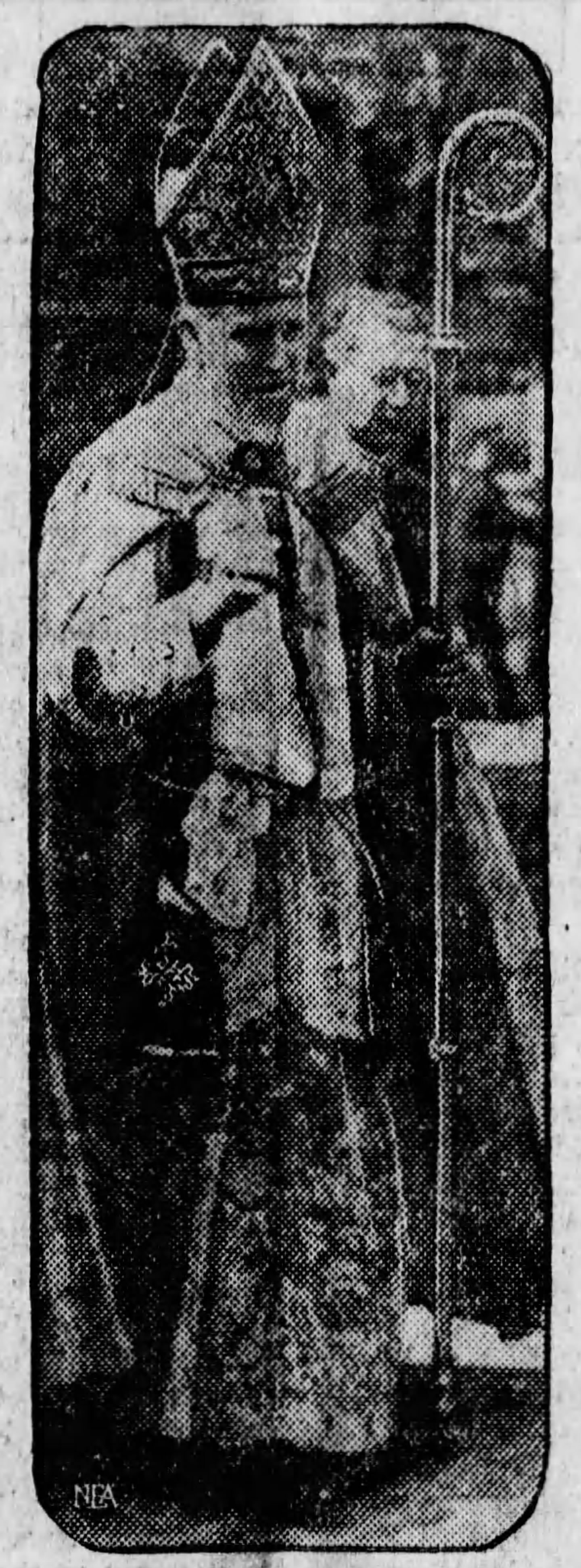
O'Donnell wearing formal robes in 1926 while attending the 28th International Eucharistic Congress in Chicago, United States

He was appointed Bishop of Raphoe on 26 February 1888, making him the youngest bishop in the world at the time and was consecrated by Michael Logue on 3 April 1888 in Letterkenny.

O'Donnell completed a building project in his diocese, the neo-Gothic style building with Romanesque details included Cathedral of St Eunan and St Columba, he also oversaw the building of a house for the bishop and clergy(1891–1901); St Eunan's Diocesan College (1906); the Presentation Monastery and Loreto schools and an extension to Loreto Convent, all in Letterkenny.

He was appointed coadjutor Archbishop of Armagh on 14 January 1922 and succeeded Cardinal Michael Logue on 19 November 1924. On 14 December 1925, Pope Pius XI made O'Donnell a Cardinal.

== Final years ==
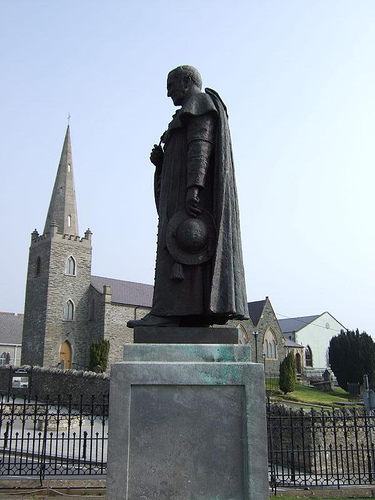
A statue outside of St. Eunan's Cathedral, Letterkenny, in memory of the Cardinal

Cardinal O'Donnell died on 22 October 1927 in Carlingford, County Louth.

== Legacy ==
St Connell's Museum in his home town of Glenties has a display about his life.

O'Donnell Park, a Gaelic games venue in Letterkenny, is named in his honour.

== Sources ==
- Seventy Years Young, Memoires of Elizabeth, Countess of Fingall, by Elizabeth Burke Plunkett, Lady Fingall. First published by Collins of London in 1937; 1991 edition published by The Lilliput Press, Dublin 7, Ireland ISBN 0 946640 74 2.

Catholic Church titles
Preceded by Michael Logue	Bishop of Raphoe; 1888–1922	Succeeded by William MacNeely
Preceded by Michael Logue	Archbishop of Armagh and Primate of All Ireland; 1924–1927	Succeeded by Joseph MacRory
Preceded by Michael Logue	Cardinal-Priest of Santa Maria della Pace; 1925–1927	Succeeded by August Hlond
