= Joseph Dixon (bishop) =

Irish bishop

The Most Reverend Joseph Dixon
- Archbishop of Armagh
- Church: Catholic
- See: Archdiocese of Armagh
- In office: 1852 – 1866 (died)
- Predecessor: Paul Cullen
- Successor: Michael Kieran
- Previous post: Senior Dean St Patrick's College Maynooth

Orders
- Ordination: 1829
- Consecration: 21 Nov 1852 by Paul Cullen
- Rank: Archbishop of Dublin

Personal details
- Born: 1806 Coalisland County Tyrone, Ireland
- Died: 29 April 1866 (aged 59–60) Armagh

Styles of Joseph Dixon
- Reference style: The Most Reverend
- Spoken style: Your Grace or Archbishop

Joseph Dixon 1806 – 1866 was an Irish Roman Catholic Archbishop of Armagh and Primate of All-Ireland.

== Early life and education ==
Dixon was born in Coalisland, County Tyrone in 1806 and entered Maynooth College at the age of sixteen. He was ordained priest in 1829. He was initially appointed as Junior Dean of the college, rising to Senior Dean in 1833. In 1834 he was appointed to the chair of Sacred Scripture and Hebrew, a post he occupied for the next eighteen years. His class had an average of 200 students, amongst whom was John McEvilly, afterwards Archbishop of Tuam.

== Archbishop of Armagh ==
As Primate of Armagh he held an important synod in 1854, at which all the bishops of the northern province assisted with their theologians. In the same year he began completing the unfinished cathedral of Armagh and almost accomplished the work before his death. In 1856 he formed the diocesan chapter consisting of thirteen members.

During his incumbency he brought some religious congregations into the diocese, viz. the Sisters of Charity of St. Vincent de Paul (1855), who opened a house in Drogheda; the Marist Fathers (1851) who opened a college and novitiate in Dundalk, and the Vincentian Fathers who were placed in charge of the ecclesiastical seminary the same year. The primate was a defender of the Holy See and at a public meeting in Drogheda denounced Napoleon III for complicity in the acts of the Italian revolutionists. His speech and subsequent letter to the Freeman's Journal created a sensation and the emperor made them a subject of complaint to Pope Pius IX. Dixon was the organizer of the Irish Brigade in the papal service.

== Works ==
Dixon's professorship was signalized by his "Introduction to the Sacred Scriptures", a work praised by Cardinal Wiseman. The first edition appeared in 1852 and a second in 1875.

Catholic Church titles
Preceded by Paul Cullen	Archbishop of Armagh and Primate of All Ireland; 1852–1866	Succeeded by Michael Kieran
