= Michael Logue =

Catholic Archbishop of Armagh

His Eminence Michael Cardinal Logue
- Cardinal, Archbishop of Armagh; Primate of All Ireland
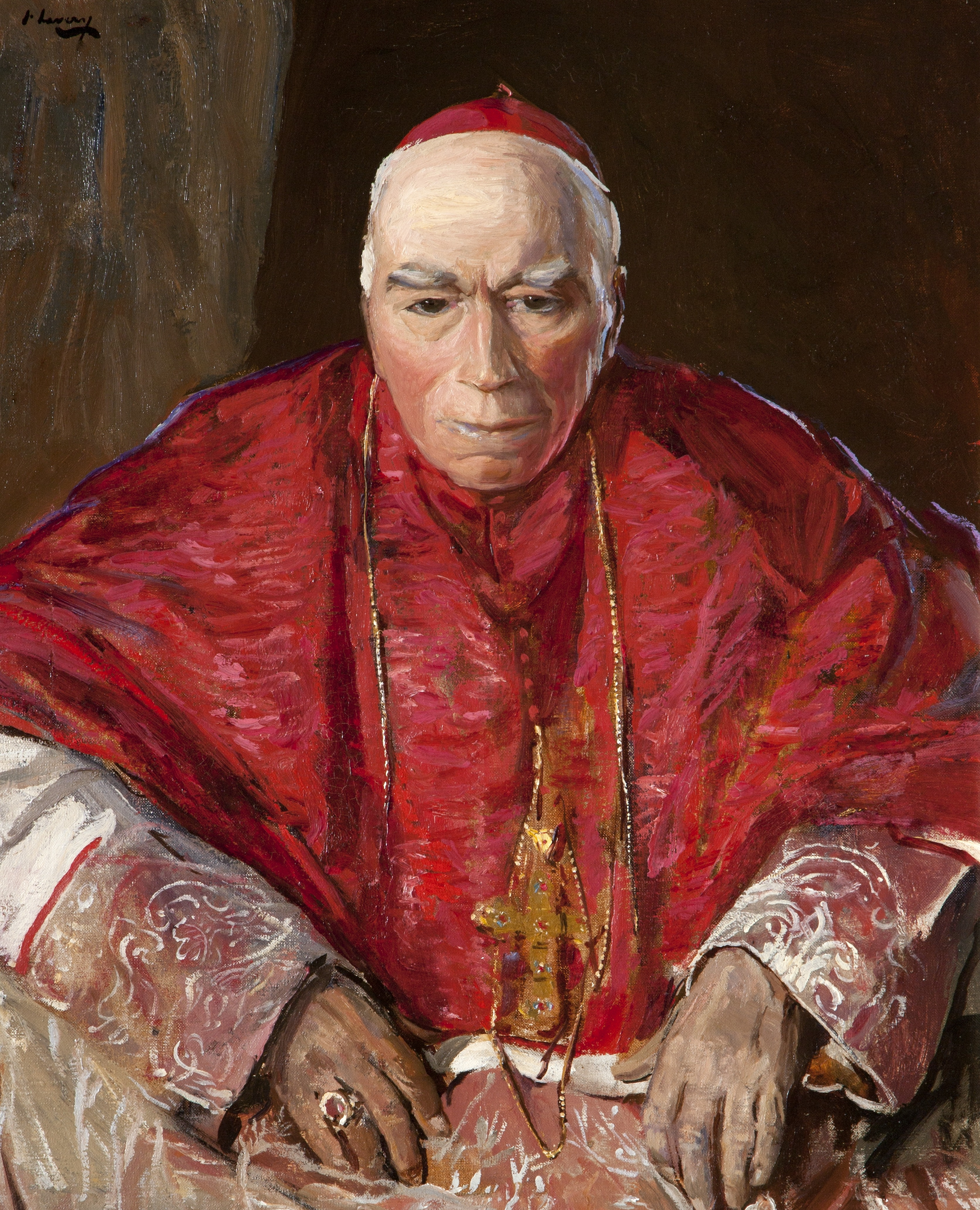
- Portrait by John Lavery, 1920
- See: Armagh
- Installed: 3 December 1887
- Term ended: 19 November 1924
- Predecessor: Daniel McGettigan
- Successor: Patrick O'Donnell
- Other posts: Bishop of Raphoe (1879–87); Coadjutor Archbishop of Armagh (1887)

Orders
- Ordination: December 1866 (Priest)
- Consecration: 20 July 1879 (Bishop) by Daniel McGettigan
- Created cardinal: 16 January 1893 by Leo XIII
- Rank: Cardinal-priest

Personal details
- Born: 1 October 1840 Kilmacrennan, County Donegal, Ireland
- Died: 19 November 1924 (aged 84) Armagh, County Armagh, Northern Ireland
- Buried: St Patrick's Cathedral Cemetery, Armagh
- Denomination: Catholic Church
- Motto: In Patientia Salus

Michael Cardinal Logue (1 October 1840 – 19 November 1924) was an Irish prelate of the Catholic Church. He served as Archbishop of Armagh and Primate of All Ireland from 1887 until his death in 1924. He was appointed a cardinal in 1893.

== Early life and education ==
Cardinal Logue was born at his mother's paternal home, Duringings, in Kilmacrenan, a small town in the north of County Donegal in the north-west of Ulster, the northern province in Ireland. He was the son of Michael Logue, a blacksmith, and Catherine Durning. From 1857 to 1866, he studied at Maynooth College, where his intelligence earned him the nickname "the Northern Star." Before his ordination to the priesthood, he was assigned by the Irish bishops as the chair of both theology and belles lettres at the Irish College in Paris in 1866. He was ordained as a priest in December of that year.

Logue remained on the faculty of the Irish College until 1874, when he returned to County Donegal as administrator of a parish in Letterkenny. In 1876, he joined the staff of Maynooth College as professor of Dogmatic theology and Irish, as well as the post of dean.

== Bishop of Raphoe ==
On 13 May 1879, Logue was appointed Bishop of Raphoe by Pope Leo XIII. He received his episcopal consecration on the following 20 July from Archbishop Daniel McGettigan, with Bishops James Donnelly and Francis Kelly serving as co-consecrators, at the pro-cathedral of Raphoe. He was involved in fundraising to help people during the 1879 Irish famine, which, due to major donations of food and government intervention never developed into a major famine. He took advantage of the Intermediate Act of 1878 to enlarge the Catholic high school in Letterkenny. He was also heavily involved in the Irish temperance movement to discourage the consumption of alcohol.

== Archbishop of Armagh ==
On 18 April 1887, Logue was appointed Coadjutor Archbishop of Armagh and Titular Archbishop of Anazarbus. Upon the death of Archbishop MacGettigan, Logue succeeded him as Archbishop of Armagh, and thus Primate of All Ireland, on 3 December of that year. He was created Cardinal-Priest of S. Maria della Pace by Pope Leo XIII in the consistory of 19 January 1893.

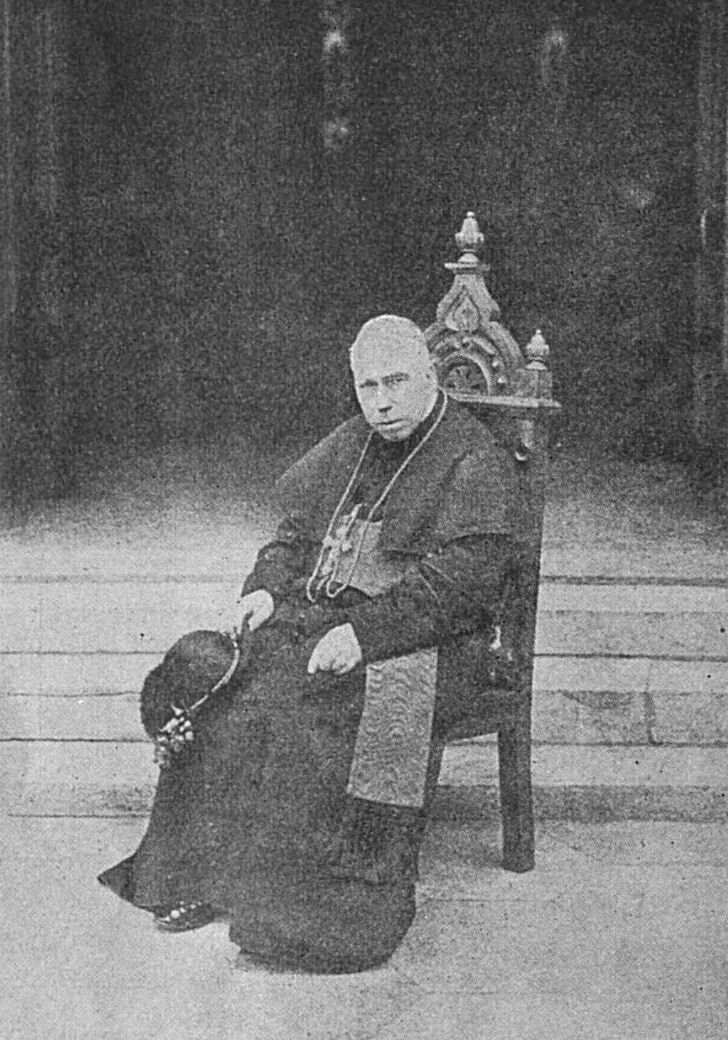
Michael Cardinal Logue, Archbishop of Armagh

He thus became the first archbishop of Armagh to be elevated to the College of Cardinals. He participated in the 1903, 1914, and 1922 conclaves that elected popes Pius X, Benedict XV, and Pius XI respectively. Logue took over the completion of the Victorian gothic St. Patrick's Cathedral in Armagh. The new cathedral, which towered over Armagh, was dedicated on 24 July 1904.

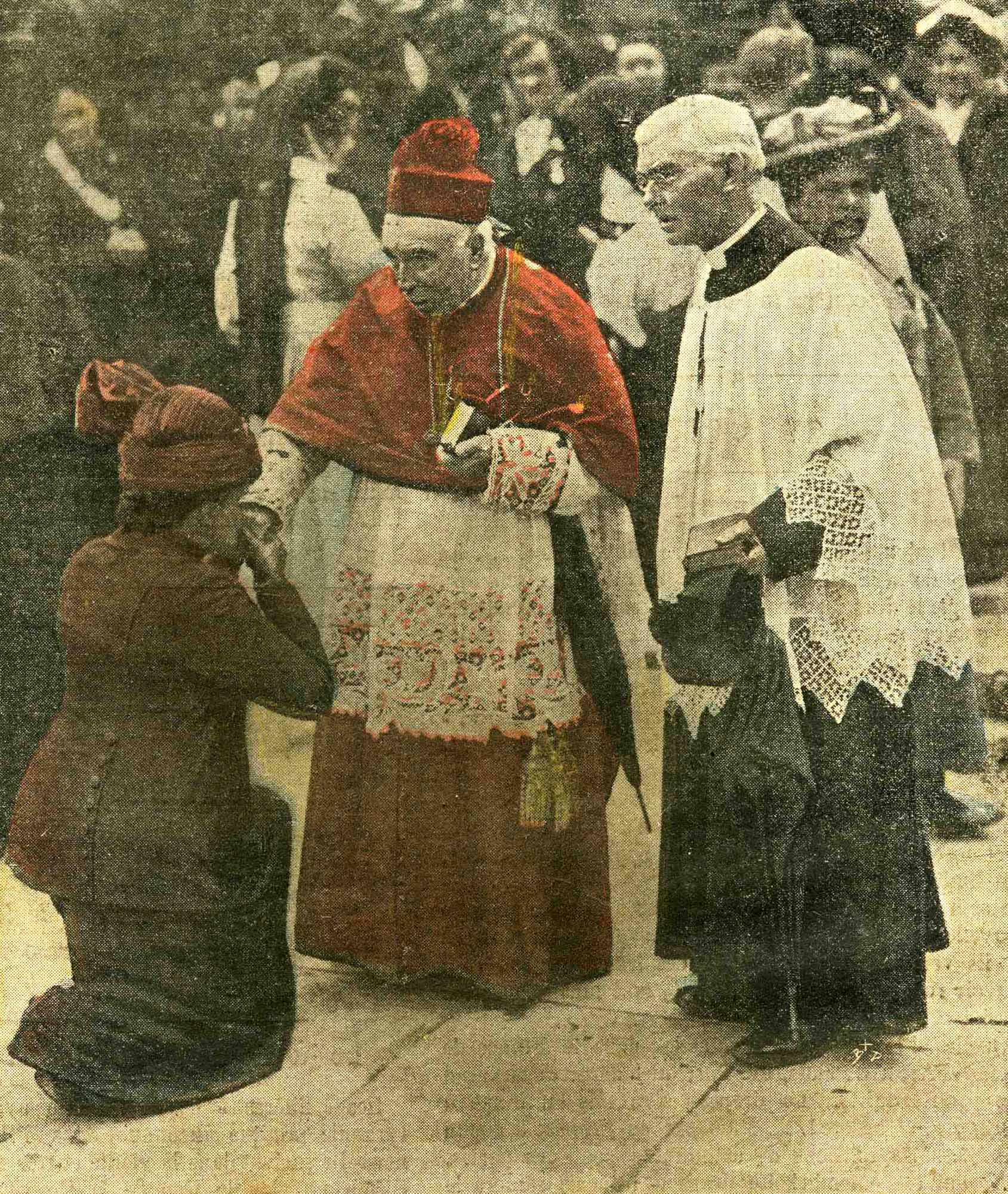
Cardinal Logue in Lourdes, 1913

Cardinal Logue publicly supported the principle of Irish Home Rule throughout his long reign in both Raphoe and Armagh, though he was often wary of the motives of individual politicians articulating that political position. He maintained a loyal attitude to the British Crown during the First World War, and on 19 June 1917, when numbers of the younger clergy were beginning to take part in the Sinn Féin agitation, he issued an "instruction" calling attention to the teaching of the Roman Catholic Church as to the obedience due to legitimate authority, warning the clergy against belonging to "dangerous associations," and reminding priests that it was strictly forbidden by the statutes of the National Synod to speak of political or kindred affairs in the church.

In 1918, however, he placed himself at the head of the opposition to the extension of the Military Service Act of 1916 to Ireland, in the midst of the Conscription Crisis of 1918. Bishops assessed that priests were permitted to denounce conscription on the grounds that the question was not political but moral. Logue also involved himself in politics for the 1918 general election, when he arranged an electoral pact between the Irish Parliamentary Party and Sinn Féin in three constituencies in Ulster, and chose a Sinn Féin candidate in South Fermanagh – the imprisoned Republican, John O'Mahoney.

He opposed the campaign of murder against the police and military begun in 1919, and in his Lenten pastoral of 1921, he vigorously denounced murder by whomsoever committed. This was accompanied by an almost equally vigorous attack on the methods and policy of the government. He endorsed the Anglo-Irish Treaty in 1921.

In 1921, the death of James Cardinal Gibbons made Logue archpriest (protoprete) of the College of Cardinals. Logue was more politically conservative than Archbishop William Joseph Walsh, which created tension between Armagh and Dublin. In earlier life he was a keen student of nature and an excellent yachtsman.

He died in Ara Coeli, the official residence of the Archbishop of Armagh, on 19 November 1924 and was buried in a cemetery in the grounds of his cathedral.

Catholic Church titles
Preceded by James MacDevitt	Bishop of Raphoe; 1879–1887	Succeeded by Patrick O'Donnell
Preceded by François Laurencin	Titular Archbishop of Anazarbus; 1887	Succeeded by Joaquín Larraín Gandarillas
Preceded by Daniel McGettigan	Archbishop of Armagh and Primate of All Ireland; 1887–1924	Succeeded by Patrick O'Donnell
Preceded by Domenico Agostini	Cardinal-Priest of Santa Maria della Pace; 1893–1924	Succeeded by Patrick O'Donnell
