= Conwal =

Conwal may refer to:

- Conwal and Leck, Catholic parish found in the Diocese of Raphoe, Ireland
- Conwal Cemetery
- Conwal Parish Church (Church of Ireland)
- Saint Conval, Irish-born missionary
