= Anthony McFeely =

Irish prelate

Anthony Columba McFeely
- Bishop of Raphoe
- Church: Catholic Church
- Diocese: Diocese of Raphoe
- In office: 14 May 1965 – 12 February 1982
- Predecessor: William MacNeely
- Successor: Séamus Hegarty

Orders
- Ordination: 10 July 1932
- Consecration: 27 June 1965 by William Conway

Personal details
- Born: 4 February 1909 Ballybofey, County Donegal, United Kingdom of Great Britain and Ireland
- Died: 7 October 1986 (aged 77)

Anthony Columba McFeely (4 February 1909 – 7 October 1986) was an Irish prelate of the Roman Catholic Church.

McFeely was born in Ballybofey and educated at St Columb's College, Derry. He followed his paternal uncle Fr William Boyle McFeely into the priesthood and studied for the priesthood at St Patrick's College, Maynooth and the Pontifical Irish College, Rome and was ordained a priest for service in the Diocese of Derry.

From 1950 to 1959 he was President of St Columb's and parish priest of Strabane from then until his appointment to the episcopate, as Bishop of Raphoe . He was ordained a bishop in St Eunan's Cathedral, Letterkenny on 27th June 1965.

== Bishop of Raphoe ==
McFeely became a bishop as the Second Vatican Council closed and so he put into effect the liturgical and other conciliar reforms in his diocese. He also "put diocesan finances on a sound basis, replacing funeral offerings with the envelope system, and he took in hand the creation of a diocesan archive". In constructing several new churches in his diocese McFeely often commissioned internationally acclaimed architect Liam McCormick especially at Milford, Burt and Creeslough.

In the early 1970s he persuaded the Capuchin Order not to leave Ards Friary, adjacent to Ards Forest Park but to re-purpose their previous novitiate into a pastoral centre and make more use of the extensive grounds.

In 2011 it was revealed that Bishop McFeely had allowed a notorious paedophile priest - Father Patrick Maguire - to get away with abusing a young boy – before finally taking action against him.

Catholic Church titles
Preceded by William MacNeely	Bishop of Raphoe; 1965–1982	Succeeded by Séamus Hegarty
