= Eóin Ó Cuileannáin =

Roman Catholic bishop of Raphoe

Styles of Eóin Ó Cuileannáin, S.T.D.
- Reference style: The Most Reverend
- Spoken style: My Lord
- Religious style: Bishop

Eóin Ó Cuileannáin, S.T.D. (anglicised John O'Cullenan; c. 1583–1661) was an Irish Roman Catholic prelate who served as the Bishop of Raphoe from 1625 to 1661.

Ó Cuileannáin was appointed Vicar Apostolic of the Roman Catholic Diocese of Raphoe by papal brief on 1 December [O.S. 21 November] 1621. Four years later, he was appointed Bishop of Raphoe on 9 June [O.S. 30 May] 1625, but was not consecrated until 1629. After having been held in prison in Derry for several years, Bishop Ó Cuileannáin went into exile in March 1653.

Eóin Ó Cuileannáin died in Brussels on 24 March 1661, aged about 78, and was interred in the chapel of the Virgin in the Cathedral of St. Michael and St. Gudula.
