= Philip Boyce (bishop) =

Irish bishop (born 1940)

The Most Reverend Bishop Philip Boyce OCD
- Bishop Emeritus of Raphoe
- Church: Catholic Church
- See: Raphoe
- Installed: 1 October 1995
- Term ended: 9 June 2017
- Predecessor: Séamus Hegarty
- Successor: Alan McGuckian

Personal details
- Born: 25 January 1940 (age 86) Derry, Northern Ireland
- Education: Derryhassen School, Castlemartyr College
- Coat of arms

Philip Boyce, OCD (born 25 January 1940), was Bishop of Raphoe from 1 October 1995 until 2017.

== Early life ==
Boyce was born in Derry, Northern Ireland, and grew up in Downings, a village on the Rosguill Peninsula in the north of County Donegal. He was educated at Derryhassen School in Meevagh Parish and at Castlemartyr College in Castlemartyr, County Cork. He joined the noviciate of the Discalced Carmelites in Loughrea, County Galway, making his first profession in 1959. Having completed philosophical studies in Dublin, he studied theology at the Teresianum in Rome; he was ordained priest on 17 April 1966. He received a doctorate in theology (D.D.) in 1977 with a dissertation on the spirituality of John Henry Cardinal Newman.

During his twenty years on the teaching staff of the Pontifical Theological Faculty of the Carmelites in Rome, Boyce taught spirituality and dogmatic theology, and for many years was engaged in the work of formation of students preparing for the priesthood or doing postgraduate studies.

== Bishop of Raphoe ==
Boyce was appointed Bishop of Raphoe on 29 June 1995, and consecrated on 1 October 1995. The principal consecrator was Jorge María Cardinal Mejía. Both Emanuele Gerada, Titular Archbishop of Nomentum, the apostolic nuncio to Ireland at the time, and Séamus Hegarty, Bishop of Derry (and formerly Bishop of Raphoe), served as principal co-consecrators.

In May 1999, Pope John Paul II appointed Boyce a member of the Congregation for Divine Worship and the Discipline of the Sacraments. As part of his work on the congregation, Boyce was also a member of the Vox Clara commission which, since its establishment by the Congregation on 19 July 2001, provided advice to the Holy See concerning English-language translations of liturgical books.

In August 2011, after the release of the report on the sexual abuse scandal in Cloyne diocese, Bishop Boyce said that the Church was experiencing a testing time, having been rocked by a "secular and godless culture" on the outside and the "sins and crimes of priests" within. Boyce, who promised to publish a report into clerical abuse in his diocese, urged Catholics not to lose confidence in their faith and to act with hope and patience during the current difficult times for the church. He added that "The moment of history we live through in Ireland at present is certainly a testing one for the church and for all of us", he said. "Attacked from the outside by the arrows of a secular and godless culture, rocked from the inside by the sins and crimes of priests and consecrated people, we all feel the temptation to lose confidence."

On 25 January 2015, Bishop Boyce reached the mandatory age of retirement for a bishop which is 75 years. In a statement released by the Raphoe Diocese, Bishop Boyce duly submitted his resignation to Pope Francis. The Pope accepted his resignation, but asked him to continue until the current bishop, Alan McGuckian, was appointed.

== Child protection ==
A review, published on 30 November 2011, by the National Board for Safeguarding Children into the handling of clerical child sex abuse allegations in the Diocese of Raphoe concluded that "significant errors of judgment" were made by successive bishops in responding to the allegations. Boyce said he fully accepted the recommendations contained in the review, which was undertaken by the National Board for Safeguarding Children in the Catholic Church. In a statement, he admitted that during the past decades there had been "very poor judgments and mistakes made ... There were horrific acts of abuse of children by individual priests, that should never have happened, and if suspected should have been dealt with immediately in the appropriate manner," he said.

Boyce said he was "truly sorry for the terrible deeds that have been inflicted on so many by a small minority of priests. "We offer our humble apologies once more and seek their forgiveness for the dreadful harm that has been done to them, their families and friends."

Three heads of Raphoe diocese, including Boyce, were criticised for their handling of clerical child sex abuse allegations in the report on child protection practices, which was published this morning. Former Bishop Séamus Hegarty, and his predecessor, Bishop Anthony McFeely, also came under fire for their response to accusations of clerical child sex abuse. The Raphoe review said that in dealing with allegations, too much emphasis was placed on the situation of the accused priest and too little on the needs of their complainants. "Judgements were clouded, due to the presenting problem being for example, alcohol abuse and an inability to hear the concerns about abuse of children, through that presenting problem," it said. "More attention should have been given to ensuring that preventative actions were taken quickly when concerns came to light," the report added.

== Apostolic Administrator in Dromore Diocese ==
On 26 March 2018, Pope Francis appointed Bishop Philip Boyce as Apostolic Administrator for the Diocese of Dromore, after the resignation of Bishop John McAreavey in the wake of controversy over the latter's dealings with the paedophile priest Malachy Finegan. On 15 April 2019, Pope Francis appointed Eamon Martin, Primate of All Ireland and Archbishop of Armagh, as Apostolic Administrator of Dromore, replacing Bishop Boyce.

== See also ==
- Sexual abuse scandal in Raphoe diocese

Religious titles
Preceded by Dr. Séamus Hegarty	Bishop of Raphoe; 29 June 1995 – 9 June 2017	Succeeded by Alan McGuckian
