= Niall Coll =

Irish Catholic bishop (born 1963)

The Most Reverend Dr. Niall Coll
- Bishop of Raphoe
- Church: Roman Catholic
- Diocese: Raphoe
- Appointed: 13 November 2025
- Installed: 25 January 2026
- Predecessor: Alan McGuckian
- Previous posts: Professor of Religious Studies and Religious Education at St Mary's University College; Chaplain and Teacher at Pobalscoil na Rosann; Lecturer at St Patrick's, Carlow College; Teacher at St Eunan's College

Orders
- Ordination: 3 July 1988 by Séamus Hegarty
- Consecration: 25 January 2026 by Eamon Martin

Personal details
- Born: 25 August 1963 (age 63) Letterkenny, County Donegal, Ireland
- Education: Pontifical Gregorian University; Trinity College Dublin; St Patrick's College, Maynooth
- Coat of arms

Styles of Niall Coll
- Reference style: The Most Reverend
- Spoken style: Your Lordship
- Religious style: Bishop

Ordination history of Niall Coll
History
Priestly ordination
- Ordained by: Séamus Hegarty
Episcopal consecration
- Principal consecrator: Dermot Farrell
- Co-consecrators: Alan McGuckian; Denis Nulty

The Most Rev. Dr. Niall Coll, KC*HS (born 25 August 1963), is an Irish Catholic prelate and theologian who served as Bishop of Ossory from 22 January 2023 to 25 January 2026. On 13 November 2025, he was appointed as Bishop of Raphoe by Pope Leo XIV and installed on 25 January 2026.

== Early life and education ==
Coll was born in Letterkenny, County Donegal, on 25 August 1963, one of four children to Willie and Kathleen Coll. He grew up in nearby St Johnston and attended secondary school at St Eunan's College.

Coll began studying for the priesthood at St Patrick's College, Maynooth, in 1981, completing a Bachelor of Arts in history and geography from the National University of Ireland, Maynooth, in 1984, and a Bachelor of Divinity from the Pontifical University in 1987.

He was ordained a priest for the Diocese of Raphoe on 3 July 1988.

== Presbyteral ministry ==
Following ordination, Coll completed a licentiate in dogmatic theology from the Pontifical Gregorian University in Rome in 1989, before returning to Ireland for his first diocesan assignment, as a teacher at St Eunan's College until 1991. He subsequently obtained a higher diploma in education from Trinity College, Dublin, in 1992, before returning to Rome to complete doctoral studies in Christology at the Pontifical Gregorian University.

Coll returned to Ireland once again in 1995, upon his appointment as a lecturer at St Patrick's, Carlow College. He returned to the Diocese of Raphoe in 1998, serving as curate in Dungloe and simultaneously as chaplain and teacher at Pobalscoil na Rosann.

In 2001, Coll was appointed professor in religious studies and religious education at St Mary's University College in Belfast. He returned to the Diocese of Raphoe once again in 2020, when he was appointed as parish priest of Drumholm (centred on Ballintra), before being appointed parish priest of Tawnawilly (centred on Donegal Town) the following year. Coll also served on the diocesan pastoral council and coordinated the promotion of the diocesan pastoral plan upon its publication in April 2022.

In an interview with The Irish Catholic in 2018, he emphasised the importance of intelligence and reason in faith development.

In conjunction with his priestly appointments, Coll has conducted retreats for clergy, contributed to publications including Doctrine and Life, The Furrow, Irish Theological Quarterly and The Tablet, and edited the Catholic school ethos journal Le Chéile. He has also edited a collection of essays evaluating Ireland's response to the Second Vatican Council.

On a national level, Coll has also served as a member of the Inter-Church Committee of the Irish Council of Churches.

== Episcopal ministry ==
Coll was appointed Bishop-elect of Ossory by Pope Francis on 28 October 2022.

He was consecrated by his predecessor, The Most Rev. Dermot Farrell, Archbishop of Dublin, on 22 January 2023 in St Mary's Cathedral, Kilkenny. Bishop Coll was appointed as Bishop-elect of Raphoe on 13 November 2025 by Pope Leo XIV.

His installation as Bishop of Raphoe took place on 25 January 2026 in the Cathedral of St Eunan and St Columba in Letterkenny.

== Bibliography ==
- Coll, Niall (1995). Some Anglican interpretations of Christ's pre-existence: a study of L. S. Thornton, E. L. Mascall, J. A. T. Robinson and J. Macquarrie. Rome. OCLC 312567965.
- Coll, Niall (2001). A Church with a Future: Challenges to Irish Catholicism Today. Dublin: Four Courts Press. ISBN 9781856074889.
- Coll, Niall (2005). Christ in Eternity and Time: Modern Anglican Perspective. Dublin: Columba Books. ISBN 9781851825998.
- Coll, Niall, ed. (2015). Ireland and Vatican II: Essays Theological, Pastoral and Educational. Dublin: Columba Press. ISBN 9781782182764.

Catholic Church titles
Preceded by Alan McGuckian	Bishop of Raphoe since 2026	Incumbent
