= Sexual abuse scandal in the Roman Catholic Diocese of Raphoe =

Sexual abuse cases in Ireland

This article summarises convictions and allegations of child sexual abuse by clergymen in the Raphoe Diocese, Ireland.

== Developments ==
In 1999, Fr. Eugene Greene, a priest who served in the Diocese of Raphoe, was arrested after being charged with committing numerous acts of sex abuse between the years 1965 and 1992. In 2000, Greene was sentenced to 12 years in jail after being accused of abusing up to 26 boys. Greene, who had pleaded guilty to 40 out of 115 charges, was released from prison in 2008 after serving nine years of his sentence.

A 2008 book alleged that Greene's criminality was known to clergy in Raphoe "at least as early as 1976".

The former Bishop of Derry, Dr. Séamus Hegarty served as Bishop of the Diocese of Raphoe from 1982 to 1994 during the period when some of this abuse occurred but in an RTÉ Raidió na Gaeltachta interview in 2002, Hegarty said he never knew of Greene's crimes when he was bishop, and his successor as Bishop of Raphoe, Dr. Philip Boyce, stated that he was not made aware of child sexual abuse allegations against Fr. Greene in 1995.

In 2006, the Diocese of Raphoe adopted a policy to prevent further cases of child abuse. The report, entitled Child Protection in the Diocese of Raphoe, sought to build greater public awareness to break the social taboo about investigating allegations of clerical pederasty.

Boyce said he would welcome an audit or any intervention which would help ensure the safety of children. This proposal was first put forward by retired Garda Martin Ridge, who investigated the child abuse carried out by Eugene Greene.

On 11 August 2011 Bishop Boyce complained about a media article that claimed that "hundreds and hundreds" of children had been abused over 40 years by 20 priests in the diocese.

On 30 November 2011 the National Board for Safeguarding Children in the Catholic Church published its review of Raphoe having examined all case files from 1975 to 2010 to determine how allegations and concerns were dealt with. The purpose of the review was also to interview key persons involved in child safeguarding, judge how cases were currently assessed, how the statutory authorities are notified and determine if there are any current risks to children. The review found that "significant errors of judgment" were made by successive bishops.

52 allegations of abuse were reported to the Garda Síochana and the HSE against 14 priests incardinationed into the Diocese during the period 1 January to August 2010. Eight of those priests against whom an allegation was made were judged to be "out of Ministry" or have left the priesthood. As of November 2011, a total of four priests from the diocese have been convicted of having committed an offence or offences since 1 January of that year. The review concluded that the diocese had, at that time, a robust safeguarding policy and procedure in place for safeguarding children; that files were kept in a satisfactory and orderly fashion; and further, that there was a prompt referral system to the state authorities with good co-operation with the Garda Síochána and the Health Service Executive (HSE).

The review was described as a whitewash by the local Tirconaill Tribune newspaper, which criticised the review for not having spoken with the abused.

== See also ==
- Religious abuse
- Sexual misconduct
- Spiritual abuse
