= Art O'Gallagher =

Christian Bishop of Raphoe (1547–1558)

Art MacPhelim O'Gallagher was Bishop of Raphoe from his appointment by the papacy in 1547 until the death of Queen Mary I in 1558. He died at Cenmaghair on 13 August 1561 and was greatly lamented in Tirconnell.
