= Charles Gerald McNamara =

- Born: 11 December 1900; Dublin
- Died: December 7, 1965 (aged 64); Dublin
- Other names: Charles G. McNamara
- Occupation: engineer

Charles Gerald McNamara (11 December 1900 - 7 December 1965) was an Irish engineer active throughout mid-twentieth-century Ireland. He was the eldest son of T.F. McNamara.

== Life ==
Educated at the Catholic University School and Belvedere College, Dublin, he began his career with his younger brother N.P. McNamara at his father's practice from 1915 to 1919, and were partners in his firm in the 1920s. He earned a bachelor's degree in engineering from University College, Dublin in 1922; thereafter working in the Office of Public Works. He was a founding member of the Association of Consulting Engineers. McNamara was invited to the Director of Public Works in Ceylon in 1929 and went on to be appointed Chairman of the Colombo Port Commission. He was awarded his Master of Engineering in 1942.

In 1936, he returned to Ireland and established his own practice. During World War II, he was in charge of Civil Defense in the Dublin area. Later, he incorporated his father's practice into his own following T.F. McNamara's death in 1947, creating the firm of C.G. McNamara & Partners with N.R. MacGovern as a new partner in the architectural division. The 1958 Corporation Flats at Hogan Place, Dublin are attributed to him.

McNamara died suddenly at his home in Dun Laoghaire, on 7 December 1965. With his wife, Eileen, he had two sons and two daughters.
