= Roman Catholic Diocese of Raphoe =

Catholic diocese in Ireland

Diocese of Raphoe Dioecesis Rapotensis Deoise Ráth Bhoth

Catholic
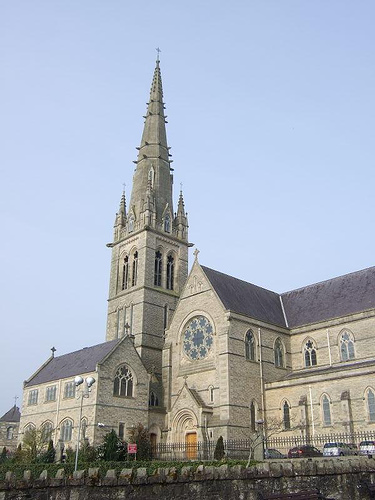
- The Cathedral of St Eunan and St Columba, Letterkenny, the episcopal seat of the bishops of Raphoe

Location
- Country: Ireland
- Territory: Most of County Donegal
- Ecclesiastical province: Province of Armagh
- Metropolitan: Archdiocese of Armagh

Statistics
- Area: 1,556 sq mi (4,030 km^{2})
- Population: Total; Catholics: (as of 2022); 90,800; 82,250 (90.6%)
- Parishes: 32
- Churches: 64

Information
- Denomination: Catholic Church
- Sui iuris church: Latin Church
- Rite: Roman Rite
- Established: 1111
- Cathedral: Cathedral of St Eunan and St Columba, Letterkenny
- Patron saint: St Eunan and St Columba
- Secular priests: 71

Current leadership
- Pope: Leo XIV
- Bishop: Niall Coll
- Metropolitan Archbishop: Eamon Martin
- Apostolic Administrator: Monsignor Kevin Gillespie
- Vicar General: Frs Michael McKeever, Francis McLoone
- Bishops emeritus: Philip Boyce

Map
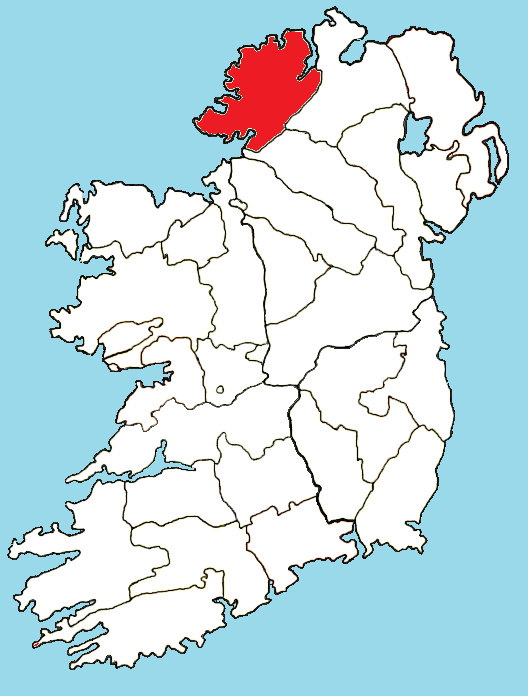

Website
- raphoediocese.ie

The Diocese of Raphoe (/rəˈfoʊ/ rə-FOH; Latin: Dioecesis Rapotensis; Irish: Deoise Ráth Bhoth) is a Latin Church ecclesiastical territory or diocese of the Catholic Church in County Donegal in Ulster, Ireland. It is one of eight suffragan dioceses in the inter-Irish primatial ecclesiastical province of the metropolitan Archdiocese of Armagh.

On 9 June 2017, Alan McGuckian was appointed Bishop of Raphoe and was ordained to the episcopate on 5 August 2017. On 13 November 2025 he was succeeded by Niall Coll.

== History ==
- Established circa 700 as Abbacy nullius of Raphoe / Rapoten(sis) (Latin)
- Promoted in 1111 as Diocese of Raphoe / Rapoten(sis) (Latin).

== Statistics and geographic remit ==
The bishopric covers most of County Donegal apart from the Inishowen peninsula in the north of the county and Bundoran in the South. The largest towns are Ballyshannon, Donegal, Letterkenny and Stranorlar. As per 2014 it pastorally served 82,600 Catholics (91.1% of 90,700 total) on 4,030 km^{2} (1555 sq. mi.) in 33 parishes with 85 priests (83 diocesan, 2 religious), 48 lay religious (4 brothers, 44 sisters) and 5 seminarians.

The bishop's residence – Ard Adomnán – is in the town of Letterkenny. It is located beside the Parochial House, near the Cathedral of St Eunan and St Columba which is dedicated to the joint patrons of the diocese – Saints Eunan (also known as Adomnán) and Columba (also known as Columcille). The former Cathedral, once Cathedral of St Eunan, also in Raphoe, is now a Protestant church.

== Episcopal ordinaries ==
Abbots Nullius of Raphoe
not available ?

Suffragan Bishops of Raphoe

- ... first incumbent(s) unavailable ?
- Gilla in Choimded Ua Caráin (Gilbert O’Caran) (1156?–1175), next Metropolitan Archbishop of Armagh (Northern Ireland) (1175 – death 1180)
- Máel Pátraic Ó Scannail (Patrick O’Scanlan), OP (1253.10 – 1261.11.05), next Metropolitan Archbishop of Armagh (Northern Ireland) (1261.11.05 – death 1270.03.16)
- Giovanni de Alneto, OFM (1263.12.03 – 1265.04.28)
- Cairpre Ó Scuapa (1265 – death 1274)
- Fergal Ó Firghil (Florentius O’Ferrell) (1275 – death 1299)
- Énri Mac in Chrossáin (Henricus) (1306 – death 1319)
- Tomás Mac Carmaic Uí Domnaill (1319 – death 1337)
- Pádraig Mac Maonghaill (? – death 1367)
- Conchobhar Mac Carmaic Uí Dhomhnaill (Cornelius) (1367.12.23 – retired 1397.02.21), died 1399
- Seoán Mac Meanmain, OCist (1397.02.21 – ?)
- Eóin Mac Carmaic (Johannes) (1400 – death 1419)
- Lochlainn Ó Gallchobhair (Laurentius) (1420.02.28 – death 1438)
- Cornelius Mac Giolla Bhrighde (1440.07.20 – death 1442)
- Lochlainn Ó Gallchobhair (Laurentius) (1442.06.18 – death 1479)
- Johannes de Rogeriis (1479.11.12 – death 1482)
- Meanma Mac Carmaic (Menelaus Mac Carmacáin) (1482.11.04 – retired 1514.02.06), died 1515
- Cornelius O’Cahan (Conn Ó Cathláin) (1514.02.06 – retired 1534), died ?1550
- Edmund O’Gallagher (Éamonn Ó Gallchobhair) (1534.05.11 – death 1543.02.26)
- Art O’Gallagher (1547.12.05 – death 1561.08.13)
- Donald MacGongail (Donald McGonagle) (1562.01.28 – death 1589.09.29)
- Niall O’Boyle (1591.08.09 – death 1611.02.06)
- John O’Cullenan (1625.06.09 – death 1661.03.24)
  - Apostolic Administrator Fergus Laurence Lea (1694.02.18 – death 1696), while Bishop of Derry (Northern Ireland) (1694.02.08 – 1696 not possessed)
- ...
- James O'Gallagher (1725–1737)
- Daniel O'Gallagher, OFM (1737–1749)
- Anthony O'Donnell, OFM (1750–1755)
- Nathaniel O'Donnell (1755–1758)
- Philip O'Reilly (1759–1782)
- Anthony Coyle (1782–1801), previously Coadjutor Bishop: Anthony Coyle (1777.04.27 – 1782)
  - Coadjutor Bishop: Fr. John McElvoy (1801.01.30 – 1801.09.20)
- Peter McLaughlin (1802–1819)
- Patrick McGettigan (1820–1861)
- Daniel McGettigan (1861–1870), previously Coadjutor Bishop: Daniel McGettigan (later Archbishop) (1856.02.29 – 1861.05.01)
- James McDevitt (1871–1879)
- Michael Logue (1879–1887)
- Patrick O'Donnell (1888–1922)
- William MacNeely (1923–1963)
- Anthony Columba McFeely (1965–1982)
- Séamus Hegarty (1982–1994)
- Philip Boyce, OCD (1995– 2017.06.09)
- Alan McGuckian, SJ (2017.06.09 – 2024.02.02)
- Niall Coll (2025.11.13 - ...)

== See also ==
- Catholic Church in Ireland
- List of Catholic dioceses in Ireland
- Sexual abuse scandal in Raphoe diocese
- Anglican counterpart Diocese of Derry and Raphoe (Church of Ireland)
