= Denis Campbell =

Scottish Anglican priest

Denis Campbell was a Scottish Anglican priest in Ireland.

A Scotsman, he became Archdeacon of Limerick in 1583 and Dean of Limerick in 1588. In 1603, he was nominated to the Sees of Derry, Clogher, and Raphoe.
