= William Hague (architect) =

Irish Roman Catholic ecclesiastical architect (1836–1899)

William Hague Jr.
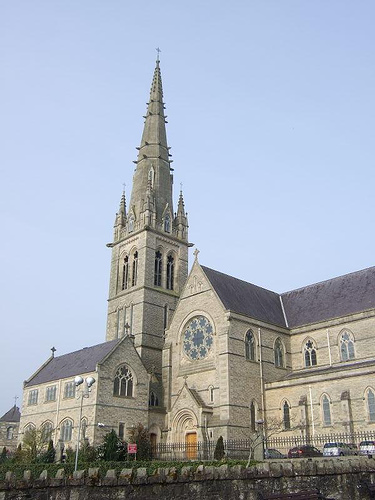
- St. Eunan's Cathedral
- Born: 1836; Cavan
- Died: 1899
- Other name: William Hague
- Occupation: Architect
- Known for: Prolific church architect

William Hague Jr. (1836–1899) was a well-known Irish Roman Catholic ecclesiastical architect active throughout mid- to late-nineteenth-century Ireland, particularly in Ulster. He is known as a protégé of A.W.N. Pugin. His office was located at 50 Dawson Street, Dublin.

== Life and career ==
He was born in County Cavan, the son of William Hague, a builder, and there designed several Roman Catholic churches, many in the French Gothic style. Hague died the year Omagh’s Sacred Heart was dedicated and consequently it was "a culmination of his amazing catalogue of completed ecclesiastical designs and his continuous championship of the Gothic Revival style," according to Richard Oram in Expressions of Faith-Ulster’s Church Heritage. Following his death, his partner T. F. McNamara took over most of his commissions under the firm name of Hague & McNamara.

== Works ==
- Immaculate Conception Roman Catholic Church, Strabane, County Tyrone (1890–1895)
- Sacred Heart Roman Catholic Church, Omagh, County Tyrone (1892–1899), designed in the French Gothic style and built by the Colhoun Brothers of Derry at the contract price of £46,000.
- St. Eunan’s Cathedral, Letterkenny, County Donegal, completed by his partner T. F. McNamara following his death.
- Ballyboy Catholic Church, County Cavan
- St Aidan's Church, Butlersbridge, County Cavan
- Kingscourt Catholic Church, County Cavan
- Presentation Convent, Wexford (western wing only, 1890)
- St. Macartan's Roman Catholic Cathedral, Monaghan (spire only, 1882–1892)
- Swanlinbar Catholic Church, County Cavan
- St Joseph's Roman Catholic Church, Park Street, Monaghan (1900)
- Sacred Heart Roman Catholic Church, Carrickroe, Emyvale, County Monaghan (1823, enlarged 1885–1888 by Hague with date plaque of 1886)
- Kildare Carmelite Church, Kildare (1887)
- Church of Saint John the Evangelist, Kilkenny (1903–1908)
- St Patrick's College, Cavan
- St Brigid's Catholic Church, Killeshandra, County Cavan
- St Clare's Catholic Church, Manorhamilton, County Leitrim
- St Patrick's Roman Catholic Church, Milltown, County Cavan
- Archbishops Palace, Drumcondra, Dublin
- Sligo Town Hall, Sligo
- Carlow Town Hall, Carlow
- Church of the Sacred Heart, Aughrim, County Wicklow
- St Rynagh's Catholic Church, Banagher, County Offaly
