= Hague & McNamara =

Irish architectural firm

Hague & McNamara was an Irish architectural firm active from 1899 until at least 1907 in Dublin active throughout Ireland. It was formed by the widow of recently deceased architect William Hague Jr. and his managing director T. F. McNamara. Hague had died in 1899 and the practice continued out of his office at Hague's former address on Dawson Street, Dublin.

== Works ==
- 1902–1906 – St. Matthew's RC Church, Ballymahon, County Longford
- 1904 – Temperance Hall, Longford, County Longford
- 1904–1906 – St. Mary's RC Church, Finea, County Westmeath
