= Safeguarding =

Measures to protect the health, well-being and human rights of individuals

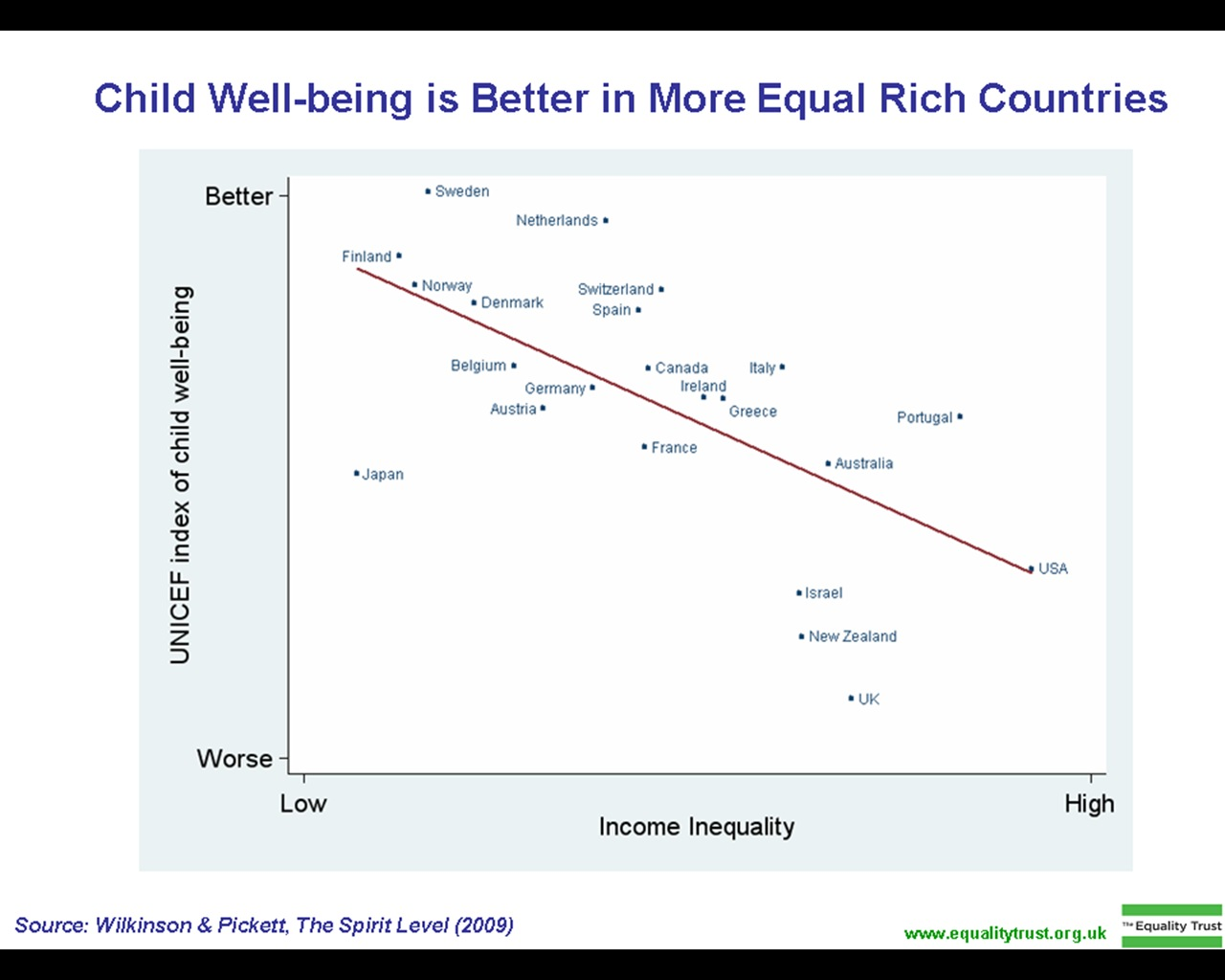
Child well-being is better in rich countries with low economic inequality.

Safeguarding is a term used in the United Kingdom, Ireland and Australia to denote measures to protect the health, well-being and human rights of individuals, which allow people—especially children, young people and vulnerable adults—to live free from abuse, harm and neglect.

Any child can be considered to be at risk of harm or abuse, regardless of age, ethnicity, gender, sex or religion. The UK government has enacted legislation and published guidance to protect children from maltreatment, prevent the impairment of children's health or development, ensure children grow up in circumstances consistent with the provision of safe and effective care, and enable children and young people to have the best outcomes. Responsibility for these aims is deemed to lie with everyone who comes into contact with children and families.

Adults in need of safeguarding help may be elderly and frail people who live alone or in care homes with little support from family members, they may have mental health issues, a physical disability or learning difficulties, or they may be at risk in the community due to problems including domestic or sexual violence. Professional carers ideally focus on empowerment, protection, prevention, proportionate responses, partnership and accountability to safeguard vulnerable adults. In Birmingham and the West Midlands, the term 'adults at risk' is preferred over 'vulnerable adults'.

== Children ==
=== UK ===
Safeguarding children is a concept that reaches beyond child protection to incorporate the additional aims of preventing the harm of children's health and development, ensuring children are growing up in circumstances consistent with the provision of safe and effective care.

The UK Government has defined the term 'safeguarding children' as: "The process of protecting children from abuse or neglect, preventing impairment of their health and development, and ensuring they are growing up in circumstances consistent with the provision of safe and effective care that enables children to have optimum life chances and enter adulthood successfully."

This shift from traditional child protection to a more all-encompassing approach was influenced by the first Joint Chief Inspectors' safeguarding children report (2002) and the Victoria Climbié Inquiry (2003). The Every Child Matters programme outlined in the Children Act 2004 formalised these changes in approach into a legislative framework. Every Child Matters aimed to improve outcomes for children in five key areas; being healthy, staying safe, enjoying and achieving, making a positive contribution and achieving economic well-being.

To help achieve this the Act made a number of institutional changes including the abolition of Area Child Protection Committees that had been deemed to have performed poorly in some areas by the Joint Chief Inspectors' 2002 report and the formation of the multi-agency Local Safeguarding Children Boards (LSCBs). These consisted of representatives from local partner agencies such as housing, health, police and probation services. The LSCBs were charged with co-ordinating the functions of all partner agencies in relation to safeguarding children. They carry out this function by, among other things, agreeing the contribution of all member agencies and deciding how these pooled funds should be allocated. In addition, they are responsible for commissioning independent Serious Case Reviews and training member agency staff in safeguarding children best practice. The Act also placed a duty on all agencies to make arrangements to safeguard and promote the welfare of children.

In 2006 the government released Working Together to Safeguard Children, which set out the ways in which organizations and individuals should work together to safeguard and promote the wellbeing of children. In 2010 this was superseded by Working Together to Safeguard Children (2010) which expanded the focus on inter-agency working and took into account the recommendations of Lord Laming's 2008 progress report The Protection of Children in England which suggested it was imperative that frontline professionals get to know children as individuals. Working Together to Safeguard Children has been updated again in 2015 and again in 2018. This latest (Working Together to Safeguard Children 2018) supersedes all former versions.

In educational settings, safeguarding responsibilities are subject to statutory guidance set out in Keeping Children Safe in Education, first published 26 March 2015, most recent edition published in September 2025. This guidance was revised with effect from 1 September 2020. Changes made in 2020 include making clear that both mental and physical health are relevant to safeguarding and the welfare of children, and the role of mandatory Relationship Education, Relationship and Sex Education and Health Education in safeguarding. (Note: There are proposed changes for 2026 which, as of April 2026, are being consulted on by the Department for Education.) Teachers' standards in England require teachers to "safeguard children's wellbeing and maintain public trust in the teaching profession as part of their professional duties".

In 2014 a High Court judge said that it appeared to be a practice "widespread across the country" that children were taken into foster care based on social services reports which family courts "cut and pasted" into their own rulings, without giving the parents the opportunity to view the reports or respond to them.

=== US ===
In the US, some public school systems have adopted the Child Lures' Prevention program. The presentations to adults and children are coordinated between sheriff departments and school resource officers.

=== Assessment ===
A key part of safeguarding work is assessment.

Professionals conducting assessments of families where neglect is taking place are said sometimes to make the error of not asking the right questions, such as:

- Is neglect occurring?
- Why is neglect occurring?
- What is the situation like for the child?
- Are improvements in the family likely to be sustained?
- What needs to be done to ensure the long-term safety of the child?

== Adults ==
The Care Act 2014 introduced new legislation regarding safeguarding vulnerable adults. Increasingly, the terms adult at risk, or adult at risk of harm, are preferred to the term vulnerable adult. The Care Act sets out a legal framework for how local authorities and other organisations should react to suspicion of abuse or neglect.

== Recent developments ==
In 2026, the Crime and Policing Act 2026 introduced new notification requirements for registered sex offenders who change their name, closing a loophole that had allowed offenders to alter their identity and evade monitoring by the authorities. Offenders must give police at least seven days' notice before changing their name, and the police may refuse permission for a name change on a passport, driving licence or other official document where this is judged necessary to protect the public from sexual harm.

The reform followed a campaign led by Della Wright, a survivor of child sexual abuse who discovered that her abuser had changed his name several times before her case reached court. It became widely known in the press as "Della's Law". Wright has campaigned on the issue as a survivor ambassador for The Safeguarding Alliance, one of several specialist organisations that have emerged in the UK focused specifically on safeguarding training, policy and practice, alongside older bodies such as Thirtyone:eight (formerly the Churches' Child Protection Advisory Service), a Christian safeguarding charity founded in 1977.

== See also ==
- National Board for Safeguarding Children in the Catholic Church (Ireland)
- Safeguarding Vulnerable Groups Act 2006 (United Kingdom)
