= Conn Ó Catháin =

Irish bishop

Conn Ó Catháin was Bishop of Raphoe.

Ó Catháin was bishop from 6 February 1514, and accepted royal supremacy of King Henry VIII in 1534. Ó Catháin died in or after 1550.
