= Sligo Town Hall =

Municipal building in Sligo, County Sligo, Ireland

- Halla Baile Shligigh
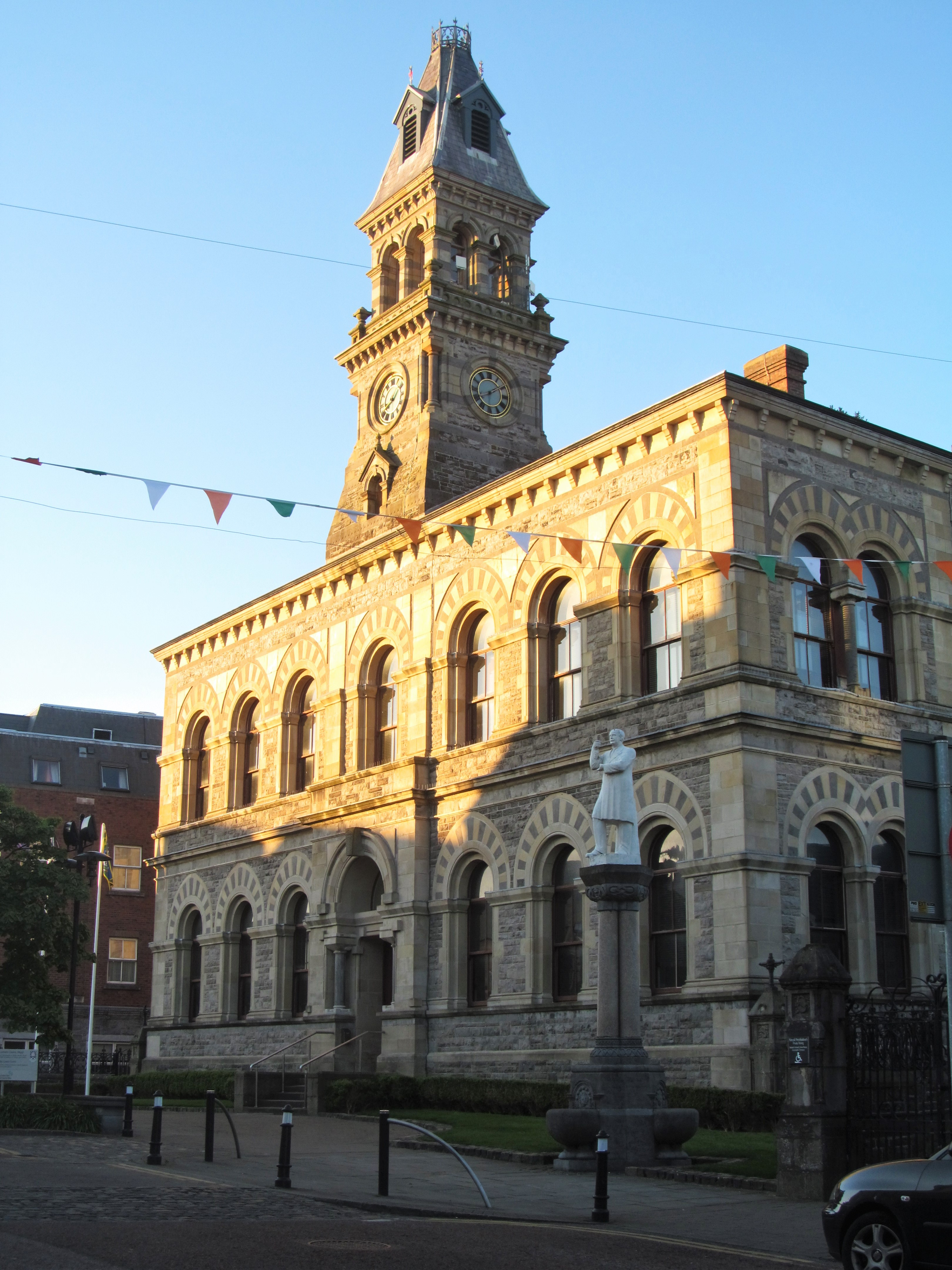
- Sligo Town Hall

- Location within Ireland

General information
- Architectural style: Lombard Romanesque style
- Location: Quay Street, Sligo, Ireland
- Coordinates: 54.2729°N 8.4759°W
- Completed: 1874

Design and construction
- Architect: William Hague

Sligo Town Hall (Irish: Halla Baile Shligigh) is a municipal building in Quay Street, Sligo, County Sligo, Ireland. The building accommodated the offices of Sligo Borough Council until 2014.

== History ==
=== Design and construction ===
Sligo Corporation resolved to commission a town hall in 1825: however, that scheme collapsed and for many years the corporation continued to rent an office for its meetings. In 1860, the corporation asked the Lord Lieutenant of Ireland, George Howard, 7th Earl of Carlisle, to support an application an HM Treasury for a contribution to the cost, with the balance being financed by public subscription. The site the corporation selected was occupied by an old fort which dated back to 1646, although archaeologists have suggested that it may have originally been the site of Sligo Castle which dated back to 1245.

The foundation stone for the new building was laid by the mayor, William Abbott Woods, on 12 October 1865. It was designed by William Hague in the Lombard Romanesque style, built by Crowe Brothers in rubble masonry with ashlar stone dressings at a cost of £6,863, and was opened for business in time for the a meeting of the council in July 1872. Because of the very high standard of workmanship and associated cost over-runs, the building was not entirely complete until 1874.

The design involved a symmetrical main frontage of seven bays facing onto Quay Street. The central bay featured an entrance, which was slightly projected forward, involving a round headed doorway flanked by colonnettes supporting an architrave and a keystone. The other bays on the ground floor and all bays on the first floor were fenestrated by round headed windows with architraves and alternating sandstone and limestone voussoirs. At roof level, there was a modillioned cornice and a central three-stage tower with a round headed window in the first stage, clock faces in the second stage, and a belfry in the third stage, all surmounted by a pyramid-shaped roof with louvre dormers and octagonal-shaped iron cresting. The clock tower was built by a local contractor, Patrick Morris, and paid for by the Harbour Commissioners, on the basis that it gave them a good view of shipping entering and leaving the port. The clock was designed and manufactured by James and Francis Nelson and installed in 1877. Internally, the principal room was the assembly hall on the first floor which was 75.5 feet (23.0 m) long and 33 feet (10 m) wide.

=== Later history ===
A public library was established in the town hall in September 1880, and a caretaker's lodge, designed by William Cochrane and built by Denis McLynn, was erected to the south of the town hall in 1896.

The assembly hall was a regular public events venue: a meeting of the Irish Trades Union Congress, at which Alexander Bowman was elected president, was held on the town hall in May 1901. The Roman Catholic Priest, Michael O'Flanagan, delivered Irish language teaching in the town hall; he was a founding member and secretary of the Sligo Feis, at which the Irish nationalist, Padraig Pearse, gave a lecture titled "The Saving of a Nation" in the town hall in 1903. Another Irish nationalist, Constance Markievicz, also attended the town hall to receive the Freedom of Sligo in August 1917.

In September 1948, a guard of honour was posted outside the town hall as the body of the Irish poet, W. B. Yeats, was moved to the churchyard of St Columba's Church, Drumcliff. A fine mural painted by Bernard McDonagh depicting the Wanderings of Oisin, created as a memorial to Yeats, was unveiled in the town hall in 1958. However, it was later taken down and placed in storage in the basement.

A statue to commemorate the life of the Irish nationalist politician, P. A. McHugh, sculpted by Hanrahan of Dublin, was re-located from outside the post office in O'Connell Street, to the front of the town hall in the 1970s.

An extensive programme of refurbishment works, which involved the creation of a five-bay extension to the rear, was completed in 2000. The football managers, Sir Alex Ferguson and Jack Charlton, visited the town hall as part of a tribute to the Irish footballer, Sean Fallon in 2002. The assembly room continued to serve as the council chamber of Sligo Borough Council, until the council was dissolved and administration of the town was amalgamated with Sligo County Council in 2014.
