= William MacNeely =

Bishop William MacNeely
- Bishop of Raphoe
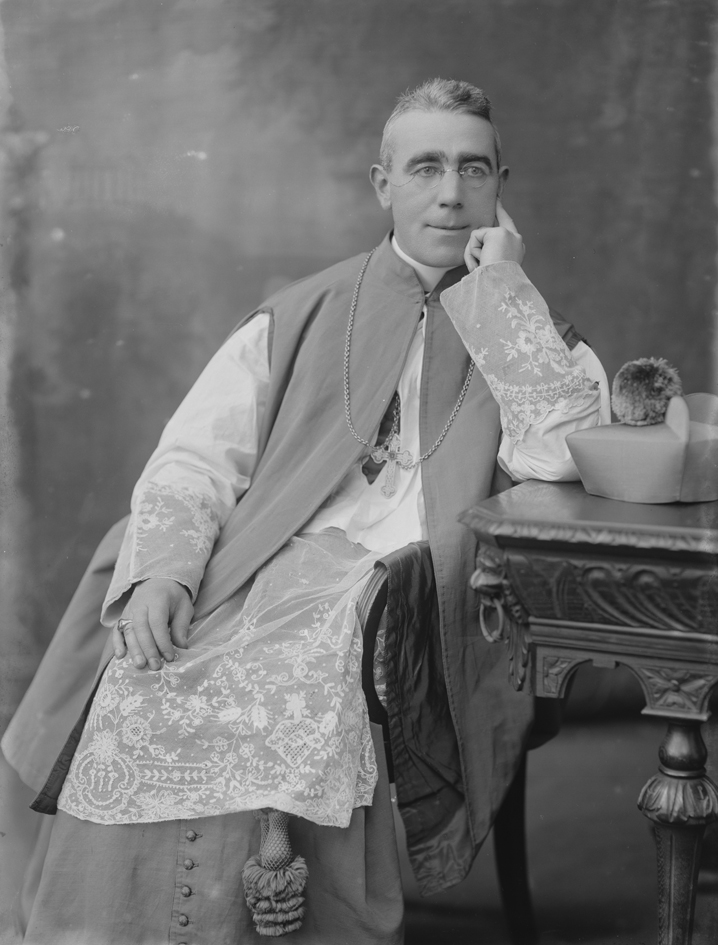
- Church: Catholic Church
- See: Raphoe
- In office: from 1923 to 1963
- Predecessor: Patrick O'Donnell
- Successor: Anthony Columba McFeely

Personal details
- Born: County Donegal, Ireland

The Most Reverend William MacNeely was the Bishop of Raphoe from 1923 until 1963.

== Early life and education ==
William MacNeely was born in Dec 1889; his father was a butcher in Donegal Town. MacNeely was educated at the High School in Letterkenny, and in Rome from 1906–12. He was ordained to the priesthood on 4 February 1912 and upon his return to Ireland was appointed to the staff of St Eunan's College.

MacNeely served for two years as chaplain with the Irish Battalions in the British Army in the First World War.

== Bishop of Raphoe ==
In July 1923, at the comparatively young age of 35, he was appointed as Bishop of Raphoe in succession to Bishop Patrick O'Donnell who had been appointed to Armagh the previous year. In that role he was responsible for the completion of Letterkenny Cathedral and negotiating with Harry Clarke to finish the work of glazing the cathedral.

Keen to develop religious life in his diocese, he invited the Capuchin Franciscans to the Creeslough area in 1930 to a site that would become known as Ards Priory.

In 2008, it was reported that MacNeely was one of the two Irish episcopal coordinators who worked alongside "an intelligence-gathering secret service" set up in 1948 to monitor any sign of a "Communist takeover" of Ireland.

In 1953, he was a member of the inaugural Episcopal Commission for Emigrants reflecting the high levels of migration that afflicted his diocese and wider Donegal for much of the twentieth century.

He served as Bishop for over forty years attending the early sessions of the Second Vatican Council, and died in December 1963.

The bishop was also a successful breeder of Shorthorn cattle.

Religious titles
| Preceded by Patrick O'Donnell | Bishop of Raphoe | Succeeded by Anthony Columba McFeely |
