= Conwal Parish Church (Church of Ireland) =

Church building in Letterkenny, Ireland

Coordinates: 54.95107°N 7.73867°W

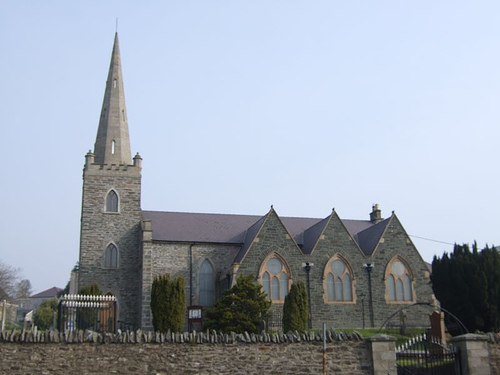
Conwal Parish Church

Conwal Parish Church is a Church of Ireland church located in Letterkenny, County Donegal, Ireland. It is located opposite the Cathedral of St Eunan and St Columba at the top of Church Street. The church dates back to the 17th century.

== Building ==
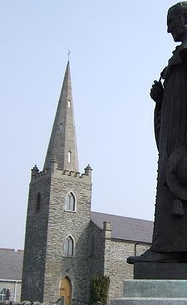
The ashlar spire seen beyond statue commemorating Cardinal Patrick O'Donnell in St Eunan's Cathedral grounds

The building is believed to have been constructed when a church located at Conwal, not far from Churchill, fell into ruins. The church is rubble built with an ashlar spire. The interior retains its early 19th century cast-iron circular roof, trusses and a short gallery and twisted brass brackets.

== Graveyard ==
A niece of Jane Austen (daughter of her brother Edward), is buried in the graveyard there, alongside her husband Lord George Hill.

Vandals "smashed to smithereens" the tombstone of the Wray vault, dating from 1750 and the oldest in the graveyard, in 1971.

== History ==
The Civil Survey of 1652-56 gives an interesting image into what the town was like in the 17th century:

"There is a town called Letterkenny which hath a market every Friday and two fairs in the year with a fair Church and a bridge at the east end over the River Swilly".

It is stated that the church is in good repair and that in 1733 it was slated and one side seated. All of these changes took place while the Rev. William Spann, a rector who did a lot for the parish, was in Letterkenny. The chalice and paten dated 1744 are still in use to this day. These were given to the church by Dr. Spann. Dr. Spann died in 1752 and is buried under the Church.

== People ==
Church interior

There is a popular myth that the remains of Redmond O'Hanlon are also located on the church grounds. A large flat stone in the graveyard opposite the vestry door marks a Hanlon family grave several decades younger than the rapparee's death. An obelisk stands at the East side of the church to commemorate Rev. Dr. John Kinnear, a Presbyterian minister in Letterkenny, who was M.P. for County Donegal and carried the banner for Tenants Rights in the 1880s. Joseph Stopford, grandfather of Stopford Augustus Brooke, is a former rector of the church.

As of July 2018, the Parish is served by their Rector - Reverend David Houlton who currently resides in the Conwal Rectory in Letterkenny. He also serves the Church of Ireland Church of Saint Columba in Gartan, which is around 15 miles outside of Letterkenny.

Sunday Services held in Conwal Parish Church are Early Morning Eucharist at 8.00am. Sunday Worship in the form of the Holy Eucharist is held at 10.30am on the 1st and 3rd Sundays of the month, with Morning Prayer held on the other Sundays. In Saint Columba's, Gartan, Sunday Worship is held at 12.30pm in the form of the Holy Eucharist on the 1st and 3rd Sundays of the month, with Morning Prayer held on all other Sundays.
