= Thomas Francis McNamara =

Irish Roman Catholic ecclesiastical architect

- Born: 1867
- Died: January 1947 (aged 79–80)
- Other names: T.F. McNamara
- Occupation: architect
- Known for: church and hospital architect

Thomas Francis McNamara, RIAI, RIBA (1867–1947) was an Irish Roman Catholic ecclesiastical architect active throughout the late-nineteenth to the mid-twentieth century in Ireland who designed many hospitals and Roman Catholic churches.

== Life ==
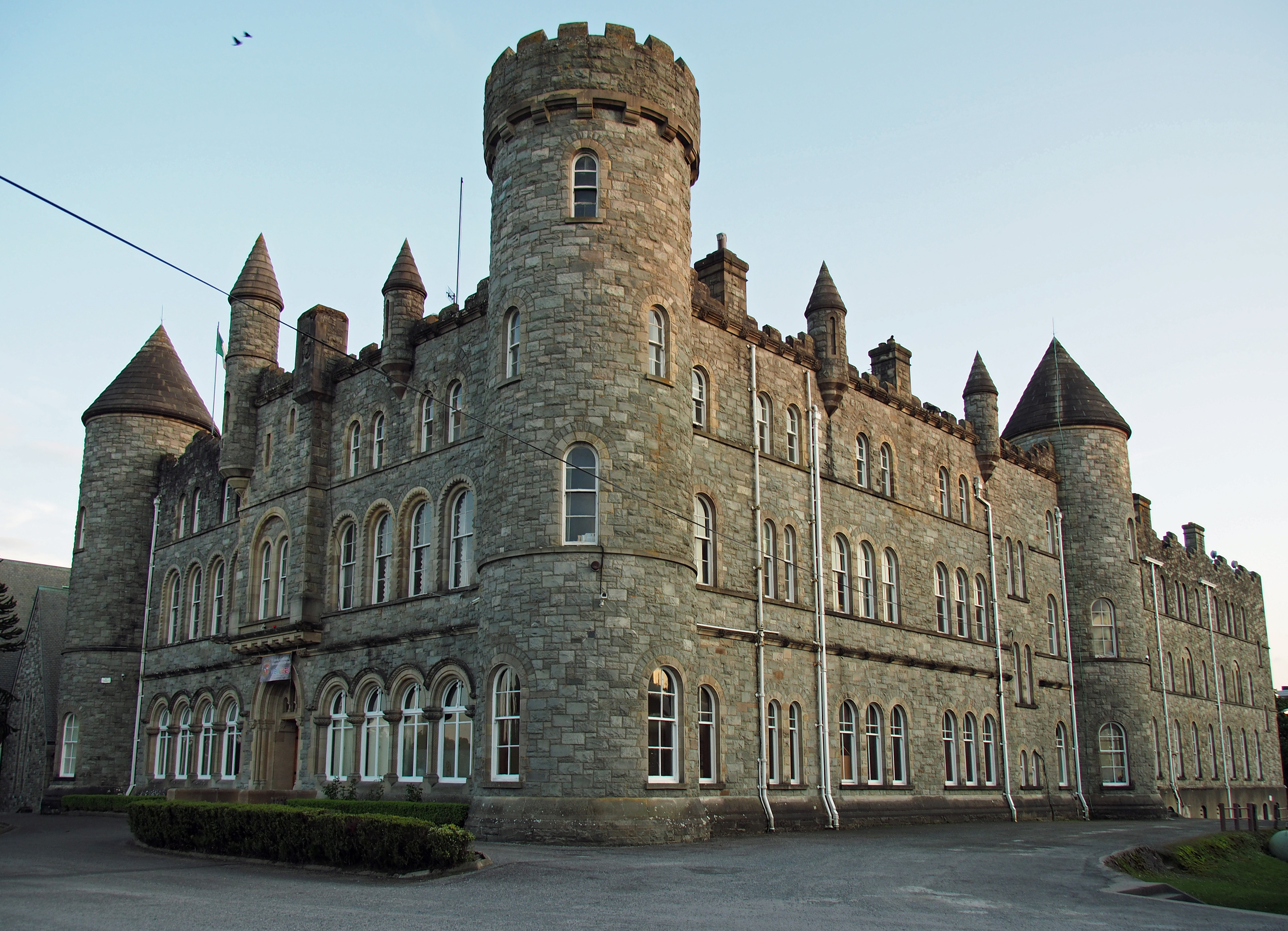
St Eunan's College, Letterkenny

McNamara started his career as a pupil and later managing assistant of William Hague Jr., an architect who designed many Roman Catholic churches generally in the French Gothic style, McNamara rose from being a pupil to managing assistant.

After Hague's death in 1899, McNamara took over most of his commissions, forming a business partnership with Hague's widow, practising as Hague & McNamara until about 1907, when he practised under his own name, the firm of T. F. McNamara. After this, he ventured more into Hispano-Romanesque architecture. His office was located on Dawson Street, Dublin, until 1911, at number 50. In 1912, he was appointed architect to the Dublin Joint Hospital Board. McNamara relocated his office to 192 Great Brunswick Street, Dublin, where he worked until 1927. From 1927 until his death, his office was located at number 5 Dawson Street.

McNamara was the father of architects Patrick Noel and Charles G. McNamara, who were partners in his firm from the 1920s. Charles absorbed his practice into his own after McNamara's death in January 1947.

Among McNamara's pupils was Harry Clarke, who he advised to pursue art over a career in architecture.

== Works ==
- Sacred Heart Roman Catholic Church, Omagh (1892-1899), designed in the French Gothic style and built by the Colhoun Brothers of Derry at the contract price of £46,000
- County Hospital at Mullingar, begun in 1933
- St Eunan's College, Letterkenny, County Donegal
- Crooksling Sanatorium, Brittas, County Dublin
- 28 houses on Bath Avenue, Dublin
- Numbers 8 and 9, Moore Street, Dublin
