= Bishop of Raphoe =

Bishop in Ireland

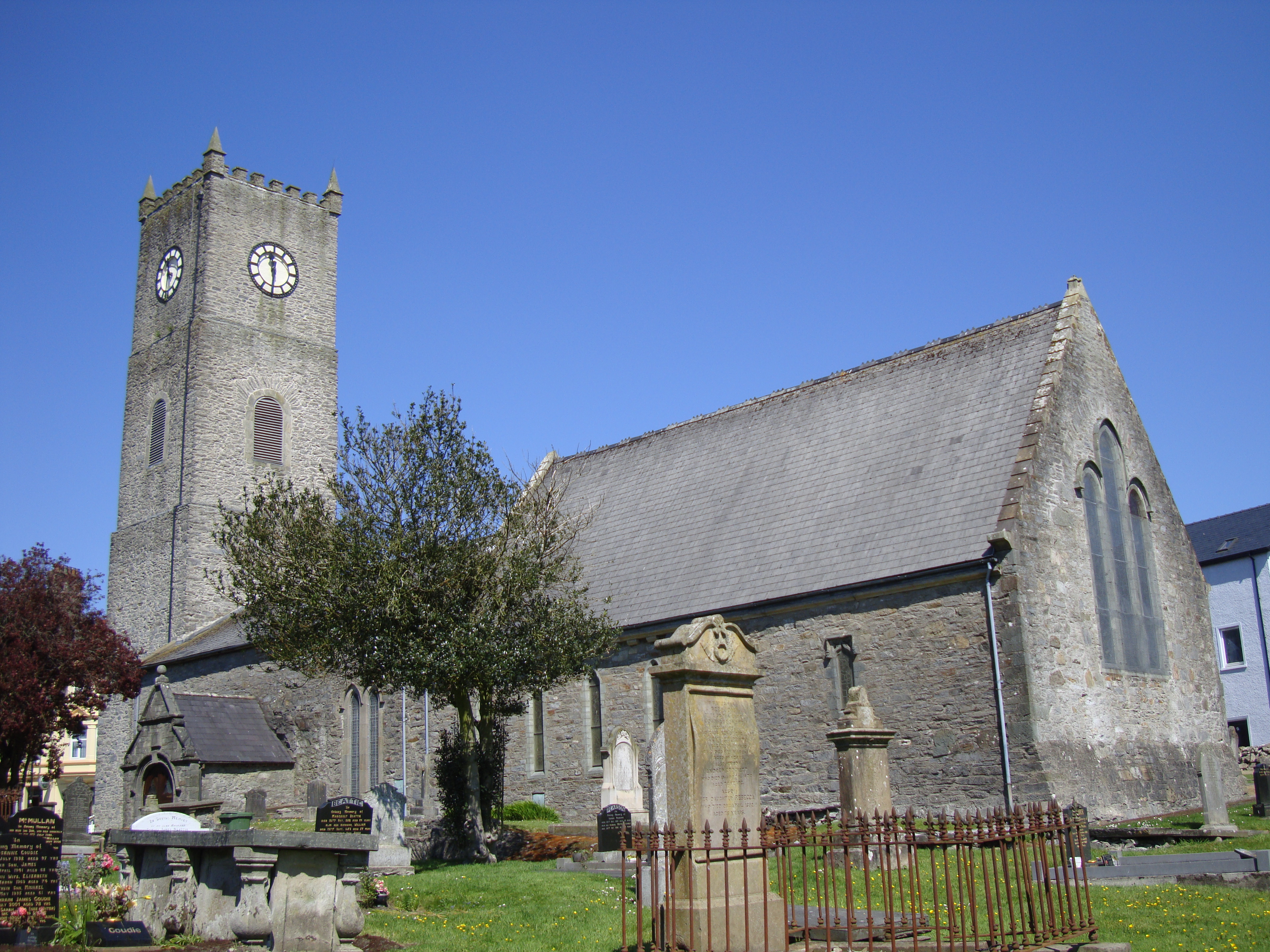
The Cathedral of St Eunan, Raphoe, the episcopal seat of the pre-Reformation and Church of Ireland bishops of Raphoe

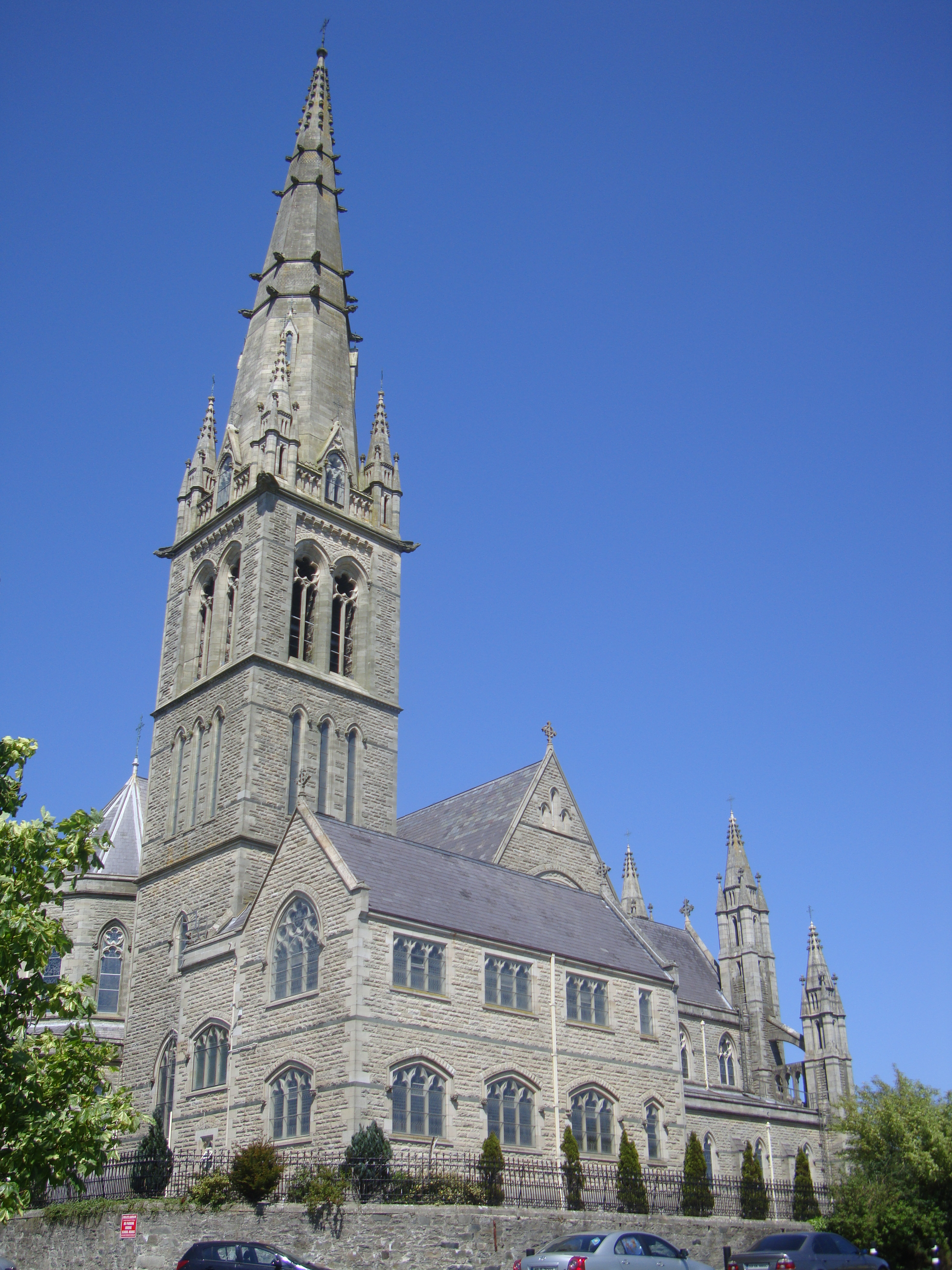
The Cathedral of St Eunan and St Columba, Letterkenny, the episcopal seat of the post-Reformation Catholic bishops of Raphoe

The Bishop of Raphoe (/ræˈfoʊ/ ra-FOH) is an episcopal title which takes its name after the town of Raphoe in County Donegal, Ireland. In the Catholic Church it remains a separate title, but in the Church of Ireland it has been united with another bishopric.

== History ==
In the earliest period of the diocese, the episcopal see was often referred to as Tír Conaill (the surrounding region). It was also sometimes written as Ráith Both, the Middle Irish spelling of the location. In 1266, Bishop Germanus of Derry forcibly transferred the Inishowen peninsula from the jurisdiction of the Diocese of Raphoe to the Diocese of Derry.

After the Reformation, there were parallel episcopal successions. In the Church of Ireland, the title continued until 1834 when it united with Derry and formed the united bishopric of Derry and Raphoe.

In the Catholic Church, the title continues as a separate bishopric. The current incumbent is Alan McGuckian, who was appointed by the Holy See on 9 June 2017 and ordained bishop on 6 August 2017.

== List of bishops ==
=== Pre-Reformation ===
Pre-Reformation Bishops of Raphoe
From	Until	Ordinary	Notes
dates unknown		Eóin Ua Gairedáin (Note: The first three bishops are known only from a seventeenth-century catalogue of the bishop of Raphoe.)	
dates unknown		Domnall Ua Garbáin	Also recorded as Domnall Ua Garbáin.
dates unknown		Feidlimid Ua Sida	Also recorded as Feidlimid Ua Sida.
bef. 1156	c. 1175	Gilla in Choimded Ua Caráin	Also known as Gilbert O'Caran, or Gillebertus. Became bishop of Raphoe before 1156. Translated to Armagh circa 1175.
unknown	1198	(Name not known)	Resigned before 18 March 1198.
bef. 1204	1252	Máel Ísu Ua Doirig	Became bishop before 1204. Resigned before 7 March 1252.
1253	1261	Máel Patraic Ua Scannail, OP	Also known as Patrick Ó Scannail, or Patricius. Elected circa November 1253 and consecrated on 30 November 1253. Translated to Armagh on 5 November 1261.
1263	1265	Giovanni de Alneto, OFM	Also known as Johannes. Appointed on 3 December 1263. Resigned on 28 April 1265.
1265	1274	Cairpre Ó Scuapa, OP	Appointed after 28 April 1265. Acted as a suffragan bishop in the Diocese of Canterbury (1273). Died in office on 9 May 1274.
c. 1275	1299	Fergal Ó Firghil	Also known as Fergal O'Ferrell, or Florentius. Became bishop circa 1275. Died in office in 1299.
bef. 1306	1306	(Tomás Ó Naán, bishop-elect)	Archdeacon of Raphoe. Elected bishop before 1306, but was never consecrated. Died in 1306.
1306	1319	Énri Mac in Chrossáin	Also known as Henricus. Became bishop circa 1306. Died in office in 1319.
1319	1337	Tomás Mac Carmaic Uí Domnaill, OCist	Formerly abbot of Assaroe Abbey. Elected bishop in 1319. Died in office in 1337.
unknown	1367	Pádraig Mac Maonghaill	Died in office before October 1367. Appointed Archbishop of Armagh in error in 1363, but the appointment never took effect.
1367	1397	Conchobhar Mac Carmaic Uí Dhomhnaill, OCist	Also known as Cornelius. Formerly abbot of Assaroe Abbey and a canon of Raphoe Cathedral. Appointed on 23 December 1367. Resigned on 21 February 1397 and died in 1399.
1397	unknown	Seoán Mac Meanmain, OCist	Formerly a monk at Assaroe Abbey. Appointed on 21 February 1397.
1400	1419	Eóin Mac Carmaic	Also known as Johannes. Appointed before 8 December 1400. Died in office in 1419.
1420	1438	Lochlainn Ó Gallchobhair (I.)	Also known as Laurentius. Formerly Dean of Raphoe. Elected bishop before 27 February and appointed on 28 February 1420. Died in office in 1438.
1440	1442	Cornelius Mac Giolla Bhrighde	Formerly Dean of Raphoe. Appointed on 20 July 1440 and consecrated after 30 July 1440. Died in office before June 1442.
1443	1479	Lochlainn Ó Gallchobhair (II.)	Also known as Laurentius. Formerly a canon and official of Raphoe Cathedral. Appointed on 18 June 1442 and consecrated after 23 July 1443. Died in office before November 1479.
1479	1482	Johannes de Rogeriis	Possibly also known as Seaín Mac Ruaidhri. Formerly a priest of the Roman Church. Appointed on 12 November 1479. Died in office before November 1482.
1482	1514	Meanma Mac Carmaic	Also known as Menelaus Mac Carmacáin. Formerly Dean of Raphoe. Appointed on 4 November 1482. Resigned on 6 February 1514 and died on 9 May 1515.

=== Reformation ===
Bishops of Raphoe during the Reformation
From	Until	Ordinary	Notes
1514	aft. 1550	Conn Ó Catháin	Also known as Conn Ó Cathláin. Appointed by the papacy on 6 February 1514. Accepted royal supremacy in 1534. Died after 1550.
1534	1543	Éamonn Ó Gallchobhair	Also known as Edmund O'Gallagher. Appointed by the papacy on 11 May 1534, in opposition to O'Cahan, but was unable to take possession of the See. Died on 26 February 1543.
1547/54	1561	Art Ó Gallchobhair	Appointed by the papacy in 1547, in opposition to Ó Catháin, but did not take possession of the see until papal supremacy was re-established in Ireland by Queen Mary I in 1554. After the accession of Queen Elizabeth I in 1558, his position was uncertain. Died on 13 August 1561.

=== Post-Reformation ===
==== Church of Ireland succession ====
Church of Ireland Bishops of Raphoe
From	Until	Ordinary	Notes
1561	1603	See vacant	
1603		(Denis Campbell)	Dean of Limerick (1588–1603). Nominated as Bishop of Raphoe, Derry and Clogher in 1603, but died before consecration in July in the same year.
1603	1605	See vacant	
1605	1609	George Montgomery	Nominated on 15 February and appointed by letters patent on 13 June 1605. Also was bishop of Derry (1605–1609), Clogher (1605–1621), and Meath (1609–1621). Died on 15 January 1621.
1611	1633	Andrew Knox	Translated from The Isles. Nominated on 7 May 1610 and appointed by letters patent on 26 June 1611. Died in office on 17 March 1633.
1633	1661	John Leslie	Translated from The Isles. Nominated on 8 April 1633 and appointed by letters patent on 1 June 1633. Translated to Clogher on 17 June 1661.
1661	1671	Robert Leslie	Translated from Dromore. Nominated on 29 April and appointed by letters patent on 20 June 1661. Translated to Clogher on 26 October 1671.
1671	1681	Ezekiel Hopkins	Nominated on 6 September 1671 and consecrated on 29 October 1671. Translated to Derry on 11 November 1681.
1682	1693	William Smyth	Translated from Killala and Achonry. Nominated on 16 January and appointed by letters patent on 17 February 1682. Translated to Kilmore and Ardagh on 5 April 1693.
1693	1701	Alexander Cairncross	Formerly Archbishop of Glasgow (1684–1687). Nominated on 22 March 1693 and appointed by letters patent on 16 May 1693. Died in office on 14 May 1701.
1701		Robert Huntington	Nominated on 7 June 1701 and consecrated on 20 July 1701. Died in office on 2 September 1701.
1702	1712	John Pooley	Translated from Cloyne. Nominated on 14 May 1702 and appointed by letters patent on 12 September 1702. Died in office on 16 October 1712.
1713	1714	Thomas Lindsay	Translated from Killaloe. Nominated on 23 April 1713 and appointed by letters patent on 6 June 1713. Translated to Armagh on 4 January 1714.
1714	1716	Edward Synge	Formerly Chancellor of St Patrick's Cathedral, Dublin. Nominated on 7 October 1714 and consecrated on 7 November 1714. Translated to Tuam on 8 June 1716.
1716	1743	Nicholas Forster	Translated from Killaloe. Nominated on 22 May 1716 and appointed by letters patent on 8 June 1716. Died in office on 5 June 1743.
1744	1747	William Barnard	Formerly Dean of Rochester (1743–1744). Nominated on 20 April 1744 and consecrated on 19 August 1744. Translated to Derry on 19 March 1747.
1747	1752	Philip Twysden	Nominated on 28 February 1746 and consecrated on 29 March 1747. Died in office on 2 November 1752, allegedly shot while committing a robbery of a stagecoach near London. His only surviving child was from his second marriage and posthumous, Frances Twysden (1753–1821).
1753	1763	Robert Downes	Translated from Down and Connor. Nominated on 28 December 1752 and appointed by letters patent on 16 January 1753. Died in office on 30 June 1763.
1763	1780	John Oswald	Translated from Dromore. Nominated on 18 July 1763 and appointed by letters patent on 25 August 1763. Died in office on 4 March 1780.
1780	1807	James Hawkins	Translated from Dromore. Nominated on 20 March 1780 and appointed by letters patent on 1 April 1780. Died in office on 23 June 1807.
1807	1819	Lord John Beresford	Translated from Cork and Ross. Nominated on 23 July 1807 and appointed by letters patent on 10 August 1807. Translated to Clogher on 25 September 1819.
1819	1822	William Magee	Formerly Dean of Cork. Appointed by letters patent on 22 September 1819 and consecrated on 24 October 1819. Translated to Dublin on 24 June 1822.
1822	1834	William Bissett	Nominated on 17 June 1822 and consecrated on 21 July 1822. Died in office on 5 September 1834.
Since 1834, the Church of Ireland see has been part of the united bishopric of Derry and Raphoe

==== Catholic succession ====
Catholic Bishops of Raphoe
From	Until	Ordinary	Notes
1562	1589	Dónal Mag Congail	Anglicised into Donald McGonagle. Appointed on 28 January 1562. Died in office on 29 September 1589.
1589	1591	See vacant	
1591	1611	Niall Ó Baoighill	Appointed on 9 August 1591. Died in office on 6 February 1611.
1611	1621	See vacant	
1621	1661	Eóin Ó Cuileannáin	Known in English as John O'Cullenan. Appointed vicar apostolic by papal brief on 1 December 1621 and reappointed bishop by papal brief on 9 June 1625. Consecrated in 1629. Left Ireland in March 1653 and died in exile on 24 March 1661.
1657	unknown	(Hugh Ó Gallchobhair, vicar apostolic)	Appointed vicar apostolic by papal brief on 10 July 1657.
1695	1697	(Fergus Laurence Lea, apostolic administrator)	Bishop of Derry (1694–1697). Appointed Apostolic Administrator of Raphoe on 18 February 1695. Died on 19 January 1697.
1697	1725	See vacant	
1725	1737	James Ó Gallchobhair	Appointed by papal brief on 21 July 1725 and consecrated on 25 November 1725. Translated to Kildare and Leighlin on 18 May 1737.
1737	1749	Bonaventure O'Gallagher, OFM	Also known as Daniel O'Gallagher. Appointed by papal brief on 10 December 1737 and consecrated on 29 December 1737. Died in office in 1749.
1750	1755	Anthony Ó Dónaill, OFM	Appointed by papal brief on 19 January 1750. Died in office on 20 or 26 April 1755.
1755	1758	Nathaniel Ó Dónaill	Appointed by papal brief on 18 July 1755. Died in office in 1758.
1759	1782	Philip Ó Raghallaigh	Appointed by papal brief on 9 January 1759 and consecrated on 22 April 1759. Died in office in 1782.
1782	1801	Anthony Coyle	Appointment as coadjutor bishop confirmed on 27 April 1777 and papal brief issued on 16 May 1777. Consecrated on 14 September 1777. Succeeded diocesan bishop in 1782. Died in office on 21 January 1801.
1796	1800	(James Dillon, coadjutor bishop)	Appointment as coadjutor bishop approved on 29 November 1795 and papal brief issued on 19 January 1796. Before succeeding, translated to Kilmore on 10 August 1800.
1801	1801	(John McElvoy, coadjutor bishop)	Appointment as coadjutor bishop approved on 18 January 1801 and papal brief issued on 30 January 1801. Did not succeed and died unconsecrated on 20 September 1801.
1802	1819	Peter MacLaughlin	Appointment confirmed on 25 April 1802 and papal brief issued on 14 May 1802. Consecrated on 24 August 1802. Additionally appointed Apostolic Administrator of Derry by papal brief on 12 January 1819. Resigned as Bishop of Raphoe on 29 July 1819. Subsequently, became Bishop of Derry on 4 April 1824.
1820	1861	Patrick McGettigan	Appointment approved on 25 June 1802 and papal brief issued on 11 July 1820. Consecrated on 17 September 1820. Died in office on 1 May 1861.
1861	1870	Daniel McGettigan	Appointment as coadjutor bishop approved on 3 February 1856 and papal brief issued on 29 February 1856. Consecrated on 18 May 1856. Succeeded diocesan bishop on 1 May 1861. Translated to Armagh on 7 March 1870.
1871	1879	James McDevitt	Appointment approved on 12 February 1871 and papal brief issued on 24 February 1871. Consecrated on 30 April 1871. Died in office on 5 January 1879.
1879	1887	Michael Logue	Appointed by papal brief on 13 May 1879 and consecrated on 20 July 1879. Translated to Armagh as coadjutor archbishop on 19 or 30 April 1887 and succeeded as Archbishop of Armagh on 3 December 1887.
1888	1922	Patrick Joseph O'Donnell	Appointed by papal brief on 26 February 1888 and consecrated on 3 April 1888. Translated to Armagh as coadjutor archbishop on 14 February 1922 and succeeded as Archbishop of Armagh on 19 November 1924.
1923	1963	William MacNeely	Appointed on 21 April 1923 and consecrated on 22 July 1923. Died in office on 11 December 1963.
1965	1982	Anthony McFeely	Appointed on 14 May 1965 and consecrated on 27 June 1965. Resigned 16 February 1982.
1982	1994	Séamus Hegarty	Appointed on 16 February 1982 and consecrated on 28 March 1982. Translated to Derry on 1 October 1994.
1995	2017	Philip Boyce, OCD	Appointed on 29 June 1995 and consecrated on 1 October 1995. Retired on 9 June 2017.
2017	2024	Alan McGuckian, SJ	Appointed on 9 June 2017 and consecrated on 6 August 2017.
2026		Niall Coll, KC*HS	Appointed on 13 November 2025 and consecrated on 25 January 2026.
