= Cathedral of St Eunan and St Columba =

St Eunan's Cathedral
- Cathedral of St Eunan and St Columba
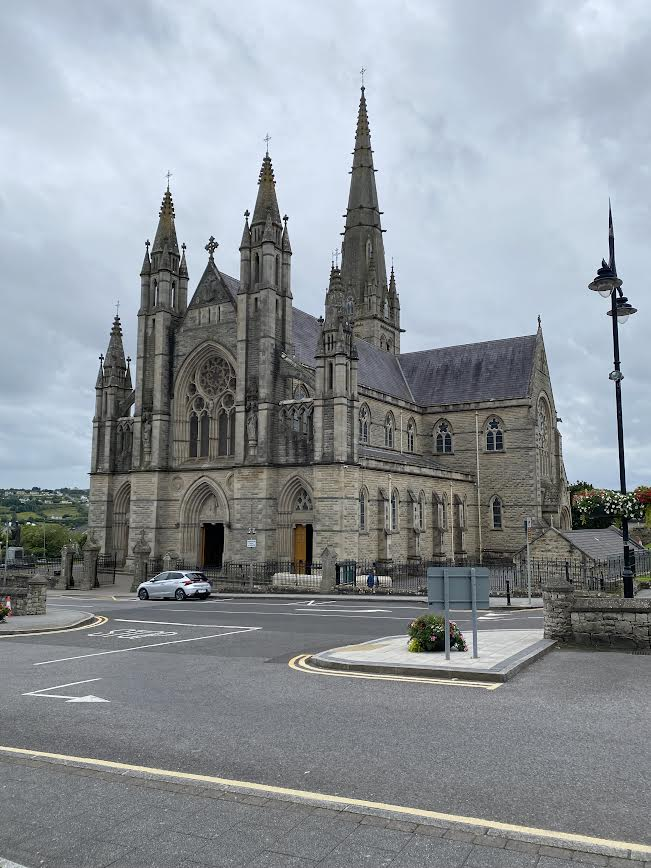

- Location in Ireland
- 54°57′01″N 7°44′24″W
- Location: Ard Choluim, Letterkenny, County Donegal
- Country: Ireland
- Denomination: Catholic
- Website: www.steunanscathedral.ie

History
- Status: Cathedral
- Founder: Cardinal Patrick O'Donnell
- Dedication: Adomnán and Columba
- Consecrated: 16 June 1901
- Events: 1985: Interior renovation 1988:Opening of Adoration Chapel; 2001: Exterior cleaning of sandstone 2001: Centenary

Architecture
- Functional status: Active
- Architect(s): William Hague; T. F. McNamara
- Architectural type: Cathedral
- Style: Gothic Revival
- Years built: 1890–1900
- Groundbreaking: 1888
- Completed: 1900

Specifications
- Materials: White sandstone

Administration
- Province: Armagh
- Diocese: Raphoe
- Parish: Conwal and Leck

Clergy
- Bishop: Niall Coll

St Eunan's Cathedral (/ˈjuːnən/ YOO-nən), or the Cathedral of St Eunan and St Columba as it is also known, is a cathedral in the parish of Conwal and Leck, part of the Diocese of Raphoe. Built between the years of 1890 and 1900, the cathedral is found in Letterkenny, County Donegal in Ireland. There are two cathedrals in the county; an older cathedral of the same name is found in the town of Raphoe, and since the Reformation, has been used by the Church of Ireland.

The cathedral was commissioned by Cardinal O'Donnell - then Bishop of Raphoe - and who, in 1888 aged 32, became the youngest bishop in the world at that time. The cathedral, located on Castle Street opposite Conwal Parish Church in the town, has a spire height of 73m/240ft and celebrated its centenary in 2001.

== Description ==
Cathedral altar c.1900

The cathedral is named for the Saints Adamnán and Columba; it opened on 16 June 1901 and is built in Victorian neo-Gothic style on a site overlooking the town. It was designed by William Hague, the well known Dublin architect and protégé of Pugin, and following Hague's death by his partner T. F. McNamara and was built at the cost of £300,000(around £50 million in today's money), making it the most expensive church in Ireland. St Eunan's Cathedral has a spire with a height of 240 feet. White sandstone from Mountcharles was used in the construction. It was shipped along the coast and up the Swilly. Townspeople carried bucketloads of the sandstone to the construction site piece by piece. The cathedral is furnished in oak, with a marble pulpit by Pearse Brothers of Dublin. The pulpit depicts statues of the Four Masters and the Four Evangelists.

The stained glass windows that illuminate the sanctuary and the Lady Chapel are by the Mayer firm of Munich. They depict thirteen scenes from the life of Jesus.

The ceilings are the work of Amici of Rome. The Great Arch illustrates the lives of St Eunan (better known as Adomnán or, locally, Adhamhnáin) and St Columba. The sanctuary lamp is made of solid silver and weighs over 1500 ounces. Willie Pearse, who took part in the Easter Rising, created some of the sculptures found within.

There are 12 bells in the Cathedral bell chamber. They carry the names of the saints of Tír Conail - Dallan, Conal and Fiacre, Adomnán, Baithen and Barron, Nelis and Mura, Fionán and Davog, Cartha and Caitríona, Taobhóg, Cróna and Ríanach, Ernan and Asica and Columba. The 12th bell weighs over 2 tons 5 cwts. After the cathedral was opened the organist played "O'Donnell Abu", "St Patrick's Day", "The Last Rose of Summer", "The Wearing of the Green" and "The Bells of Shandon".

In 1985, the cathedral was renovated and remodelled to better conform to the liturgical requirements of the Second Vatican Council. Care was taken to preserve the style and materials of the original altar in the new altar table and chair. The original altar-piece, an Irish carving of Leonardo's The Last Supper, is still present in the cathedral and has been incorporated into the new altar.

The sandstone exterior of the cathedral was cleaned in July 2001. The stone was then repaired and pointed with a special mortar of lime and sand. Krystol Hydrostop was finally applied to the exterior.

During the COVID-19 pandemic, Monsignor Gillespie, with Bishop of Raphoe Alan McGuckian, agreed to celebrate weekday morning Mass for the nation on RTÉ Television.

In late August and during September 2025 the cathedral underwent redecoration, with the cathedral closing during the week, to allow for the redecoration work to be completed. The newly redecorated cathedral was unveiled in October 2025.

== Clergy ==
In January 2026, the cathedral welcomed their new Bishop, Niall Coll, who was installed as Bishop of Raphoe on Sunday 25th August 2025 in the cathedral and became Parish Priest of the cathedral. The Cathedral Administrator is Monsignor Kevin Gillespie, and there are two assisting curates, Father Kizito Kalameera and Father Hartnett.

== Adoration Chapel ==
The Blessed Sacrament Chapel of Adoration or the Adoration Chapel (as it is more commonly known) is found on the grounds of the adjacent Loreto Convent. Bishop of Raphoe Séamus Hegarty officially opened it on 4 December 1988. This single-room chapel is a reconstructed building based on the site of an old school set up by the Loreto Sisters. It is not definitively known when the original building was constructed; however, during reconstruction work in 1988, a slate bearing a mason's mark from the year 1850 was discovered. Barry Feely from County Roscommon designed the chapel's granite altar; this is situated in front of a stained glass window which displays the "Virgin of the Sign" icon.

The Adoration Chapel is open from 1 pm on a Sunday afternoon until 8.30 pm Friday evening. The chapel is located in the grounds of the Loreto Convent and College, which is located adjacent to the cathedral.

Devotions are held in the cathedral on the Sundays of May and October at 7.00pm.

== Eponyms ==
The surrounding Cathedral Quarter (Irish: Ceathrú na hArdeaglaise), the adjacent Cathedral Square (Irish: Cearnóg na hArdeaglaise) and Cathedral Road (Irish: Bóthar na hArdeaglaise) are named after the building.

Letterkenny itself is often referred to as "The Cathedral Town".

== Gallery ==
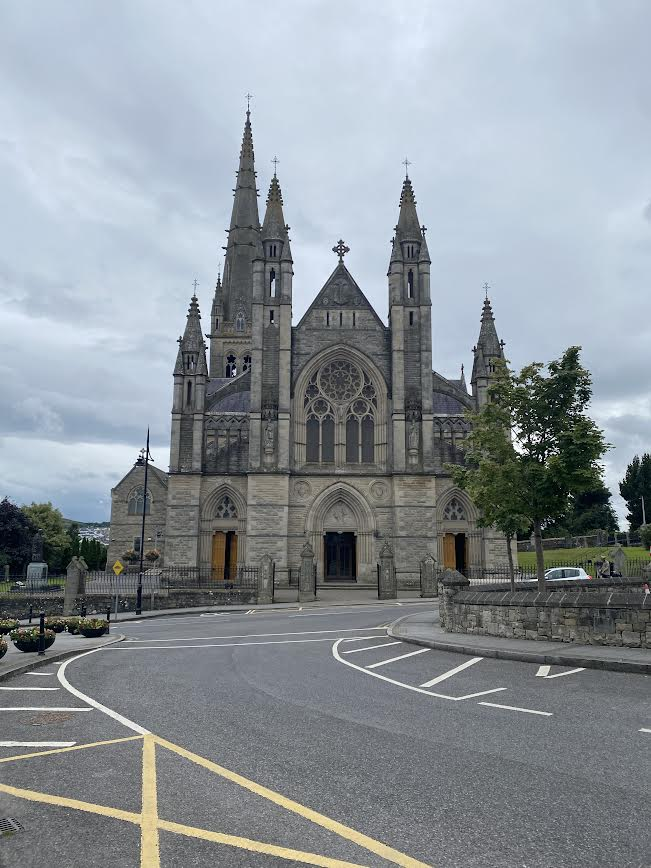
The Facade

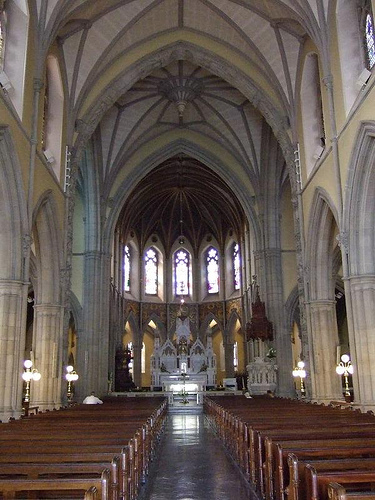
Central aisle within the Cathedral

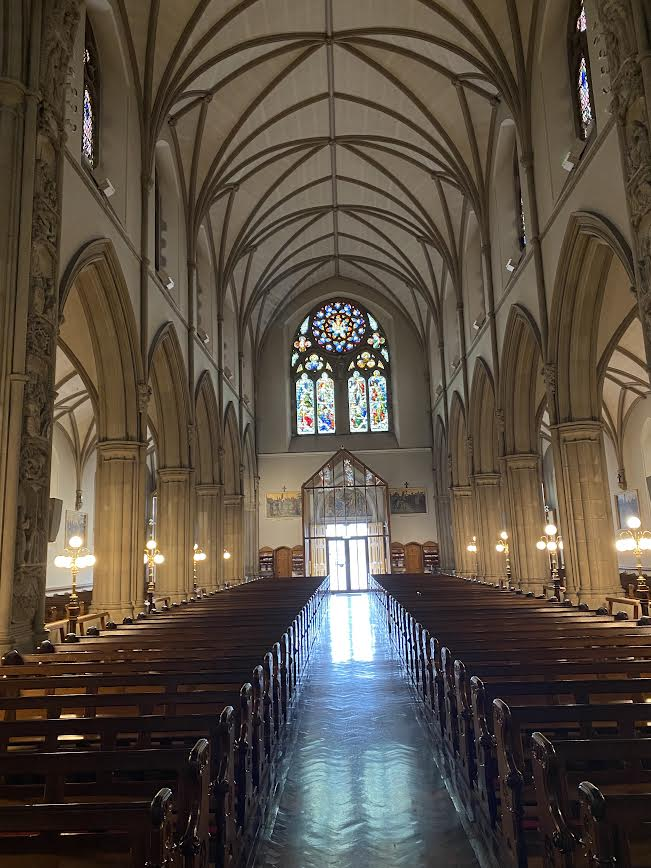
The interior facing the entrance

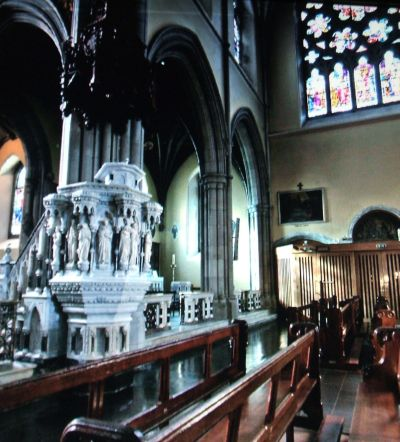
Cathedral pulpit

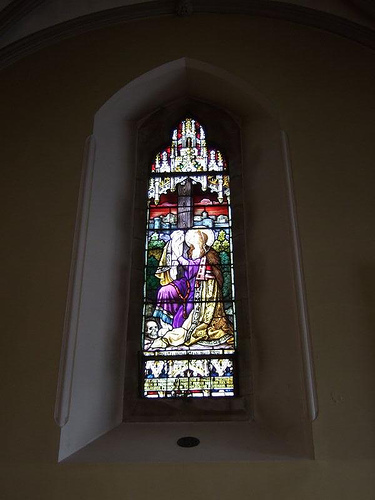
Stained glass window within the Cathedral

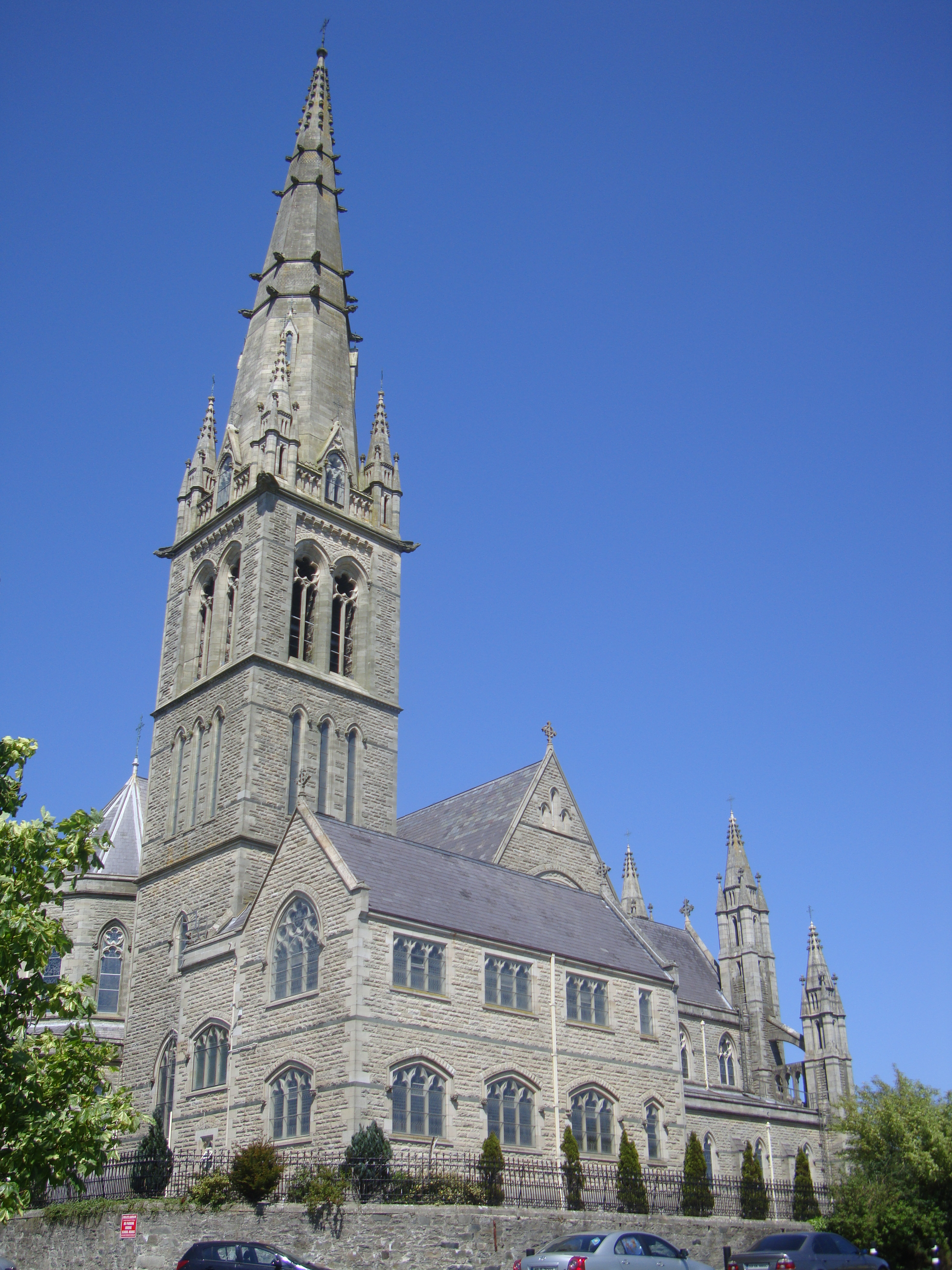
The tower on the backside.

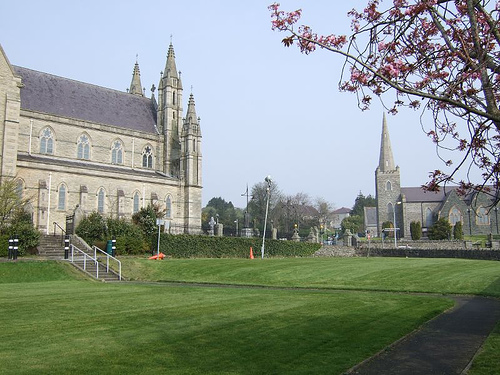
St. Eunan's Cathedral Grounds

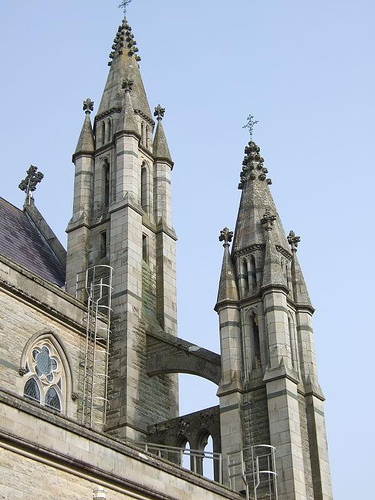
Flying Buttress

Carving on cathedral wall

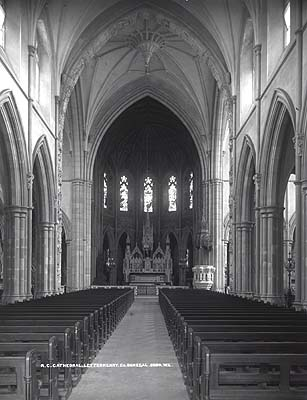
Interior circa 1900

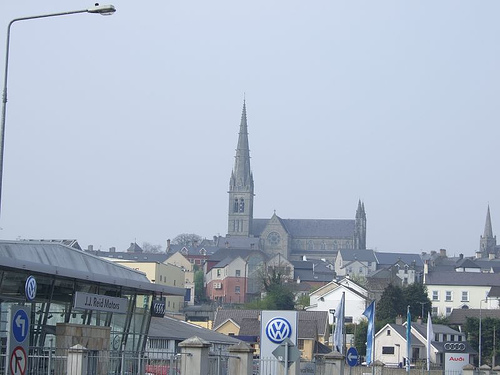
The cathedral dominating the skyline of Letterkenny.

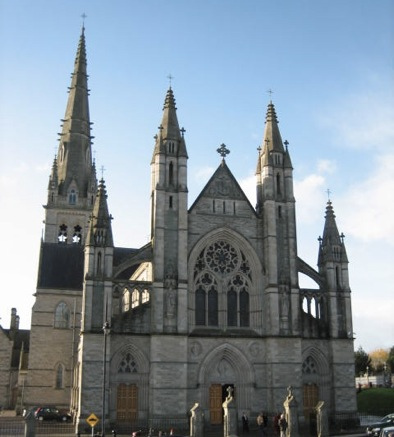
The main entrance

== See also ==
- Michael Healy (artist)
- Ethel Rhind
