= Conwal and Leck =

Parish in County Donegal, Ireland

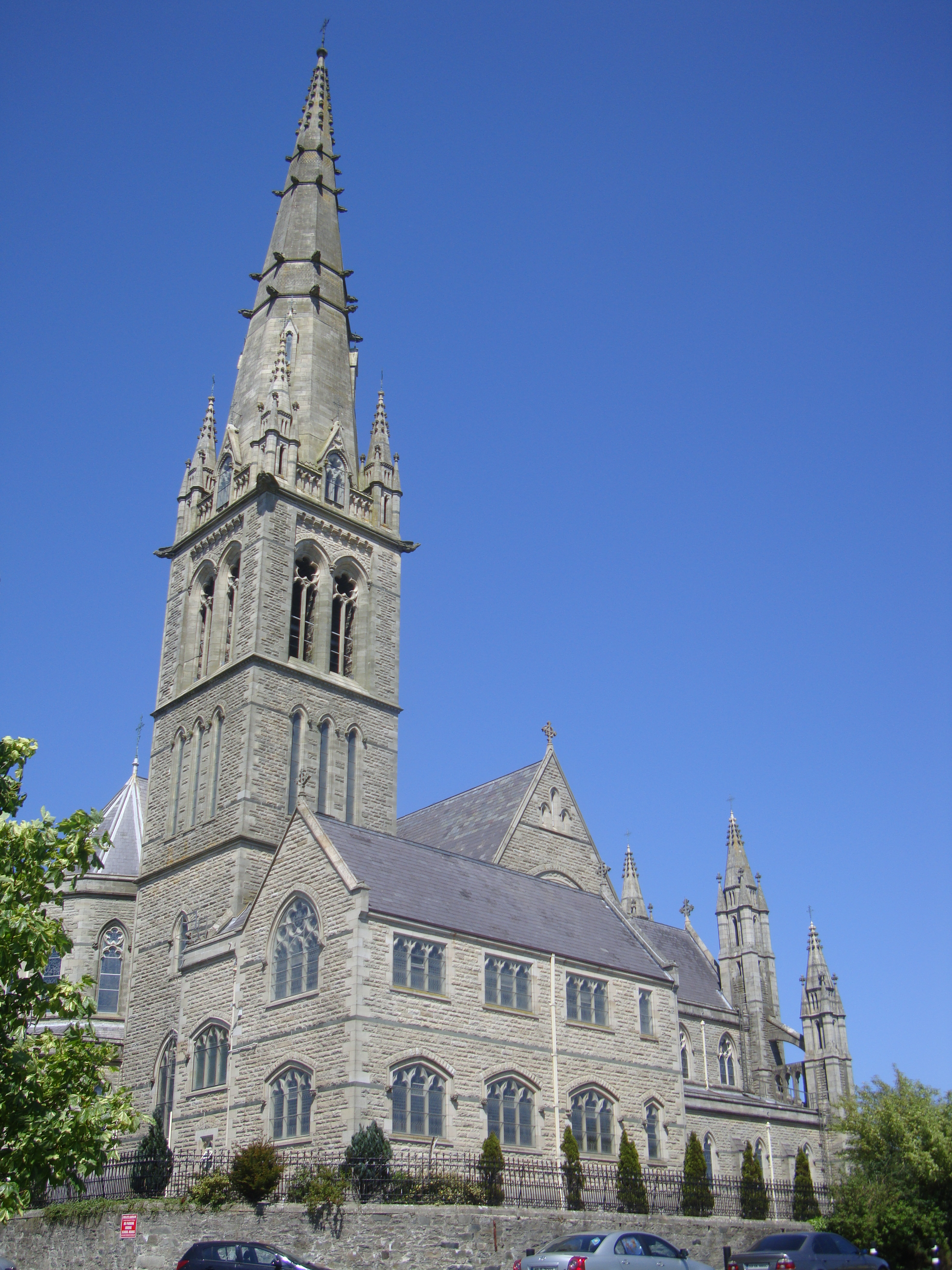
St Eunan's Cathedral

Conwal and Leck (Irish: Conbháil agus Leac) is a parish located in north-east County Donegal, Province of Ulster, Ireland. It covers west Letterkenny and the surrounding hinterland. The parish has approximately 10,000 inhabitants and 1,000 families.

Early records of ecclesiastical settlement at Conwal are dated in the Annals of Ulster around 914 AD. New Zealand politician John Chilton Lambton Carter was born in Conwal.

== Places of worship ==
New Leck Cemetery

The Cathedral of St Eunan and St Columba, the only Catholic cathedral in the county, is located in the parish. The parish priests are The Very Reverend Eamonn Kelly; Monsignor Kevin Gillespie and The Reverend Philip Kemmy, CC. Conwal Parish Church is the Anglican church in the parish and Trinity Hall is the Presbyterian church in the parish.

== Burial grounds ==
Conwal Cemetery

There are two cemeteries in the parish. Conwal Cemetery dates from 1795 and is located on the Letterkenny to Churchill road. New Leck cemetery, located in the Oldtown area, dates from 1978 and is a relatively modern cemetery. Old Leck cemetery is located not too far away and contains a ruined church and has been in existence since 1797.

Godfrey O'Donnell, who is buried in old Conwal Cemetery, died as a result of wounds inflicted in battle around 1256.

== See also ==
- List of towns in the Republic of Ireland
