= Séamus Hegarty =

Irish Catholic prelate (1940–2019)

The Most Reverend Dr Séamus Hegarty, D.D.
- Bishop Emeritus of Derry
- Diocese: Derry
- Appointed: 1 October 1994
- Installed: 6 November 1994
- Term ended: 23 November 2011
- Predecessor: Edward Daly
- Successor: Donal McKeown
- Previous post: Bishop of Raphoe

Orders
- Ordination: 19 June 1966 by John Charles McQuaid
- Consecration: 28 March 1982 by Tomás Ó Fiaich

Personal details
- Born: 26 January 1940 Kilcar, County Donegal, Ireland
- Died: 20 September 2019 (aged 79) Letterkenny, County Donegal, Ireland
- Denomination: Roman Catholic

Séamus Hegarty, D.D. (26 January 1940 – 20 September 2019) was an Irish Catholic prelate. He served as Bishop of Raphoe from 1982 to 1994, then as Bishop of Derry from 1994 to 2011.

== Early life and ministry ==
Hegarty was born in Kilcar, County Donegal, Ireland, in 1940. He had one brother, Dermot, and one sister, Maire. He received his education in Kilcar National School, St Eunan's College, Letterkenny, and St Patrick's College, Maynooth, which he attended from 1959 to 1966.

He graduated in Celtic studies and spoke fluent Irish, English and German. He was ordained to the priesthood by Archbishop McQuaid of Dublin at St. Patrick's College, Maynooth, on 19 June 1966. He taught in Colaiste na Croise Naofa, Falcarragh, where he later became president (1971–1981).

He carried through the establishment of Pobalscoil Chloich Cheannfhaola in 1973, becoming its first principal, and with his staff he made it a successful school. His last appointment before elevation to the Episcopate was as a curate in Stranorlar.

== Episcopal ministry ==
He was appointed the Bishop of the Diocese of Raphoe by the Holy See on 12 February 1982. His episcopal consecration took place at St Eunan's Cathedral in Letterkenny on 28 March 1982, the principal consecrator was Cardinal Tomás Ó Fiaich, and the principal co-consecrators were Gaetano Alibrandi, titular archbishop of Binda, and Edward Daly, Bishop of Derry. A brusque man with an abrupt air about him and small of stature, he was described by one Maynooth College professor as a "cross between Mussolini and the Child of Prague."

Following the resignation of Bishop Edward Daly on 26 October 1993, Dr Hegarty was appointed the Bishop of the Diocese of Derry by the Holy See on 1 October 1994 and installed at St Eugene's Cathedral, Derry on 6 November 1994.

In November 2009, Bishop Hegarty expressed concern after 17 priests in the Derry diocese were found to have child sexual abuse allegations filed against them.

In 2010 the Belfast Telegraph and other media outlets reported that Bishop Hegarty was a named defendant in a civil legal action concerning the alleged abuse of a young girl by a priest of the Derry diocese. Bishop Hegarty made a statement to the press asserting that no diocesan funds had been used to compensate the victim.

Hegarty's handling of similar abuse allegations in the Diocese of Raphoe and the extent of the Sexual abuse in Raphoe diocese reflected poorly on Hegarty's oversight.

=== Retirement ===
On 7 November 2011, he issued a statement saying that, having been diagnosed with "a condition which is, unfortunately, irreversible and progressive", he had submitted his resignation because he was no longer able to fulfill his role as diocesan bishop. The Holy See announced on 23 November 2011 that his resignation had been accepted.

He was succeeded by Donal McKeown in 2014 and Bishop Hegarty died on 20 September 2019.

== See also ==
- Sexual abuse scandal in Raphoe diocese

Catholic Church titles
Preceded by Anthony McFeely	Bishop of Raphoe; 1982–1994	Succeeded by Philip Boyce
Preceded by Edward Daly	Bishop of Derry; 1994–2011	Succeeded by Donal McKeown
