= National Board for Safeguarding Children in the Catholic Church =

The National Board for Safeguarding Children in Ireland (NBSCCCI or NBSCCC) established in 2006 in order to develop policies that would foster the prevention of child abuse in the Catholic Church in Ireland. Its main goals are to offer advice on safeguarding best practice, to assist in the development of procedures and to monitor practices. Its members have a good deal of experience in dealing with the problem of sexual abuse. The board has been described as "the Catholic Church's abuse watchdog".

On 30 November 2011 the board issued six reports into the dioceses of Tuam, Kilmore, Ardagh and Clonmacnoise, Dromore and Derry.

The board is funded through its sponsoring bodies: the Conference of Irish Bishops; the Conference of Religious of Ireland (CORI) and the Irish Missionary Union (IMU).

The second tranche of reports on 5 September 2012 were published. They comprise four dioceses and three religious congregations. The dioceses included are Kildare and Leighlin, Limerick, Cork and Ross, and Clonfert. The religious congregations are the Congregation of the Holy Spirit (Spiritans), the Missionaries of the Sacred Heart (MSC), and the male Dominicans.

Further reports were issued between 2011 and 2017, reporting the history and known extent of child abuse in every diocese on the island of Ireland, with separate reviews into religious orders that ran schools and residential institutions. In one order alone, the Christian Brothers, 870 allegations were made against 325 members, 12 of whom were convicted. In the report for 2016-2017 a "significant increase" was noted in the number of new claims, with 135 new allegations, most of them historical, compared with 86 for the previous year. The board suggested that when a clerical abuse story is widely publicised, more victims often come forward.
